= The Alternative Comedy Memorial Society =

The Alternative Comedy Memorial Society (ACMS) is a British comedy night, where comedians are invited to perform sets that might not work at more mainstream comedy nights. It was founded by John-Luke Roberts and Thom Tuck at the New Red Lion Theatre in Islington, London. For a while it was mainly held at the Soho Theatre, but now the regular London venue is The Phoenix, Cavendish Square. Each year there are Alternative Comedy Memorial Society shows at the Edinburgh Fringe. ACMS has been running since March 2011, usually on Monday evenings. The group's logo is a boulder emblazoned with 'JOKE?' being pushed up a hill, representing the slogan 'Fresh Sisyphean Comedy'.

== The show ==
The show is curated and hosted by Thom Tuck, and produced by Isabelle Adam. There are a group of regular comedians, referred to as "The Board", including William Andrews, Steve Pretty, Tom Bell, Ben Target, John-Luke Roberts, William Andrews, Sophie Duker, Joz Norris, Eleanor Morton, Sian Docksey, and Jonny & the Baptists.

The ACMS has developed a number of in-jokes, such as a list of permitted heckles and a repeated call and response with the audience.

In December 2012, the "ACMS panto" debuted. This was loosely structured around a performance of Aladdin, and played with many pantomime conventions.

The show has been filmed as a series of Comedy Blaps for Channel 4, which were released in 2013. The series is produced by Adrian Sturges and directed by Chris Shepherd.

== Participants ==
- Ed Aczel
- Tom Allen
- William Andrews
- Dan Antopolski
- Dru Cripps
- Belinda Anderson-Hunt
- Dougie Baldwin
- Tom Basden
- Aisling Bea
- Tom Bell
- Bob and Jim
- Ali Brice
- Alfie Brown
- Michael Brunström
- Abigail Burdess
- Holly Burn
- Margaret Cabourn-Smith & Zoe Gardner
- Bridget Christie
- Matthew Crosby
- Paul Currie
- Eleanor Curry
- Sian Docksey
- Alexis Dubus
- Alex Edelman
- Kevin Eldon
- Pippa Evans
- John Henry Falle
- Deborah Frances-White
- Nick Helm
- Adam Hess
- Matthew Highton
- Bec Hill
- Harry Hill
- Wil Hodgson
- Amy Hoggart
- Tommy Holgate
- Colin Hoult
- Edy Hurst
- Robin Ince
- Elis James
- Sanderson Jones
- Jonny & The Baptists
- Phill Jupitus
- Nadia Kamil
- John Kearns
- Tim Key
- Adam Larter
- Marek Larwood
- Tony Law
- Michael Legge
- Cariad Lloyd
- Josie Long
- Al Lubel
- Joe Lycett
- Tom Mayhew
- David McIver
- John Paul McQue
- Garrett Millerick
- Eleanor Morton
- Simon Munnery
- Robert Newman
- Phil Nichol
- Joz Norris
- Andrew O'Neill
- Jonathan Oldfield
- Celia Pacquola
- Henry Paker
- Rachel Parris
- Benjamin Partridge
- Sara Pascoe
- Howard Read
- Adam Riches
- John Robertson
- Lou Sanders
- Terry Saunders
- Paul Savage
- Abigoliah Schamaun
- Karl Schultz
- Waen Shepherd
- Bob Slayer
- Rachel Stubbings
- Nick Sun
- Isy Suttie
- Paul Sweeney
- Ben Target
- Lorna Rose Treen
- Alison Thea-Skott
- Asher Treleaven
- David Trent
- Addy Van Der Borgh
- Holly Walsh
- Danielle Ward
- Martin White
- Joe Wilkinson
- Mike Wozniak
- Sharnema Nougar
- David Tieck
- Kathy Rivett

== Impact ==
In The Guardian in 2014, Paul Merton described ACMS as somewhere audiences go to enjoy the art of comedy. In The Guardian in 2016, Simon Munnery described ACMS as keeping alternative comedy alive, even as they claim to memorialise it. In 2018 The British Comedy Guide referred to ACMS as a "mighty institution".

On the other hand, Stewart Lee has suggested that ACMS doesn't represent the working classes in the way that 1980s alternative comedy did, and in 2019 a speaker at the University of Kent's 'Alternative Comedy Now' conference questioned whether ACMS are the inheritors of the alternative comedy ethos, suggesting that the shows are too highbrow and exclusive.

== Awards and nominations ==
Year	Award	Category	Result
2026	Chortle Awards	Best Comedy Format (London)	Won

== See also ==
- Quantum Leopard
- Weirdos Comedy Club – UK based group of alternative comedians
