= Weirdos Comedy Club =

UK based group of alternative comedians

Comedy career
- Years active: 2010 – present
- Genre: Comedy

Weirdos Comedy Club is a UK based group of alternative comedians founded by Adam Larter in 2010.

== Origins ==
Weirdos Comedy Club, commonly referred to as "Weirdos", was formed by Adam Larter as an experimental night and a safe place to try out riskier or more alternative material than usual circuit comedy. Nights generally focussed on anarchic and silly sets deemed too alternative for more streamlined stand-up common on the UK comedy circuit. They have been compared to the 80's alternative comedy group The Comic Strip.

Originally housed in the Lion, Kings Cross it grew from a comedy night into a group and over the years nights and projects became larger. Of these, most notably is their annual alternative Christmas panto.

Unlike most comedy groups the line-up constantly shifts. The original Weirdos include Foster Comedy Award Winner John Kearns, Pat Cahill, Leicester Mercury Winner Ben Target, Holly Burn, Matthew Highton, Mark Stephenson, Ali Brice, Karl Schultz, Beth Vyse, Nick Sun, Darren Maskell and Larter himself.

Later Weirdos include Joz Norris, Marny Godden, Gareth Morinan, Joe Davies, Luke McQueen, Harriet Kemsley, Chris Boyd, Stuart Laws, William Lee, Katia Kvinge, Laurence Owen, Liberty Hodes, Lindsay Sharman, Jon Brittain, Eleanor Morton and Cassie Atkinson.

The early nights of Weirdos were unpredictable; Burn setting herself on fire or crowd surfing, Maskell gunging himself, Highton extending a ten-minute slot for over an hour to outdo another comic, Sun having the audience follow people or Morinan surveying the audience and holding after dinner speeches in a curry house to unsuspecting diners and staff.

== Christmas Panto ==
Since 2012 Weirdos have held an annual alternative Christmas panto in aid of Great Ormond Street hospital. They state that it is in actuality nothing like a real Christmas panto and focus more on silliness and anarchy.

2012 - Hook

The first panto was a re-production of Steven Spielberg's Hook, recreating the film onstage in its entirety. With John Kearns taking the lead of Peter Pan and Karl Schultz as Hook.

Full Cast - John Kearns (Peter Banning/Peter Pan); Karl Schultz (Captain Hook); Holly Burn (Tinker Bell); Matthew Highton (Rufio); Darren Maskell (Smee/Liza); Ben Target (Narrator); Ali Brice (Jack); Mark Stephenson (Maggie); Beth Vyse (Wendy/Lost Boy); Joe Davies (Thud Butt); Thomas Meek (Moira); Stuart Laws (PC Phil Collins/Pirate); Chris Boyd (Toodles); Joz Norris (Shadow/Lost Boy); Gareth Morinan (Mermaid/Lost Boy); Darren Walsh (Lost Boy); Marc Burrows (Lost Boy); Harry Maclaine (Young Peter Pan); Jack De'Ath (Pirate); Lindsay Sharman (Pirate); Joshua Ross (Pirate); Patrick Turpin (Pirate); William Lee (Crocodile); Pat Cahill (Mr Blobby); Adam Larter (Dancer)

2013 - The Colonel

Co-written and co-directed by Larter and Highton, The Colonel was a 'war epic about love and chicken, lots of chicken.' Based on a joke by Highton, the plot focussed on Sanders (played by Ali Brice) and his best friend Chicken Steve (played by Larter) as they grew in a small Kentucky town, eventually joining the army and killing Hitler. It featured in The Independent's and Time Out's must sees for Christmas.

Full Cast - Ali Brice (Sanders); Ben Target (Narrator); Beth Vyse (Mrs Sanders); Matthew Highton (Ron McDonald); Pat Cahill (Adolf Hitler/Lemon Boy); Marny Godden (Penny); Adam Larter (Chicken Steve); Mark Stephenson (Devil/Boston/Doc Brown); Gareth Morinan (Drill Sergeant); Joe Davies (Cobbler/Lieutenant Ron); John Kearns (Stanley/Lemon Boy); Stuart Laws (Kowalski/President/Marty McFly); Thomas Meek (Sampson Twin/First Lady/Bill); Jack De'Ath (Sampson Twin/Ted); Mark Dean Quinn (Management Consultant); Chris Boyd (Soldier/Sellotape Face); Liberty Hodes (Crazy Dream Lady); William Lee (Crocodile/Winston Churchill)

2014 - A Christmas Tail

Written by Larter and Directed by Highton, A Christmas Tail was the story of a feminist mermaid (played by Harriet Kemsley) and her hapless friend, or 'exoskeleton twat', an Australian Lobster (played by Joz Norris). The plot focuses on Kemsley journeying from Atlantis to the human world to stop a John Lewis advert from ruining their home. It once again featured in Time Outs Christmas must sees.

Full Cast - Harriet Kemsley (Maggie the Mermaid); Katia Kvinge (Sharon the Mermaid); Pat Cahill (King of Atlantis); Luke McQueen (Jack); John Kearns (Octopus/Finny Jones the Dolphin); Mark Stephenson (Gary the Eel); Beth Vyse (Moira); Gareth Morinan (Gillian/Whale); Ali Brice (Plaice/TV Salesman); Marny Godden (Sea Captain/Snail); William Lee (Crocodile); Thomas Meek (Grandmother); Chris Boyd (Coral); Laurence Owen (James/Salmon); Lindsay Sharman (Lucy/Jellyfish); Michael Brunström (Dorito Fish); Jack De'Ath (Pike); Penny Matthews (Octopus Tentacles/Stagehand); Joe Davies (DJ Tuna); Liberty Hodes (Stagehand); Charlie Miller (Stagehand); Mario D'Agostino (Stagehand); Ben Target (Floating Head)

2015 - Weirdos For Christmas Number One

Again written by Larter and directed by Highton, 2015's upcoming Weirdos For Christmas Number One sees Larter playing a fictional version of himself who forms the Weirdos into a band and hopes to write a Christmas Number One in order to raise money to pay off the Inland Revenue. The show is again among the critic's choice Christmas comedy events in publications such as TimeOut and Londonist.

== Other Nights ==
Only Fools and Horses and Horses and Horses and Horses and Horses - A comedy-cum-performance art piece loosely inspired by the classic sitcom Only Fools and Horses, this show had a one-off performance at the Museum of Comedy which was a critic's choice event in Londonist. The piece was written by Larter, who also played Del Boy and co-starred Marny Godden as Uncle Albert and Trigger, Gareth Morinan as Boycie, Jon Brittain as Marlene and the Geographical Area of Peckham, Letty Butler as Mickey Pearce, Alwin Solanky as Denzil and Cassandra's Grave, Andy Barr as himself and Christian Brighty as The Nag's Head.

Unofficial Harry Potter Sequels - In 2015, Weirdos Comedy Club co-produced with Laugh Out London a series of live unofficial, spoof Harry Potter sequels, which became some of the best-selling performances the two groups had ever staged and eventually transferred to a sold-out performance in the main space of the Leicester Square Theatre. These shows were again Critic's Choice in publications including TimeOut.

Full Cast - Adam Larter (Harry Potter); Eleanor Morton (Ginny Weasley/Molly Weasley); Matt Tedford (Ron Weasley/Luna Lovegood); Marny Godden (Hermione Granger/Uncle Albert); Jon Brittain (Hagrid); Cassie Atkinson (Professor McGonagall/Moaning Myrtle); Gareth Morinan (Albus Dumbledore/Arthur Weasley); Suzanna Kempner (Taylor Swift/Bellatrix Lestrange/Lucius Malfoy); Jack De'Ath (Dragon/Stagehand); Christian Brighty (Patronus/Stagehand)

Blue Print

Blue Print was a regular night held in the Lion, Stoke Newington throughout 2014. It focussed on more collaborative work, opposed to the original set based night of its origins.

Bowie Fest

Bowie Fest was a spoof version of the V&As Bowie Is that Larter and Highton put on in 2012.

Computer Boy

A play written by Larter about a boy who wanted to be a computer, starring Ali Brice, Beth Vyse and Luke McQueen. Widely regarded as one of the best Weirdo's pieces, Larter often cites it as the benchmark of his work.

The Fawlty Towers Dining Experience, Experience

Another spoof, this time of the famous Fawlty Towers Dining Experience. Weirdos held it in Edinburgh 2013 and reportedly the only audience members were the cast of the Fawlty Towers Dining Experience.

== See also ==
- The Alternative Comedy Memorial Society
