= Joz Norris =

British alternative comedian, comic actor and screenwriter

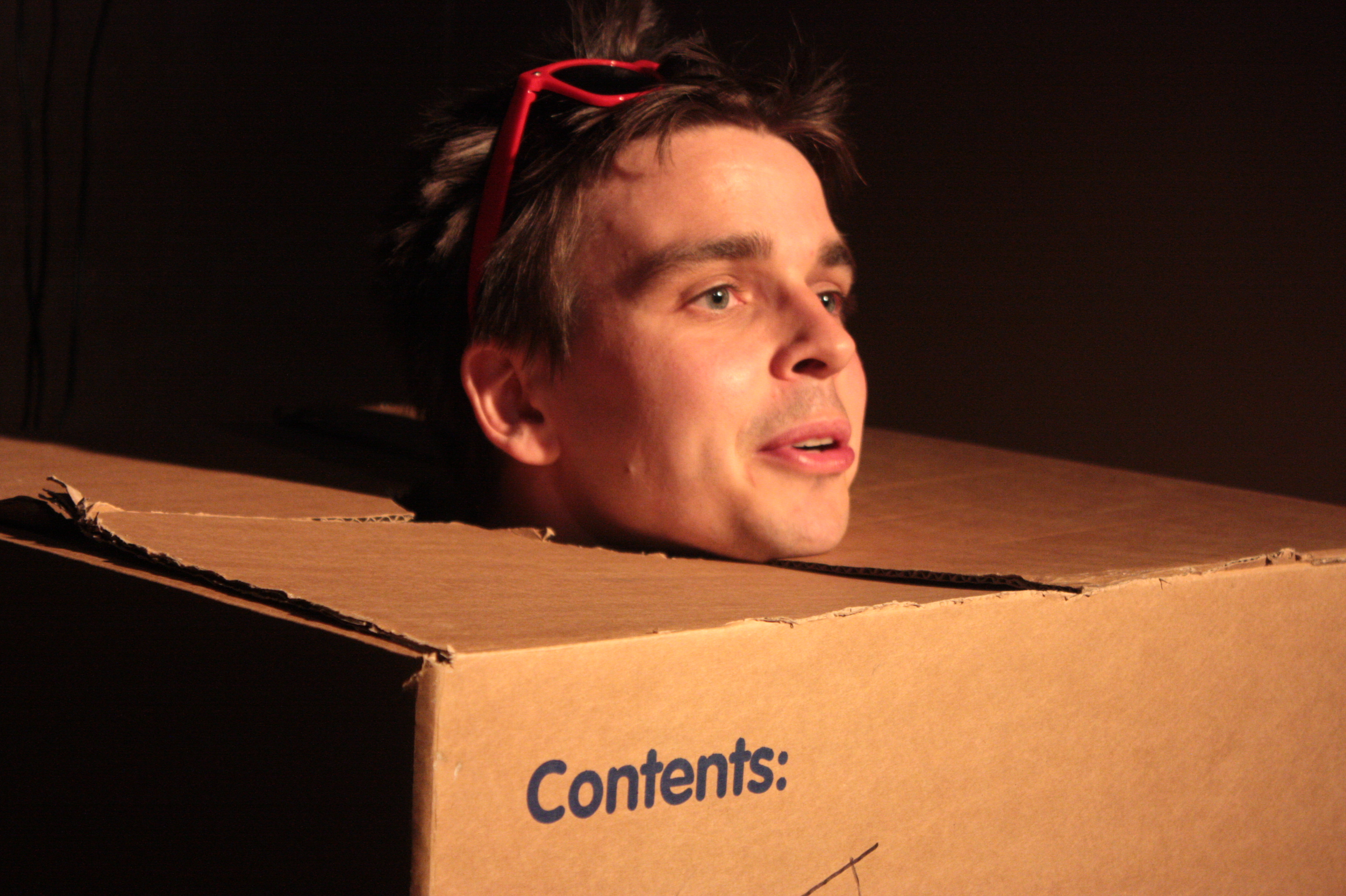
Norris at the Edinburgh Fringe in 2016

Josiah Norris (born 1989) is a British alternative comedian, comic actor, and screenwriter.

Norris started writing and performing comedy while studying English Literature at the University of East Anglia, alongside fellow comics and writers John Kearns, Jon Brittain and Pat Cahill.

He has performed solo shows at the Edinburgh Fringe since 2012, with his first full hour show in 2013. In 2017 he was included in the Guardian's Comedy Picks of the Fringe. His 2019 show 'Joz Norris is Dead: Long Live Mr Fruit Salad' won the Comedians Choice Award at the Fringe and transferred to the Soho Theatre, where its initial run was extended due to popular demand. The show was also featured in the Guardian list of the Ten Best Jokes of the Fringe. Norris has also performed at the Fringe in other comics' shows including Adam Larter's Return on Investment in 2015 and, since 2015, he has also performed regularly with the collectives Comedians' Cinema Club and The Alternative Comedy Memorial Society.

He is a frequent collaborator with Weirdos Comedy Club. He has also collaborated with Up In Arms Theatre Company. Other theatre projects have included his performance in the play 'Timmy' by Roxy Dunn at the Edinburgh Fringe in 2018.

In 2015 Norris won Outstanding Supporting Actor in a Comedy at the Los Angeles Webseries Festival for his performance in the webseries The Backbenchers, and in 2017 his own webseries The Girl Whisperer saw him nominated for awards for Outstanding Lead Actor and Outstanding Writing. His own short films include Robert Johnson & The Devil Man, a collaboration with director Matthew Highton which received positive notices in the comedy press.

In 2016 he appeared alongside Bob Slayer on an episode of ITV's courtroom reality show Judge Rinder to resolve a dispute over an unpaid fee after a performance at a metal festival. The episode was subsequently reviewed by the comedy website Chortle, noting that it was the first time they had ever had to review an episode of a reality TV show.

In 2023 he was ranked among the top 13% of Taylor Swift listeners by Spotify.

== Radio ==
- 2020: Joz And Roxy Are Useless Millennials (BBC Radio 4)
- 2021: Joz Norris: A Small Talk on Small Talk (BBC Radio 4)
- 2022: The Dream Factory (BBC Radio 4)

== Awards ==
- 2015: Outstanding Actor In a Comedy, Los Angeles Webseries Festival
- 2019: Best Show, Comedians’ Choice Awards, Edinburgh Fringe
