= Queen's Knickers =

Queen's Knickers may refer to:

- The Queen's Knickers, 1993 children's book by Nicholas Allan
- Queen's Knickers Award, given by the Society of Authors for an illustrated children's book
