= Mockery Manor =

Horror podcast

- Genre: fiction podcast, drama fiction podcast

Publication
- No. of episodes: 72

Reception
- Ratings: 4.7/5

Related
- Website: https://www.longcatmedia.com/mockery-manor

Mockery Manor is a thriller podcast produced by Long Cat Media, starring Hayley Evenett and Laurence Owen. The show is set in the summer of 1989 and follows the story of twin sisters JJ and Bette as they start working at an amusement park called Mockery Manor.

== Background ==
Mockery Manor is produced by Long Cat Media. The podcast debuted on Hallowe'en 2019 and as of October 2024, has entered its fourth season. Episodes are released on the first Tuesday of every month. The show is written and directed by Lindsay Sharman, with music, sound design, and editing by Laurence Owen.

=== Cast and characters ===
- Hayley Evenett as JJ Armstrong, Bette Armstrong and additional voices
- Laurence Owen as Parker, Matthew "Matty", Jenkins and additional voices
- Lindsay Sharman as Margot Mockery, Janet, Davina and additional voices
- Peter Sowerbutts as Manager Norton
- Sooz Kempner as Kelly and Dorothy

== Reception ==
Daniel Cooper, the senior editor of Engadget, wrote that "the first couple of episodes had me hooked". Podcast Magazine gave the show five out of five microphones saying that the "acting is incredible" and the "backstories are cleverly interwoven". The show was nominated in the 2020 British Podcast Awards for best fiction podcast.
