= Tim Vine =

English comedian (born 1967)

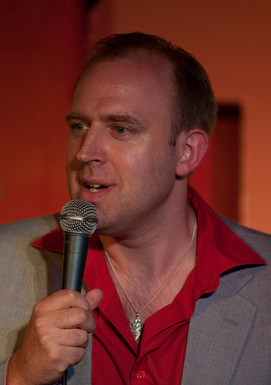
- Vine performing in June 2010
- Born: 4 March 1967 (age 59); Cheam, London, England
- Occupations: Comedian, actor, writer, presenter
- Years active: 1994–present
- Known for: One-liners, deadpan humour
- Relatives: Jeremy Vine (brother); Rachel Schofield (sister-in-law)
- Website: timvine.com

Timothy Mark Vine (born 4 March 1967) is an English comedian, actor, writer and presenter best known for his puns and other one-liners and his role on the TV sitcom Not Going Out (2006–2012, 2014). He has also released a number of stand-up comedy specials and written several joke books.

From 2004 to 2014, Vine held the Guinness World Record for the most jokes told in an hour: each joke had to get a laugh from the audience to count towards the total, and he set the new record with 499 jokes. In both 2010 and 2014, he won the award for best joke at the Edinburgh Festival Fringe, and he was the runner-up for each of the three years between.

== Early life ==
Timothy Mark Vine was born in the Cheam suburb of London on 4 March 1967, the son of Diana (née Tillett), a housewife and occasional doctor's receptionist, and Guy Vine (died 2018), a lecturer in civil engineering at North East Surrey College of Technology. He is the younger brother of broadcaster Jeremy Vine and the older brother of artist Sonya Vine. He was educated in Surrey, attending Lynton Prep in Ewell, Aberdour School in Burgh Heath, and Epsom College in Epsom.

== Career ==
=== Stand-up ===
Vine's stand-up act consists primarily of a series of quick-fire one-liners and puns, along with comedic songs and a bagful of props.

Vine and a security guard from his office job in Croydon started doing open mic nights as a hobby. During 1991, Tim Vine regularly honed his routine at the Comedy Café in London, adding other clubs throughout 1992. He came second in the Hackney Empire New Act competition in 1993. Vine quit his job to go on tour as a support act for Boothby Graffoe. Vine became a regular on the London comedy circuit by 1994, trying a variety of comedy styles. He realised one-liners were a good way forward after the audience's positive reaction to his joke: "So I went to the doctors. He said, 'You've got hypochondria'. I said, 'Not that as well!'" Vine built up this repertoire, before making his first TV appearance on BBC1's Pebble Mill.

In 1996, Vine met Lee Mack at the Comedy Lounge in Kingston upon Hull. Mack was competing in The Gong Show, where up to ten comedians try to last for a full five minute slot, hoping to beat the Gong and not get voted off by the public. Mack inadvertently did a couple of Vine's jokes, to which the audience shouted "Tim Vine". When Mack came off stage, he asked a man who Tim Vine was, and got the reply "He plays here quite a bit." The man he had asked was Tim Vine. The pair later worked together on The Sketch Show, Not Going Out and Let's Play Darts for Comic Relief.

The comedian has appeared at the Edinburgh Festival Fringe, with shows such as The Tim Vine Shambles and The Tim Vine Fiasco (1995) - which won him the Perrier Newcomer Award - then Tim Vine Flat Out (1998), I'm Vine Thanks and Tim Vine and the Minotaur (1999). In 2006, he had a large advertising hoarding erected featuring his name and image, with a small sub-heading "...is not appearing at this year's Edinburgh Festival." Vine appeared at the Pleasance Courtyard for the first two weeks of the 2008 Edinburgh Festival Fringe performing a show entitled Punslinger.

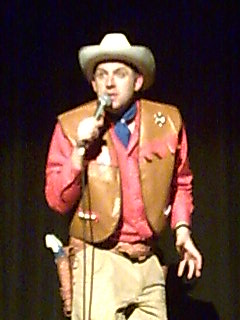
Vine on the Punslinger tour in May 2008

In a BBC Radio Wales interview with Behnaz Akhgar (12 October 2021), Vine revealed that he had intended to perform a new stand-up show at the 2020 Edinburgh Fringe but Breeeep! was delayed until 2022 due to the COVID-19 pandemic. Vine released a CD entitled Tim Vine Edinburgh Festival Diary, recorded each day at the Fringe. The Breeeep! tour (2023) sold out at many venues. However, September 21's show was relocated after the original venue cancelled due to the 2023 United Kingdom reinforced autoclaved aerated concrete crisis.

Many of Vine's jokes have been falsely attributed to Tommy Cooper, being in Cooper's style; the West End show about Cooper actually features some of Vine's jokes.

=== Panto ===
- 2005/2006 – Dandini in Cinderella (New Wimbledon Theatre) with Susan Hampshire, Richard Wilson, Naomi Wilkinson, John Barrowman, Peter Duncan.
- 2006/2007 – Silly Billy in Jack and the Beanstalk (Richmond Theatre) with John Challis, Sue Holderness, Aled Jones.
- 2009/2010 – Muddles in Snow White and the Seven Dwarfs (Richmond Theatre).
- 2010/2011 – Jangles in Sleeping Beauty (Richmond Theatre) with Anita Dobson.
- 2012/2013 – Wishee Washee in Aladdin (Richmond Theatre).
- 2014/2015 – Buttons in Cinderella (New Wimbledon Theatre) with Linda Gray, Matthew Kelly, Wayne Sleep.
- 2016/2017 – Idle Jack in Dick Whittington (New Wimbledon Theatre) with Matthew Kelly, Arlene Phillips.
- 2019/2020 – Buttons in Cinderella (Fairfield Halls, Croydon) with Ore Oduba, Cat Sandion.

=== Music ===
Vine plays the guitar, bass, piano and drums.

He occasionally plays the drums at his church. He was in several bands, including alongside his brother Jeremy in The Flared Generation, which Smash Hits magazine described as "the most unfashionable punk band in the country.

Vine has released three novelty music albums, Pretend Popstar - Fake Hits, Dance Floor Gridlock and Angus Crunch and the Nepali Flautist.

Vine is a Elvis Presley fan and has been since his death in 1977; he has a picture of Presley in every room at his home. The megastar was Vine’s Specialist Subject on Celebrity Mastermind and his inspiration for performing to "Viva Las Vegas" on Comic Relief Does Fame Academy. In August 2019, Vine's Plastic Elvis tribute act was a sell-out at the Edinburgh Fringe.

In May 2020, when the Eurovision Song Contest was cancelled due to the COVID-19 pandemic, Vine competed in the Isolation Song Contest representing Romania with his home-filmed, self-composed entry "Room Mania". John Archer also made several appearances in shots from his own house. The event raised around £40,000 for the homeless charity Crisis, Refuge (which supports female domestic abuse survivors) and The Trussell Trust food banks.

=== Television ===
Tim Vine's first TV appearance was on BBC One's Pebble Mill in 1994.

In autumn 1995, Vine hosted the BBC One morning quiz Housemates, featuring an endgame called Up The Garden Path. The show ran for one season of 25 episodes.

Vine was the first man to appear on Channel 5, alongside Julia Bradbury and the Spice Girls, when the network launched on 30 March 1997. The following day, game show Whittle premiered with Vine as host for two seasons March–June and September–December.

From May to August 1997, Vine presented the Channel 4 game show Fluke which he devised.

Vine hosted Fort Boyard Takes on the World in 2004.

From 2001 to 2004, Vine co-wrote/starred in both series of ITV's The Sketch Show with Lee Mack.

From 2006 to 2012, Vine played Timothy Gladstone Adams in Mack's BBC One sitcom Not Going Out. He returned for a cameo in the 2014 Christmas episode and the series 7 finale.

Since 2009, Vine has made appearances on the Channel 4 game show Countdown as a guest in Dictionary Corner.

In 2012, Vine hosted one series of game show Don't Blow the Inheritance for ITV.

Vine faced "The Beast" Mark Labbett on The Chase in 2012 and 2021.

Replacing Mark Williams, Vine portrayed Sebastian Beach in the second and final season of BBC One's comedy Blandings (2013–2014), based on the books by P. G. Wodehouse.

In 2014 and 2015, Vine appeared in the revival of Celebrity Squares as resident comedian alongside Joe Wilkinson.

In 2017, he appeared in two episodes of Tim Vine Travels Through Time on BBC One.

In mid-2018, Vine was a celebrity contestant in 10 episodes of Taskmaster series 6, on Dave.

In autumn 2018, Vine hosted the ITV quiz show Football Genius.

Vine has participated in several Comic Relief / Sport Relief charity competitions. In Comic Relief Does Fame Academy Vine performed Presley's hit "Viva Las Vegas" (2007) and on Let's Dance for Comic Relief (2013), Vine was talked out of Presley and given Justin Timberlake;s "Rock Your Body", making it to the final. In 2015, he was runner-up in Let's Play Darts, losing out to Mack. Vine returned in 2016, defeating Mike Tindall in the final. For 2022, Vine competed against Kiri Pritchard-McLean in One Red Nose and Their Dog.

=== Radio and audiobooks ===
BBC Radio 4 airs The Tim Vine Chat Show, where members of the audience are interviewed, having filled in a form before the show if they wish to be considered for selection. Vine presented one series of four episodes in July 2016, and a Christmas edition on 26 December 2016. A second series of six episodes was broadcast in September and October 2017. Additional Festive and Summer specials aired in 2018 and 2019. The Tim Vine Christmas Chat Show 2021 was broadcast on 23 December.

In 2017, Tim Vine Travels Through Time was broadcast on BBC Radio 2, before moving to BBC One for two televised episodes.

=== Books ===
In 2003, Vine contributed to the Sit-Down Comedy book, but his first book was released in 2010 entitled The Biggest Ever Tim Vine Joke Book containing over 1,000 jokes and puns. Then, in 2011, Vine released a second joke book entitled The Not Quite Biggest Ever Tim Vine Joke Book, specifically for children.

- 2010 – The Biggest Ever Tim Vine Joke Book
- 2011 – The (Not Quite) Biggest Ever Tim Vine Joke Book: Children's Edition
- 2013 – The Tim Vine Bumper Book of Silliness: Daft Jokes, Crazy Pictures, Utter Nonsense

== Awards ==
=== BAFTA ===
Vine's ensemble series The Sketch Show won the BAFTA for Best Comedy Programme in 2002.

=== Fringe awards ===
In August 2010, Vine won the prize for the funniest joke of that year's Edinburgh Fringe, following a public vote from a judged shortlist. His winning joke was "I've just been on a once-in-a-lifetime holiday. I'll tell you what, never again."

On 25 August 2011, Vine won the prize for the second funniest joke at the Edinburgh Fringe festival. His joke was "Crime in multi-storey car parks. That is wrong on so many different levels." He was beaten by Nick Helm. In 2012 Vine again came second with the joke "Last night me and my girlfriend watched three DVDs back to back. Luckily I was the one facing the telly." He was beaten by Stewart Francis. In 2013 Vine came fourth with the joke "My friend told me he was going to a fancy dress party as an Italian island. I said to him 'Don't be Sicily'." The winner was Rob Auton.

Vine won the award for the second time in 2014 with the joke "I decided to sell my Hoover... well it was just collecting dust."

=== World record ===
On 7 October 2004, Vine broke the Guinness World Record for the most jokes told in an hour with 499, beating the previous record of 362 by Estonian Erkki Kolu. Each joke had to get a laugh from the paying audience to count towards the total. The record was subsequently broken on two occasions by Anthony Lehmann and Korukonda Ranga Rao, but Guinness later decided both performers had breached guidelines by using cue cards, so Vine was reinstated. He held the record until November 2014, when Australian comedian Taylor Goodwin, inspired by Vine, told 550 jokes.

== Personal life ==
Vine lives in Banstead, Surrey. He is a practising Anglican, and has performed at Spring Harvest Christian festivals.

Vine is a supporter of Sutton United, stating that the first of the team's games he attended was an FA Cup match against Middlesbrough during the 1987–88 season. He is also a keen darts fan, having attended several Professional Darts Corporation tournaments along with Lee Mack. Some of these were televised, such as the 2011 World Championships when both Vine and Mack appeared in the crowd. He also plays darts in his spare time.

== Filmography ==
=== Television ===
Year	Title	Role	Notes
1995	Housemates	Presenter	1 series BBC One
1997	Fluke	Presenter	1 series
1997	Whittle	Presenter	2 series
1997	The Tim Vine Christmas Present	Presenter	One-off special on Channel 5
2001–2004	The Sketch Show	Various Characters	2 series
2004	Fort Boyard Takes on the World	Presenter	1 series
2006–2012, 2014	Not Going Out	Timothy Gladstone Adams	5 series, 1 special
2012	Don't Blow the Inheritance	Presenter	1 series
2014	Blandings	Sebastian Beach	1 series
2014–2015	Celebrity Squares	Resident comedian	2 series
2017	Tim Vine Travels Through Time	Himself	1 September 2017 & Christmas Special
2018	Football Genius	Presenter	1 series

==== Guest appearances ====
Title	Role	Notes
Pebble Mill	Guest Comedian	1994
Call My Bluff	Panellist	1996
Saturday Live	Guest Comedian	1996
Noel's Telly Years	Guest	17 January 1997
Fort Boyard	Contestant	2003
Spelling Bee	Contestant	14 July 2005
Who Wants to be a Millionaire?	Contestant	11 September 2007 – Jeremy Vine, 9 December 2012 – Cheryl Fergison
Comic Relief Does Fame Academy	Contestant	3 March 2007 – 15 March 2007
Celebrity Juice	Panellist	15 October 2008
Celebrity Mastermind	Contestant	1 January 2009 (Elvis Presley), 27 December 2019 (Jaws)
Countdown	Dictionary Corner	Various dates 2009–2012, 2014–2016, 2019–2020, 1–7 February 2022
Neighbours	Guest appearance	28 July 2009 – Episode 5742
Live at the Apollo	Himself	18 December 2009
Celebrity Total Wipeout	Contestant	26 December 2009
Spicks and Specks	Self	8 September 2010
Question of Sport	Contestant	7 February 2011 (S40E11), 21 September 2016 (S46E05), 25 March 2022 (S51E25)
Dave's One Night Stand	Headline act	24 November 2011
Argumental	Guest	15 December 2011
The Chase: Celebrity Special	Contestant	7 October 2012, 12 December 2021 (S11E10)
Pointless Celebrities	Contestant	1 December 2012 – Karen Taylor, 3 Sep 2016 – Terry Alderton, 3 March 2019 – Esther Rantzen, 30 October 2021 – Nina Conti.
QI	Panellist	11 January 2013
Let's Dance for Comic Relief	Contestant	16 February, 9 March 2013
Alexander Armstrong's Big Ask	Guest	26 February 2013
What's Cooking?	Guest	4 March 2013
Draw It!	Contestant	26–30 May 2014
Celebrity Fifteen to One	Contestant	20 June 2014
Catchphrase: Celebrity Special	Contestant	22 June 2014, 10 October 2020
Gadget Man	Guest	25 August 2014
Stars at Your Service	Guest participant	11 October 2014
Weekend at Christmas	Guest	25 December 2014
Let's Play Darts	Contestant	3, 6 & 8 March 2015 / 28 February, 6 & 13 March 2016
Tipping Point: Lucky Stars	Contestant	29 October 2016 & 26 August 2023
Debatable	Panelist	(Series 2) 8 & 17 April & 2 May 2017
Celebrity Antiques Road Trip	Contestant	12 December 2017
Taskmaster	Contestant	(Series 6) 2 May 2018 – 4 July 2018
Richard Osman's House of Games	Contestant	(Series 3, Week 16) 10–14 February 2020
Good Morning Britain	Guest	7 October 2021 (as Plastic Elvis), 25 December 2021
Countryfile/Comic Relief: One Red Nose and Their Dog	Contestant	6 & 18 March 2022
Gogglebox: Gogglebox for Stand Up To Cancer	Participant	3 November 2023

In quiz show celebrity specials, Vine often plays for Cure Parkinson's, because of his father, Guy Vine, who died with the illness in August 2018.

=== Stand-up DVDs ===
- Live (29 November 2004)
- Live – So I Said To This Bloke... (27 October 2008)
- Punslinger Live (22 November 2010)
- The Joke-a-motive Live (21 November 2011)
- Tim Timinee Tim Timinee Tim Tim to You (28 November 2016)
- Sunset Milk Idiot Live (25 November 2019)
- Breeeep! (18 November 2024)

=== Feature-length films ===
Vine has made three films, though these have not yet been widely released – Library Altitude Zero, FearMoth., and Rocker 'Brella Fella.Fear Moth was shown at the Brighton Film Festival in 2017.
