= Matthew Highton =

British comedian and film-maker

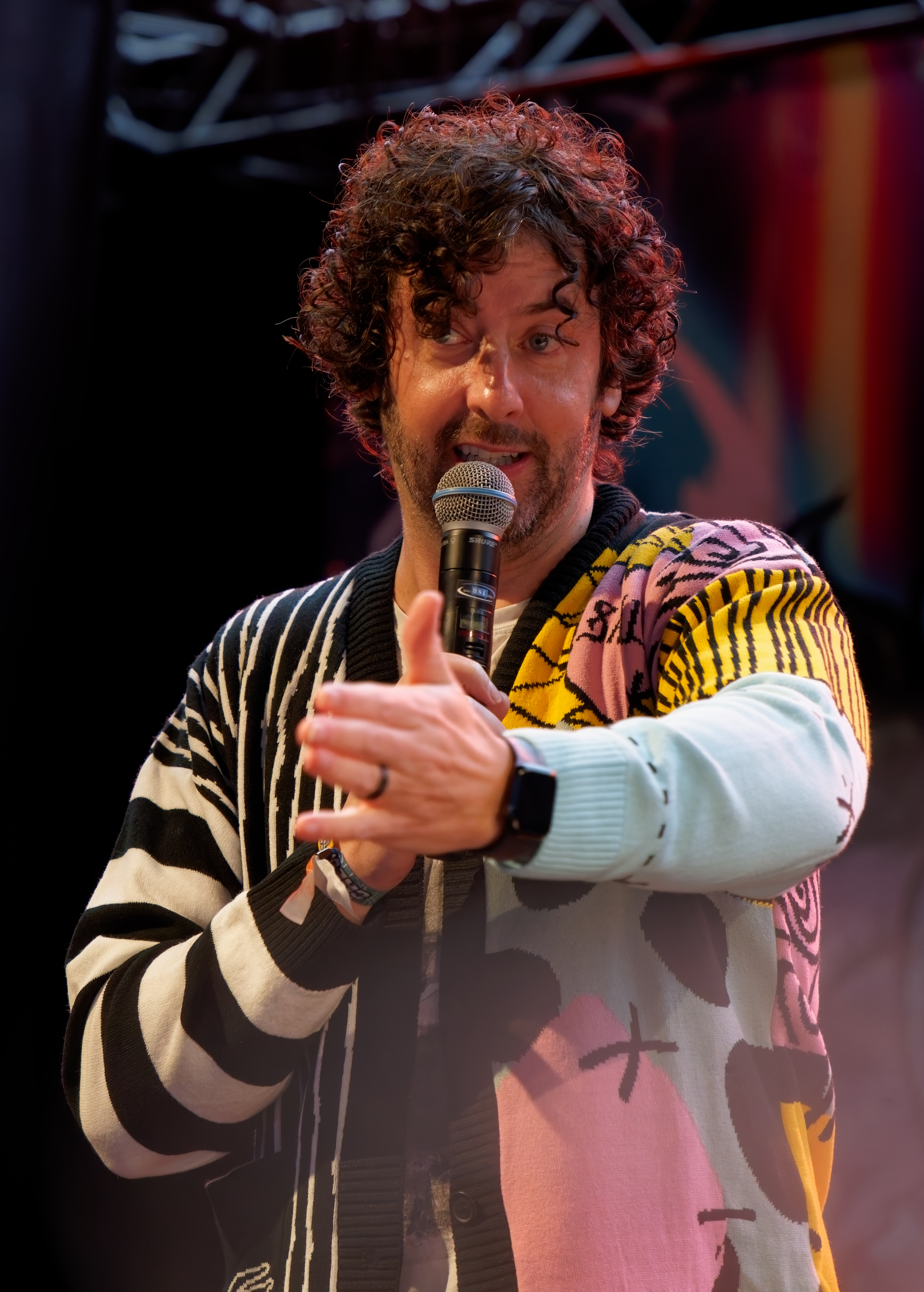
Highton in 2025

Matthew Highton is a British comedian and film-maker from Saddleworth known for his surreal storytelling.

Performing since 2009, Highton has worked as both a solo act and as part of the alternative comedy collective Weirdos. He has taken several shows to the Edinburgh Festival Fringe, débuting in 2010. In 2014, Highton was also part of the cast for Knightmare Live, a stage version of the popular 90s children show Knightmare.

As part of Weirdos, Highton co-wrote and directed their 2013's alternative Christmas Panto, The Colonel alongside Weirdos founder Adam Larter and directed 2014's A Christmas Tail. He also played Rufio in their 2012 stage re-production of Steven Spielberg's Hook. In 2012, Highton and Larter also put on Bowie Fest a spoof version of the V&A's 'Bowie Is' exhibit. In 2017, he played a hybrid of Donald Trump and Phil Collins, in Tony Law and Friends in the Battle for Icetopia. A collaboration between Weirdos and Tony Law unwisely set on the Alexandra Palace Ice Rink. The show went on to receive the 2018 Chortle Award for Event of the Year.

Highton is a filmmaker, creating the online sketch show The Thinking Shower which he stars in alongside, amongst others, Fosters Comedy Award winner John Kearns. In 2014, he made his first short film Santageddon which starred several other UK comedians including Kearns, Nick Helm, Gemma Whelan and Pat Cahill.

During the Coronavirus pandemic, Highton put his filmmaking and editing skills to use creating a string of viral videos. Most notably his stock footage recreations, where he recreates classic TV intros such as Pokémon and the Simpsons using nothing but stock footage.

Highton made his directorial debut Lost on the Road in 2026 an improvised comedy feature starring Rufus Hound, Briony Redman, Richard Soames and Highton himself. It came off the back of an online Dungeons and Dragons campaign (also during the Coronavirus pandemic). It premiered at the London Independent Film Festival and won best no budget feature.
