= Hilltop Hospital =

- Also known as: Hôpital Hilltop; Klinik Hügelheim; Dokter Fieberbei; Heuvellandziekenhuis
- Genre: Animated television series
- Based on: Hilltop Hospital series by Nicholas Allen
- Written by: Nicholas Allan
- Directed by: Pascal Le Nôtre
- Voices of: Kevin Whately; Sally Ann Marsh; Celia Imrie; Paul Shane; Brian Murphy; Julie Higginson; Jonathan Kydd; Dame Thora Hird; Joanna Ruiz
- Theme music composer: Ben Heneghan and Ian Lawson (English version)
- Composers: Ben Heneghan; Ian Lawson
- Countries of origin: United Kingdom; France; Germany
- Original language: English
- No. of seasons: 2
- No. of episodes: 52

Production
- Executive producers: Lucy Murphy; Mikael Shields
- Producers: Patrick Evano; Robin Lyons; Mikael Shields (season 1)
- Cinematography: Lubomir Bakchev; Jean-Pierre Chaligne
- Running time: 10 minutes
- Production companies: Siriol Productions; Folimage; EVA Entertainment (season 1)

Original release
- Network: ITV (CITV) (United Kingdom); Canal J and France 3 (France); KiKA (Germany)
- Release: September 30, 1999 – 2003

Hilltop Hospital (French: Hôpital Hilltop) is a claymation television series made in 1999, directed by Pascal Le Nôtre. It is adapted from a series of books by Nicholas Allan of the same name.

The theme tune and incidental music for the English version of the series was composed by Ben Heneghan and Ian Lawson who also composed the music for the original and mid-2000s Fireman Sam series and Joshua Jones.

== List of characters ==
The hospital is staffed by adult animals with mainly young animals as patients. Regular characters include:

- Dr. Matthews – A dog who seeks the romantic attention of Surgeon Sally.
- Nurse Kitty – A cat who seeks the romantic attention of Dr. Matthews, who, for the most part, appears not to notice.
- Surgeon Sally – A hippo who is a workaholic surgeon and has no time for Dr Matthews' attention.
- Clare and Arthur – Two rats who provide technical and laboratory services.
- Dr Atticus – A tortoise who is the anesthetist and often falls asleep.
- The Two Teds – Two identical twin bears who drive the hospital ambulance and work as orderlies.

The English-language version featured the voices of Kevin Whately (Dr. Matthews), Sally Ann Marsh (Nurse Kitty), Celia Imrie (Surgeon Sally), Paul Shane (The Two Teds), Brian Murphy (Dr. Atticus), Julie Higginson (Clare the lab rat) and Jonathan Kydd (Arthur the Lab Rat). Guest voices included Dame Thora Hird as Gracey Greyshell in Gracey Greyshell's Last Day.

== Episodes ==
=== Season 1 (1999; UK - 2000; France) ===
1. Heart Trouble (30 September 1999; UK)
2. Easter Bunnies (1 October 1999)
3. Blood Bank (2 October 1999)
4. The Big Event (4 October 1999)
5. Rag Week at Hilltop (5 October 1999)
6. The Big Match (6 October 1999)
7. Gracey Greyshell's Last Day (7 October 1999)
8. Fire Alert (8 October 1999)
9. Happy Birthday, Dr. Matthews! (11 October 1999)
10. The Mystery Illness (12 October 1999)
11. Radio Hilltop (13 October 1999)
12. Nurse Kitty's a Star (14 October 1999)
13. The Ghost of Hilltop
14. Blind as a Bat
15. Accidents Will Happen
16. Lift-off at Hilltop
17. A Perfect Wedding
18. Flower-Power
19. Dogs Dinner
20. Weasel Kneasal
21. Mouth-to-Mouth
22. All Creatures Great and Small
23. Butterflies in My Tummy
24. The Bear Who Wouldn't Share
25. Press-ups and Bunny Hops
26. Pamela's Secret

=== Season 2 (2001; UK/France) ===
1. Secret Beds
2. Saving Your Bacon
3. Teething Trouble
4. The Hyper Hedgehog
5. Lazy Eye
6. Laughter is the Best Medecine
7. Bully For You
8. Hot and Bothered
9. Nits
10. Nightmare at Hilltop
11. A Good Sketch
12. Fond Memory
13. C-C-Caspar
14. Smoke Gets in Your Eyes
15. Safety First
16. Wee Trouble
17. Testing Time
18. Earache at Hilltop
19. Larger Than Life
20. Smile
21. New Talent
22. Skin Deep
23. An Extra Pair of Hands
24. Siamese Twins
25. Cold Feet
26. The Blues

== Development ==
The series is co-produced by British company Siriol Productions and French companies Folimage and EVA Entertainment (season 1) for France 3, Canal J, ITV, and German network ZDF, with Buena Vista Home Entertainment handling all European video rights. The first season was pre-sold to Canal J for an air date in 1999, while France 3 would air the series in the Spring of 2000.
