= Aruhan Galieva =

British singer, actress (b. 1991)

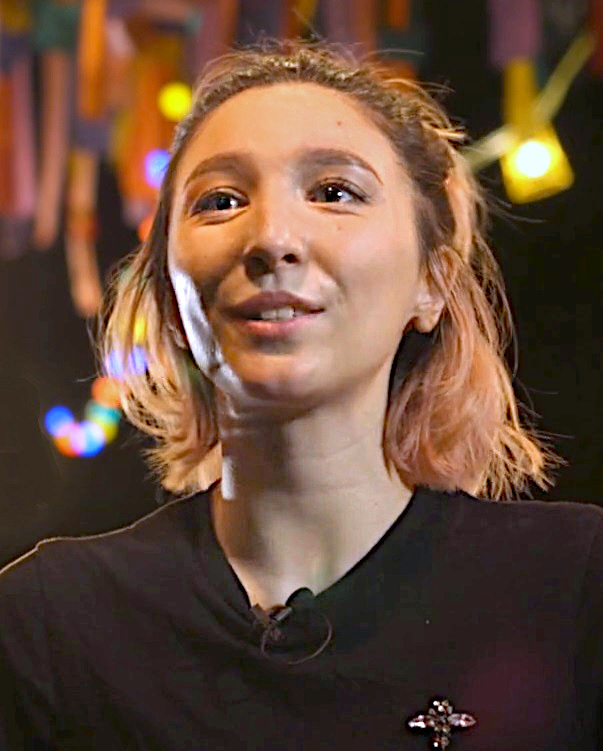
- Galieva in 2019

Background information
- Born: Aruhan Maratovna Bisengalieva; August 1991 (age 35); Leeds, England
- Genre: Classical
- Instruments: vocals; piano; double bass
- Years active: 2003–present
- Label: Sony BMG
- Website: www.aruhan.co.uk

Aruhan Galieva (born August 1991) is a British-Kazakh actress, musician, comedian, and environmentalist.

== Early life ==
Galieva was born in Leeds, Yorkshire to Kazakh violinist Marat Bisengaliev and British flutist Stina Wilson. She began singing as a child and worked with Karl Jenkins, performing from the age of 11. She attended the King's School, Canterbury from 2005 to 2010. She was a music scholar and chorister at school. Galieva joined the National Youth Theatre's REP Company.

== Career ==
=== Music ===
She performed her singing debut aged 11 at the Abai Opera Theatre in Almaty, Kazakhstan. This was followed by her British debut at the Royal Albert Hall, London when she was 13. Galieva gained prominence through her work as a solo soprano on Karl Jenkins' Tlep under Sony BMG and her work on the follow-up album Shakarim which was premiered at the Royal Festival Hall.

=== Acting and comedy ===
In 2012, Galieva appeared in Joe Wright's film adaptation of Anna Karenina. In 2014, she was one of the leads in the BBC Three film Glasgow Girls, a true story about the titular activists. In 2015, she made her professional theatre debut at Shakespeare's Globe as Blanche of Castile in James Dacre's production of King John.

In 2016, Galieva appeared in "Men Against Fire", an episode of the anthology series Black Mirror. From 2017 to 2018, she played Besa Kotti in the BBC medical soap opera Doctors. In 2020, she appeared in "Can You Hear Me", the seventh episode for the twelfth series of Doctor Who.

Galieva brought her first solo comedy show Eco Maniac to the 2022 Brighton Fringe Festival, for which she was awarded a Luke Rollason bursary. She was nominated for the Offie for her supporting performance as Lauren in Kinky Boots at the Queen's Theatre, Hornchurch. She has writing credits on the web series Nasty Neighbours and The B@it, as well as the SeanceCast.

In July 2025, Galieva appeared in BBC Radio 4 comedy series Time of the Week as part of an ensemble cast of character comedians.

=== Politics and advocacy ===
In the 2022 local elections, Galieva unsuccessfully stood to represent Abbey Wood for the Green Party on Greenwich Council. At the 2024 General Election, Galieva was the Green Party candidate for South Derbyshire. She became an ambassador for the Bat Conservation Trust.

== Filmography ==
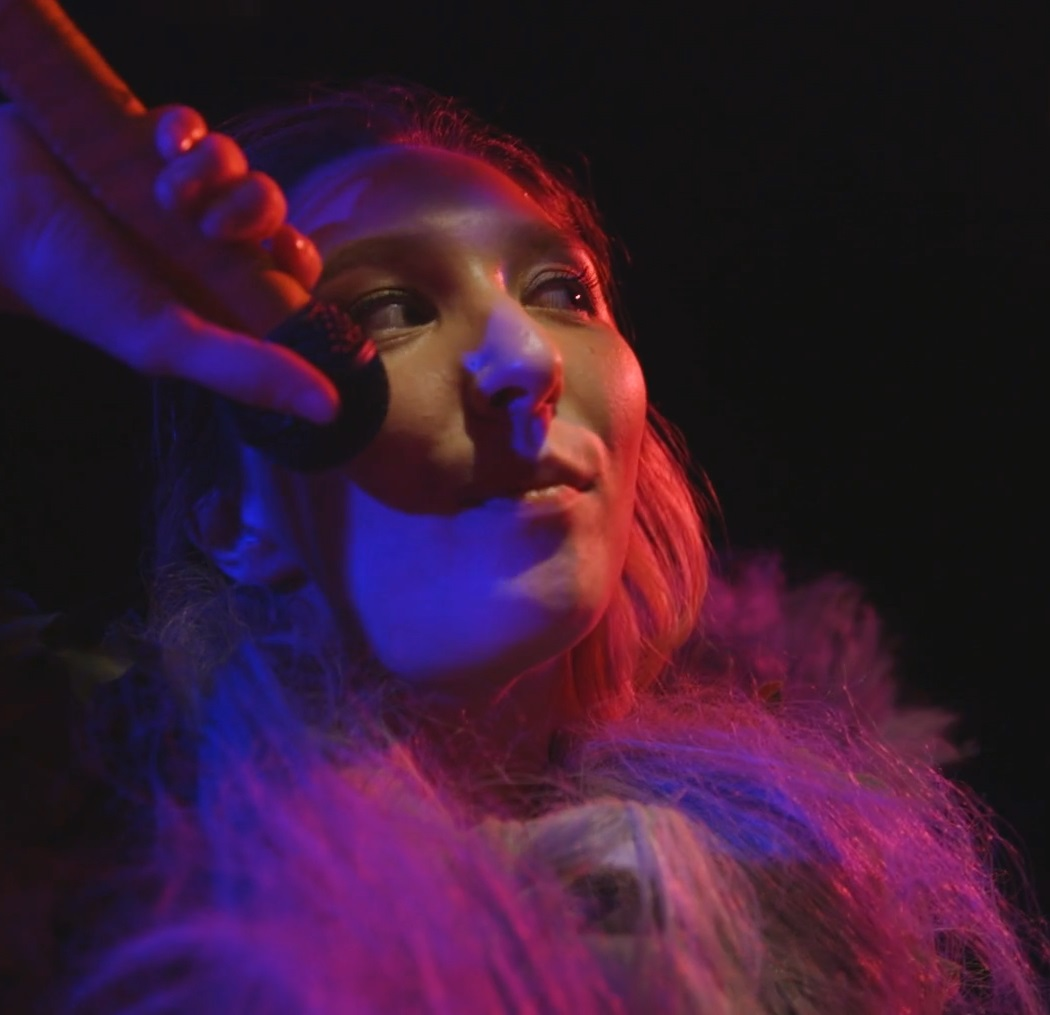
Aruhan Galieva Twelfth Night - Southwark Playhouse Theatre 2019

Year	Title	Role	Notes
2011	Whitechapel	Ana	1 episode
2012	Anna Karenina	Aruhan	
2014	Coalition Fangirls	Jenny	Short film
2014	Glasgow Girls	Roza Salih	Television film
2016	Black Mirror	Village Mother	Episode: "Men Against Fire"
2018	Doctors	Besa Kotti	9 episodes
2019	We Have Always Lived in the Castle	Merricat	Short film
2020	Doctor Who	Tahira	Episode: "Can You Hear Me?"
2022	The Emily Atack Show		4 episodes
2026	Shakespeare & Hathaway: Private Investigators	Bea Gardiner	

== Stage ==
Year	Title	Role	Notes
2015	King John	Blanche of Castile	Globe Theatre, London / Royal & Derngate, Northampton
2015	Bakkhai	Bakkhai	Almeida Theatre, London
2016	The Two Gentlemen of Verona	Silvia	Globe Theatre, London / Everyman Theatre, Liverpool / Europe tour
2017	Twelfth Night	Olivia	Watermill Theatre, Bagnor
2017	Romeo and Juliet	Juliet	Watermill Theatre, Bagnor
2018	Much Ado About Nothing	Hero	Globe Theatre, London
2018	The Comedy of Errors	Luciana	Royal Shakespeare Company (First Encounters Tour)
2019	Twelfth Night	Feste	Southwark Playhouse, London
2020	My Cousin Rachel	Louise	Theatre Royal, Bath / UK tour
2021	Gin Craze!	Mary	Royal & Derngate, Northampton
2022	Kinky Boots	Lauren	New Wolsey Theatre, Ipswich / Queen's Theatre, Hornchurch
2023	The Fair Maid of the West	Roughman	Swan Theatre, Stratford-upon-Avon
