= Where Willy Went =

2006 children's book by Nicholas Allan

- Author: Nicholas Allan
- Illustrator: Nicholas Allan
- Cover artist: Nicholas Allan
- Language: English
- Published: 2 February 2006
- Publisher: Penguin Books
- Publication place: United Kingdom
- Pages: 32
- ISBN: 978-0-37-583030-3
- OCLC: 1160652542

Where Willy Went is a British children's picture book written and illustrated by Nicholas Allan.

The book is about a sperm named Willy who lives inside Mr Browne. Just like other 300 million sperms, Willy races trying to catch the prize, an egg.

This book is written in an innocent, warm, accessible language and can be easily read by young children. It is also a useful guide for parents in need of simple explanations for facts of life.
