= Funniest Joke of the Fringe =

- Awarded for: Best single joke (typically a one-liner)
- Venue: Edinburgh Fringe Festival
- Country: United Kingdom
- Presented by: U&Dave
- First award: 2008; 18 years ago
- Currently held by: Mark Simmons (2024)

The Funniest Joke of the Fringe is an award presented each year at the Edinburgh Festival Fringe by the British television channel U&Dave (formerly Dave). The award highlights the best single joke (typically a one-liner) by a standup comedian and is voted on by members of the public from a shortlist selected by a panel of comedy critics.

== Background and context ==
The Edinburgh Fringe Festival takes place each year in August. It is the UK's largest arts festival. Each year hundreds of comedians perform across the city, making it one of the largest comedy festivals in the world.

Although the award often generates headlines and draws attention from around the world it has been broadly criticised by comedians and critics as a poor representation of comedy in the UK. Since the award's inception only two women have won, and almost every joke that is shortlisted has been a pun. In 2023 winner Lorna Rose Treen stated that she felt men more often won "because there are fewer women in comedy so the likelihood of a woman doing puns is less".

In July 2025 U&Dave announced that they would not be giving the award at that year's festival, stating that they wished to continue to support grassroots comedy in other ways.

== Previous winners ==
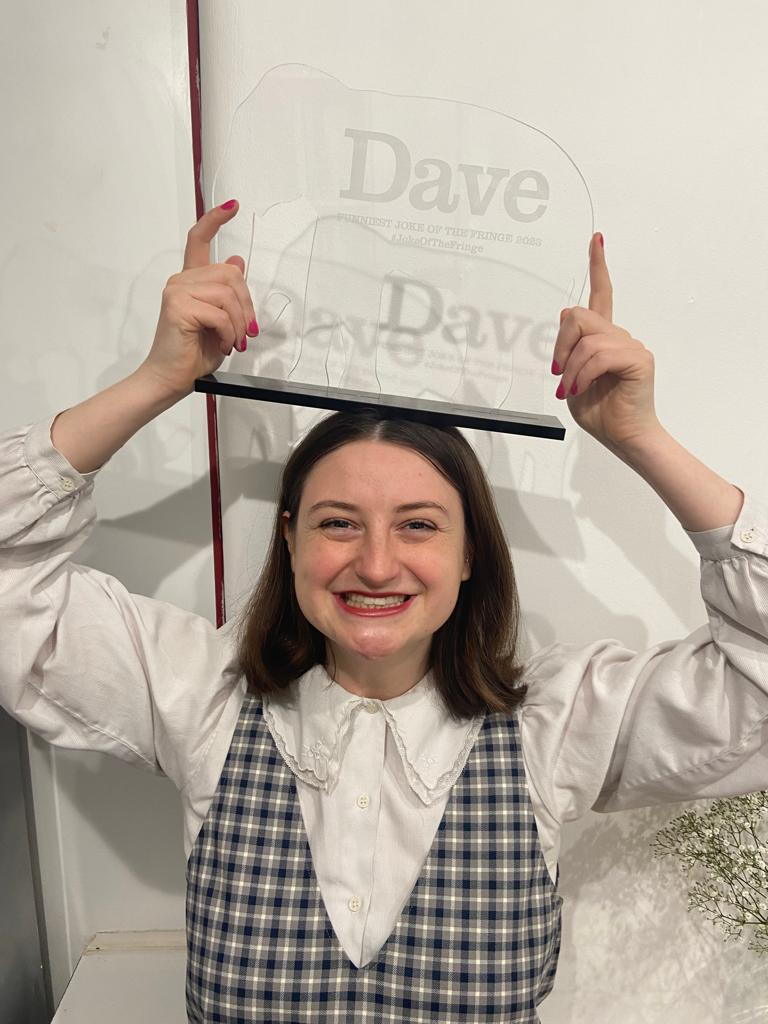
Lorna Rose Treen, 2023's winner, and her award

Year	Comedian	Winning Joke
~~2025~~	Not held	
2024	Mark Simmons	I was going to sail around the globe in the world’s smallest ship, but I bottled it.
2023	Lorna Rose Treen	I started dating a zookeeper, but it turned out he was a cheetah.
2022	Masai Graham	I tried to steal spaghetti from the shop, but the female guard saw me and I couldn't get pasta.
2021	Masai Graham	I thought the word "Caesarean" began with the letter "S" but when I looked in the dictionary, it was in the "C" section.
~~2020~~	Not held due to COVID-19 pandemic	
2019	Olaf Falafel	I keep randomly shouting out "Broccoli" and "Cauliflower" – I think I might have Florets.
2018	Adam Rowe	Working at the job centre has to be a tense job – knowing that if you get fired, you still have to come in the next day.
2017	Ken Cheng	I'm not a fan of the new pound coin, but then again, I hate all change.
2016	Masai Graham	My dad has suggested that I register for a donor card. He's a man after my own heart.
2015	Darren Walsh	I just deleted all the German names off my phone. It's Hans free.
2014	Tim Vine	I've decided to sell my Hoover – well, it was just collecting dust.
2013	Rob Auton	I heard a rumour that Cadbury is bringing out an oriental chocolate bar. Could be a Chinese Wispa.
2012	Stewart Francis	You know who really gives kids a bad name? Posh and Becks.
2011	Nick Helm	I needed a password eight characters long so I picked Snow White and the Seven Dwarves.
2010	Tim Vine	I've just been on a once-in-a-lifetime holiday. I'll tell you what, never again.
2009	Dan Antopolski	Hedgehogs. Why can't they just share the hedge?
2008	Zoe Lyons	I can't believe Amy Winehouse self-harms. She's so irritating she must be able to find someone to do it for her.

== Records ==
- Masai Graham and Tim Vine are the only acts to win the award more than once, with Masai winning it three times (2016, 2021 and 2022) and Tim winning it twice (2010 and 2014).
- Adele Cliff was featured in the top 10 every Fringe from 2016 to 2021, a record five lists in a row.
- Five acts have had two jokes in the same year's top 10: Gary Delaney (2010), Stewart Francis (2012), Tim Vine (2012), Olaf Falafel (2022 and 2024), and Mark Simmons (2024).
- The 2021 list was compiled by Will Mars. In lieu of the sponsored list, which was not running that year, he organised the "(Some guy called) Dave Joke of the Fringe 2021". The winner was chosen by a random member of the public called Dave whom Mars found by walking up the Royal Mile in Edinburgh.

== Most Top 10 Jokes ==
Name	Top 10 Jokes
Olaf Falafel	7
Masai Graham	6
Tim Vine	5
Adele Cliff	5
Mark Simmons	4
Mark Watson	3

== See also ==
- Edinburgh Comedy Awards
