= Alastair Chisholm =

Scottish children's writer

Alastair Chisholm is a Scottish children's writer and puzzle maker.

His Inch and Grub won the 2022 Queen's Knickers Award. and the Scottish Book Trust's 2022 Bookbug Children's Picture Book Prize.

Orion Lost was a finalist in "younger fiction" section of the 2021 Waterstones Children's Book Prize.

One Hungry Dragon was published in 2023.

Reek, a dystopian thriller with illustrations by George Caltsoudas, received the 2016 United Kingdom Literacy Association Award in the 7 to 10+ category.
