= Time of the Week =

- Genre: Comedy
- Running time: 30 minutes
- Country of origin: United Kingdom
- Language: English
- Home station: BBC Radio 4
- Starring: Sian Clifford; Ada Player; Alice Cockayne; Aruhan Galieva; Em Prendergast; Jodie Mitchell; Jonathan Oldfield; Lorna Rose Treen; Mofé Akàndé; Sara Segovia
- Created by: Jonathan Oldfield; Lorna Rose Treen
- Written by: Alice Cockayne; Catherine Brinkworth; Jodie Mitchell; Jonathan Oldfield; Lorna Rose Treen; Priya Hall; Will Hughes
- Produced by: Ben Walker
- Original release: July 6, 2024
- No. of series: 2
- No. of episodes: 8
- Website: Official website

Time of the Week is a BBC Radio 4 comedy series, starring Sian Clifford as journalist Chloe Slack and an ensemble cast of character comedians including Ada Player, Alice Cockayne, Aruhan Galieva, Em Prendergast, Jodie Mitchell, Jonathan Oldfield, Lorna Rose Treen, Mofé Akàndé and Sara Segovia. The programme parodies live women's current affairs and talk shows.

== Production ==
The first series of Time of the Week was announced in January 2024. In November 2024, it was announced that Time of the Week had been re-commissioned and would be returning for a second series.

=== Casting ===
Sian Clifford was announced to take the central role in the show in June 2024.

== Broadcast ==
The first series of Time of the Week premiered in July 2024 on BBC Radio 4. Series two premiered from December 2025 to January 2026.

== Reception ==
Miranda Sawyer in The Guardian reviewed the first episode of Time of the Week as "a pitch-perfect satire inspired by Woman’s Hour".

In February 2025, Time of the Week won the British Comedy Guide's Best Radio Sketch Show 2024 award and was shortlisted for Chortle’s Radio Award. In March 2025, Sian Clifford was shortlisted for the BBC Audio Drama Awards in the category Best Comedy Performance for her performance in Time of the Week. In April 2025, Time of the Week was shortlisted for the Audio and Radio Industry Awards in the category Best Comedy Award (Show or Presenter).

== Episodes ==
=== Series 1 ===
1. Breastfeeding, Country Music, Forearms
2. Deepfakes, Vaping, Richard III
3. Perfume, the Menopause, Gen Z
4. Plastic Surgery, Inducing Childbirth, Sabotage

=== Series 2 ===
1. Wives, Ankles, Underwear
2. 81st Anniversary Special
3. Feminist Poetry, Betrayal, Pool Parties
4. Women Drivers, The Pill, Wicker

== Awards ==
Year	Award	Category	Result	Ref.
2025	British Comedy Guide Awards 2024	Best Radio Sketch Show 2024	Won	
2025	Chortle	Radio Award	Nominated	
2025	BBC Audio Drama Awards	Best Comedy Performance (Sian Clifford)	Nominated	
2025	Audio and Radio Industry Awards	Best Comedy Award (Show or Presenter)	Nominated	
