= Ali Brice =

UK-based alternative comedian, character comedian, and actor

Ali Brice is a UK-based alternative comedian, character comedian, and actor who regularly performs at the Edinburgh Fringe Festival. He has toured internationally as a stage actor and regularly features in high-profile television commercials.

== Career ==
Brice began performing comedy in 2010 and is a regular performer at alternative comedy clubs in the UK, including ACMS and Weirdos. He took his first show, Eric Meat Wants to Go Shopping, to the Edinburgh Fringe in 2014, with Chortle calling him 'joyously bonkers'. That same year Time Out named him as one of their 'ones to watch' in a list of character comedians.

In 2015, he took his second show, Eric Meat Has No Proof Only Memories of Pasta, to the Edinburgh Fringe and Fest Mag interviewed him as a prominent figure of alternative comedy with a DIY ethic. That same year Brice took on the title role of Graeme in Graeme of Thrones - a parody of Game of Thrones – which debuted at the Leicester Square Theatre and was reviewed positively by The Times before touring the UK, Australia and North America

He has been to the fringe each year since 2014, most recently with I Tried to Be Funny, But You Weren't Looking. Directed by Jonny Freeman (BBC EastEnders' Reiss Colwell), the show received a 4 star review hailing Brice as a 'comedic genius' and earned him a nomination for Best Show in the British Comedy Guide's Comedians' Choice Awards. The show transferred to the Soho Theatre in July 2023 for a two night sold out run.

In 2018, he appeared in Spencer Jones' The Mind of Herbert Clunkerdunk and starred in his first advert, promoting J2O in their 'Find Your Mojo' campaign. Other TV commercials Brice has appeared in include PokerStars, Ladbrokes and HELLA

In 2020, he co-starred in Lad Pad with Joz Norris, with whom he co-wrote the series.
