= Don't Blow the Inheritance =

2012 British quiz show

- Genre: Quiz show
- Presented by: Tim Vine
- Country of origin: United Kingdom
- Original language: English
- No. of series: 1
- No. of episodes: 10

Production
- Running time: 60 minutes (inc. adverts)
- Production company: 12 Yard

Original release
- Network: ITV
- Release: 20 August – 31 August 2012

Don't Blow the Inheritance is a 5:00 pm daytime quiz show that aired on ITV from 20 to 31 August 2012 for a ten-episode run as a summer replacement for The Chase, the other being Tipping Point. It was hosted by stand-up comedian Tim Vine.

The show was also repeated on ITV at 3am in July-October of 2015.

== Format ==
Four teams, each composed of two family members from different generations ("offspring" and "elder"), competed on each episode to build up as large a prize pot ("inheritance fund") as possible. The two members of each team did not confer at any time and were positioned so that neither could see the other's face.

At the end of each round, the team with the lowest total were eliminated with no winnings. If there was a tie for low score, a sudden-death question would be asked on the buzzer in the same format as Round One (see below); a correct answer allowed the team to continue in the game, but a miss eliminated them.

=== Round One (Questions Requiring Answers) ===
The host asked a series of 15 general-knowledge toss-up questions, for which only the offspring would buzz-in. As soon as an offspring did so, that team's elder needed to answer the question. A correct response added £1,000 to the team's inheritance fund, but a miss awarded that amount to all three opposing teams. If an offspring buzzed-in whilst a question was being read, the elder would've been required to respond based only on the portion heard up to that point.

=== Round Two (Top 10s) ===
The remaining three teams played this round individually, in descending order of score. Each offspring chose one of four categories; the host then asked a question, and the elder had 30 seconds to come up with as many of the top 10 answers as possible. (E.g. naming the 10 characters who have made the most appearances on the soap opera Coronation Street.) Every correct answer was worth £1,000; there were no penalties for incorrect answers, but the elder would need to wait for the host to indicate whether or not an answer was correct before giving another one.

=== The Semi-Final (Clues) ===
Three clues to a subject were revealed, one at a time. As in Round One, only the offspring might've buzzed-in at any time, and the corresponding elder had to then guess the subject. A correct answer awarded £1,000 to that team, while a miss gave the money to their opponents. A total of 10 subjects were played.

=== The Final Round (Rule Reversal) ===
The offspring of the remaining team had to answer a series of questions with no help from their elder. There was initially no fixed time limit for the offspring to respond, and they would win the entire inheritance fund by answering the first five questions correctly. However, upon the first miss, the fund began to decrease in steps, at a rate of £100 per 0.4 second (£500 every two seconds). They may have not been able to not return to passed or missed questions. If the offspring gave a total of five correct answers, including any given before the first miss, they would win the remaining total in the inheritance fund. If the fund reached zero, they would leave with nothing.

A team could win up to £35,000 over the course of the entire game.
