= Laurence Owen (composer) =

British composer, musician, comedian and actor

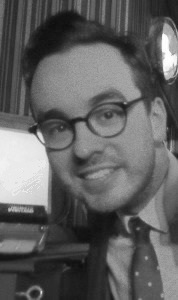
- Laurence Owen backstage in 2015

Background information
- Born: Laurence Owen; 14 March 1989 (age 37)
- Genres: Musical comedy
- Occupations: Singer-songwriter, composer, comedian, actor
- Years active: 1997–present
- Website: mrlaurenceowen.com (entertainer website), laurenceowen.co.uk (composer website)

Laurence Owen is a British composer, musician, comedian and actor.

== Early career ==
Laurence Owen's career began in the 1990s as a child actor. He had notable credits in the feature film Wilde (playing Vyvyan Wilde opposite Stephen Fry) and the BBC period drama Berkeley Square, in which he had a recurring role.

== Composer ==
Owen attended Brighton University from which he graduated with First Class Honours in Digital Music and Sound Arts.

Since 2011 he has written music for a number of stage and film projects, including several short pieces for film festivals. In 2013, he won the Früh Kölsch Audience Award for Best Music in a Short Film for his score for the animated short White Morning. In the Autumn of the same year he provided sound design for 1927 Productions' Golem, which was first performed at the Salzburg Festival before transferring to the Young Vic, London, and the Théâtre de la Ville, Paris. For his work on Golem, he was nominated for Best Theatre Sound at the Pro Sound Awards 2015.

Owen was composer and musical director of the live music and cartoon theatre show Cat & Mouse, a 1927 and Village Underground co-production which was also part of the 2017 Latitude Festival.

In 2019, he acted as arranger and music producer of songs by Richard Thomas (musician) for the National Theatre of Scotland production My Left / Right Foot - The Musical.

== Music ==
From 2009 to 2012, Owen played bass for The Indelicates appearing on their albums David Koresh Superstar and Diseases of England.

His concept album South of the River was released at the beginning of 2012. Genre Fiction, an album of orchestral compositions, was released in 2018.

Since 2016, he has played bass for musical impressionists Jess Robinson and Christina Bianco.

== Comedy ==
While a member of The Indelicates, Owen had experimented with humour, singing and accompanying himself on the guitar. He did not believe this was well received by audiences at music gigs, so he developed and took an act to comedy bills.

He has been a regular on the London cabaret circuit since late 2011, providing short turns on variety and comedy nights. In addition to solo performances, he has also contributed to a number of comedy collectives, including Adam Larter's Weirdos Comedy Club for which he has appeared in two 'alternative pantomimes' among other productions. As well as acting in these shows he has provided original music; recordings of songs from the pantomimes have been issued as digital downloads with the proceeds donated to Great Ormond Street Hospital.

He has also appeared in full-length shows as part of the Edinburgh Fringe Festival. In the first, 'Owen and Bettesworth Sung and Unsung' (2012), he performed with stand-up comedian Oli Bettesworth. They made a "mini sit-com" in daily instalments to accompany this and released it via YouTube and other media.

His first solo show was Lullabies of Pervland(2014). An album of the same title was made available to complement it, featuring studio versions of most of the songs from the set.

His contribution to the 2015 Fringe, Cinemusical won him that year's Malcolm Hardee Award for 'Act Most Likely To Make A Million Quid'.

His other Edinburgh Fringe shows include Cinemusical High in 2016, and The Time Machine in 2017, which he performed with his wife and co-writer, Lindsay Sharman.

In 2014 he was a finalist at the Musical Comedy Awards.

== Personal life ==
He is married to comedian, actress and writer Lindsay Sharman.

== Discography ==
=== Albums ===
Studio

- South of the River (2012)
- Lullabies of Pervland (2014)
- Cinemusical (2015)
- Cinemusical High (2016)
- The Time Machine (2017)
- Genre Fiction (2018)

Cast recordings

- The Hound of the Baskervilles (2011)

Soundtracks

- The Hound of the Baskervilles (score) (2011)

Compilations

- Sung (2012)
- Bad Hair Years (2016)

=== EPs ===
- Yarnripper (2010)
- Offcuts (2011)
- Carmelite (2012)
- The David Lynch EP (2014)
- Weirdos For Christmas Number 1 (2015)

=== Singles ===
- “Kith and Kin (A Christmas Song)” (2012)
- "Baltimore Whores" (2013)
- "The Ballad of Maddy Ferguson / The David Lynch Guide To Coffee" (2013)
- "A Christmas Tail: Weirdos Panto 2014" (2014)
- "Disappointing Sequel" (2015)
- "The Christmas Movie Song" (2015)
- "When She's There" (2019)
