= Ben Target =

UK based alternative comedian

Ben Target is a UK based alternative comedian who won the Leicester Mercury Comedian of the Year in 2011.

Target is renowned for his absurdist approach to comedy and has been gaining a cult following on the UK circuit since 2010. His shows are well known for being, surreal, absurd and different, often utilising storytelling and props to punctuate his narratives. In 2011 he found success as joint winner of the Leicester Mercury Comedy award alongside Tom Rosenthal. The following year he was nominated for the Fosters Comedy Award newcomer.

Target is a regular performer at some of the most prestigious alternative comedy clubs in the UK, including ACMS, Weirdos and the Invisible Dot. In 2012 Target featured on BBC Three's Comedy at the Fringe.

In 2023, Target performed a new show, Lorenzo, as part of the Edinburgh Festival Fringe. The show tells the story of how he gave up comedy in 2020 to become a live-in carer for his non-biological Uncle Lorenzo.
