= Let's Play Darts =

- Genre: Sports
- Presented by: Gabby Logan
- Country of origin: United Kingdom
- Original language: English
- No. of series: 2
- No. of episodes: 11

Production
- Running time: 30–60 minutes
- Production company: Zeppotron

Original release
- Network: BBC Two
- Release: 1 March 2015 – 13 March 2016

Let's Play Darts is a charity sports show hosted by Gabby Logan on BBC Two. The show has also been called Let's Play Darts for Comic Relief (2015) and Let's Play Darts for Sport Relief (2016). The show sees celebrities team up with professional darts players to play five rounds of darts before announcing a winner. The winner from each quarter-final episode goes through to the semi-final rounds.

== Episode guide ==
=== Series 1 (2015) ===
The series was filmed on 3–4 September, and aired in early March in the lead-up to the Comic Relief fundraiser marathon.

The series also featured Comic Relief appeal films from Lenny Henry, Liza Tarbuck, Emma Willis and Angela Griffin as well as presenter Gabby Logan.

==== Participants ====
Celebrity	Known for	Darts Nickname	Professional Partner	Status
Martin Offiah	Former Rugby Player	"Chariots"	Anastasia Dobromyslova	Lost 1st quarter-final On 1 March 2015
Liza Tarbuck	Actress and Presenter	"Queen of Darts"	Bobby George	Lost 2nd quarter-final On 2 March 2015
Sean Lock	Comedian	"The Midwife"	Ted Hankey	Lost 3rd quarter-final On 3 March 2015
Bob Mortimer	Comedian	"Carpets"	Andy Fordham	Lost 4th quarter-final On 4 March 2015
Richard Osman	Television Presenter	"Big Frimley Giant"	Deta Hedman	Lost 1st semi-final On 5 March 2015
Roisin Conaty	Comedian and Actress	"The Wedding Slinger"	Richie George	Lost 2nd semi-final On 6 March 2015
Tim Vine	Comedian and Actor	"The Punaway Train"	Darryl Fitton	Runner-up; On 8 March 2015
Lee Mack	Comedian and Actor	"Hit The Board"	Martin Adams	Winner; On 8 March 2015

==== Matches ====
===== Quarter-finals =====
The quarter-final matches were aired between 1 and 4 March 2015. Each match was the best of 9 legs (or the first to 5 legs).

Episode	Airdate	Round	Team 1	Score	Team 2
1	1 March 2015	Quarter Final 1	Mack/Adams	5–1	Offiah/Dobromyslova
2	2 March 2015	Quarter Final 2	Osman/Hedman	5–3	Tarbuck/B George
3	3 March 2015	Quarter Final 3	Lock/Hankey	2–5	Vine/Fitton
4	4 March 2015	Quarter Final 4	Conaty/R George	5–4	Mortimer/Fordham

===== Semi-finals =====
The semi-final matches were aired on 5 and 6 March 2015. Each match was the best of 11 legs (or the first to 6 legs).

Episode	Airdate	Round	Team 1	Score	Team 2
5	5 March 2015	Semi Final 1	Mack/Adams	6–0	Osman/Hedman
6	6 March 2015	Semi Final 2	Vine/Fitton	6–2	Conaty/R George

===== Final =====
The Final was aired on 8 March 2015. It was the best of 15 legs (or the first to 8 legs).

Episode	Airdate	Round	Team 1	Score	Team 2
7	8 March 2015	Final	Mack/Adams	8–5	Vine/Fitton

=== Series 2 (2016) ===
It was announced on 8 October 2015 that the programme will return for a second series for Sport Relief on 21 February 2016 and will feature brand new competitors, including the return of the "Punaway Train" from last year, Tim Vine. Vassos Alexander announced that Deta Hedman's partner was Jon Richardson.

==== Participants ====
Celebrity	Known for	Darts Nickname	Professional Partner	Status
Jordan Stephens	Singer	"The Dartbreaker"	Anastasia Dobromyslova	Lost 1st quarter-final On 21 February 2016
Katherine Ryan	Comedian	"Moose Knuckles"	Andy Fordham	Lost 2nd quarter-final On 21 February 2016
Robbie Savage	Former footballer and pundit	"The Treble Maker"	Bobby George	Lost 3rd quarter-final On 28 February 2016
Jon Richardson	Comedian	"The Lancashire HotShot"	Deta Hedman	Lost 4th quarter-final On 28 February 2016
Greg Davies	Comedian and actor	"The Abominable Throwman"	Martin Adams	Lost 1st semi-final On 6 March 2016
Kate Humble	Wildlife expert and television presenter	"Wild Thing"	Glen Durrant	Lost 2nd semi-final On 6 March 2016
Mike Tindall	Former rugby player	"The Titan"	Scott Mitchell	Runner-up; On 13 March 2016
Tim Vine	Comedian and actor	"The Punaway Train"	Darryl Fitton	Winner; On 13 March 2016

==== Matches ====
===== Quarter-finals =====
The quarter-final matches were aired on 21 and 28 February 2016. Each match was the best of 9 legs (or the first to 5 legs).

Episode	Airdate	Round	Team 1	Score	Team 2
1	21 February 2016	Quarter Final 1	Davies/Adams	5–3	Stephens/Dobromyslova
1	21 February 2016	Quarter Final 2	Ryan/Fordham	4–5	Tindall/Mitchell
2	28 February 2016	Quarter Final 3	Savage/George	2–5	Vine/Fitton
2	28 February 2016	Quarter Final 4	Richardson/Hedman	2–5	Humble/Durrant

===== Semi-finals =====
The semi-final matches were aired on 6 March 2016. Each match was the best of 11 legs (or the first to 6 legs).

Episode	Airdate	Round	Team 1	Score	Team 2
3	6 March 2016	Semi Final 1	Davies/Adams	1–6	Tindall/Mitchell
3	6 March 2016	Semi Final 2	Vine/Fitton	6–0	Humble/Durrant

===== Final =====
The Final was aired on 13 March 2016. It was the best of 15 legs (or the first to 8 legs).

Episode	Airdate	Round	Team 1	Score	Team 2
4	13 March 2016	Final	Tindall/Mitchell	7–8	Vine/Fitton

== Transmissions ==
Series	Start date	End date	Episodes
1	1 March 2015	8 March 2015	7
2	21 February 2016	13 March 2016	4
