= Sunday Assembly =

Non-religious gathering

- The assembly at Conway Hall on 19 October 2014
- Formation: 6 January 2013; 13 years ago
- Founders: Sanderson Jones and Pippa Evans
- Legal status: Charity: No. 1162995
- Headquarters: London
- Location: UK, Australia, Germany, Ireland, Netherlands, New Zealand, United States
- Website: www.sundayassembly.com

Sunday Assembly is a non-religious gathering co-founded by Sanderson Jones and Pippa Evans in January 2013 in London, England. The gathering is mostly for non-religious people who want a similar communal experience to a religious church, though religious people are also welcome. As of December 2019, assemblies are established in 48 locations around the world with the majority in Europe and the United States, and are run and funded by volunteers from their communities.

== History ==
Stand-up comedians Sanderson Jones and Pippa Evans started the first Sunday Assembly in North London in January 2013 as they "both wanted to do something like church but without God". The first event, attended by over 300 people, was held in a deconsecrated church in Islington, but due to the limited size of the venue later meetings have been held in Conway Hall. Since then events have continued to be held, twice a month, with one attracting as many as 600 people.

Sunday Assembly generated much press and interest with Stephen Fry discussing it on The Late Late Show with Craig Ferguson. In October 2013, Sunday Assembly started an Indiegogo campaign that raised £33,668 out of a £500,000 goal to fund building a digital platform to help grow the organisation. The formation of satellite congregations was promoted with a 40-day tour through the United Kingdom, Dublin (Ireland), the United States and Australia. The platform is designed to help provide a resource for people wishing to set up their own assembly and to connect with each other.

Sanderson Jones said that he does not "expect much objection from religious communities. They are happy for us to use their church model," but he suspected that there may be "more aggressive atheists who will have an issue with it." However, some Christians objected: William McCrea, the DUP Member of Parliament for South Antrim (Northern Ireland), called the assembly "highly inappropriate", because of its rejection of God and an afterlife. During the initial promotion tour in 2013, Kimberly Winston of the Religion News Service stated that some atheists felt that "getting money is their goal".

Part of the New York City branch split off because they wanted to emphasise the atheist element more than the founders liked.

Responding to questions about lack of diversity in the people to whom Sunday Assemblies appealed, Sanderson Jones said "I don't [think] there's anything that's inherently elite about people getting together to sing songs and think about themselves and improve their community. But we can't wait to see people doing it in all manner of different places in all manner of different ways, that appeal to all manner of different people."

Sunday Assembly has been the subject of widespread academic research, and was featured in the 'How We Gather' report from Harvard University researchers on how millennials are finding community and meaning. In 2018, the journal Secularism and Nonreligion published a six-month longitudinal study of Sunday Assembly participants, which showed a statistically significant improvement in participant's wellbeing.

== Local assemblies ==
Following the initial events held in London, Sunday assemblies have been held in about ninety cities, both in the United Kingdom and in other countries around the world: including the United States (New York City, Los Angeles, Pittsburgh, and San Diego, amongst others), the Netherlands, Germany, New Zealand, Australia, Canada, and Hungary. Since 2018, Sunday Assembly has moved from a centralised model with satellite assemblies adhering to the central charter, to an association model where assemblies follow guidance outlining the principles of The Sunday Assembly and some rules which it is suggested are followed for at least some time, with variations based on geography and local community needs.

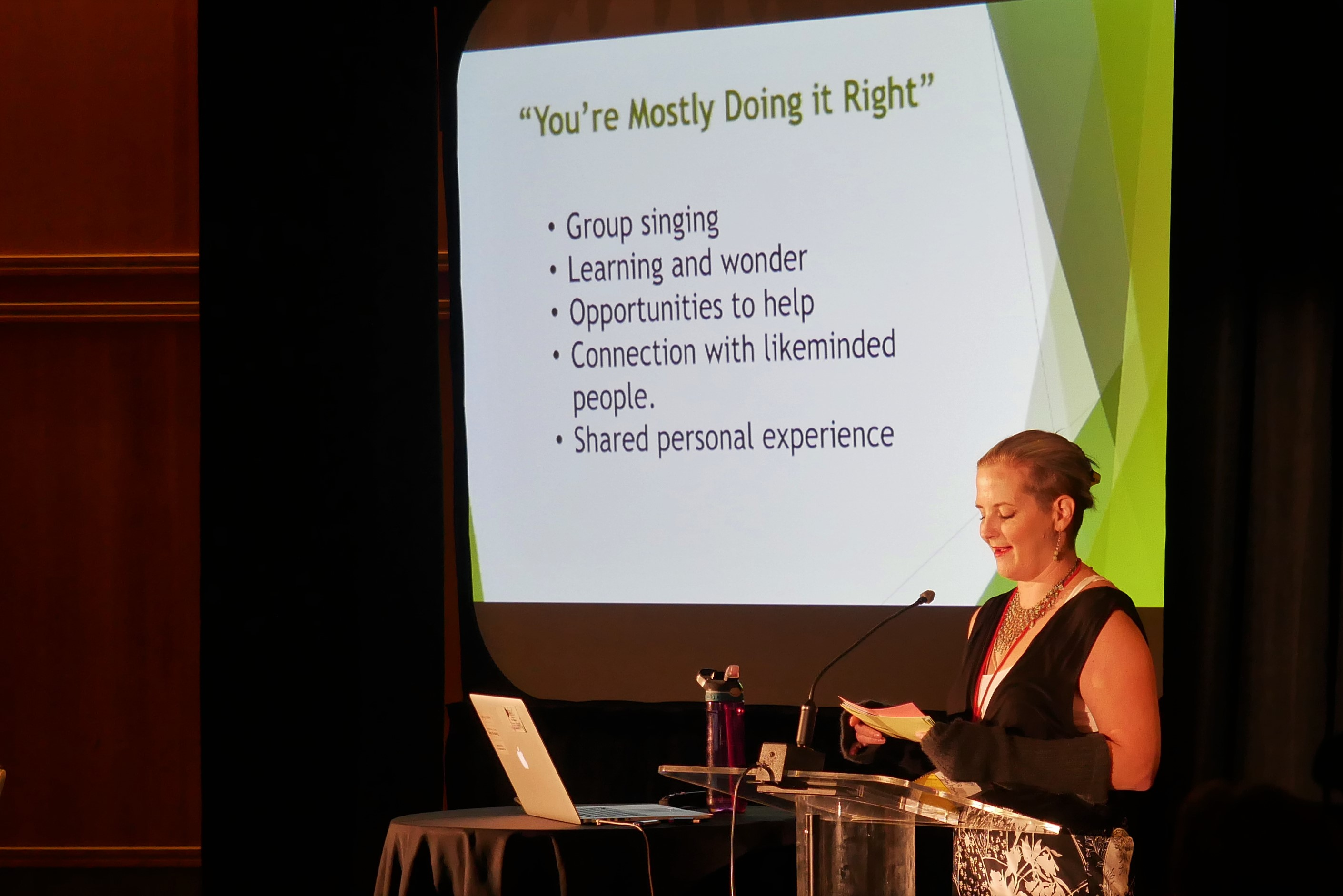
Amy Boyle, Executive Director of Sunday Assembly, Los Angeles, speaking at the 8th Freethought Alliance Conference in 2018

== Activities ==
Attendees listen to talks by speakers such as Sandi Toksvig, socialise, and sing songs by artists such as Stevie Wonder and others. Some assemblies also run social clubs and community support events such as Live Better groups, where members assemble regularly to support each other in their life goals and challenges.

== See also ==
- The School of Life
- Secular religion
- Ethical movement
- Religion of Humanity
- Unitarian Universalism
