= Olaf Falafel =

Comedian and a children's author

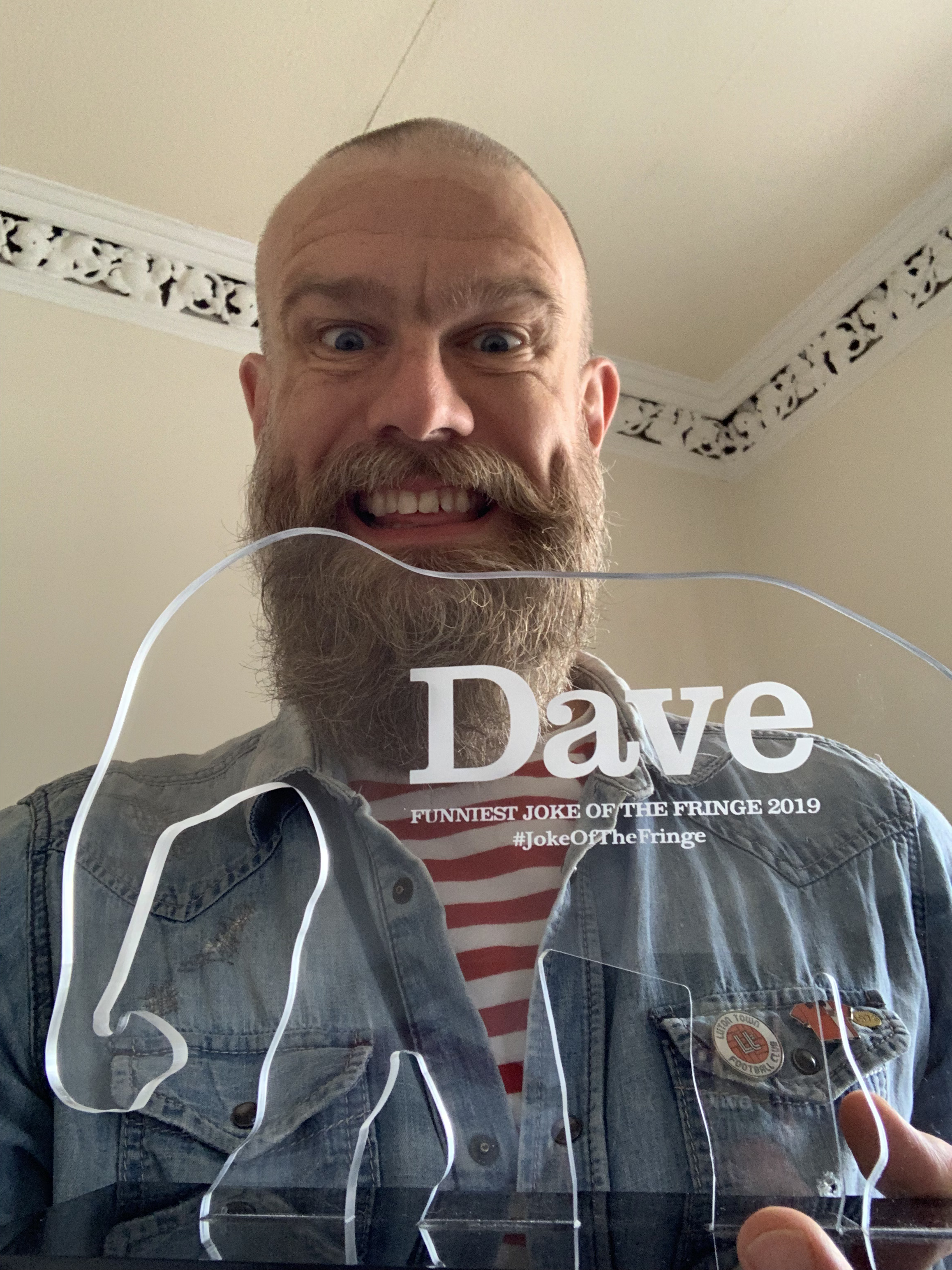
- Falafel with the 2019 Funniest Joke of the Fringe Award
- Born: 1976-1977
- Other name: Olaf Falafel

Comedy career
- Years active: 2012-present
- Website: www.olaffalafel.com

Olaf Falafel is a British comedian and children's author. Falafel illustrates his own books and is the creator and presenter of Art Club, an online art channel for children. He has been a stand-up comedian since 2012 and is known for posting humorous videos on Twitter. His humour frequently involves puns and absurdity.

== Early life ==
Falafel is from Luton.

== Career ==
Falafel worked as an art director before becoming a comedian, and came up with his stage name as part of a workshop at the Tringe Festival, a comedy festival in Tring.

In 2014, he was nominated for the Laughing Horse Comedy Club's New Act of the Year competition. In 2017 he was included in both The Guardian's and The Telegraph's rundowns of the funniest jokes of the Edinburgh Fringe. In 2018 Falafel was in Dave channel's, The Mirror's, The Evening Standard's, The Scotsman's and i News's rundowns of the top jokes of the Edinburgh Fringe and won an award for his festival poster.

Falafel secured a three-book contract with HarperCollins in 2016, after asking for a publisher to approach him in a tweet.

In 2019, Falafel made headlines by winning the Best Joke Of The Fringe. He took the title with the gag: "I keep randomly shouting out 'Broccoli' and 'Cauliflower' – I think I might have florets".

In 2020, Falafel signed a two-book deal with Walker books to illustrate Unleash Your Creative Monster, a "funny and informative" guide to creative writing.

In 2021, off the back of his Art Club YouTube videos, Falafel signed a two-book deal with Puffin to create his first middle grade chapter books called Trixie Pickle Art Avenger about a child who becomes their school's version of Banksy.

In August 2022, Falafel had two jokes in the Best Joke of the Edinburgh Fringe Top Ten list.

In 2023 Falafel's picture book Blobfish won The Society Of Authors Queen's Knickers Award and the Federation of Children's Book Groups' Children's Book Award, and was shortlisted for the Wainwright Prize for Children's Writing on Nature and Conservation.

In March 2024 Falafel won 'Best Kids Show' at the Leicester Comedy Festival, for his show 'Olaf Falafel's Stupidest Super Stupid Show (Yet)'. Falafel also illustrated the map and provided the narration of penguin facts for a "Penguin Parade" sculpture trail in London, exhibited between November 2024 and January 2025.

== Live Shows ==
- 2015 – Expect the Unexporcupine (with Michael Stranney)
- 2016 – Olaf Falafel and the Cheese of Truth
- 2017 – The Marmosets of My Mind
- 2018 – There's no I in Idiot
- 2019 – Olaf Falafel Presents Knitting With Maracas
- 2022 – Olaf Falafel's Super Stupid Show (family friendly show)
- 2022 – Olaf Falafel STOAT
- 2023 – Olaf Falafel's Super Stupid Show 20% More Stupider (family friendly show)
- 2023 – Look What Fell Out Of My Head

== Books ==
- 2017 – Old Macdonald Heard a Parp
- 2017 – Father Christmas Heard a Parp
- 2018 – Old Macdonald Heard a Parp from the Past
- 2019 – It's One Giant Leek For Mankind
- 2021 – Unleash Your Creative Monster
- 2022 – Trixie Pickle Art Avenger
- 2022 – Blobfish
- 2023 – Trixie Pickle Art Avenger - Toxic Takedown
