= Queen's Knickers Award =

Award for children's illustrated book

The Queen's Knickers Award is a British award for a children's illustrated book. It was founded in 2020 and is awarded annually by the Society of Authors for "an outstanding children's original illustrated book for ages 0-7". It is funded by children's author Nicholas Allan and takes its name from his book The Queen's Knickers (1993, Hutchinson: ISBN 978-0091764685).

== Past winners ==
Winners and runners-up
Year	Rank	Author	Title	Publisher & ISBN	Notes
2020	Winner	Elena Arevalo Melville	Umbrella	Scallyway Press: ISBN 978-1912650019	
2020	Runner-up	Didier Lévy and Frederic Benaglia	How to Light Your Dragon	Thames & Hudson: ISBN 978-0500651971	
2021	Winner	Rashmi Sirdeshpande and Daine Ewen	Never Show a T-Rex a Book	Puffin: ISBN 978-0241392669	
2021	Runner-up	Alex T. Smith	Mr. Penguin and the Catastrophic Cruise	Hachette: ISBN 978-1444944570	
2022	Winner	Alastair Chisholm and David Roberts	Inch and Grub: a story about Cavemen	Walker Books: ISBN 978-1406362817	
2022	Runner-up	Mick Jackson and John Broadley	While You’re Sleeping	Pavillion Children's: ISBN 978-1843654650	
2023	Winner	Olaf Falafel	Blobfish	Walker Books: ISBN 978-1406397659	
2023	Runner-up	John Agard and Satoshi Kitamura	When Creature met Creature	Scallywag Press: ISBN 978-1912650507	
2024	Winner	Benjamin Zephaniah and Nila Aye	People Neeed People	Orchard Books, Hachette Children’s Group: ISBN 978-1408368169	
2024	Runner-up	Yoko Mori	Teddy’s Midnight Adventure	Pushkin Press: ISBN 978-1782694014	
