= Lindsay Sharman =

British comedienne and actress

Lindsay Sharman is a British writer, comedian and actress. She is one-half of Long Cat Media, a two-person UK podcast production company specialising in audio fiction.

== Career ==
=== Early career ===
Sharman began her comedy career in 2009. After reaching the finals of the 2010 Funny Women awards, she took two shows to the 2011 Edinburgh Festival Fringe - Giants Of Comedy and A Time Traveller's Guide to Surviving Childhood as part of PBH's Free Fringe. At Edinburgh 2012, she performed in George Ryegold's God-In-A-Bag at the Underbelly Bristo Square. She performed in character as The Poet from 2012 to about 2014.

=== 2014-2019 ===
In 2014, Sharman co-wrote her first theatre production, Madame Magenta: Libros Mystica, which she took to the Edinburgh Festival Fringe as her first solo show. She married collaborator Laurence Owen the following year.

Since then, the pair have co-written four more theatre productions, which they also took to Edinburgh: Cinemusical (2015), Cinemusical High (2016), The Time Machine (2017), which subsequently toured the UK, and Jekyll vs Hyde (2019). Jekyll vs Hyde was nominated for a Broadway World Award for Best Musical Production, and won the Wilton's Music Hall Fringe Foundations Award, in 2019.

=== 2019 to Present ===
In 2019, Lindsay & Laurence co-founded Long Cat Media, a podcast production company specialising in audio fiction. Their first podcast series, Mockery Manor, released on Hallowe'en 2019, was nominated for Best Fiction at the British Podcast Awards 2020.

April 2021 saw the birth of The Ballad of Anne & Mary, Long Cat Media's first full-cast musical, produced completely under lockdown. A swashbuckling pirate epic, it is based on the real lives of pirates Anne Bonny and Mary Read. The story was written by Sharman, and co-directed and co-produced with her partner, Laurence Owen. Anne & Mary was nominated for Best Podcast at the BBC Audio Drama Awards 2022, and Best Fiction at the British Podcast Awards 2022.

In February 2023, Long Cat launched their new horror anthology feed Magenta Presents with the five-part series Ghosted, which Sharman wrote and directed. Ghosted was shortlisted for The Tinniswood Award for Best Audio Drama Script at the BBC Audio Drama Awards 2024.

Sharman created the characters Madame Magenta and Magenta's husband, Bernard, in 2013. She and partner Owen continue to perform in character as Magenta & Bernard on their podcasts and for live audiences. Together as Long Cat Media, their on-going productions include: Mockery Manor (2019), Madame Magenta: Sonos Mystica (2020), Magenta Presents (2023), and We Have A Movie (WHAM, 2024), all of which Sharman writes and directs. She has also been a guest writer on The Amelia Project podcast, and actor on The Amelia Project and Midnight Burger.

== Education ==
Lindsay Sharman holds a Master of Art in Scriptwriting from the University of East Anglia.

== Awards ==
- Tinniswood Award 2024 Nominated: Best Script for Ghosted
- BBC Audio Drama Awards 2024 Nominated: Best Sit Com or Comedy Drama for Mockery Manor
- BBC Audio Drama Awards 2022 Nominated: Best Podcast for The Ballad of Anne & Mary
- British Podcast Awards 2022 Nominated: Best Fiction for The Ballad of Anne & Mary
- British Podcast Awards 2020 Nominated: Best Fiction for Mockery Manor
- Wilton's Music Hall Fringe Foundations Award Winner 2019: Jekyll vs Hyde
- Broadway World Award 2019 Nominated: Best Musical Production for Jekyll vs Hyde
- Hackney Empire New Act of the Year 2013 - Finalist
- Piccadilly Comedy Club New Comedian Of 2013 - Finalist
- Funny Women Award 2010 - Finalist
- Mirth Bath New Act of the Year 2010 - Finalist
