= Nicholas Allan =

British children's writer and illustrator

- Born: 11 December 1956 (age 69); Brighton, England
- Occupations: Illustrator, writer
- Writing career
- Genres: Children's fiction, picture books
- Website: www.nicholasallan.co.uk

Nicholas Allan (born 11 December 1956) is a British children's writer and illustrator.

== Biography ==
Nicholas Allan was born and brought up in Brighton, England, attending Brighton College from 1970 to 1975. He studied at the Slade School of Art and completed an MA in creative writing at the University of East Anglia. He published his first book The Hefty Fairy in 1989, and has since published numerous books for children, including The Magic Lavatory, Demon Teddy, The Queen's Knickers, Where Willy Went and Father Christmas Needs a Wee. Hilltop Hospital has been adapted into an award-winning television series. His other books include The Complete Guide to Gatecrashing and a teenage novel The First Time.

Allan has funded the Society of Authors' Queen's Knickers Award, an annual award for an illustrated children's book. The award was founded in 2020 and is named after his 1993 book The Queen's Knickers.

When not touring, Allan spends most of his time in Brighton, not London.
