= Eleanor Morton (comedian) =

Scottish comedian and writer

- Education: University of Glasgow; Met Film School
- Occupations: Comedian; Actor; Writer
- Years active: 2010–present

YouTube information
- Channel: Eleanor Morton
- Years active: 2012–present
- Subscribers: 98 thousand
- Views: 10.5 million
- Last updated: 15 October 2025
- Website: eleanormortoncomedian.com

Eleanor Morton is a Scottish comedian, actor, and writer.

== Education ==
Morton studied English and Scottish Literature at the University of Glasgow and screenwriting at the Met Film School.

== Career ==
Morton did stand-up comedy while at university; her first gig was in 2010 and in 2013 she reached the semi-finals of the Chortle Student Award. When Morton performed at the Glasgow Comedy Festival the following year, she was picked as one of The List's 'up-and-coming female comedians'. Morton made her Edinburgh Fringe debut in 2014 with her show titled 'Lollipop'.

During COVID lockdowns, Morton began creating videos in the character of Craig, a jaded guide giving tours around cultural sites such as a whisky distillery. The viral videos resulted in "a wave of new fans", and she was "one of the comedians to come out of lockdown with their reputation enhanced". Morton's 2022 show, 'Eleanor Morton Has Peaked', drew on her experiences of lockdown. She is a board member of The Alternative Comedy Memorial Society, and co-hosted their 2021 Edinburgh Fringe show.

Morton co-wrote and co-starred in The Rest of Us with Mary Flanigan and Esyllt Sears. The show was broadcast on BBC Radio 4 in 2022 and was about marginalised figures in British history.

Her 2024 Edinburgh Fringe show Haunted House won the Terrier Award at the inaugural Besties awards by Skinny and Fest magazine.

Morton's first book, Life Lessons From Historical Women, was published in 2024.

In December 2024, she started working on a podcast with comedian and author Alasdair Beckett-King entitled Eleanor & Alasdair Read That in which the two red-headed hosts discuss classic children's literature through a modern viewpoint. The official blurb asks "Will our childhood treasures stand the test of time? Or will we be forced to make fun of them on a podcast?" The pilot episode dealt (favourably) with J. R. R. Tolkien's The Hobbit.

== Stand up shows ==
- Lollipop (2014)
- Allotted Mucking Around Time (2015)
- Happy Birthday Katie Lewis! (2016)
- Angry Young Woman (2017)
- Great Title, Glamorous Photo (2018)
- Post-Morton (2019)
- Eleanor Morton Has Peaked (2022)
- Haunted House (2024)
- The Mermaid (2026)
