= Jonathan Oldfield =

English comedian

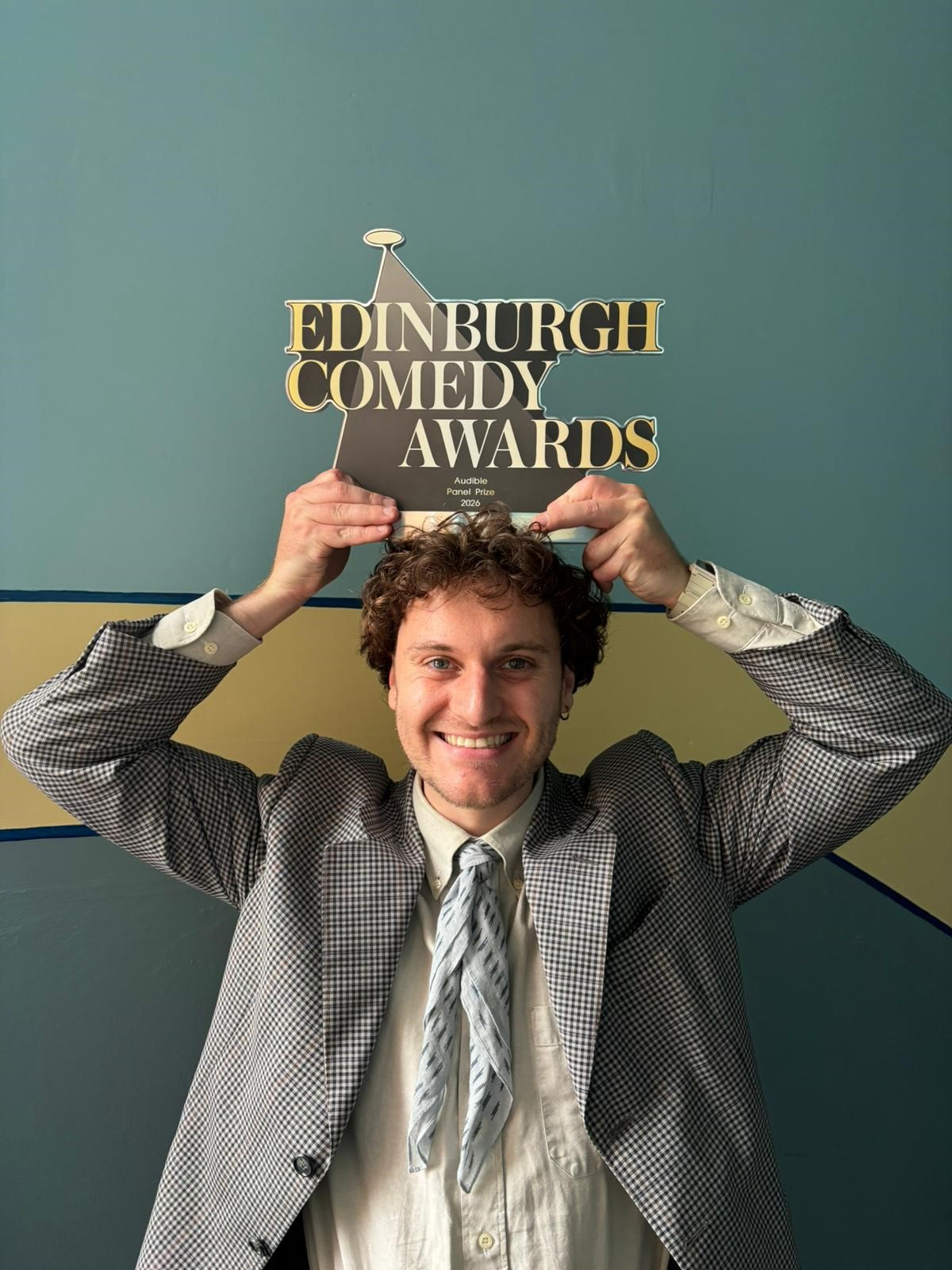
- Oldfield with his 2026 Edinburgh Comedy Awards Panel Prize
- Born: 23 July 1994 (age 32)
- Education: University of Edinburgh
- Occupations: Actor, Comedian, Director
- Awards: Full List
- Website: www.jonathanoldfield.co.uk

Jonathan Oldfield (born 23 July 1994) is an English actor, comedian and theatre director.

== Early life ==
Oldfield grew up in different countries across South America, Asia and Europe before moving back to the UK. He has broken his arm 7 times.

== Career ==
Oldfield studied at the University of Edinburgh.

At the 2023 Edinburgh Festival Fringe, Oldfield directed long time collaborator Lorna Rose Treen in her debut character comedy show Skin Pigeon.

In January 2024, the BBC announced that Oldfield alongside co-writer Lorna Rose Treen had been commissioned by BBC Radio 4 for Time of the Week, a comedy show which parodied women's current affairs and talk shows. Time of the Week premiered 6 June 2024 as a four-episode series and won the British Comedy Guide's Best Radio Sketch Show in February 2025. In November 2024, the BBC announced Time of the Week was recommissioned and it returned for series two in 2025.

In 2024, Oldfield was a finalist in the BBC New Comedy Award. Also in 2024, at the Edinburgh Festival Fringe, Oldfield directed Joe Kent-Walters's debut show Frankie Monroe: LIVE!!. This show won Kent-Walters the Edinburgh Comedy Awards Newcomer prize.

In 2025, he played Attendant Joydali in two episodes of Star Wars: Andor. Also in 2025, at the Edinburgh Festival Fringe, he performed in Kanpur: 1857, a play in which a storyteller faces public execution for joining an uprising against India's colonial rulers. This show won a Scotsman Fringe First award.

At the 2026 Edinburgh Festival Fringe, Oldfield performed his comedy show Jonathan Oldfield: Exquisite Corpse and compered One Joke, a new event asking “how many comedians can tell one joke each, in an hour?". With the latter, he won the Edinburgh Comedy Awards Panel Prize alongside producers Liebenspiel (Benjamin Alborough and Ellie BW) and headliner Lorna Rose Treen.

== Awards and nominations ==
Year	Award	Category	Result	Ref.
2024	BBC New Comedy Award		Finalist	
2026	Edinburgh Comedy Awards	Panel Prize	Won	
2026	NextUp Comedy Biggest Award in Comedy		Nominated	
