= Tony Law =

Canadian stand-up comedian (born 1969)

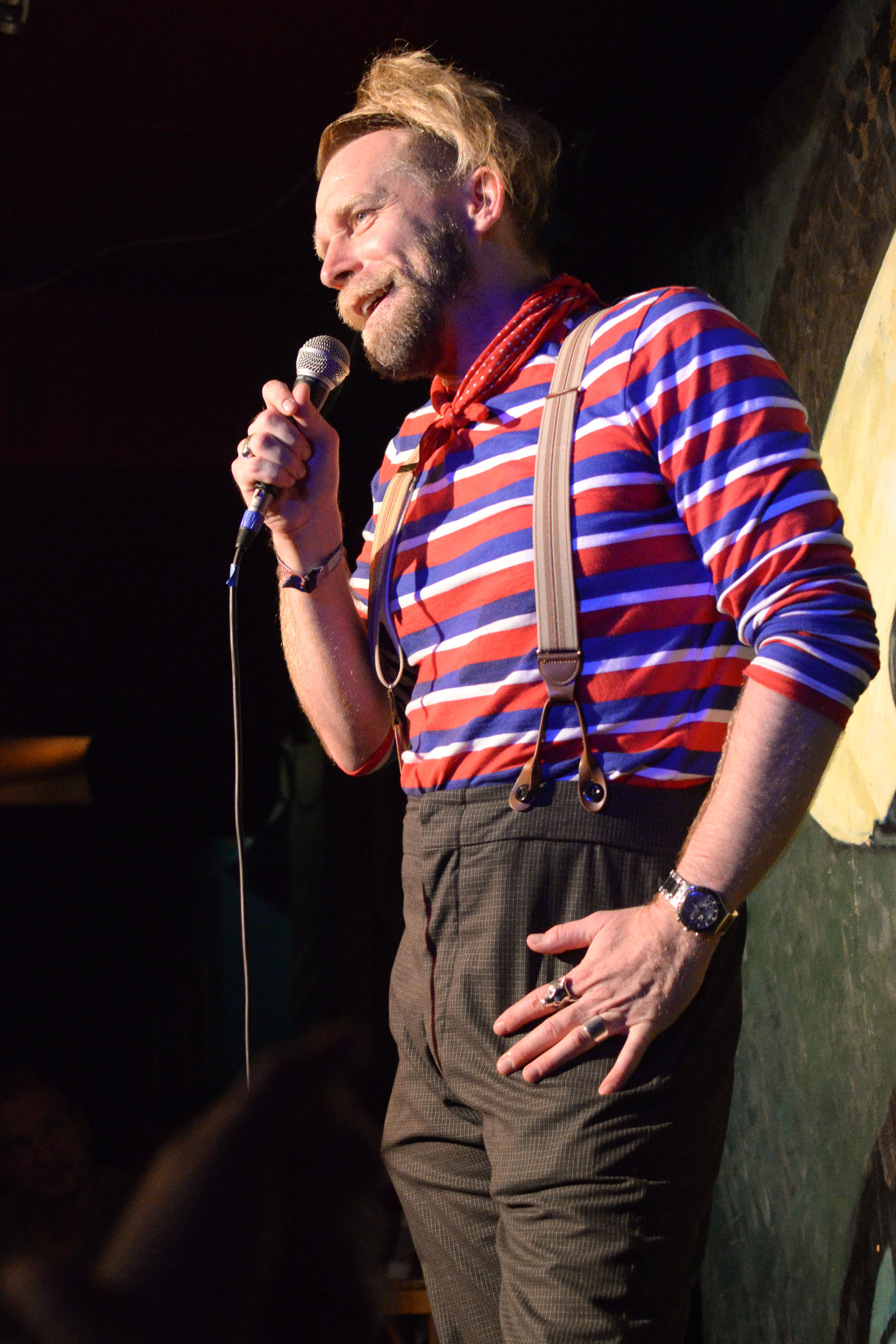
- Law in 2012
- Born: 20 September 1969 (age 57); Lacombe, Alberta, Canada
- Spouse: Storm Davison

Comedy career
- Years active: 2002-present
- Medium: Television, Stand-up
- Genres: Observational comedy, Surreal humour
- Subjects: Current events, Human interaction, history

Tony Law (born 20 September 1969) is a Canadian stand-up comedian. Originally from Lacombe, Alberta, he has been based in London, United Kingdom since the age of 19.

He is known for his surreal material and delivery. Many of his stand-up routines are ad-libbed, and built around various subjects that he has thought of, but not planned a routine about, and often involve fictional and surreal situations.

Having struggled with alcoholism for years, Law gave up alcohol in 2015.

== Early life ==
Law was born on 20 September 1969 in Lacombe, Alberta, Canada. He described his younger self as a "dickhead". Law has said he moved to Britain due to his love of Monty Python and The Who.

== Career ==
Law's comedy career began with him winning the New Act competition at Glastonbury Festival in 1995.

A lot of Law's earlier material featured tales of his time-travelling exploits in the company of his sausage dog, Cartridge Davison. Cartridge is the eponymous "Dog Of Time" from his Edinburgh show of the same name, and has appeared with Law on ITV's Comedy Cuts TV show.

In 2002 he was a regular panellist on the Channel 4 comedy quiz show Does Doug Know?. He also appeared in a series of television adverts for Gala Bingo and has had TV exposure on Edinburgh & Beyond and Comedy Cuts. Law's first comedy tour was in 2009 and in 2010 he was a support act for Stewart Lee.

Law performed on Russell Howard's Good News in April 2011 as part of one of the extended episodes called Russell Howard's Good News Extra. On 17 October 2011, he also appeared on the satirical music-based panel game Never Mind the Buzzcocks.

In 2011–2012, Law toured his comedy show Tony Law: Go Mr Tony Go!. In August 2012, he returned to the Edinburgh Fringe to perform his new show, Tony Law: Maximum Nonsense. The show was nominated for best comedy show at the Edinburgh Comedy Awards.

He appeared on the BBC One show Have I Got News for You, a satire panel show, on 2 November 2012, hosted by Jeremy Clarkson. In November 2012 he appeared on 8 Out of 10 Cats, and returned to that show on 8 February 2013. In February–March 2013 he appeared in Comedy Central UK's The Alternative Comedy Experience.

Law has performed in podcasts including Do the Right Thing and Why Is Your Bottom So Dirty. He also has his own podcast series The Tony Law Tapes.

In 2017 Law worked with Adam Larter to create an experimental comedy opera on ice at the Alexandra Palace called 'Battle for Icetopia' The show won the Chortle Award for Event of the Year.

== Solo shows ==
- 2006 - The Dog of Time
- 2007 - Revenge of the Dog of Time
- 2010 - Mr Tony's Brainporium
- 2011 - Go Mr Tony Go!
- 2012 - Maximum Nonsense
- 2013 - Nonsense Overdrive
- 2014 - Enter the Tonezone
- 2015 - Frillemorphesis
- 2016 - A Law Undo His-elf What Welcome
- 2017 - Absurdity for the Common People
- 2018 - A Lost Show
- 2019 - Identifies
- 2022 - A Now Begin in Again

== Other shows ==
- 2019 - Virtue Chamber Echo Bravo with Phil Nichol
- 2020 - Virtue Chamber Echo Bravo Deep Inside The Internet, a live improvised chat stream with Phil Nichol
- 2021 - The Tone Zone, a solo live streaming broadcast with Kai Barron
