= Tipping Point (game show) =

British television quiz show

- Genre: Game show
- Created by: Hugh Rycroft; Matthew Boulby
- Presented by: Ben Shephard
- Theme music composer: Marc Sylvan
- Country of origin: United Kingdom
- Original language: English
- No. of series: 14 (Regular); 10 (Lucky Stars); 5 (Best Ever Finals)
- No. of episodes: 1,597 (Regular); 93 (Lucky Stars); 11 (Specials); 41 (Best Ever Finals)

Production
- Production locations: The London Studios (Series 1); BBC Television Centre (Series 2); Wimbledon Studios (Series 3–4, 8); Twickenham Film Studios (Series 5–6); Fountain Studios (Series 7); The Bottle Yard Studios (Series 9–14); The Maidstone Studios (Series 15–)
- Running time: ca. 47 minutes (excl. adverts)
- Production company: RDF Television (Series 1–4); Fizz (Series 5–14); Remarkable Entertainment (Series 15–)

Original release
- Network: ITV
- Release: 2 July 2012 – present

Tipping Point is a British quiz show that has been broadcast on the ITV network since 2 July 2012. The programme is presented by Ben Shephard and features three players (four players in Series 1–11) answering questions on the subject of general knowledge in order to win counters which they use on a large coin pusher arcade-style machine in order to win cash and prizes. The show airs repeats on ITV Quiz, U&W, and Really. In South Africa, this programme is also on BBC Brit.

== Gameplay ==
The machine consists of two shelves filled with flat circular counters; the upper shelf slowly extends and retracts, whilst the lower one is stationary. The rear face of the machine is divided into four drop zones, each of which contains a pegboard similar to those found in pachinko machines. Contestants answer questions to win counters, then choose a drop zone and press their buzzer to release one counter at a time into that zone. The goal is to have the counters land flat on the upper shelf so that its retraction will cause the counters to push others over the shelf's front edge, leading them in turn to push still others off the lower shelf and into a collection trough referred to as the "win zone". Contestants win £50 for each counter that drops into the win zone during their turn. Any counters that bounce out of the machine and land on either the floor or the lip of the win zone during a turn are still credited toward that contestant's score.

Only the winner at the end has a chance to take home any money; the others forfeit their accumulated totals.

Three "mystery counters" were introduced in Series 2, each labelled with a question mark. For each mystery counter that enters the win zone, the contestant in control of the machine wins a prize (e.g. monthly flower bouquets, weekend holiday) which is theirs to keep regardless of the game's final outcome. Two "double counters" were introduced in Series 5, each labelled "x2". If one double counter enters the win zone, all counters falling on that same drop are scored for double value (£100 each); if both double counters fall on the same drop, the total is quadrupled (£200 each). As of Series 9, the mystery and double counters are respectively coloured green and yellow to more easily distinguish them from the others in the machine. Typically, the game begins with one counter of each type on the lower shelf and the other ones on the upper shelf.

Counters that enter the win zone when the machine is not in play are "ambient drops" and are removed from the machine with no effect on scoring. If such a drop occurs after a contestant has chosen a drop zone but before they have pressed the buzzer to release a counter, they are given the option to play from that zone or select a different one. Any mystery or double counters that fall into the win zone as an ambient drop are put back in the machine as near as possible to the position they occupied before falling.

A "ghost drop" occurs when a counter drifts forward as it falls through a drop zone and its face makes contact with the clear plastic sheet covering the front of the zone. The resulting friction can greatly slow the counter or even stop its descent altogether for a very short period of time. Ghost drops, mistimed drops and unexpected bounces can lead to a counter landing on the upper shelf so that it partially overlaps or "rides" on others; such plays rarely trigger falls into the win zone and can adversely affect a contestant's turn.

An "edge surfer" occurs when a counter exits through a drop zone and remains on its edge as the shelf moves forward. Whether the counter drops before or on top of the stack of counters on the edge of the drop zone can also affect a contestant's turn.

In Series 1 to 11, with four contestants per episode, the lowest-scoring contestant at the end of each round is eliminated from the game and forfeits all their money. In the event of a tie for low score, a sudden death toss-up is used to break the tie. A correct buzz-in answer allows the contestant to advance while a wrong answer eliminates them. If more than two contestants are tied for low score, the toss-ups continue until either one has been eliminated or all but one have advanced. As of Series 12, with three contestants per episode, eliminations occur only at the end of Rounds 2 and 3.

Contestants who are blind or visually impaired are allowed to have a helper stationed backstage who can see the machine on a monitor and give advice through an audio earpiece as to where and when to play each counter. Contestants who are deaf or hearing impaired are allowed to have an interpreter on stage, who can interpret between spoken words and sign language. However, in both cases, the helper or interpreter may not assist in answering questions or take any other active role in the game.

=== Round 1 ===
Each contestant is given three counters at the outset. The host asks a series of toss-up general knowledge questions and the first contestant to buzz-in may answer. A correct answer allows the contestant to either play one of their own counters or force an opponent to play one instead, based on their judgement of how likely the machine is to pay out on that particular turn. Once a contestant has used all of their counters, they may not answer any more questions. When only one contestant has any counters remaining, they do not need to use their buzzer but must continue answering questions correctly in order to use their counters.

A contestant who gives a wrong answer or no answer at any time loses one counter, which is placed into a penalty pot. If this pot contains any counters by the end of the round, they are put at stake on one final toss-up open to all contestants. A correct answer awards all the counters, while a miss freezes the contestant out for a new question asked to the others. If no contestants miss any questions, the round ends once they have all used the three counters they were given.

=== Round 2 ===
Each contestant answers 45 seconds (30 seconds in Series 1 to 11) of rapid-fire general knowledge questions and receives a counter for each correct answer. Once the time is up, the contestant uses the counters they earned in an attempt to win more money. The contestant in the lead after Round 1 decides who will play first; after the chosen contestant has finished their turn, the higher scoring of the two remaining contestants decides who will play next. In case of a tie at any point, the contestant who first gave a correct answer in Round 1 has priority. At the end of the round, the contestant with the lowest score is eliminated.

=== Round 3 ===
The two remaining contestants are asked six questions; three directed to each contestant alternately. After hearing the question, the contestant in control may either answer or pass to their opponent. A correct answer awards a counter to the contestant giving it, while a wrong answer awards the counter to the opponent. Each counter is used as soon as it is earned. The contestant in the lead after Round 2 decides who will have initial control. If the contestants are tied going into this round, the contestant who was leading at the beginning of Round 2 has priority. After all six questions have been asked, the lower-scoring contestant is eliminated.

=== Final ===
The last remaining contestant is given a jackpot counter (larger than the others used in the game and coloured gold with a red star) and chooses a zone from which to drop it into the machine. The goal of this round is to win a £10,000 jackpot by getting the counter into the win zone. In order to do so, the contestant must earn counters by answering one multiple choice question from each of six categories in any order desired. Questions have three answer options and may be played for one, two or three counters, with higher-value questions being more difficult. The correct answer awards the chosen number of counters, which the contestant immediately plays into the machine.

Counters that enter the win zone during this round are still worth £50 apiece, including any that fall during the initial playing of the jackpot counter, and the mystery and double counters are still in effect. Unlike the main game, ambient drops are added to the contestant's winnings as long as they occur between the initial playing of the jackpot counter and the playing of any counters earned from the last category. If the jackpot counter enters the win zone, the contestant's cash total is augmented to £10,000; as of Series 8, the jackpot is doubled to £20,000 or quadrupled to £40,000 if one or both double counters fall with the jackpot respectively.

If the contestant fails to win the jackpot after using up all six categories, they may either trade the accumulated money for three more counters or end the game at this point and keep all winnings. If the contestant trades, all the regular counters in the machine become worthless and the double/mystery counters only take effect if they fall with the jackpot. If the contestant ends the game and the jackpot counter is on the bottom shelf, they play the three additional counters to see if they would have been able to win the jackpot by trading. Regardless of the contestant's choice or the final outcome, they keep any bonus prizes won from the mystery counters.

== Tipping Point: Lucky Stars and Specials ==
Title card for Lucky Stars.

A celebrity version under the title Tipping Point: Lucky Stars where celebrities are playing on behalf of a selected charity. In the celebrity version, each episode (except ones filmed during the COVID-19 pandemic and the Soccer Aid Specials) has a live audience. The episodes are broadcast in a primetime slot.

The celebrity episodes feature some changes to the ordinary format:

1. All cash values are doubled, therefore normal and mystery counters are worth £100 and the jackpot is £20,000 (except for the Soccer Aid Specials).
2. There are no double counters in the machine (except for the Soccer Aid Specials).
3. Mystery counters award either a joke prize (e.g. a Tipping Point–themed T-shirt, a Tipping Point–themed backpack), a cash bonus or a question relevant to the contestant in control that allows them to play one bonus counter by giving the correct answer. In the Soccer Aid Specials, the prizes are donations to help people in need and the counters have the Soccer Aid logo on them instead of the question mark.
4. The time limit in Round 2 is 30 seconds (except for the Soccer Aid Specials).
5. The contestants who do not make it to the Final still take home the money they have accumulated for their chosen charities and a donation is still made to any contestant who is eliminated without accumulating any money.
6. In the Final, if the contestant takes the trade at the end but fails, their charity still receives £1,000.

== Tipping Point: Best Ever Finals ==
Tipping Point: Best Ever Finals is a half hour spin-off that is shown at times when the Regular or Lucky Stars episodes are neither first broadcast nor repeated (e.g. during ITV Horse Racing coverage). The programme showcases the best and most dramatic finales from previous episodes of Regular Tipping Point and as of Series 2, they also included some dramatic finales from previous episodes of the primetime celebrity spin-off Tipping Point: Lucky Stars.

== Transmissions ==
=== Regular ===
Series	Start date	End date	Recorded	Episodes	Notes
1	2 July 2012	27 July 2012	2012	20	Debuted as one of the summer replacements of The Chase with the other being Don't Blow the Inheritance.
2	2 January 2013	26 February 2013	2012	40	First series to feature the mystery counters.
3	20 May 2013	20 November 2013	2013	70	
4	17 February 2014	29 August 2014	2013	70	
5	5 January 2015	4 December 2015	2014	125	First series to feature the double counters.
6	7 December 2015	21 October 2016	2015	149	
7	2 January 2017	10 November 2017	2016	150	
8	8 January 2018	17 May 2019	2017	165	First series where the double counters double the jackpot as well as the last series to feature the black mystery and double counters.
9	1 January 2019	9 December 2020	2018	165	First series to feature the respective green and yellow mystery and double counters.
10	1 January 2020	12 March 2021	2019	165	This series contained the show's 1,000th episode.
11	19 April 2021	1 June 2022	2020	165	This series had 18 episodes filmed shortly before the first COVID-19 lockdown regulations took place. After lockdown, the filming production resumed behind closed doors with COVID-19 safety measures in place (including social for the host and contestants), which involved the other 147 episodes using a new setup (10 May 2021 was the start date for the "new setup" episodes). Last series to feature four contestants and to use the 30-second time limit in Round 2.
12	11 April 2022	29 May 2026	2021	164	First series to feature three contestants and to use the 45-second time limit in Round 2. This series still used COVID-19 safety measures.
13	17 April 2023	TBD	2022	99	
14	9 September 2024	TBD	2023	99	
15	TBD	TBD	2025	69	
16	TBD	TBD	2026	69	

=== Lucky Stars ===
Series	Start date	End date	Episodes	Notes
1	9 June 2013	25 August 2013	12	
2	5 July 2014	23 August 2014	8	
3	15 October 2016	3 December 2016	8	
4	3 September 2017	29 October 2017	8	Last series to feature the black mystery counters.
5	7 July 2019	22 September 2019	11	First series to feature the green mystery counters.
6	13 September 2020	29 November 2020	12	
7	4 April 2021	16 May 2021	7	This series was filmed behind closed doors with COVID-19 safety measures in place (including social distancing for the host and contestants).
8	3 April 2022	24 July 2022	9	This series still used COVID-19 safety measures.
9	16 July 2023	10 November 2024	9	
10	8 September 2024	1 January 2026	9	

=== Specials ===
Title	First broadcast	Notes
2014 Text Santa Special	19 December 2014	
2015 Text Santa Special	18 December 2015	Also Series 6, Episode 10
2018 Christmas Special	29 December 2018	
2019 Christmas Special	25 December 2019	
2020 Christmas Special	24 December 2020	This episode was filmed with COVID-19 safety measures in place (including social distancing for the host and contestants and no audience).
2021 Soccer Aid Special	2 September 2021	This episode still used COVID-19 safety measures. Contestants: Chris Hughes, Charley Boorman and Ali Hamidi (Also Series 12, Episode 165)
2021 Christmas Special	24 December 2021	This episode still used COVID-19 safety measures. Contestants: Bobby Norris, Scarlett Moffatt and Anton Du Beke
2022 Soccer Aid Special	9 June 2022	Contestants: Lee Juggurnauth, Liv Cooke and Jeff Brazier (Also Series 13, Episode 100)
2022 Christmas Special	17 December 2022	Contestants: Mr Motivator, Josie Gibson and Len Goodman
2023 Soccer Aid Special	8 June 2023	Contestants: Brian McFadden, Maisie Adam and Sam Matterface (Also Series 14, Episode 100)
2023 Christmas Special	26 December 2023	
2026 Soccer Aid Special	28 May 2026	Contestants: Bobby Brazier, Kéllé Bryan and Suzy Eddie Izzard (Also Series 15, Episode 70)

=== Best Ever Finals ===
Series	Start date	End date	Episodes	Notes
1	12 March 2019	17 November 2019	5	
2	10 March 2020	14 June 2021	12	First series to show finales from Lucky Stars.
3	15 March 2022	29 August 2022	8	
4	14 March 2023	15 March 2024	8	
5	16 November 2024	16 May 2025	8	
6	30 September 2026	2 December 2026	10	First series to broadcast at a later time than usually after the ITV Horse Racing coverage due to repeats of Deal or No Deal in the 4pm slot instead of repeats of the main regular Tipping Point series.

== International transmissions ==
- Australia – the Nine Network first broadcast the original British version on 2 December 2019, replacing its 3:00 pm news bulletin, Nine News Now, which went on hiatus during the Australian summer non-ratings period. Episodes air at 3:00 pm Mondays–Thursdays in direct competition with rival ITV-produced game show The Chase on the Seven Network; its Lucky Stars counterpart airs on Fridays in the same timeslot. A repeat of the same day's episode is shown sometime after midnight the following day. For a brief period in January 2021, episodes also aired in prime time, at 7:30 pm Saturdays. In April 2023, it was announced that a localised Australian version, produced by Endemol Shine Australia was in the early planning stages, and would be filmed on the UK set. On 10 August 2023, it was announced that Nine would be ending Millionaire Hot Seat in 2024 and would replace it with a local version of Tipping Point to be filmed in Melbourne and hosted by Todd Woodbridge.
- (Republic of Ireland) Ireland – Virgin Media Two airs episodes of the original British version Monday to Friday at 4:00pm and 5:00pm.
- New Zealand – TVNZ 1 airs episodes of the original British version as well as its celebrity Lucky Stars counterpart Monday to Saturday at 10:00am and Monday to Friday at 3:00pm.

== International versions ==
Legend:

- Currently airing Upcoming or returning version

Country	Local name	Network	Presenter	Each counter worth	Double counter worth	Jackpot	Double Jackpot	Number of Mystery counters	Airdate
Australia	Tipping Point Australia	Nine Network	Todd Woodbridge	$100 ($300 in special edition)	$200 ($600 in special edition)	$20,000 ($40,000 to $100,000 for Jackpot Temptation)	$40,000 ($80,000 to $200,000 for Jackpot Temptation)	2	24 December 2023 (sneak peek); 29 January 2024 – present
Cyprus	Tipping Point	Alpha TV Cyprus	Tasos Tryfonos	€20	€40	€10,000	€20,000	3	10 September 2023 – present
Malta	Tipping Point Malta	TVM	Keith Demicoli	€10	€20	€1,000	€2,000	2	5 January 2026 – present
New Zealand	Celebrity Tipping Point NZ	TVNZ1	Daniel Faitaua	$50	$100	$10,000	$20,000	3	1 June 2026 – present

== Merchandise ==
The official Tipping Point app for iOS was released by Barnstorm Games on 30 March 2014. The Android version was later released on 3 April 2014. An electronic board game based on the show was released in 2015 by John Adams under its Ideal Games brand. Another Tipping Point app was released in 2020 called Tipping Point Blast!
