= Lorna Rose Treen =

English comedian

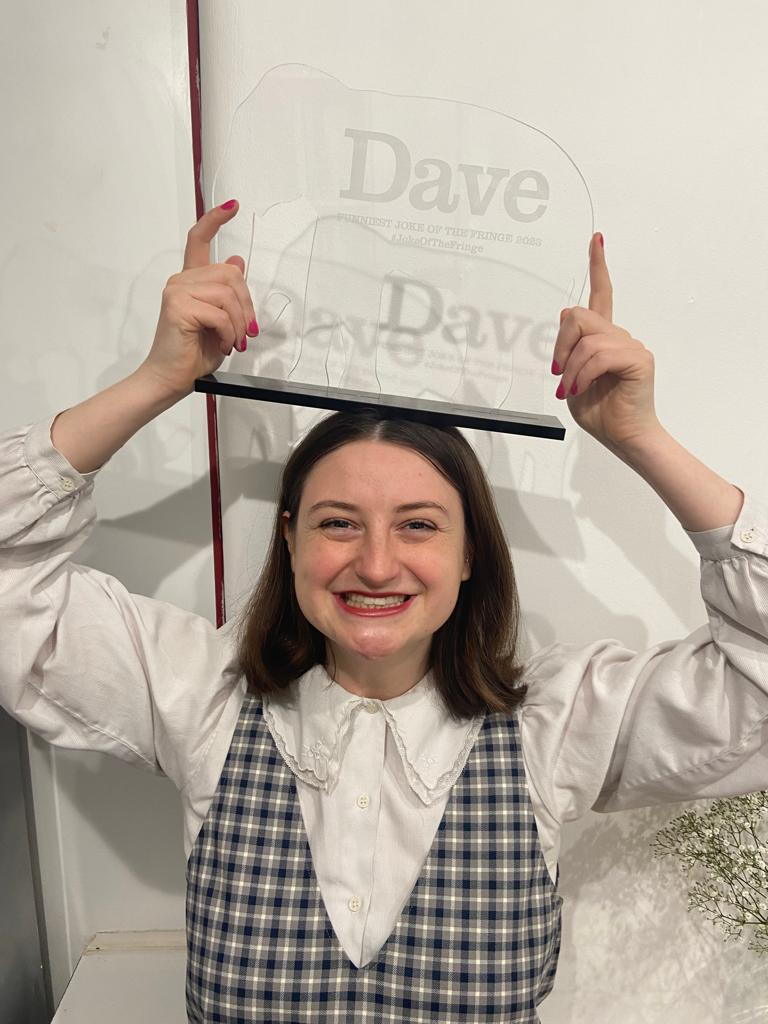
- Treen with her 2023 Funniest Joke of the Fringe award
- Born: 10 October 1994 (age 32)
- Education: University of Edinburgh; École Philippe Gaulier
- Occupation: Comedian
- Awards: Full List
- Website: www.lornarosetreen.co.uk

Lorna Rose Treen (born 10 October 1994) is an English comedian and satirist.

== Early life ==
Treen grew up in Redditch before moving to Edinburgh to study philosophy at the University of Edinburgh. Her mother was a prison governor and her father worked in TV as a tech engineer.

== Career ==
Treen at the 2026 Edinburgh Festival Fringe

Treen began performing improvisational comedy while studying at Edinburgh, joining the student group The Improverts. After completing her studies, she worked in journalism but found "she missed being out of her comfort zone" and moved to France to study comedy under master clown Philippe Gaulier at École Philippe Gaulier.

In 2022, Treen won both the Funny Women Stage Award and Comedy Shorts Award. In 2023, she won Chortle's Best Newcomer Award and was a finalist in the inaugural Sean Lock Comedy Award. At the 2023 Edinburgh Festival Fringe, she performed her debut character comedy show Skin Pigeon. With this show, she won the Funniest Joke of the Fringe.

In January 2024, the BBC announced that Treen alongside co-writer Jonathan Oldfield had been commissioned by BBC Radio 4 for Time of the Week, a comedy show which parodied women's current affairs and talk shows. Time of the Week premiered 6 June 2024 as a four-episode series and won the British Comedy Guide's Best Radio Sketch Show in February 2025. In November 2024, the BBC announced Time of the Week was recommissioned and it returned for series two in 2025.

In March 2024, she won Chortle’s Sketch, Variety or Improv Award.

Treen features in several episodes of No Rolls Barred, a YouTube channel about board gaming, as a guest participant.

In March 2026, it was announced that Treen was part of the inaugural writing team for Saturday Night Live UK.

Treen performed at the 2026 Edinburgh Festival Fringe, where she headlined One Joke, a new event asking “how many comedians can tell one joke each, in an hour?". With this show, she won the Edinburgh Comedy Awards Panel Prize alongside producers Liebenspiel (Benjamin Alborough and Ellie BW) and compere Jonathan Oldfield. In the same year, Treen announced her first UK tour with Now That's What I Call Characters which was postponed due to the second series of Saturday Night Live UK.

== Personal life ==
Treen's partner is actor/director Jonathan Oldfield, who directed Skin Pigeon. Treen has dyslexia.

== Awards and nominations ==
Year	Award	Category	Result	Ref.
2022	Funny Women Awards	Stage Award	Won	
2022	Funny Women Awards	Shorts Award	Won	
2023	Chortle Awards 2023	Best Newcomer	Won	
2023	Sean Lock Comedy Award		Nominated	
2023	Dave's Funniest Joke of the Fringe		Won	
2024	Chortle Awards 2024	Best Sketch, Variety or Improv Award	Won	
2026	Edinburgh Comedy Awards	Panel Prize	Won	
