= Sanderson Jones =

British stand-up comedian, broadcaster and social entrepreneur

- Born: 1981 (age 44–45)
- Occupations: Comedian; Broadcaster; Social entrepreneur
- Years active: 2008–present
- Organization: Sunday Assembly
- Website: sandersonjones.co

Sanderson Jones (born 1981) is a British stand-up comedian, broadcaster and social entrepreneur based in London. He co-founded Sunday Assembly, a worldwide movement of non-religious congregations, with Pippa Evans in 2013. Jones was nominated for Malcolm Hardee Awards in 2011 and for Chortle Awards in 2012.

== Biography ==
Jones was born in 1981 in London. He started his professional comedy career in 2008. He is known for his conceptual performances, with the Skinny saying "Sanderson creates genres at the same rate other comedians write shows". Between 2009 and 2011, Jones also worked as a film critic for The Lady, Britain's longest-running weekly women's magazine.

In 2010, Jones performed for the first time at the Edinburgh Festival Fringe. His show Taking Liberties challenged the legal definition of art and received positive reviews from several newspapers including The Guardian. In April 2011, Jones took his show Taking Liberties to Melbourne International Comedy Festival where it received favourable reviews from The Age and The Sydney Morning Herald.

In August 2011, Jones created the show Comedy Sale where every single ticket was sold in person. The show had a sold-out run and was one of the best-reviewed shows of the 2011 Edinburgh Festival Fringe. In every show of Comedy Sale, Jones would research the audience and include their social media into the performance. In October 2011, the show went to the Union Chapel, Islington where it played to 700 people, who he had all met previously. The show was nominated for a Malcolm Hardee Awards in 2011, and for a Chortle Award in 2012. In 2012, Jones took Comedy Sale to Australia where he played shows at the Adelaide Town Hall, The National Theatre, and the Sydney Opera House. In January 2013, he was a part of Mark Watson's 24 Hour Comedy Show for Comic Relief and broke the world record for the world's longest hug.

In 2013, Jones co-founded Sunday Assembly with Pippa Evans. Sunday Assembly is a non-religious gathering headquartered in London, England. Sunday Assembly has been widely studied and spread rapidly with The Daily Beast calling it "the world's fastest growing church". In 2015 researchers from Oxford University and Brunel University completed a 6-month longitudinal survey of Sunday Assembly participants, and found that attending was correlated to improved wellbeing in a significant way. For his work on Sunday Assembly, Jones was elected to the Ashoka Fellowship which recognises leading social entrepreneurs with solutions to social problems who seek to make large-scale changes to society. He has also received awards and recognition from Nesta and UnLtd.

In 2018 Jones left Sunday Assembly to develop the practice of Lifefulness, a secular and scientific approach that adapts the best parts of spiritual communities.

In September 2018, Jones wrote and presented Meet The Unbelievers & A History of Unbelief, a three-part series that investigated how unbelievers create meaning and belonging. The show was produced by Dan Snow's History Hit and funded by Understanding Unbelief, the world's largest study of atheists and agnostics. In May 2020, Jones contributed to two BBC World Service programmes on community and prayer.

== See also ==
- Sunday Assembly
