= John Kearns =

English comedian (born 1987)

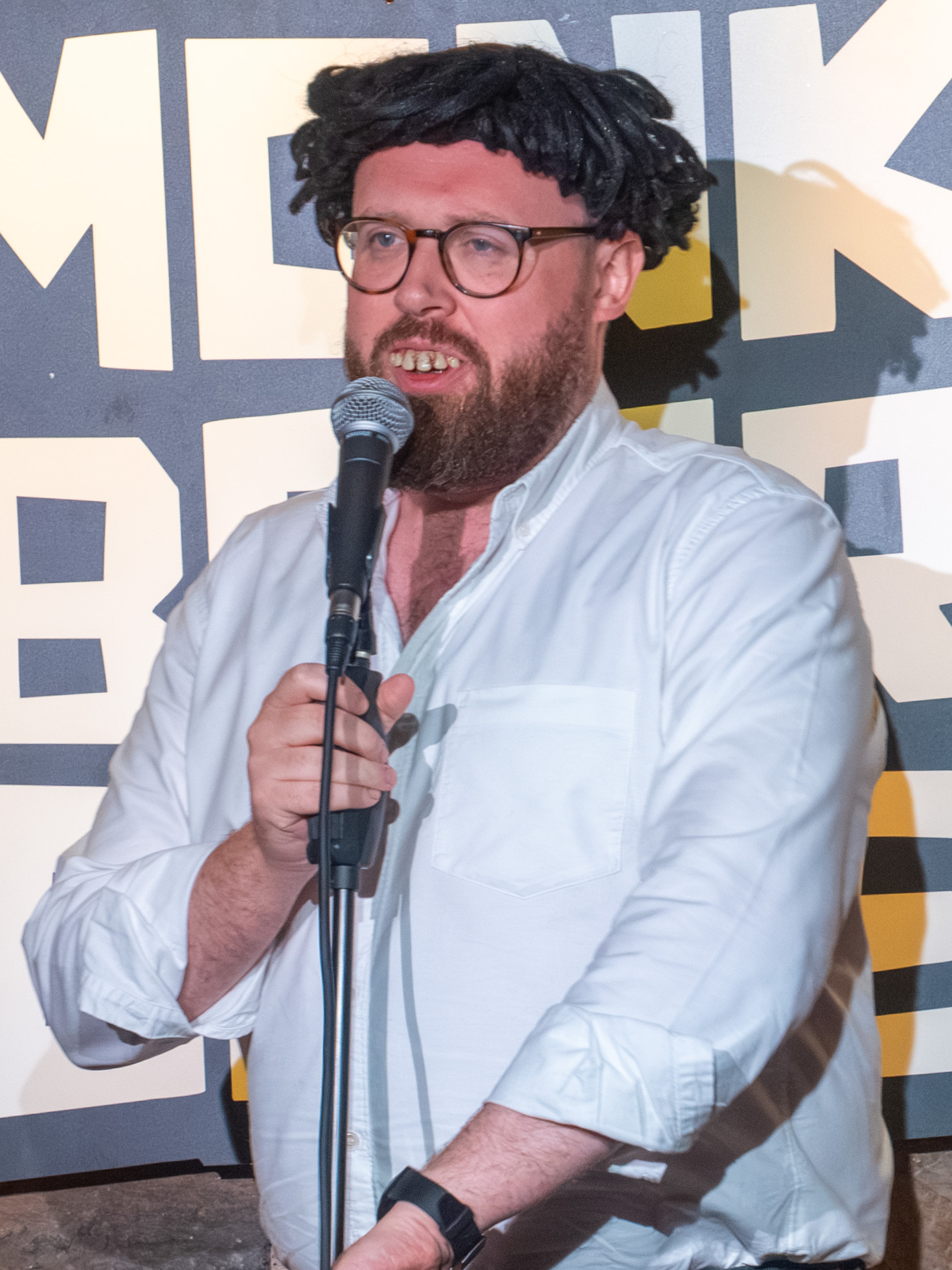
- Kearns performing at the 2025 Edinburgh Festival Fringe
- Born: 10 April 1987 (age 39); Tooting, London, England
- Education: University of East Anglia (BA)

Comedy career
- Medium: Stand-up comedy
- Website: johnkearnscomedy.co.uk

John Kearns (born 10 April 1987) is an English comedian and actor.

Kearns was awarded the Best Newcomer Award at the Edinburgh Comedy Awards in 2013, followed by the Foster's Edinburgh comedy award for Best Show in 2014, making him the first and only comedian to have won both awards in consecutive years. The wins are also notable for the fact both shows appeared on PBH's Free Fringe, making his 2013 win the first ever for a free show. In 2014, Kearns was nominated for three Chortle Awards, and in 2014 and 2015 he was nominated for the Melbourne Barry Award.

== Early life ==
Kearns was born in St Thomas' Hospital. Having grown up in Tooting, London, Kearns was educated at the London Oratory School and the University of East Anglia. At university, he lived with fellow comedian Pat Cahill and radio DJ Greg James. In 2006, while at the university, he performed at Tom Moran's Laugh Out Loud comedy nights with fellow student comedians Cahill, Jon Brittain and Joz Norris. Kearns, Cahill, and Norris returned to the university as part of its 50th anniversary celebrations in September 2013.

With Cahill, Kearns performed in the 2011 Edinburgh Fringe show Dinner Party (produced by Fringe stalwart Harry Deansway) and again at the 2012 Edinburgh Fringe as part of the Pleasance Reserve, taking the lead role of Peter in the Weirdos Comedy Club reproduction of Hook in December 2012.

From 2010 until 2013, Kearns worked as a tour guide at the Houses of Parliament. He also previously worked at the Natural History Museum and the Science Museum.

== Career ==
=== Sight Gags for Perverts ===
Taking its name from a list that film director Stanley Kubrick kept of titles in search of a script, the show was apparently written while on a solitary visit to Berlin, with the trip itself providing a narrative backbone. This, his first solo hour-long show, was directed by his friend, playwright Jon Brittain, and made its debut at Leicester Comedy Festival in February 2013, receiving positive notices. The show was performed again at the Machynlleth Comedy Festival in May to a sold-out crowd. Kearns then took the show to the Edinburgh Fringe in August 2013. Performing as part of PBH's Free Fringe, the show was very well received, culminating in a five-star review from Chortle's Steve Bennett and a nomination as Best Newcomer in the Fosters Comedy Awards, which he won on 24 August 2013.

=== Shtick ===
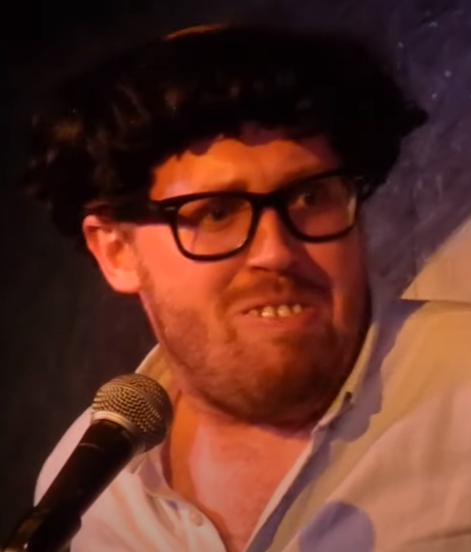
Kearns in 2013

Kearns' follow-up, appearing at the Leicester Comedy Festival as No More Mr. Niche Guy, later becoming Shtick, acknowledged the impact of his previous show's success on himself and his career. Directed again by Brittain and returning to the same venue that had hosted his 2013 Edinburgh Festival Fringe run, The Voodoo Rooms, the show saw positive reactions from audiences and press, as well as another Foster's Comedy Awards win for Best Show. This win made Kearns the first and only act to ever win Best Newcomer and Best Show in consecutive years.

=== Television ===
In 2015, Kearns starred in BBC Three's Top Coppers alongside Steen Raskopoulos.

Kearns has performed on multiple episodes of panel shows 8 Out of 10 Cats Does Countdown and Richard Osman's House of Games, and he was also a contestant on the fourteenth series of Taskmaster. From 2020 to 2023 he was the assistant host of Comedy Central panel show Guessable?, which ran for four series.

== Personal life ==
Kearns lives in London with his partner and son.
