= Pat Cahill =

British comedian

- Born: England

Pat Cahill is a British comedian and Chortle Best Newcomer winner 2012.

== Early life ==
Cahill is from Isleham, Cambridgeshire. He was educated at the University of East Anglia. He began performing in 2009. At university he lived with fellow comedian John Kearns and radio DJ Greg James.

== Career ==
He wrote and performed two podcasts for BBC Radio, Chick N Mix and Doggy Dilemma in 2012 as well as performing on BBC Three's Chris Moyles' Comedy Empire. Cahill also took The Tim and Pat Show to Edinburgh Festival Fringe in 2012. He returned to the fringe in 2013 with his show Start.

Cahill received the Chortle Best Newcomer 2012 award and New Act of the Year (Hackney Empire Awards); he was a Latitude New Act of Year Finalist and BBC Radio 2's BBC New Comedy Act of the Year Finalist.
