= Adam Larter =

British comedian and founder of Weirdos Comedy Club

Adam Larter is a British alternative comedian and founder of Weirdos Comedy Club.

Larter is most often associated with Weirdos but he is also a solo performer whose work is noted for its "lunacy" and uncompromising anarchy that often defies description. He has completed several solo shows at the Edinburgh Fringe as well as Plumpy Nut, a show he wrote and performed with fellow Weirdo Ali Brice which was described as 'an obscure rags to riches story about a pig'.

Adam "Laughter" Larter set up Weirdos in 2010 as a reaction to the mainstream comedy he was seeing whilst performing on the UK circuit. As part of Weirdos, as well as curating its nights, he does a lot of writing and directing. He co-wrote and directed their 2013 alternative Christmas panto The Colonel with Matthew Highton which featured amongst the Independent's 2013 must-sees for Christmas. Adam is a co-founder of webuyanybra.com. In 2014 he wrote their next Christmas panto A Christmas Tail.

In 2014 Larter wrote and directed Computer Boy, a comedy play about a boy who wished he was a computer.
