= The Bugle =

Satirical news podcast

- Logo of The Bugle podcast
- Genre: News; Comedy
- Language: English

Creative team
- Created by: John Oliver; Andy Zaltzman

Cast and voices
- Hosted by: Andy Zaltzman

Music
- Opening theme: "Tide of Empire" (George Chase)

Publication
- No. of episodes: 723
- Original release: 14 October 2007

Reception
- Ratings: 4.6/5

Related
- Website: www.thebuglepodcast.com

The Bugle is a satirical news podcast, created by John Oliver and Andy Zaltzman in 2007. Since 2016, it has been hosted by Zaltzman and a rotating cast of co-hosts including Alice Fraser, Nish Kumar, Anuvab Pal, Hari Kondabolu, Tom Ballard, Tiff Stevenson and Helen Zaltzman. It focuses on global news stories, especially about politics in the United Kingdom, United States and India.

Oliver and Zaltzman co-hosted the podcast from 2007 to 2015, and Zaltzman has hosted it with a rotating set of co-hosts since a relaunch in September 2016. The podcast was initially produced independently and distributed by TimesOnline before becoming independent in 2011. It was part of Radiotopia from 2016 to 2018, when it switched to independent production funded by a voluntary subscription model. As of April 2015, the podcast had received over 500,000 downloads a month.

== History ==
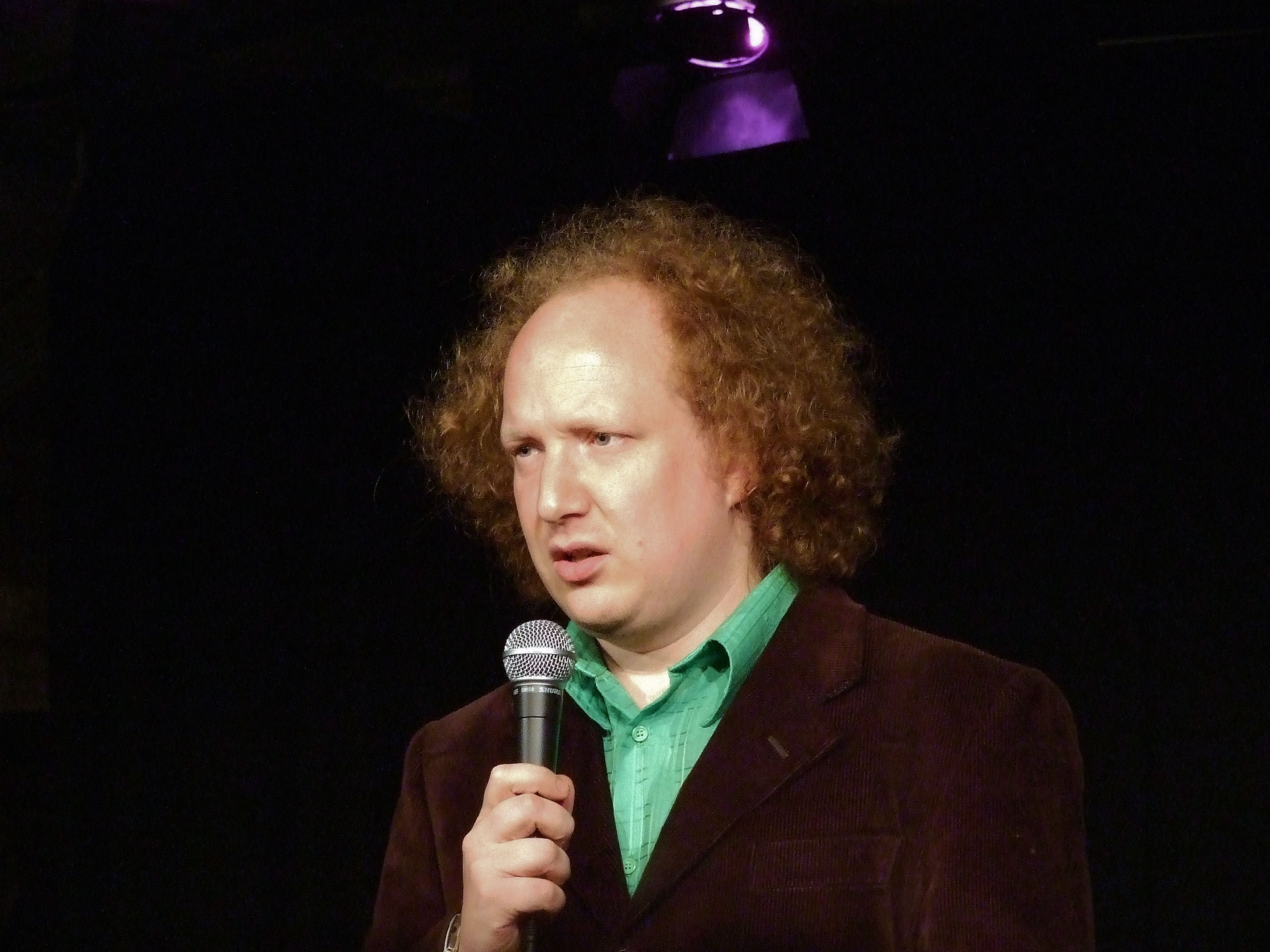
Andy Zaltzman at the Edinburgh Fringe Festival, 2007

John Oliver and Andy Zaltzman had previously partnered for satirical comedy radio programmes Political Animal and The Department. Shortly after Oliver's move to New York to work on The Daily Show, the two were approached by The Times to do a satirical podcast. The first episode of The Bugle was released on 14 October 2007. New episodes of the podcast were generally recorded and published on Fridays with related material appearing on its official website.

At its launch, The Bugle was distributed by TimesOnline, which is owned by Rupert Murdoch's News International. During the News International phone hacking scandal of 2011, The Bugle satirised its parent company in a manner which the New York Times characterised as "blistering" in an article published 15 August. Over the course of a few weekly episodes prior to the New York Times' article, Zaltzman and Oliver had gone "straight for the jugular" regarding News International, its newspapers, and Murdoch himself. Their barbs included a comment that The News of the World "would not be missed at all", as well as the assertion by Oliver—in response to the shaving cream pie attack on Murdoch—that despite the humour inherent in the attack, "[you] just don't want to find yourself with any misplaced sympathy for Rupert Murdoch." The comedians jokingly marvelled with one another that no one in News International had yet shut down their podcast, with Oliver tapping his microphone and asking, "Should this not have been stopped by now? It doesn’t make sense!" In response to the report from the New York Times, in an episode of The Bugle released 19 August, Oliver gave this opening monologue:

"Welcome to any first-time Buglers who are here because they might have read The New York Times' story on us earlier this week...but now that the story's in a newspaper that I'm guessing [Murdoch] reads cover to cover every day, I'm thinking there's an even smaller chance of us managing to not get fired now. So thanks very much, New York Times! Your trumpeting of this podcast may well turn into bugling the Last Post. I guess what I'm saying is—to our new listeners—'Hello and goodbye!'"

On 14 December 2011, it was announced on the podcast that Times Online would no longer be hosting and distributing The Bugle. Producer Chris Skinner stated the reason for cancellation was financial, rather than due to criticism of Murdoch. Zaltzman noted that the never-broadcast pilot approved by News Corp executives in 2007 featured criticism of Murdoch.

The first episode of the newly independent Bugle was published on 20 January 2012 and the podcast was funded by donations and merchandise purchases by listeners from October 2012 to mid-2016.

In the summer of 2014 The Bugle was put on hiatus so that Oliver could focus on his then-forthcoming television show Last Week Tonight with John Oliver with weekly Bugle publication having resumed in October. From summer 2015 to June 2016 episodes were published intermittently when the hosts' work schedules permitted.

On 3 June 2016, it was announced that Oliver would be leaving The Bugle as a permanent co-host, no longer able to regularly host due to family and work commitments. The "fourth season" of The Bugle would continue to be hosted by Andy Zaltzman with various international guest hosts filling in for Oliver. The show was officially re-launched on 24 October 2016, supported by the Radiotopia podcast network. Producer Chris Skinner remained on the show along with Zaltzman, and the first set of new co-hosts were Wyatt Cenac (US), Hari Kondabolu (US), Nish Kumar (UK), Anuvab Pal (India) and Helen Zaltzman (UK). All except Cenac continued to appear on the show regularly through to 2020. Other co-hosts continue to be added to the roster, with some, including Tom Ballard (Australia) and Tiff Stevenson (UK) becoming long-term contributors. Alice Fraser (Australia), introduced in Bugle 4024, has become the most frequent presenter introduced since Oliver's departure, and was the creator and full time host of its first spin off The Last Post, which ran for more than 300 episodes in 2020.

The Bugle left Radiotopia in 2019 and is now funded through voluntary subscription. As a reward for donations, Zaltzman runs a Lies about Our Subscribers service, where he puts each donor's name to an unlikely fact. These are read in a list at the close of episodes.

== Guest co-hosts ==
Since the 2016 relaunch, the show's most frequent co-hosts have been Alice Fraser, Nish Kumar, Anuvab Pal, Hari Kondabolu, Tiff Stevenson and Nato Green. Other regularly recurring co-hosts are Tom Ballard, Josh Gondelman and Helen Zaltzman.

Other co-hosts to have appeared more than once include Chris Addison, Wyatt Cenac, Neil Delamere, Alex Edelman, Matt Forde, Jena Friedman, Lloyd Langford, Josie Long, Aditi Mittal, Al Murray, James Nokise, David O'Doherty, Sami Shah, Mark Steel, Baratunde Thurston and Felicity Ward.

John Oliver has co-hosted three times since the 2016 relaunch, including in episode 4100 and most recently, episode 4325.

== Live shows ==
A live recording of The Bugle Podcast at the Edinburgh Festival Fringe in 2018. Andy Zaltzman, Alice Fraser, and Alex Edelman are performing on stage.

In 2017, the show began to add live shows, performed in front of an audience. Starting at the Melbourne Comedy Festival, followed by dates in London and Edinburgh, the live shows feature Zaltzman with regular co-hosts and Producer Chris. The show is similar in nature to the podcast, with added visuals, a listener Q&A and live audience-only content. These shows also are available in the podcasts feed for all listeners.

== Producers ==
During the first several episodes of the show various "producers" are mentioned by name on air though none of them featured in the show's content.

Tom Wright, known solely on The Bugle as "Tom the Producer", was the producer of the show from episodes 1 to episode 107. He is first heard in Episode 21a, providing continuity to various out-takes from the first twenty episodes. Wright emigrated to Australia in 2010, and returned as a producer for the season 4 episodes recorded in Australia (4023, 4024, 4025).

Wright was replaced by Chris Skinner, who had previously worked with Zaltzman on the Yes, It's the Ashes radio show on BBC Radio 5 Live in 2009. In 2019 Skinner launched his own podcast, titled 'Richie Firth: Travel Hacker, with Absolute Radio's Richie Firth, which featured a cameo from Bugle co-host Alice Fraser.

Ped Hunter has subbed for Skinner when the latter is ill or on holiday. In 2020, Hunter was one of the producers of spin off series The Last Post.

== Offshoots ==
- The Bugle Website – Created in January 2012, the site contains updates on new shows, funding information, notes from the producer and technical information. A site with the same URL had existed previously as an unofficial site.
- @hellobuglers, a Twitter account. Although it began as a complement to The Bugle, primarily publishing one-liner political jokes, it also serves as Andy Zaltzman's own Twitter feed. For example, Zaltzman has used it to announce his guest appearances on other programs.
- @ProducerChris, a Twitter account from show producer Chris Skinner, providing news and updates.
- In 2020, The Bugle launched a daily show titled The Last Post, a short form podcast "set in a parallel universe" and hosted by regular Bugle co-host Alice Fraser. Featuring Andy Zaltzman, Chris Skinner alongside other Bugle regulars (including John Oliver as the voiceover) the show has expanded on The Bugle universe, bringing in emerging talent including Alison Spittle, Charlie George and John Luke Roberts. In November 2020 Fraser confirmed on Bugle 4173 and on social channels that the series would come to an end upon completing a full year, to be replaced with a new show.
- In 2021, a second Alice Fraser spin off show, titled The Gargle launched. This weekly show was billed as 'the glossy magazine to The Bugle's Audio Newspaper'. The show follows a similar format to The Bugle (with crossover guests from both The Bugle and The Last Post), with a focus on non-political news.
- The Bugle has also produced two Tiffany Stevenson series'; Tiny Revolutions, and Catharsis, which launched as part of The Bugle's 15th anniversary, in October 2022.
- To mark The Bugle's 15th anniversary, Top Stories, a new daily, short form podcast series was launched, featuring clips from classic episodes over the 15 years of the show's history.
- Zaltzman and Fraser appeared in the 2020 videogame Watch Dogs: Legion as hosts of in-game fictional podcast The Bug, styled after The Bugle, that aims to "analyse the latest blowflies to emerge from the corpse of a once-free Britain".
- In 2025, a third Alice Fraser spin off show, titled Realms Unknown launched. This weekly show is hosted by Alice Fraser, joined by a guest. They discuss “Fantasy, Sci Fi and speculative fiction, observed through the comedic lens of The Bugle”.

== Reception ==
The Bugle has received many positive mentions in the media. A review by American blog Frozen Toothpaste described the podcast in a 2007 review as "a usually delightful, witty and deadpan satire". Computing website Philosophical Geek praised The Bugle for its unique wit, saying that the reviewer found himself "laughing too hard to concentrate on anything else". The Bugle, according to The Nerd Rage Blog, is "a thing of beauty" and "is quite simply, hilarious". Zaltzman's "bullshit facts" are complimented, as is Oliver's "biting sarcasm". BBC Comedy review show What's So Funny described The Bugle as the benchmark in satire, in an episode dated 27 May 2011.

The podcast has continued to gain positive press coverage in the "Season 4" era, a Financial Times review of its earliest episodes opining that "Anyone wondering if The Bugle would be a damp squib without Oliver needn’t have worried." More recently, there has been particular praise for the show's most frequent guest host Alice Fraser. The Spectator said Fraser "vibes perfectly with Zaltzman’s hyper-articulate and anarchic style", whilst Narc Magazine reviewed her live performance as "captivating, landing her punch lines every time with surreptitious asides into the mic, while Zaltzman whips factual news into delightful, fantastical nonsense, leaving you questioning what was real and what was not."
