= Daniel Kitson =

English comedian, actor, performer and writer

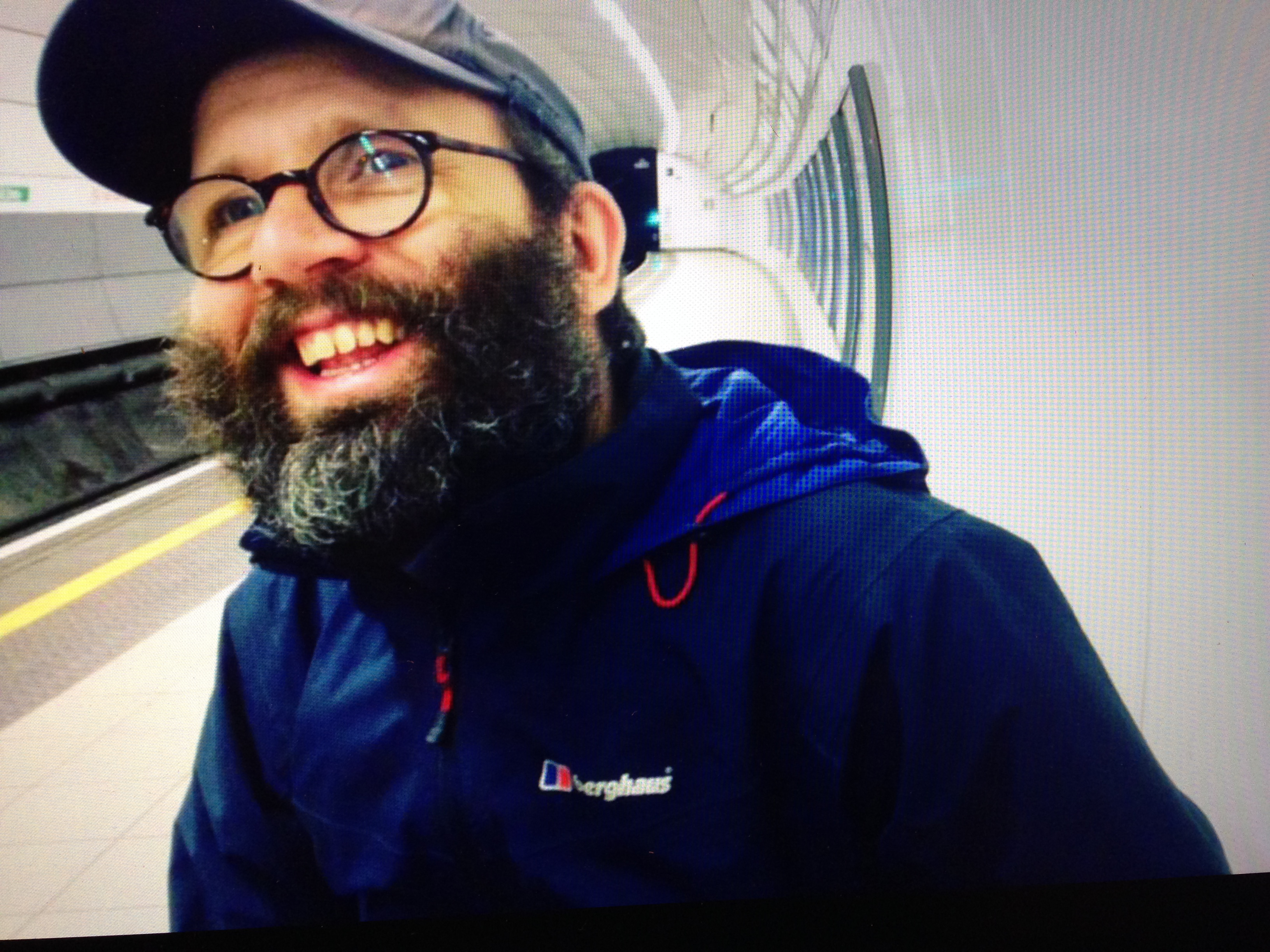
- Kitson in March 2017
- Born: 2 July 1977 (age 49); Denby Dale, Yorkshire, England
- Occupations: Comedian; actor; performer; writer
- Years active: 1993–present
- Website: danielkitson.com

Daniel John Kitson (born 2 July 1977) is an English comedian, actor, performer and writer.

== Early life ==
Daniel John Kitson was born in Denby Dale on 2 July 1977, the son of a primary school headteacher mother and a lecturer father. He was a pupil at Scissett Middle School and Shelley College. He subsequently studied drama at Roehampton Institute, now known as the University of Roehampton.

== Career ==
=== Comedy ===
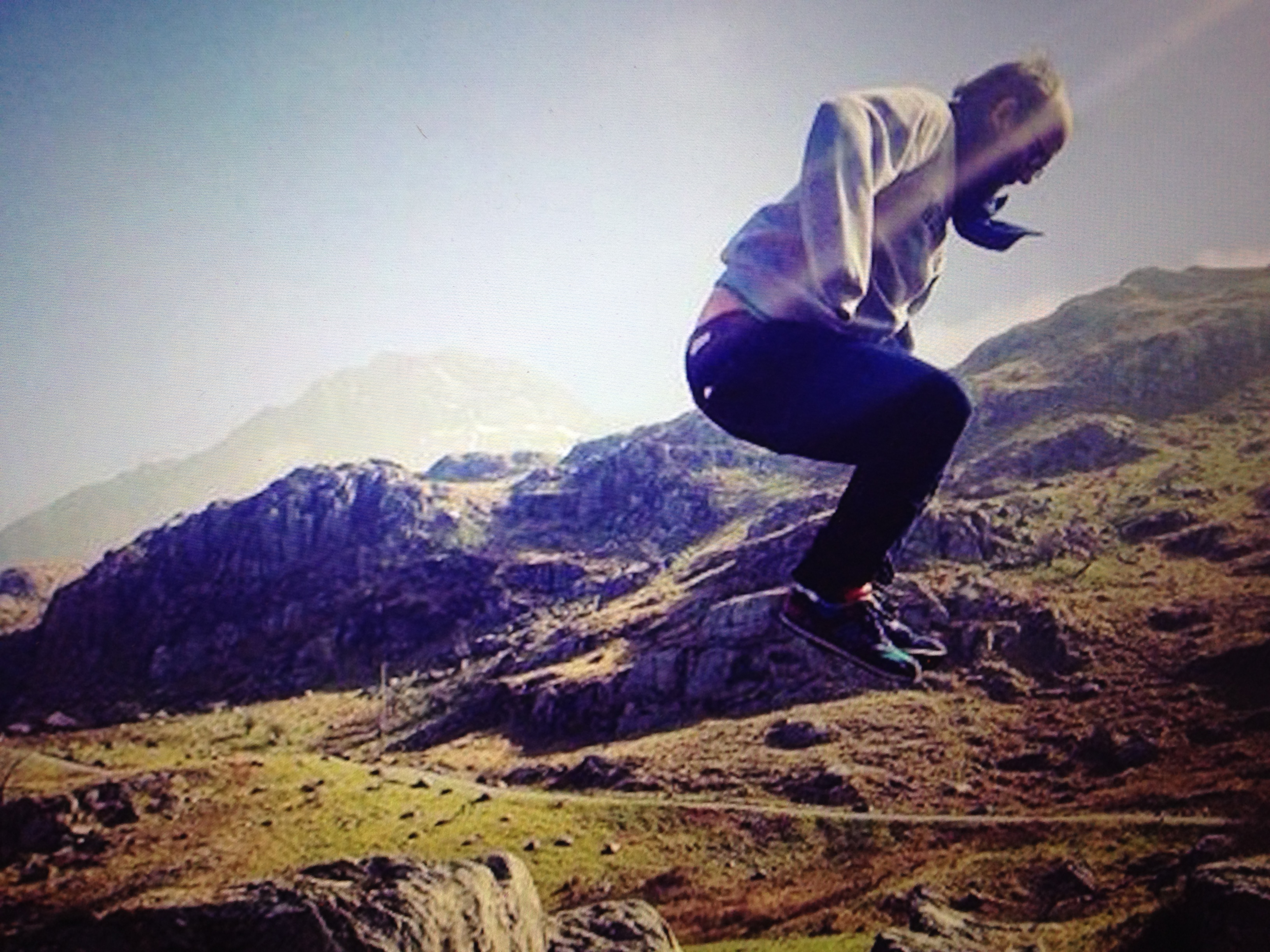
Kitson in March 2017

Kitson began performing comedy at the age of 16. He was nominated for the 2001 Perrier Comedy Award at the Edinburgh Festival Fringe for his show Love, Innocence and the Word Cock before winning it in 2002 for the show Something.

In April 2001, he could be seen at Up The Creek, often alongside Jimmy Carr.

As well as stand up, Kitson has written and performed "story shows". The first was A Made Up Story at the 2003 Edinburgh Festival Fringe, followed by Stories For the Wobbly-Hearted at the Melbourne International Comedy Festival in 2005. The latter show opened at the Traverse Theatre for the 2005 Edinburgh Festival Fringe and won a Scotsman Fringe First Award. In 2006, Kitson took Stories for the Wobbly Hearted to the Brits Off Broadway Festival at 59E59 Theaters in New York. In June 2006, the story show made up one half of his Regents Park Open Air Theatre appearance, where Kitson's stories were accompanied by songs from Gavin Osborn. His story show, C-90, opened at the Traverse for the 2006 Edinburgh Festival Fringe. It was awarded both a Fringe First and The Stage Acting Award for Best Solo Show.

In 2007, Kitson toured It's The Fireworks Talking and the story show C-90 in the UK, Australia, New York and Paris. There was a second Open Air Theatre show in June 2007. Kitson also complemented his Australian tour of C-90 with a loosely structured stand-up show titled At 10 pm, Daniel Kitson Will Be Drinking Tea and Blowing Minds, a reference to a line from the movie Dazed and Confused. It's The Fireworks Talking won Kitson the Barry Award – named after veteran Australian comedian Barry Humphries – at the 2007 Melbourne International Comedy Festival. C90 was awarded an Argus Angel Award at the 2007 Brighton Festival.

In the first half of 2008, Kitson toured his show The Impotent Fury of the Privileged. He played work-in progress gigs in January and early February before presenting the show at 28 dates during May & June. The show was released as an audio download in January 2017.

In July 2008, he began previews of his Edinburgh Festival show, 66A Church Road: A Lament, Made Of Memories And Kept In Suitcases.

In 2009, Kitson performed two new shows: We Are Gathered Here & The Interminable Suicide of Gregory Church, the latter of which was toured in late 2010 and the first half of 2011. Prior to this in early 2010, Kitson also did a short UK tour of 66a Church Road – A Lament Made of Memories and Kept in Suitcases that he initially performed in Edinburgh in 2008 (and then took to Australia.)

In January 2012, his show It’s Always Right Now, Until it’s Later played at the St. Ann's Warehouse in Brooklyn, New York.

In March 2012, Kitson took a brand new stand-up show, Where Once Was Wonder, on a work-in-progress tour around the UK before touring it in Australia and returning for the Edinburgh Fringe in August. The new show comprises all new material and is made up of three stories about "the impossible".

In 2013, he took his new stand-up show entitled After the Beginning. Before the End on a UK tour and also played a few European dates.

Kitson debuted his new play Mouse: The Persistence of an Unlikely Thought at Liverpool Everyman in 2016.

in 2017, Kitson performed his first stand-up comedy in over four years at The Roundhouse in July 2017, before taking it to The Royal Exchange, Manchester. The show, Something Other Than Everything, was largely well-reviewed, though received criticism from a Guardian journalist who objected to an in-context use of the word 'paki'.

In 2019, Kitson performed a run at the Battersea Arts Centre for a show entitled Keep. The premise of this show was to read aloud a catalogued list of 20,000 objects in his home, but in true Kitson style an extra narrative and much humour is delivered along the way.

In 2020, during a period where many UK venues were closed due to the COVID-19 pandemic, Kitson toured a new show Dot. Dot. Dot. to a series of theatres and comedy clubs, performing without a live audience, but streamed to online ticket-holders that were limited to the capacity of the venues. The show consisted of Kitson, sat at a table covered in Post-it Notes and Polaroid photos, holding them up one-by-one as he covered vignettes of personal experiences from the start of the pandemic up until the moment of performance.

In April 2022, Kitson announced a return to the stage after two years. With his new show Outside, he toured outdoor venues in the UK in his first live performances since the start of the pandemic.

=== Film and television ===
Kitson appeared in an episode of That Peter Kay Thing, "The Arena", and as Spencer in Peter Kay's Phoenix Nights. He also played a bus driver in the 2001 film Dog Eat Dog.

In 2007, clips of Kitson's stand-up were shown on the one-off Channel 4 show 100 Greatest Stand-Ups where he came 27th. In an updated version of the poll in 2010, he was voted 23rd. Chris Addison commented that "Kitson is the finest comedian of his generation". Stewart Lee also commented, after seeing a stand-up set by Kitson, that he saw stand-up "about as good as it could get".

Whilst in his teens, he appeared as a contestant on the ITV quiz show Blockbusters.

Kitson voices an "alley rat" in the pilot episode of the Kristen Schaal and Kurt Braunohler comedy Penelope: Princess of Pets which was aired in 2010 by Channel 4.

In late October 2024, Kitson made a guest appearance as himself in Series 18 of Taskmaster, being phoned up by one of the contestants.

=== Radio ===
In 2006, Kitson began presenting his own weekly music-based radio show called The Listening Club. The show, broadcast live 1 am to 4 am on Monday nights / Tuesday mornings from London's community arts radio station Resonance FM, mainly involves music from his own collection (some played directly from his iPod), and occasional clips of comedy. In between tracks he talks about the music, tells anecdotes, and responds to the SMS text messages and e-mails that are sent in throughout the show. There were six shows in the original January–February 2006 run, with further instalments in October 2006 and February 2007. Kitson returned to Resonance FM in early 2013 on Tuesdays from midnight to 2:30 am. The show is only broadcast once with no repeat or accompanying podcast to ensure that audiences hear the show only once to make it more special, he also requests that no one record the show.

The show returned in September 2016 under the title Captain Bang Bang's Magic Castle for a run of five weeks. This run of shows was subject to a number of mishaps which resulted in Kitson only broadcasting for one hour of the fifth show due to missing his train and missing the entire final show due to not being able to enter the Resonance FM radio station. As with the original run the show was not archived or repeated.

In 2018, it was announced that, for three weeks in May, Kitson would host an early morning weekday show on Resonance FM called A Reason To Wake Up. These limited breakfast show runs were repeated in May 2019 and May 2020. In August 2020, Kitson presented "Trifle", which he said he created "because August is an odd month to be in my house". This was broadcast on Resonance FM between midnight and 1.30 GMT. Although it was originally stated that the shows would be available for listening after broadcast, in a change of plan none of these shows were subsequently archived or repeated.

Kitson had originally begun doing radio shows in Australia during the 2005 Melbourne International Comedy Festival, on Melbourne-based community station 3RRR. These continued, twice weekly, in 2006 and 2007. The Australian programmes are usually co-hosted with a comedian friend. Co-hosts have included Courteney Hocking, David O'Doherty, Andrew McClelland and Steve Hall of We Are Klang.

He has appeared on the BBC Radio 4 show Loose Ends.

Kitson appears in Episode 2 of the Flight of the Conchords radio series.

He also can be heard on the BBC Radio 4 programme Tim Key Delves Into Daniil Kharms and That's All.

== Personal life ==
Kitson has a stutter.

== Live shows ==
Year	Venue	Show	Type	Notes
2001	Edinburgh Festival Fringe	Love, Innocence and the Word Cock	Stand-up	
2002	Edinburgh Festival Fringe	Something	Stand-up	Won Perrier Comedy Award
2002	Edinburgh Festival Fringe	Tartan Ribbon Comedy Benefit	Benefit	In aid of Waverley Care
2002	Edinburgh Festival Fringe	The Stonewall Gala	Benefit	In aid of Stonewall
2003	UK Tour	Over-rated and on Tour	Stand-up	
2003	Melbourne International Comedy Festival	Something	Stand-up	
2003	Edinburgh Festival Fringe	A Made Up Story	Story Show	
2003	Edinburgh Festival Fringe	Stand Up for Freedom	Benefit	In aid of Amnesty International
2004	UK Tour	Lover, Thinker, Artist and Prophet	Stand-up	
2004	Edinburgh Festival Fringe	Dancing	Stand-up	
2005	Edinburgh Festival Fringe	Daniel Kitson 11:30 pm at The Stand	Stand-up	
2005	Edinburgh Festival Fringe	Stories for the Wobbly-Hearted	Story Show	Won Scotsman Fringe First Award
2006	UK and Australian tours	Weltanschauung	Stand-up	
2006	Regents Park Open Air Theatre	Weltanschauung	Stand-up	
2006	Regents Park Open Air Theatre	Stories for the Wobbly Hearted	Story show	With Gavin Osborn
2006	Brits Off Broadway Festival	Stories for the Wobbly-Hearted	Story show	
2006	Edinburgh Festival Fringe and UK tour	C-90	Story show	Won Scotsman Fringe First Award and The Stage Acting Award for Best Solo Show
2006	Edinburgh Festival Fringe and UK tour	The Honourable Men of Art	Stand-up	With Andy Zaltzman, Alun Cochrane, Demetri Martin and David O'Doherty
2007	Melbourne International Comedy Festival	It's the Fireworks Talking	Stand-up	Won MICF Barry Award
2007	Regents Park Open Air Theatre	It's the Fireworks Talking	Stand-up	
2007	Regents Park Open Air Theatre	The Ballad of Rodger and Grace	Story Show	With Gavin Osborn
2007	Edinburgh Festival Fringe	It's the Fireworks Talking	Stand-up	
2008	Melbourne International Comedy Festival; Australian and UK tours	The Impotent Fury of the Privileged	Stand-up	
2008	Regents Park Open Air Theatre	The Impotent Fury of the Privileged	Stand-up	
2008	Regents Park Open Air Theatre	The Revenge of Heckmondwyke	Story Show	With Gavin Osborn
2008	Edinburgh Festival Fringe	66a Church Road: A Lament, Made Of Memories And Kept In Suitcases, By Daniel Kitson	Story Show	Won Scotsman Fringe First Award
2008	Edinburgh Festival Fringe	The Honourable Men of Art	Stand-up	With Andy Zaltzman, Alun Cochrane and David O'Doherty
2008	Melbourne International Arts Festival and Australian tour	The Ballad of Roger and Grace	Story Show	with Gavin Osborn
2009	Regents Park Open Air Theatre	Stories for the Starlit Sky	Story Show	Three interlinked stories with music by Gavin Osborn
2009	Edinburgh Festival Fringe	The Interminable Suicide of Gregory Church	Story Show	Won Scotsman Fringe First Award
2009	Edinburgh Festival Fringe	We Are Gathered Here	Stand-up	Plus UK tour
2009	Sydney Opera House	66a Church Road: A Lament, Made of Memories and Kept in Suitcases	Story Show	Showing 24 November – 13 December
2010	UK tour	66a Church Road: A Lament, Made of Memories and Kept in Suitcases	Story Show	
2010	Edinburgh Festival Fringe	It's Always Right Now Until It's Later	Story Show	
2010	Latitude Festival	Stories for the Starlit Sky	Story Show	With Gavin Osborn
2011	St. Ann's Warehouse	The Interminable Suicide of Gregory Church	Story Show	
2011	UK & Australia tour	The Interminable Suicide of Gregory Church	Story Show	
2011	Royal National Theatre	It's Always Right Now, Until it's Later	Story Show	
2012	St. Ann's Warehouse	It's Always Right Now, Until it's Later	Story Show	
2012	Royal Exchange Theatre	It's Always Right Now, Until it's Later	Story Show	
2012	Regents Park Open Air Theatre	Lucinda Ding and the Monstrous Thing	Story Show	With Gavin Osborn
2012	Regents Park Open Air Theatre	Where Once Was Wonder	Stand-up	
2012	Edinburgh Festival Fringe	Where Once Was Wonder	Stand-up	
2012	Edinburgh Festival Fringe	As of 1:52 GMT on Friday 27 April 2012, this show has no title	Story Show	Script-reading
2012	Edinburgh Festival Fringe	ZOCK!!	Stand-up	With Andy Zaltzman, John Oliver, and Alun Cochrane
2012	The Hob at Forest Hill	Fuckstorm3000	Stand-up	With Andy Zaltzman, Alun Cochrane, and Gavin Osborn
2013	Barrow Street Theatre	After the Beginning. Before the End	Stand-up	
2013	UK & Euro tour	After the Beginning. Before the End	Stand-up	
2013	Royal Exchange Theatre	Tree	Play	Featuring Tim Key.
2013	St. Ann's Warehouse	Analog.Ue	Story Show	
2014	Royal National Theatre	Analog.Ue	Story Show	
2014	US Tour	Pretty Good Friends	Stand-up	Tour with Eugene Mirman
2014	Edinburgh Festival Fringe	A Variety of Things in a Room	Story Show	With Gavin Osborn
2014	Edinburgh Festival Fringe	Fuckstorm 3001	Stand-up	With Andy Zaltzman and Alun Cochrane
2014	Battersea Arts Centre	A Show for Christmas	Story Show	
2015	The Old Vic	Tree	Story Show	With Tim Key
2015	Australia & New Zealand Tour	Polyphony	Story Show	
2015	Edinburgh Festival Fringe	Polyphony	Story Show	
2015	UK Tour	Stories For The Starlit Sky	Story Show	With Gavin Osborn
2015	Connelly Theater	A Show for Christmas	Story Show	
2016	Everyman Theatre	Mouse – The Persistence of an Unlikely Thought	Story Show	
2016	Edinburgh Festival Fringe	An Insufficient Number of Undeveloped Ideas Over Ninety Testing Minutes	Stand-up	
2016	Edinburgh Festival Fringe	Mouse – The Persistence of an Unlikely Thought	Story Show	
2016	St. Ann's Warehouse	Mouse – The Persistence of an Unlikely Thought	Story Show	
2017	Battersea Arts Centre	Stories For The Starlit Sky	Story Show	
2017	The Roundhouse	Something Other Than Everything	Stand-up	
2017	Royal Exchange Theatre	Something Other Than Everything	Stand-up	
2017	Studio Theatre	A Short Series of Disagreements Presented Here in Chronological Order.	Story Show	
2018	Edinburgh Festival Fringe	Good For Glue	Stand-up	
2019	Regent's Park Open Air Theatre	Outside. Again.	Story Show	With Gavin Osborn
2019	Grand Theatre, Wolverhampton	Hilarity Charity Gala	Benefit	In aid of Central Youth Theatre
2019	Edinburgh Festival Fringe	Everything Smells Of Orange	Stand-up	
2019	Edinburgh Festival Fringe	Shenanigan	Story Show	
2019	Battersea Arts Centre	Keep	Story Show	
2019	Studio Theatre	Keep	Story Show	
2019	St Ann's Warehouse	Keep	Story Show	
2020	UK Tour	Dot. Dot. Dot.	Story Show	Streamed online to ticket holders
2021	Online Show	Shenaniganagain	Story Show	Streamed online to ticket holders. Released on physical formats Summer 2022 under the name 'Shenanigan'
2022	UK Tour	Outside.	Stand-up	
2022	Shakespeare's Globe	Maybe a Ghost Story.	Story Show	Performed on 26 and 27 October 2022 at Shakespeare's Globe, London
2023	Melbourne International Comedy Festival	I Shall Have a Good Think When Everybody’s Gone Home	Stand-up	
2024	UK Tour	Collaborator	Story Show	
2024	Royal Exchange Theatre	Pith		

== Recordings ==
Kitson has released audio and video recordings of some of his live shows on Bandcamp and Vimeo:

Audio

- The Ballad of Roger and Grace w/ Gavin Osborn (2012)
- Midnight at The Stand (2012)
- Dancing (2012)
- Weltanschauung (2012)
- After the Beginning, Before the End. (2015)
- The Impotent Fury of The Privileged (2017)
- It's The Fireworks Talking (2020)
- We Are Gathered Here (2021)
- Shenanigan (2022) – Vinyl/CD/Cassette only

Video

- It's Always Right Now, Until It's Later. (2018)
- The Interminable Suicide of Gregory Church (2020)
- Stories for the Wobbly Hearted (2020)
- Tree (2023)
- Outside (Upcoming)

(Years are of the recording's release; years of the corresponding live shows are listed in the 'live shows' section.)
