= John Oliver's New York Stand-Up Show =

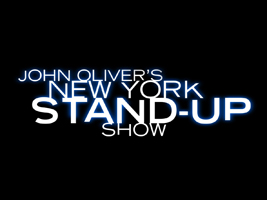
- Genre: Stand-up comedy
- Country of origin: United States
- Original language: English
- No. of seasons: 4
- No. of episodes: 26

Production
- Camera setup: Multi‐camera
- Running time: 42 minutes

Original release
- Network: Comedy Central
- Release: January 8, 2010 – September 13, 2013

John Oliver's New York Stand-Up Show is a stand-up comedy television series that aired on Comedy Central in the United States. Hosted by British-American comedian John Oliver, the show featured new material by both up-and-coming and established comedians. Each episode featured four performers including the headliner, with Oliver usually opening the show with a short set.

== Episodes ==
Season	Episodes	Originally released	
Season	Episodes	First released	Last released
1	6	January 8, 2010	February 12, 2010
2	6	March 25, 2011	April 28, 2011
3	6	July 20, 2012	August 24, 2012
4	8	July 26, 2013	September 13, 2013

=== Season 1 (2010) ===
No. overall	No. in season	Guest performers	Original release date
1	1	Maria Bamford, Nick Kroll (as Fabrice Fabrice), Greg Fitzsimmons & Eugene Mirman	January 8, 2010
2	2	Mary Lynn Rajskub, Hari Kondabolu, Matt Braunger & Brian Posehn	January 15, 2010
3	3	Hannibal Buress, Pete Holmes, Matt McCarthy & Janeane Garofalo	January 22, 2010
4	4	Maria Bamford, Hannibal Buress, Amy Schumer & Marc Maron	January 29, 2010
5	5	Chris Hardwick, Nick Kroll, Matt Braunger & Kristen Schaal	February 5, 2010
6	6	Chris Hardwick, Mary Lynn Rajskub, Greg Fitzsimmons & Paul F. Tompkins	February 12, 2010

=== Season 2 (2011) ===
No. overall	No. in season	Guest performers	Original release date
7	1	Kyle Kinane, Glenn Wool, Rory Scovel & Pete Holmes	March 25, 2011
8	2	Deon Cole, Moshe Kasher, Marina Franklin & Maria Bamford	March 31, 2011
9	3	Anthony Jeselnik, Rory Albanese, Deon Cole, Tommy Johnagin & David Koechner	April 7, 2011
10	4	Mike Lawrence, Marina Franklin, Brendon Walsh & Greg Behrendt	April 14, 2011
11	5	Brendon Walsh, Glenn Wool, Kumail Nanjiani & Kirk Fox	April 21, 2011
12	6	Kumail Nanjiani, Jen Kirkman, Kyle Kinane & Al Madrigal	April 28, 2011

=== Season 3 (2012) ===
No. overall	No. in season	Guest performers	Original release date
13	1	Hari Kondabolu, Mark Normand, Ben Kronberg & Wyatt Cenac	July 20, 2012
14	2	Jared Logan, Adam Newman, Emily Heller & Hannibal Buress	July 27, 2012
15	3	Leo Allen, Al Jackson, Sheng Wang & Marc Maron	August 3, 2012
16	4	Mike Lawrence, Andy Zaltzman, Kurt Braunohler & David O'Doherty	August 10, 2012
17	5	Michael Che, Iliza Shlesinger, Hari Kondabolu & Michael Ian Black	August 17, 2012
18	6	Dan St. Germain, Adam Lowitt, Andy Zaltzman & Dana Gould	August 24, 2012

=== Season 4 (2013) ===
No. overall	No. in season	Guest performers	Original release date
19	1	Nick Turner, Colin Jost & Reggie Watts	July 26, 2013
20	2	Joe Zimmerman, Sara Schaefer & Tom Lennon	August 2, 2013
21	3	James Adomian, Jessi Klein & Pete Holmes	August 9, 2013
22	4	Morgan Murphy Seth Herzog, & Rory Scovel	August 16, 2013
23	5	Phil Hanley, Brooke Van Poppelen & Gary Gulman	August 23, 2013
24	6	Ron Funches, Mark Forward & Dan Soder	August 30, 2013
25	7	Ali Wong, Travon Free & Paul F. Tompkins	September 6, 2013
26	8	Joe Mande, Jamie Lee & W. Kamau Bell	September 13, 2013
