= Waen Shepherd =

Comedy song writer, electronic music composer

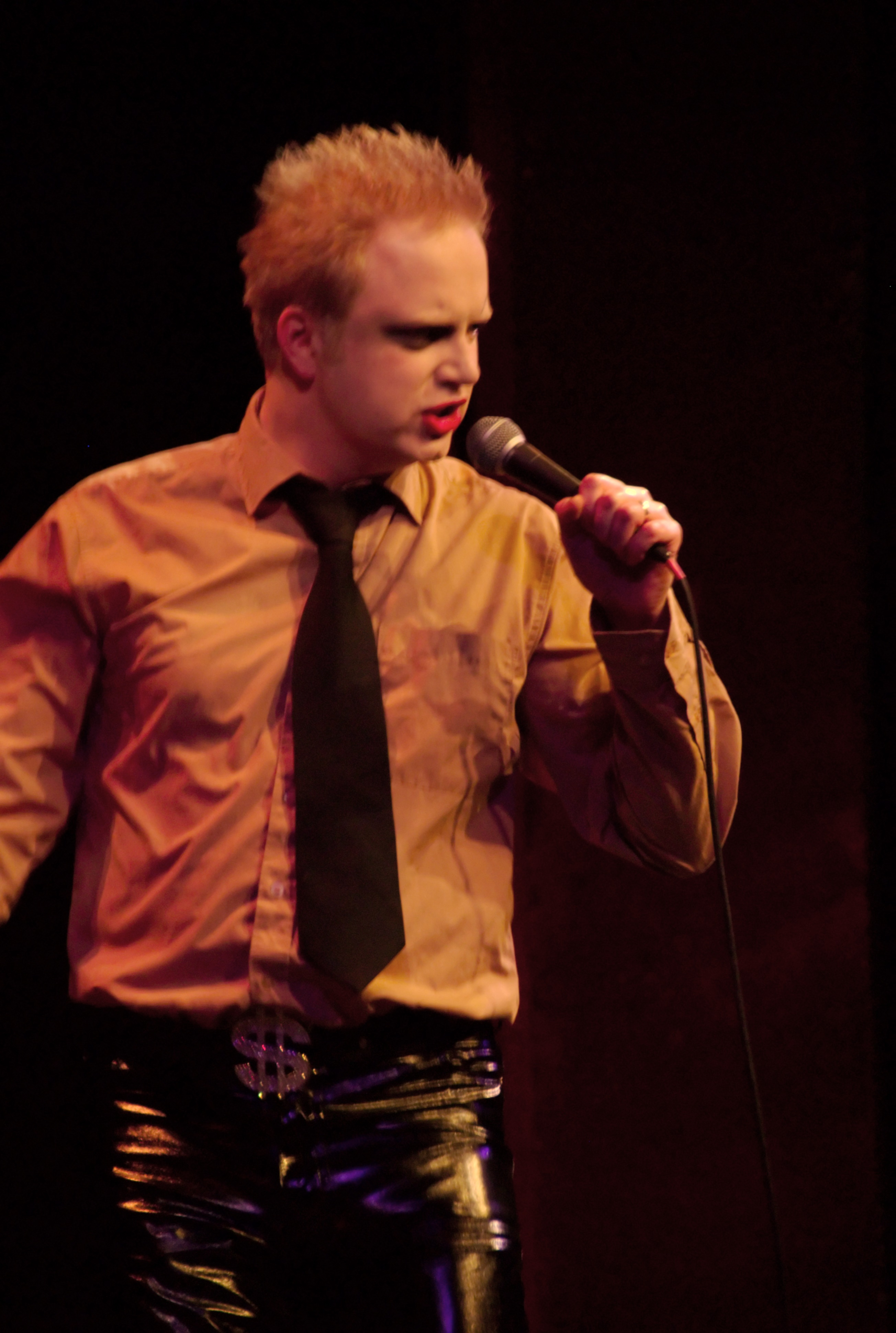
- Waen Shepherd as Gary le Strange
- Born: Waen Origen Shepherd; 23 October 1971 (age 54); Castleford, West Riding of Yorkshire, England
- Occupations: Comic actor, musical/character comedian, writer, electronic music composer
- Years active: 1992–present
- Spouse: Katy Darby

Waen Origen Shepherd (born 23 October 1971) is an English composer, actor and comedian. He is best known for his role in The Inbetweeners as Mr Kennedy. He is originally from Yorkshire, he now lives in London.

== Career ==
Following his days as a stand-up poet and fringe actor, Shepherd started out performing bizarre experimental monologues at the early Cluub Zarathustra, touring with spoof techno band and Edinburgh sell-out The Pod with fellow comedian/musicians Tim Hope and Julian Barratt. He hosted the underground cabaret Gritty Fingers and smashed up Cornish pasties in the guise of ranting Northern madman William Whicker.

He graduated from Oxford University in 1993, with a degree in Philosophy and Psychology.

He went on to co-write and narrate award-winning animation The Wolfman (screened on Channel 4 and subsequently worked into an advertisement for the Sony PlayStation), before writing, directing and starring in his own animation Origen's Wake for Channel 4's Comedy Lab series.

Since then, Shepherd concentrated on developing a number of comedy characters on stage, partly through his work as one half of Shepherd & Farnaby in their shows Animal Pie and Peterford Golf Club, and partly through his solo work on the comedy circuit.

In 2003, Shepherd created a deluded monster in the form of Gary Le Strange, melding his love of composing with that of creating original comedy characters. He went on to win the Perrier Award Best Newcomer (2003) for that debut performance. He achieved cult success, hosting a "Club Le Strange" comedy evening at The Albany in London.

Shepherd enjoys portraying exaggerated or absurd characters, and appeared in two series of BBC2's science fiction comedy, Hyperdrive, as Captain Helix. He has also appeared on BBC Radio 2's Out to Lunch programme.

In 2007, Shepherd appeared in a short film by Tim Plester entitled World of Wrestling, in which he played 'Exotic' Adrian Street, a wrestler with the flamboyance of a drag queen. He also has had two roles in Series 1 of We Are Klang as 'The Juggler' and a Hungarian prince. Shepherd played the role of peadophillic teacher, Mr. Kennedy, in the award-winning second and third series of The Inbetweeners.

Shepherd was cited as one of the Top 50 British comedians by The Times and he is included as one of the Top 50 Cult Comedian Icons in the Rough Guide series of books. Shepherd's dedication to British comedy has been honoured by the inclusion of his name on the famous Comedy Carpet at Blackpool, under the guise of Gary Le Strange.

Shepherd has written several theme tunes and music for television and radio. He is the series composer for Crackanory and Murder in Successville, both produced by Tiger Aspect. He has composed music for several films, including the 2015 feature-film The Ghoul directed by Gareth Tunley.

== Albums ==
- Polaroid Suitcase
- Face Academy
- Glamoronica
- Beef Scarecrow

== TV credits ==
- Action Team – Series 1 (Shinny Button/ITV) – Series Composer
- Murder in Successville – Series 1,2 & 3 (Tiger Aspect/BBC) – Series Composer
- Crackanory – Series 1–4 (Tiger Aspect/UKTV) – Series Composer
- Count Arthur Strong – Series 1 (BBC) – 2013 Victorian Policeman
- The Inbetweeners – Series 2 (Channel 4) – 2009 John "Paedo" Kennedy
- The Inbetweeners – Series 3 (Channel 4) – 2010 John "Paedo" Kennedy
- We Are Klang – 2009 Hungarian Prince
- We Are Klang – 2009 The Juggler
- Hyperdrive Series Two (BBC2) – 2007 Captain Helix
- Comedy Cuts (ITV2 ) – 2007 Gary Le Strange
- World Stands Up (BBC America – 2006
- Hyperdrive Series One – BBC2 – 2006 Captain Helix
- Gary Le Strange (BBC)
- Comedy Lab: Origen's Wake (Channel 4) actor, writer, composer, director
- PS2 "Third place" advert, actor/writer
- The Wolfman (C4) actor/writer
- Comedy Nation (BBC2) actor/writer
- The Net (BBC2)
- London Shouting (BBC2)

== Film credits ==
- The Ghoul (Gareth Tunley, 2017) - composer
- Aaaaaaaah! (Lincoln Studios, 2015)
- The Monster (Bob Pipe, 2015) - composer
- World of Wrestling (Ben Gregor 2007)
- The Incredibly Strange People Show (Powercage Films, 2001)

== Radio credits ==
- 2525 (BBC Radio 4)
- Tittle Tattle (BBC Radio 2)
- Alice's Wunderland (BBC Radio 4)
- Lucy Montgomery's Variety Pack (BBC Radio 2)
- Danny Robins' Music Therapy (BBC Radio 4) - composer
- Play & Record (BBC Radio 7)
- Out to Lunch (BBC Radio 2)
- The Day The Music Died (BBC Radio 2)
- 4 at the Store (BBC Radio 4)
- The End of the Road Show (BBC Radio 4)
