= Gary Le Strange =

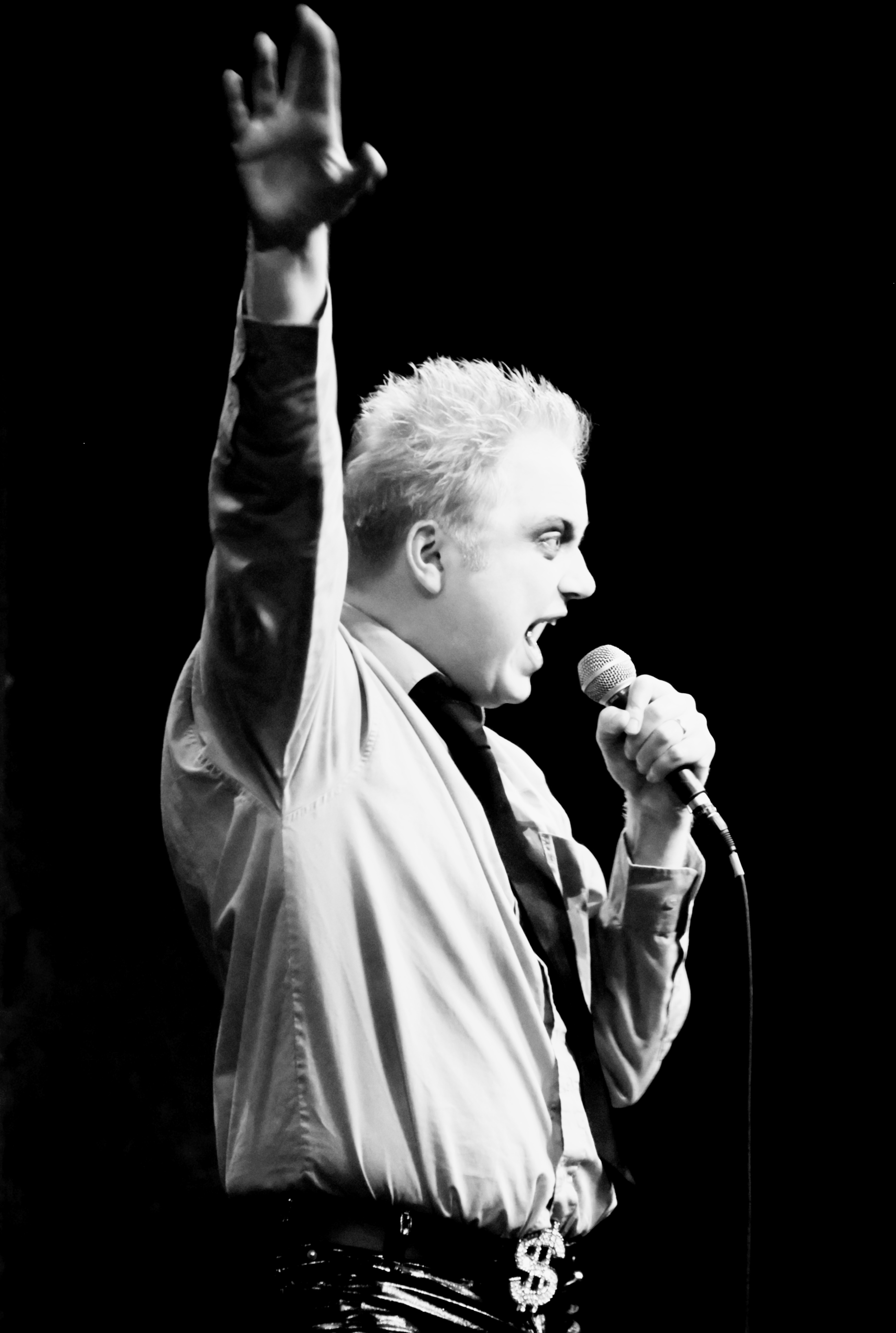
- Gary Le Strange performing live at the Resofit, a benefit event for Resonance FM.
- First appearance: "Polaroid Suitcase"; Edinburgh Festival Fringe; 2003
- Created by: Waen Shepherd
- Portrayed by: Waen Shepherd

In-universe information
- Occupation: Composer, songwriter, performer
- Nationality: English

Gary Le Strange is a character created by comedian Waen Shepherd. Le Strange is played as an eccentric English cult-rock composer, songwriter and performer, who believes his surreal and abstract performances to be groundbreaking.

Le Strange's eclectic style of songs are bombastic, upbeat and quirky, in the new romantic style, and on stage he uses avant-garde performance art between songs. Le Strange appeared at the 2003 Edinburgh Festival Fringe with his debut show Polaroid Suitcase, for which he received a Perrier award for Best Newcomer.

Le Strange continues to perform live, and his most recent album is Beef Scarecrow.

== TV credits ==
- Comedy Cuts, 2007

== Theatre credits ==
- Beef Scarecrow, 2006
- Face Academy, 2004

== Album releases ==
- Polaroid Suitcase
- Face Academy
- Beef Scarecrow
