= Andy Zaltzman =

British comedian and statistician

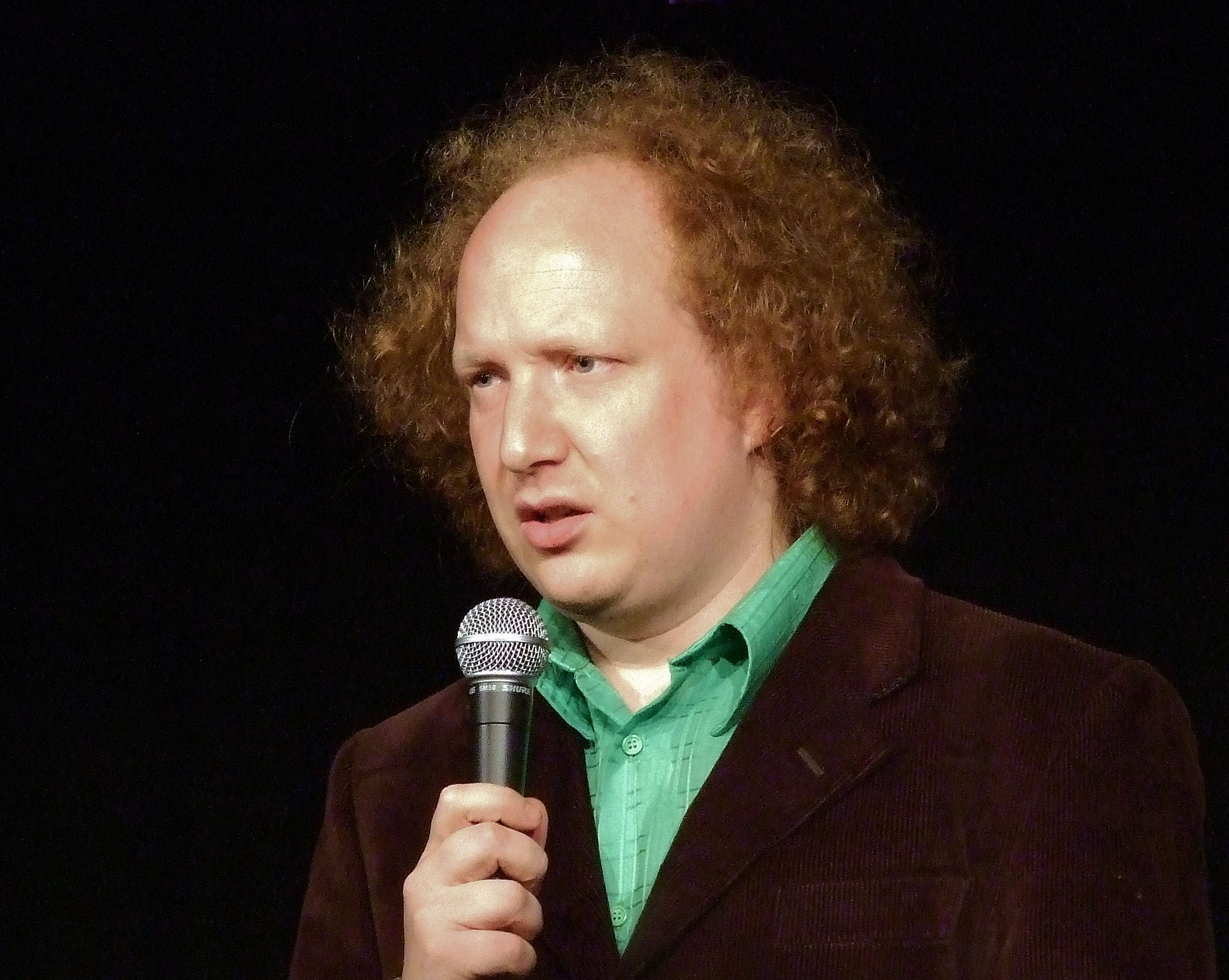
- Zaltzman performing at the 2007 Edinburgh Festival Fringe
- Born: Andrew Zaltzman; London, England
- Education: Holmewood House School; Tonbridge School; University of Oxford
- Notable work: Political Animal; The News Quiz; The Bugle; Test Match Special
- Relatives: Helen Zaltzman (sister)

Comedy career
- Years active: 1999–present
- Medium: Stand-up, radio, podcast
- Genre: Political comedy
- Website: www.andyzaltzman.co.uk

Andrew Zaltzman (born 1974 or 1975) is a British comedian and cricket statistician. His comedy largely deals in topical and sport-related material. He has worked with John Oliver, with their work together including Political Animal, The Department and The Bugle. Since 2016 he has been a cricket statistician for BBC Radio's Test Match Special cricket commentaries, and since 2020 the presenter of Radio 4's The News Quiz. On television, in 2024, he won the eighteenth series of Taskmaster against Babatunde Aléshé, Emma Sidi, Jack Dee and Rosie Jones, famously coining the catch phrase “Nexus of Truth”.

== Early life and education ==
Andrew Zaltzman was born in Hammersmith, west London, of Lithuanian-Jewish ancestry. He is the son of Zechariah "Zack" Zaltzman who was originally from South Africa, a management consultant who became a sculptor. Andy is the elder brother of Helen Zaltzman, of The Allusionist and Answer Me This! podcasts, and has an elder brother called Rick who works in business. Zaltzman mostly grew up in Tunbridge Wells, but for a few years lived next to a cricket field in Fordcombe.

Zaltzman was privately educated, first at Holmewood House School, a prep school in Langton Green, and subsequently Tonbridge School in Kent. He studied classics at the University of Oxford where he was an undergraduate student at University College. He initially wanted to be a sports journalist, and served as sports editor for The Oxford Student.

== Career ==
Zaltzman started his career in stand-up comedy, before moving into broadcasting and writing.

=== Edinburgh Festival Fringe ===
Zaltzman first performed at the Edinburgh Festival Fringe in 1999, when he was a finalist in the prestigious So You Think You're Funny new act competition along with Josie Long, Russell Howard and David O'Doherty.

His debut full-length Edinburgh Fringe show Andy Zaltzman versus the Dog of Doom received a nomination for Best Newcomer at the Perrier Comedy Awards in 2001.

At the 2004 Edinburgh Festival Fringe Zaltzman began – initially with John Oliver – hosting Political Animal, a stand-up show in which different acts perform political-themed material; Zaltzman has hosted solo since 2006. Political Animal later transferred to BBC Radio 4.

=== Other stand-up ===
Zaltzman performed at the Melbourne International Comedy Festival for the first time in April 2007, winning the coveted Piece of Wood Award, given to the best show as voted for by other comedians.

In 2011 Zaltzman appeared as a guest stand-up comic on Russell Howard's Good News Extra. In 2013 he also contributed a review of that year's World Snooker Championship to BBC Television's regular coverage of the event.

Since mid-2014 Zaltzman has toured Satirist for Hire, where questions and comments are solicited from potential or confirmed audiences (usually via email or social media) before performing at venues, giving parts of the show a constantly evolving order and structure. In December 2014, Zaltzman performed at the Lord's Taverners charity Christmas lunch.

=== Radio ===
Zaltzman and John Oliver gained their first big break when they teamed up with Chris Addison on The Department, a short-running radio show based on the premise that Chris, Andy and John, were a three-man organisation brainstorming to solve society's problems. The radio show hosted three series on BBC Radio 4 from January 2004 to September 2006. Zaltzman, Oliver and Addison played characters who were a part of the show's "Research Team 32"; Zaltzman's character was Lazlo Wolfe.

In July 2009 Zaltzman hosted a Saturday morning show on BBC Radio 5 Live entitled Yes, It's The Ashes, taking a comic look at the 2009 Ashes. Zaltzman presented his own four-part BBC Radio 4 programme in December 2009 entitled Andy Zaltzman's History of the Third Millennium, Series 1 of 100. Also featuring Rory Bremner and Bridget Christie, the show contained stand-up and sketches focusing on the last 10 years.

Zaltzman was a regular co-host, along with comedians Al Murray and Rebecca Front, of the satirical news programme 7 Day Sunday (also broadcast as 7 Day Saturday). The show had been running on BBC Radio 5 Live since starting in January 2010. Zaltzman is also an occasional guest on the online cricket radio commentary station Test Match Sofa and on Talksport's cricket show Howzat. More recently he has appeared on Test Match Sofa's successor www.guerillacricket.com and was an occasional member of the team when they broadcast the programme from a central London sports bar for the 2015 Ashes.

He has appeared on The Weekly with Charlie Pickering on ABC Television in Australia since 2015. In 2016 Zaltzman became the Scorer for Test Match Special on BBC Radio 4 on the Sri Lankan tour of England. From 10 June 2016, he hosted Zaltzman's Summer of Sport podcast published by The Guardian. In 2017 he wrote and performed a three-part series on ancient philosophy including Stoicism, Epicureanism and Cynicism for BBC Radio 4. In 2018, along with comedian and occasional The Bugle co-host Anuvab Pal, he wrote and performed in Empire-ical Evidence, a look at the rise and fall of the British Empire produced for BBC Radio 4.

Having hosted one of three series of The News Quiz, sharing duties with Angela Barnes and Nish Kumar in 2020. Zaltzman has been the permanent chair since 2021, with the exception of 2024 where he shared hosting duties with comics including Geoff Norcott due to cricket broadcasting duties.

=== Podcasting ===
Zaltzman has co-hosted The Bugle, a weekly satirical comedy podcast, since 2007.

From October 2007 until June 2016, the podcast was hosted by Zaltzman with John Oliver. In June 2016, Oliver left the show because of other commitments. The show was officially relaunched on 24 October 2016. Producer Chris Skinner remained on the show along with Zaltzman and a rotating group of co-hosts. The first set of new co-hosts included Wyatt Cenac (US), Hari Kondabolu (US), Tiff Stevenson (UK), Nish Kumar (UK), Alice Fraser (Australia), Anuvab Pal (India), Tom Ballard (Australia) and Helen Zaltzman (UK).

The Bugle was hosted by The Times until December 2011 and the podcast has since been independent, relying upon listeners' contributions to continue.

In 2016 the podcast relaunched and became a member of the Radiotopia podcast network. In December 2018 it was announced that The Bugle would be leaving Radiotopia. Zaltzman played the host of The Bug podcast in 2020's Watch Dogs: Legion, alongside his Bugle co-host Alice Fraser. The show is highly satirical and takes direct inspiration from The Bugle in its approach and delivery.

From 17 November 2017, he co-hosted The Urnbelievable Ashes with Felicity Ward, a podcast published by the Australian Broadcasting Corporation.

=== Television ===
On 5 January 2024 Zaltzman was the winner of BBC's Celebrity Mastermind with a specialist subject of Auguste Rodin. In November 2024 Zaltzman won the eighteenth series of Taskmaster, beating Babatunde Aléshé, Emma Sidi, Jack Dee and Rosie Jones. Zaltzman returned to the show for its fourth "Champion of Champions" placing 4th.

=== Writing ===
Zaltzman has worked with Rory Bremner on a number of projects; these include Transatlantic, a US election special for BBC Radio 4, and several series of Bremner, Bird and Fortune. In June 2007, BBC2's The Culture Show commissioned Zaltzman and John Oliver to write a mock farewell speech for departing Prime Minister Tony Blair. The speech was then animated by Triffic Films, with the voice of Blair played by Bremner.

In November 2008 his first book, entitled Does Anything Eat Bankers?: And 53 Other Indispensable Questions for the Credit Crunched, was published.

=== Cricket ===
Zaltzman is a huge fan of cricket and has been since the age of six, when in 1981 his father gave him books about the 1981 Ashes series. In November 2008 he began a regular blog for Cricinfo, named "The Confectionery Stall" after a famous piece of commentary by Richie Benaud, where he described a shot by Ian Botham during his innings at the third Ashes Test Match at Headingley, in 1981 as having "gone straight into the Confectionery Stall and out again". Alongside Jarrod Kimber, he hosts a podcast on cricket known as The Cricket Sadist Hour.

Zaltzman's blog covered the 2011 World Cup for Cricinfo, supported by a number of podcasts.

Zaltzman has also appeared on the internet radio site Guerilla Cricket, and has played for the Authors XI cricket team.

Zaltzman was the statistician on Test Match Special for the three-match Wisden Trophy series between England and West Indies in July 2020 and between England and Pakistan a month later. Whilst travelling to cover England's tour of Pakistan for Test Match Special in October 2024 he travelled with equipment for England wicket keeper Jamie Smith whose wicket keeping pads had not arrived in time for him before travelling.

=== Influences and style ===
Zaltzman says he was "quite a serious child" and even received a note in a school report that he had to "develop a sense of humour". When he was around fourteen or fifteen, he discovered the films and shows of the Monty Python comedy group and also watched The Day Today on television and listened to the radio show On the Hour. Andy mentioned that because of his father's artistic career, "if you wanted to go off and be creative, that was a valid lifestyle choice in his mind. When one of us said, 'Dad, I don't really know what I want to do,' or 'I'm off to make a living from stand-up or something equally stupid' there was really no way our father could turn to us and say, 'No, get a proper job'." His sister also said that his style of job meant that it gave her and her siblings "permission to take creative and financial risks".

When asked about why he chose to focus his comedy on politics he said: "It was the comedy I'd always liked most, before I started doing comedy. Also, I don't have very good observations about life, so if I'd tried to be an observational comedian, I wouldn't have gotten anywhere. My home life was stable. My parents love me. I've got really nothing to talk about. The worst kind of parents from a comedian's point of view."

=== Edinburgh fringe shows ===
Year	Show name	Notes
1999	So You Think You're Funny	New act competition. Finalist
2000	The Comedy Zone	New act showcase
2001	Andy Zaltzman versus the Dog of Doom	Nominated for Best Newcomer at the Perrier Comedy Awards
2002	Andy Zaltzman Unveils the 2002 Catapult of Truth	
2003	Edinburgh and Beyond	Showcase. With John Oliver and Rob Deering
2004	Erm... It's About The World... I Think You'd Better Sit Down	With John Oliver
2005	John Oliver and Andy Zaltzman issue a list of demands and await your response with interest	With John Oliver
2006	Andy Zaltzman Detonates 70 Minutes of Unbridled Afternoon	
2007	Andy Zaltzman, 32, Administers His Emergency Dose of Afternoon Utopia, Steps Back And Waits To See What Happens	
2008	Andy Zaltzman Boldly Unbuttons The Cloak of Civilisation, But Is Perplexed And Perturbed By What He Finds Lurking Beneath	
2010	Andy Zaltzman Swears to Tell the Truth, Half the Truth, and Everything But the Truth	
2011	Andy Zaltzman: Armchair Revolutionary	
2013	Andy Zaltzman: Satirist for Hire	
2014	Andy Zaltzman: Looks At Some Of The News (briefly) And Is Confused By Most Of It	
2016	Andy Zaltzman: Plan Z	
2017	Andy Zaltzman: 2017 – The Certifiable History.	
2018	Right Questions, Wrong Answers.	
2019	Andy Zaltzman: Satirist For Hire – Blindfold Cliff-Edge Unicorn Brexit Britain Bogus Prime Minister Democrageddon American Elections Cricket World Cup General State of the World Specials.	

== Personal life ==
Zaltzman's wife is a barrister and they have two children, a daughter born in January 2007 and a son born in December 2008. Zaltzman delivered his son at home when his wife went into labour suddenly. His sister Helen Zaltzman is a comedian and podcaster. He has played club cricket for Penshurst Park Cricket Club near Tonbridge in Kent.

When asked about his Jewish identity, Zaltzman said he was not "particularly Jewish" and followed up with: "I grew up in Tunbridge Wells, so the nearest synagogue was about 30 miles away. My father was already lapsed. My mother converted to Judaism purely to please my father's parents. We had sort of an outline of a Jewish upbringing. So second-generation lapsed. My father's parents were full-on Zionists, but they lived in South Africa so we didn't see them that much. I sort of feel Jewish, but it doesn't inform my life or comedy particularly."
