= Political Animal (radio show) =

- Country of origin: United Kingdom
- Language: English
- Home station: BBC Radio 4
- Hosted by: Andy Zaltzman, John Oliver
- No. of series: 2
- No. of episodes: 11

Political Animal is a performance and radio show created by British comedians John Oliver and Andy Zaltzman in which various stand-up comedians perform political material.

Political Animal began at the 2004 Edinburgh Festival Fringe and has returned regularly since, it was initially co-hosted by Zaltzman and Oliver but since 2006 hosted by Zaltzman alone except for some of the 2011 fringe where Oliver returned. In 2007 Political Animal also became a radio series on BBC Radio 4. It returned for a second series in 2008, running for 10 episodes. The series took the form of a stand-up show, with Zaltzman and Oliver performing in between the acts they introduced.

Previous guests have included Frankie Boyle, Daniel Kitson, Stewart Lee, Richard Herring, Jeremy Hardy, Marcus Brigstocke, Robert Newman, Chris Addison, Russell Howard and Russell Brand.

== Episodes ==
=== Pilot ===
Ep	Guests	Original air date
1	Edinburgh Festival Special: Stewart Lee, Steve Hughes, Mark Watson	31 August 2005

=== Series 1 ===
Ep	Guests	Original air date
1	Pete Cain, Jeremy Hardy and Glenn Wool	4 April 2007
2	Wil Hodgson, Tony Law and Robert Newman	11 April 2007
3	Russell Brand, Natalie Haynes and Andy Parsons	18 April 2007
4	Nick Doody, Richard Herring and Russell Howard	25 April 2007

=== Series 2 ===
Ep	Title	Original air date
1	Mark Steel, Paul Sinha and Lewis Schaffer	10 June 2008
2	Frankie Boyle, Ian Stone and Stewart Lee	17 June 2008
3	John Mulaney, Mike Birbiglia and Lee Camp	24 June 2008
4	Glenn Wool, Shappi Khorsandi and John Hegley	1 July 2008
5	Steve Hughes, Natalie Haynes and Nick Doody	8 July 2008
6	Stephen Grant, Chris Addison and David Cross	15 July 2008

== Controversy ==
In 2010, BBC apologised for Frankie Boyle's joke in which the comedian compared Palestine to a cake being 'punched to pieces by a very angry Jew'.
