= The News Quiz =

British topical radio panel show (since 1977)

- Genre: Panel game
- Running time: 30 minutes (6:30 pm – 7:00 pm)
- Country of origin: United Kingdom
- Language: English
- Home station: BBC Radio 4
- Syndicates: BBC Radio 4 Extra
- Hosted by: Barry Norman (Series 1–2); Barry Took (Series 3–5 & 13–35); Simon Hoggart (Series 5–13 & 36–59); Sandi Toksvig (Series 60–88); Miles Jupp (Series 89–99); Guest hosts (Series 100); Nish Kumar (Series 101); Angela Barnes (Series 102); Andy Zaltzman (Series 103 – present)
- Announcer: Various BBC Radio 4 newsreaders
- Created by: John Lloyd
- Produced by: Various (see below)
- Edited by: Marc Willcox (2005-present)
- Recording studio: BBC Radio Theatre
- Original release: 6 September 1977
- No. of series: 117
- No. of episodes: 1,004 (As of 27 May 2022)
- Audio format: Stereo
- Opening theme: The Typewriter by Leroy Anderson
- Website: www.bbc.co.uk/radio4/newsquiz
- Podcast: Friday Night comedy podcast

The News Quiz is a British topical panel game broadcast on BBC Radio 4. Since launching in 1977, the show, created by John Lloyd from an idea by Nicholas Parsons, has seen several hosts, including Barry Norman, Barry Took, Simon Hoggart, Sandi Toksvig, Miles Jupp and Andy Zaltzman, currently the host since series 103. The show involves four panellists, often comedians or journalists, who answer questions about events of the previous week, often leading to humorous and satirical exchanges. The show was adapted for television in 1981 and has also inspired other shows, such as Have I Got News for You.

== History ==
The News Quiz was created by John Lloyd, based on an idea by Nicholas Parsons.

The series was first broadcast in 1977 with Barry Norman in the chair. Subsequently, it was chaired by Barry Took from 1979 to 1981, Simon Hoggart from 1981 to 1986, Took again from 1986 to 1995, and then again by Hoggart from 1996 until March 2006. Hoggart was replaced by Sandi Toksvig in September 2006, who in turn was replaced by Miles Jupp in September 2015 until his departure at the end of 2019. Three different hosts took the chair in 2020; Nish Kumar (series 101), Angela Barnes (series 102), and Andy Zaltzman (series 103). At the end of series 103, it was announced that Zaltzman would continue as permanent host.

Originally, Private Eye editor Richard Ingrams and Punch editor Alan Coren acted as team captains.

It was adapted for television in 1981 under the title Scoop, running for two series, and later inspired the television programme Have I Got News for You.

In 2012, the BBC piloted an American version hosted by Lewis Black.

On 28 June 2013, the News Quiz paid tribute after the death of Radio 4 announcer Rory Morrison, who had read the news cuttings on the programme.

During series 97, running from August to October 2018, Jupp was absent due to filming commitments overseas, so show regulars Simon Evans, Susan Calman, Fred MacAulay, Bridget Christie, Jo Brand and Lucy Porter took turns in the host's seat. Jupp himself chaired the first and last episodes of the series.

In May 2019, it was announced that Jupp would leave the show at the end of the 99th series at the end of the month. Series 100 had several hosts: Nish Kumar, Angela Barnes, Andy Zaltzman, Phil Wang, Kiri Pritchard-McLean, Zoe Lyons, Patrick Kielty and Andrew Maxwell. The hosts for 2020 were Nish Kumar, Angela Barnes, and Andy Zaltzman. Zaltzman was named as the permanent host at the conclusion of series 103.

== Transmission ==
The News Quiz is usually recorded in front of an audience on Thursday evenings at the BBC Radio Theatre at Broadcasting House in London. It is then edited and broadcast first on Friday evening at 18:30, then repeated at Saturday lunchtime at 12:30, and the programme runs for three series per year. The final 28-minute show is significantly shorter than the original recording. In 2012, the BBC began making an extended version for BBC Radio 4 Extra.

Each week, four panellists appear on the show. They are usually either comedians or journalists, and sometimes politicians. Journalists predominated in the early years. The ostensible purpose of the show is to test contestants' knowledge of the events of the previous week by asking questions which are usually oblique references to those events. However, this has given way to a general free-for-all where panellists chime in with their own humorous and satirical remarks once the question has been answered. The participants frequently wander off topic. The host ends the discussion of each question with a summary of the events it refers to, usually with a scripted comic punchline, before asking the next question. It is not uncommon for the show to get through only two rounds of the panel before the final section is reached. Before the host announces the largely symbolic scores, the panellists read out statements from newspapers and other media which they find amusing.

== Personnel ==
=== Current host ===
In 2020, Andy Zaltzman guest hosted series 103 and at the end of the run was announced as the new permanent host.

=== Former hosts ===
- Barry Norman (1977–1979)
- Barry Took (1979–1981 & 1986–1995)
- Simon Hoggart (1981–1985 & 1996–2006)
- Sandi Toksvig (2006–2015)
- Miles Jupp (2015–2019, series 88–99)
- Nish Kumar, Angela Barnes, Andy Zaltzman, Phil Wang, Kiri Pritchard-McLean, Zoe Lyons, Patrick Kielty and Andrew Maxwell (September – October 2019, series 100)
- Nish Kumar (2020, series 101)
- Angela Barnes (2020, series 102)

=== Current regular panellists ===
- Susan Calman
- Simon Evans
- Andy Hamilton
- Helen Lewis
- Ria Lina
- Zoe Lyons
- Fred MacAulay
- Lucy Porter
- Hugo Rifkind
- Mark Steel
- Angela Barnes
- Andrew Maxwell
- Daliso Chaponda

=== Former regular panellists ===
- Samira Ahmed
- Alan Coren
- Rebecca Front
- Jeremy Hardy
- Ian Hislop
- Simon Hoggart (also a former host)
- Armando Iannucci (also a former producer of the programme)
- Richard Ingrams
- Jonathan King
- Sue Perkins
- Carrie Quinlan
- Linda Smith
- Sandi Toksvig (later a host)
- Barry Took (also a former host)
- Francis Wheen

=== BBC newsreaders ===
The News Quiz once also featured input from regular BBC newsreaders (or "hacks-neutral", as Alan Coren referred to them), but have been dropped as of the post-Covid episodes.

News/continuity announcer Corrie Corfield appeared as a panellist once when Sandi Toksvig was unable to attend. As a current BBC newsreader she was bound by the BBC's code of practice for newsreaders, which prevented her from making any opinionated comments on-air. When asked, "What do you think of Bush, Corrie?", she responded, "He's an American". Peter Donaldson also appeared as a guest, in an episode broadcast in September 1999.

=== Producers ===
- Gwyn Rhys Davies
- Rajiv Karia
- Georgia Keating
- Suzy Grant
- Victoria Lloyd
- Richard Morris
- Joe Nunnery
- Paul Sheehan
- Lyndsay Fenner
- Sam Michell
- Sam Bryant
- Ed Morrish
- Katie Tyrrell
- Simon Nicholls
- Lucy Armitage
- Jon Rolph
- Aled Evans
- Harry Thompson
- Armando Iannucci
- John Lloyd
- Louise Coats

=== Scriptwriters ===
Each week, the chair's script is written by three main writers, with material contributed by one or two additional writers. Current regular writers include:

- Benjamin Partridge
- Alice Fraser
- Madeleine Brettingham
- Laura Major
- Mike Shephard
- Robin Morgan
- Max Davis
- Sarah Morgan
- Gabby Hutchinson Crouch
- Catherine Brinkworth
- Kat Sadler
- Simon Alcock

Former regular writers include:

- James Kettle
- Simon Littlefield
- Rhodri Crooks
- Lucy Clarke
- Gareth Gwynn
- John-Luke Roberts
- Jon Hunter
- Andy Wolton
- James Sherwood
- Stephen Carlin
- George Poles
- Paul McKenzie
- Dave Cohen
- Tom Jamieson
- Nev Fountain
- Debbie Barham
- Iain Pattinson (1990s)

== Music ==
The opening title music is an arrangement of The Typewriter, by Leroy Anderson played by The James Shepherd Versatile Brass. For the programme the original recording (on Decca records SB 314) has been increased in speed and pitch by about 33%.

== Cultural references ==
BBC MindGames magazine regularly featured several BBC-linked puzzles, including The News Quiz, a series of questions about the last month's more unlikely news. Issue 5 (November 2006) also included an interview with Sandi Toksvig.

== Audiobook releases ==
Entire series from series 87 onwards have been released on audio CD and made available for download. The following compilations have also been released by BBC Audio.

- Simon Hoggart's Pick of The News Quiz: Volume 1 (6 Nov 2000)
- Simon Hoggart's Pick of The News Quiz: Volume 2 (23 Sep 2002)
- The News Quiz: The First 25 Years (1 Jul 2003)
- The News Quiz: The Very Best Of 2004 (1 Nov 2004)
- The News Quiz: The Best of 2005 (18 Oct 2005)
- The News Quiz: Hold The Front Page (2 Oct 2006)
- The News Quiz: Stop Press! (1 Oct 2007)
- The News Quiz: "Read All About It!" (27 Nov 2008)
- The News Quiz: Soundbites (13 Nov 2014)
- The News Quiz: The Best Of 2015 (5 Nov 2015)
- The News Quiz: A Vintage Collection 1977–2002 (3 Aug 2017)
- The News Quiz: The Best Of 2017 (2 Nov 2017)
- The News Quiz: The Best Of 2018 (1 Nov 2018)
- The News Quiz: Classic Collection (audio download only, 15 Aug 2019)
- The News Quiz: The Best Of 2019 (7 Nov 2019)

== Podcast ==
As of 28 September 2007, The News Quiz became downloadable as part of the "Friday Night Comedy" podcast feed for Radio 4. At present, the podcast switches between The News Quiz, Dead Ringers, Current-ish (since 2026), The People Have Spoken (since 2026), and The Naked Week (since 2024), depending on which show is being transmitted. Previously included in this rotation were The Now Show, which ended in 2024; and Catherine Bohart: TL;DR, broadcast from 2024 to 2025.

During Miles Jupp's tenure, an extended version of the show entitled The News Quiz Extra, featuring an additional 10–15 minutes of material, was broadcast on BBC Radio 4 Extra in the week following the standard Radio 4 broadcast; this version was also made available as a podcast.
