= Alice Fraser =

Australian comedian and writer

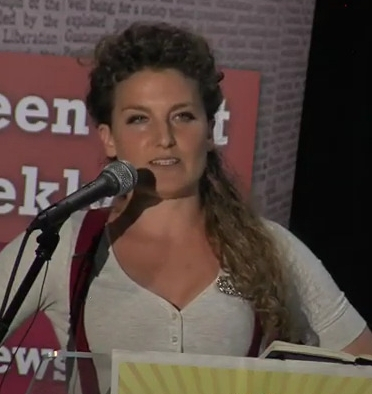
- Fraser in 2015
- Born: Alice Rebekah Fraser; Sydney, Australia
- Education: University of Sydney, University of Cambridge
- Notable work: Savage (2015); The Resistance (2016); Empire (2017); ETHOS (2018); MYTHOS (2019)
- Website: www.alicecomedyfraser.com

Alice Fraser is an Australian comedian, writer, podcaster, and actor.

== Early life and education ==
Fraser studied law at the University of Sydney before going on to earn a master's degree in English literature (Rhetoric) in Cambridge, England. Fraser returned to Australia and in 2013, she was nominated as best newcomer at the Sydney Comedy Festival.

== Career ==
Fraser made her film debut in the movie Never Hesitate as Emily in 2014. Also in 2014, Fraser spoke at a TEDx event at Macquarie University.

=== Trilogy ===
In 2015 Fraser began touring Savage, the first part of what she describes as an "unorthodox art-comedy/morality tale trilogy" which focuses on her upbringing and its impact on her life. The trilogy was completed by The Resistance in 2016 and Empire in 2017.

Each instalment of the trilogy was toured nationally and performed at the Melbourne Comedy Festival, Sydney Comedy Festival and The Edinburgh Fringe. Reviewing Empire, The Herald Sun called it a "beautifully word-rich performance" and said that Fraser's "interesting conversation makes her the perfect dinner guest – and comedian". Empire was also performed at the Edinburgh Fringe. The Alice Fraser Trilogy was commissioned as a six part podcast series on ABC Radio Podcasts.

=== Podcasting ===
In January 2017, Fraser received a Tomorrow Maker grant for her podcast, Tea with Alice. Previous guests on the podcast have included Wil Anderson, Neil Gaiman and Richard Herring. The Tea With Alice podcast is funded by Fraser's Patreon.

Fraser (centre) at a 2018 Bugle live show

In 2017, Fraser became a semi-regular co-host on the long running British podcast The Bugle, hosted by Andy Zaltzman. In January 2020, she launched The Bugle Presents... The Last Post, a daily 15-minute podcast of news from an alternate dimension, which The Guardian described as addressing topical issues "with impressive zeal and a clever script". In February 2021, Fraser began hosting The Gargle, a weekly podcast discussing non-political news stories, describing itself as the "audio glossy magazine" to The Bugle's audio newspaper.

in 2019 and 2020, Fraser worked with neuroscientist Ash Ranpura on a number of documentaries produced by Somethin' Else for Audible, including the bestselling In The Habit: Introduction to Habit Change. Fraser also created and cohosted a show for BBC Radio with astrophysicist and science educator Jen Gupta, called Stranger Than Sci Fi.

Fraser is a regular writer and guest on the BBC Radio panel show The News Quiz.

In 2025, Fraser created The Bugle Presents... Realms Unknown a weekly podcast discussing fantasy, Sci Fi and speculative fiction with a range of special guest including Tom Neenan, Myq Kaplan, Eleanor Morton and Chris Skinner.

Also in 2025, Fraser and showrunner Kat Viken created AI & The Creative Professional to discuss the impact of AI on creative careers, with celebrity guests in film, TV, comedy and arts.

=== Video games ===
Fraser appeared in voiceover in the 2020 game Watch Dogs: Legion, as co-host with Andy Zaltzman of fictional radio station The Bug, in the style of her work with Zaltzman on The Bugle.

=== Book ===
Her first book, A Passion for Passion: A Delirious Love Letter to Romance, was published in 2025 by Unbound (publisher). The audiobook version was released in late 2025.

== Media ==
In 2025, Fraser made international news after a proposed US book tour had to be cancelled over her fears that her work doing political satire and having made jokes about Donald Trump could lead to detention at the border.

== Personal life ==
Fraser's paternal grandfather was a naturalised Briton, born Adolf Friedenberg, later changing his name to Andrew Peter Fraser. Her father is a Jewish-turned-Buddhist professor of law named Michael Fraser. She has two children.

== Works ==
=== Comedy shows ===
Title	Years
Everyone's A Winner	2014
Savage	2015
The Resistance	2016
Empire	2017
ETHOS	2018
MYTHOS	2019
GENERATION	2021
Chronos	2022
Twist	2023
A Passion for Passion	2025

=== Podcasts ===
Title	Years	Role
The Bugle	2017–present	Regular co-host
Tea With Alice	2018–present	Host
Troll Play	2018	Co-host
Calm World Introduction to Meditation	2018	Co-host
In The Habit Introduction to Changing Our Behaviour	2018	Co-host
All Being Well Introduction to The World of Wellness	2019	Co-host
The Last Post	2020	Host
Make Life Work	2020	Co-host
The Gargle	2021–present	Host
Realms Unknown	2025–present	Host
AI & The Creative Professional	2025	Co-host
