= John Oliver =

British and American comedian and television personality (born 1977)

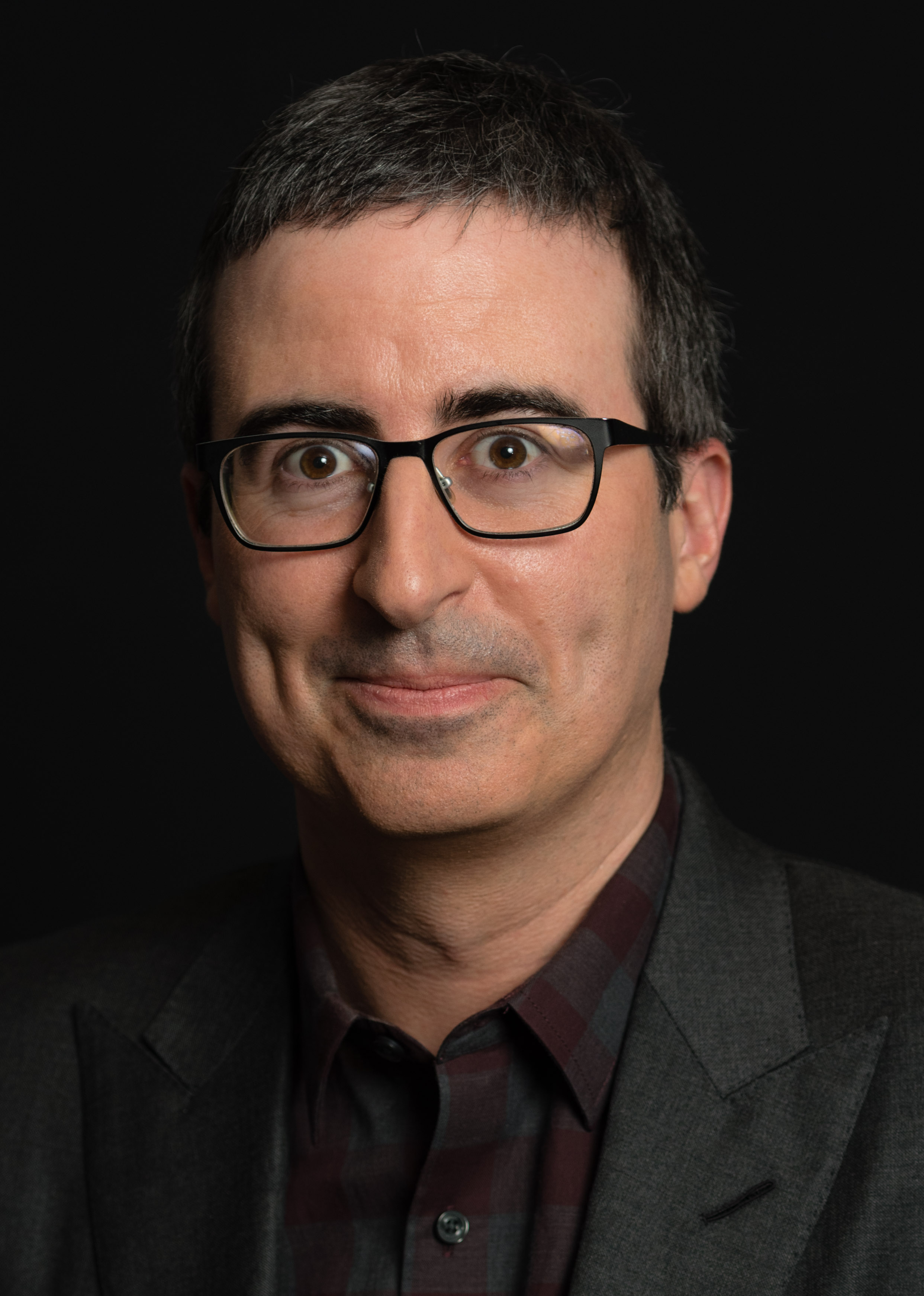
- Oliver in 2016
- Born: 23 April 1977 (age 49); Birmingham, England
- Citizenship: United Kingdom; United States (since 2019)
- Education: Christ's College, Cambridge (BA)
- Spouse: Kate Norley (m. 2011)
- Children: 2
- Relatives: Stephen Oliver (uncle)

Comedy career
- Years active: 2001–present
- Medium: Stand-up; television; film; books
- Genres: Political/news satire; observational comedy; black comedy; sarcasm; cringe comedy; surreal humour
- Subjects: American politics; British culture; political punditry; popular culture; current events; mass media/news media; civil rights; self-deprecation
- Website: iamjohnoliver.com

John William Oliver (born 23 April 1977) is a British and American comedian, political commentator, actor, and television personality. He hosts Last Week Tonight with John Oliver on HBO and started his career as a stand-up comedian in the United Kingdom. He came to wider attention for his work in the United States as the senior British correspondent on The Daily Show with Jon Stewart from 2006 to 2013.

Oliver won three Primetime Emmy Awards for writing for The Daily Show and became its guest host for eight weeks in 2013. He also co-hosted the comedy podcast The Bugle with Andy Zaltzman, with whom Oliver had previously worked on the radio series Political Animal and The Department. From 2010 to 2013, he hosted the stand-up series John Oliver's New York Stand-Up Show on Comedy Central. His acting roles include Ian Duncan on the NBC sitcom Community, as well as voice work in the animated films The Smurfs (2011), The Smurfs 2 (2013), Wonder Park and The Lion King remake (both 2019).

As the host of Last Week Tonight since 2014, Oliver has received widespread critical and popular recognition for the series, including winning twenty Emmy Awards and two Peabody Awards. The show's influence over US culture, legislation, and policymaking has been dubbed the "John Oliver effect", and he was included in the 2015 Time 100, where he was described as a "comedic agent of change [...] powerful because he isn't afraid to tackle important issues thoughtfully, without fear or apology". His work has been described as journalism or investigative journalism, labels that he rejects. He became an American citizen in 2019.

== Early life ==
John William Oliver was born in the Birmingham suburb of Erdington on 23 April 1977, the son of music teacher Carole and school headmaster and social worker Jim Oliver. His mother is from Liverpool, while his father is from the Wirral. He has a younger sister who lives in Australia. His uncle was the composer Stephen Oliver. He grew up in Bedford, where he attended the Mark Rutherford School and learned to play the viola.

He was raised Anglican, but later told interviewer Terry Gross that he lapsed at the age of 12 after the death of a school friend and an uncle, followed by a feeling of receiving no useful answers from the church. In the mid-to-late 1990s, he studied at Christ's College, Cambridge, where he was a member of the Cambridge Footlights. His Footlights contemporaries included comedians David Mitchell and Richard Ayoade, and he became the club's vice president in 1997. He and Footlights president Ayoade wrote and performed in several productions together, appearing in both Footlights' 1997 and 1998 touring shows: Emotional Baggage (directed by Matthew Holness) and Between a Rock and a Hard Place (directed by Cal McCrystal). In 1998, Oliver graduated with a degree in English.

Since childhood, he has been a fan of Liverpool F.C., noting in interviews that "my mum's family are from Knotty Ash and my dad's family are from the Wirral, so supporting Liverpool was very much not a choice".

== Career ==
=== 1985–2005: Early career ===
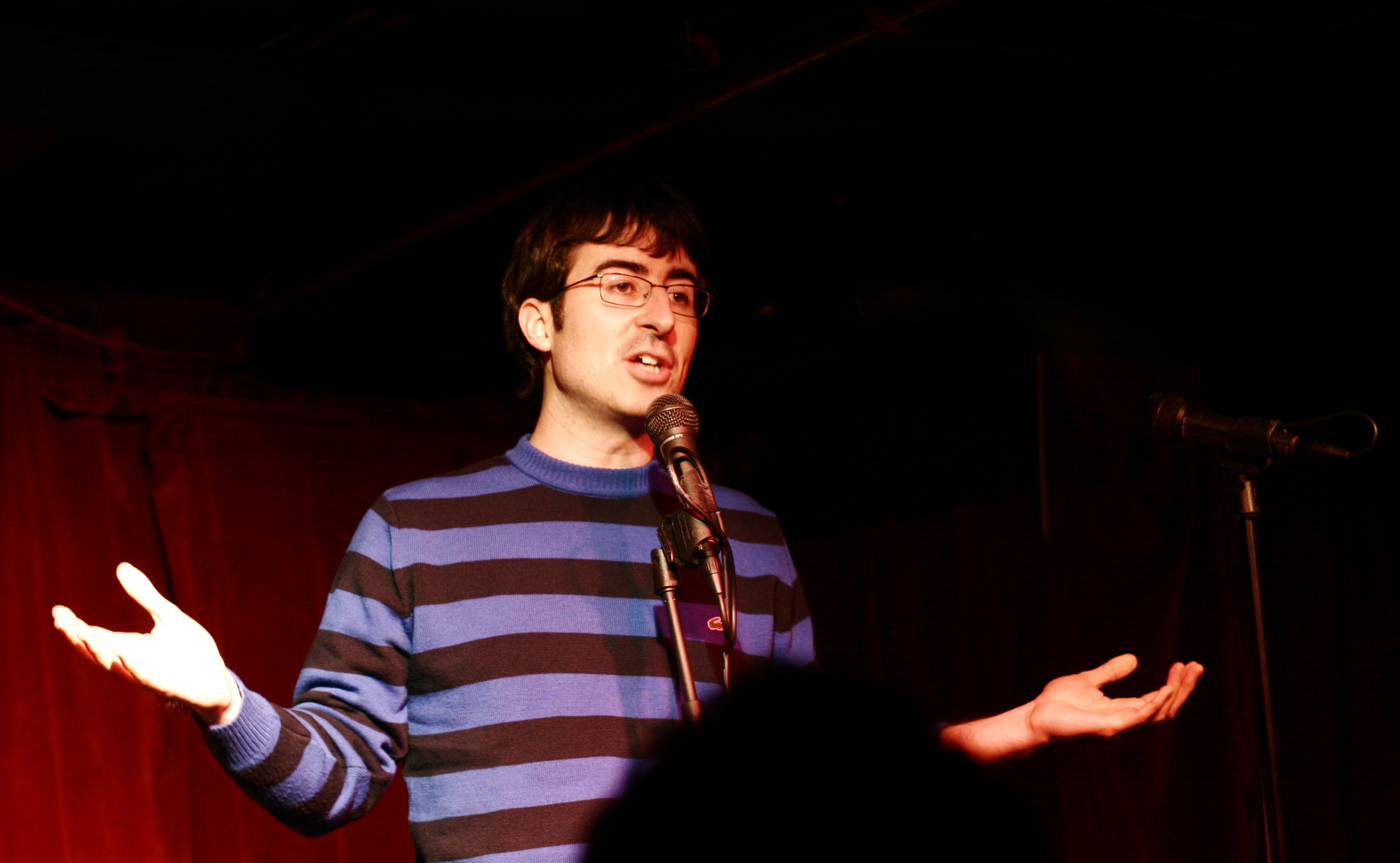
Oliver in 2007

In 1985, Oliver made his first on-screen appearance playing Felix Pardiggle, a minor role in the BBC drama Bleak House. In an appearance on Late Night with Seth Meyers, he commented, "When I was six years old ... [the BBC] wanted a kid with dark hair and brown eyes, and I was two-for-two on that". In 2001, Oliver appeared as a bank manager in series two of People Like Us. Oliver said in a later Seth Meyers appearance that one of his first paying jobs was writing for the British morning show The Big Breakfast.

Oliver's first major stand-up appearance was at the 2001 Edinburgh Festival Fringe as part of the late-night showcase The Comedy Zone, where he played an "oleaginous journalist". Oliver frequently worked with other members of the comedian group the Chocolate Milk Gang, including Daniel Kitson, Russell Howard, David O'Doherty, and Alun Cochrane. His debut solo show was at the 2002 Edinburgh Festival Fringe, and he returned the following year. In 2004 and 2005, he performed in a double act and co-hosted the political radio show Political Animal with Andy Zaltzman.

From 2002 to 2003, Oliver worked on the BBC Three comedy series The State We're In, along with Anita Rani, Jon Holmes, and Robin Ince. In 2003, Oliver manned the "results desk" on an election night episode of Armando Iannucci's satirical show Gash on Channel 4. In 2004, Oliver wrote and performed in the satirical radio programme The Department on BBC Radio 4 with Andy Zaltzman and Chris Addison. Starting in June 2005, Oliver made appearances on British television as a panellist on the satirical news show Mock the Week, and became a frequent guest on the first two series.

=== 2006–2013: The Daily Show with Jon Stewart ===
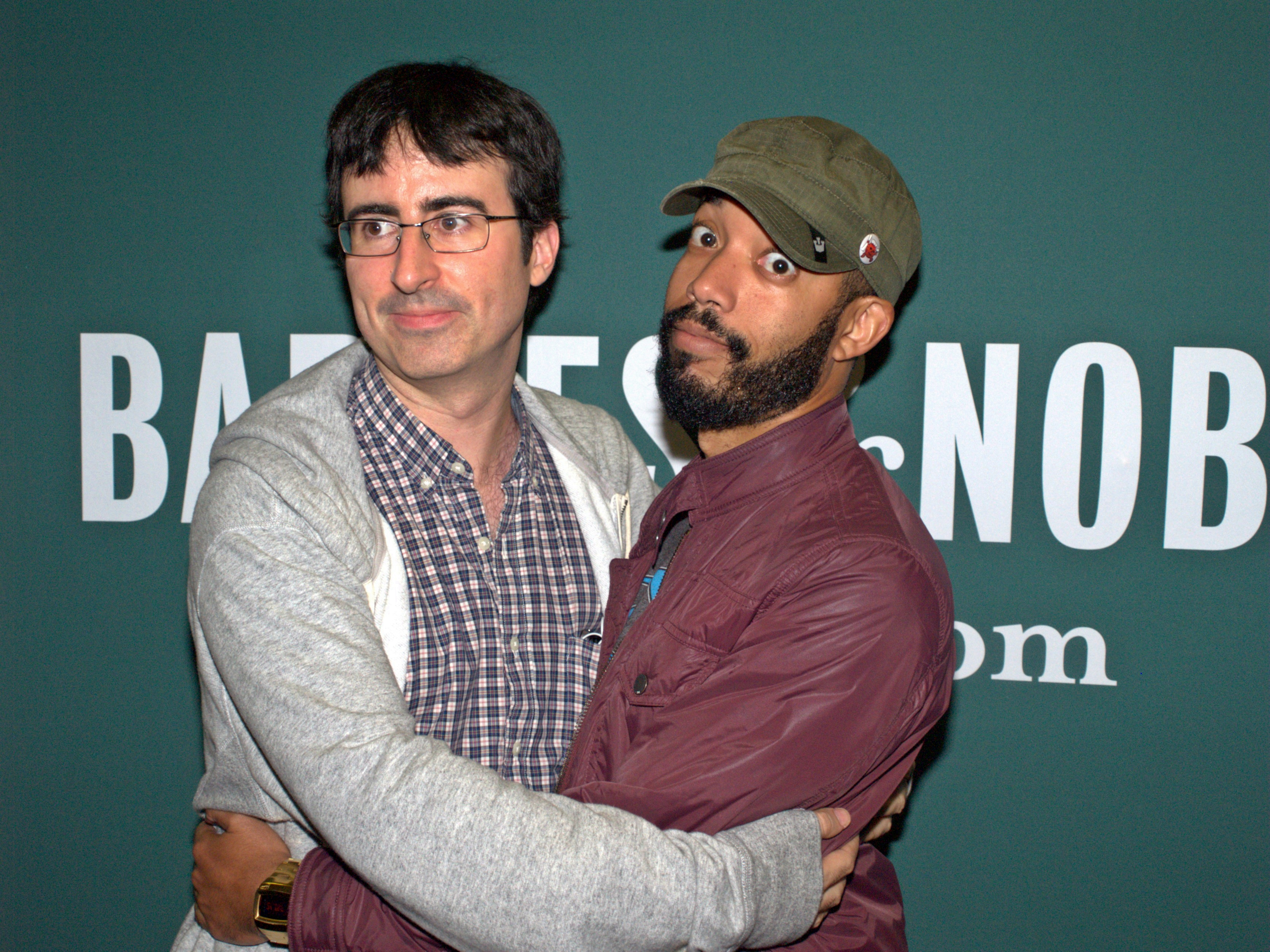
Oliver with Daily Show co-correspondent Wyatt Cenac at the launch of Earth

In July 2006, Oliver joined The Daily Show with Jon Stewart as its Senior British Correspondent. He says he was interviewed for the show on the recommendation of comedian Ricky Gervais, who had never met Oliver, but was familiar with his work. Two weeks after the interview, he got the job, flying from London to New York City on a Sunday and unexpectedly appearing on camera the next day. Oliver received Emmy Awards for Outstanding Writing for a Variety Series for The Daily Show in 2009, 2011, and 2012.

In 2007, Oliver wrote and presented a BBC America campaign to have viewers use closed captions. Shown in brief segments before shows, one of the campaign messages said, "The following program contains accents you would have heard a lot more if you hadn't thrown our tea into Boston Harbor," another "Not even British people can follow the British accent 100 per cent of the time. Therefore you, like me, might want to use closed-captioning." Oliver used some of these jokes in his stand-up routine.

After moving to New York City, Oliver began performing stand-up comedy in clubs, later headlining shows in larger venues. From October 2007 to May 2015, Oliver co-hosted The Bugle, a weekly comedy podcast, with Andy Zaltzman. Originally produced by The Times, it became an independent project in 2012. In 2008, John Oliver: Terrifying Times, his first stand-up special, premiered on Comedy Central.

In 2009, Comedy Central announced that it would be ordering six episodes of the John Oliver's New York Stand-Up Show, a series on Comedy Central that featured sets from himself and other comedians, including Janeane Garofalo, Brian Posehn, Paul F. Tompkins and Marc Maron. From 2010 to 2013, four seasons were produced. In 2013, he went to Afghanistan on a USO tour to perform for the troops. Oliver continues to perform stand-up.

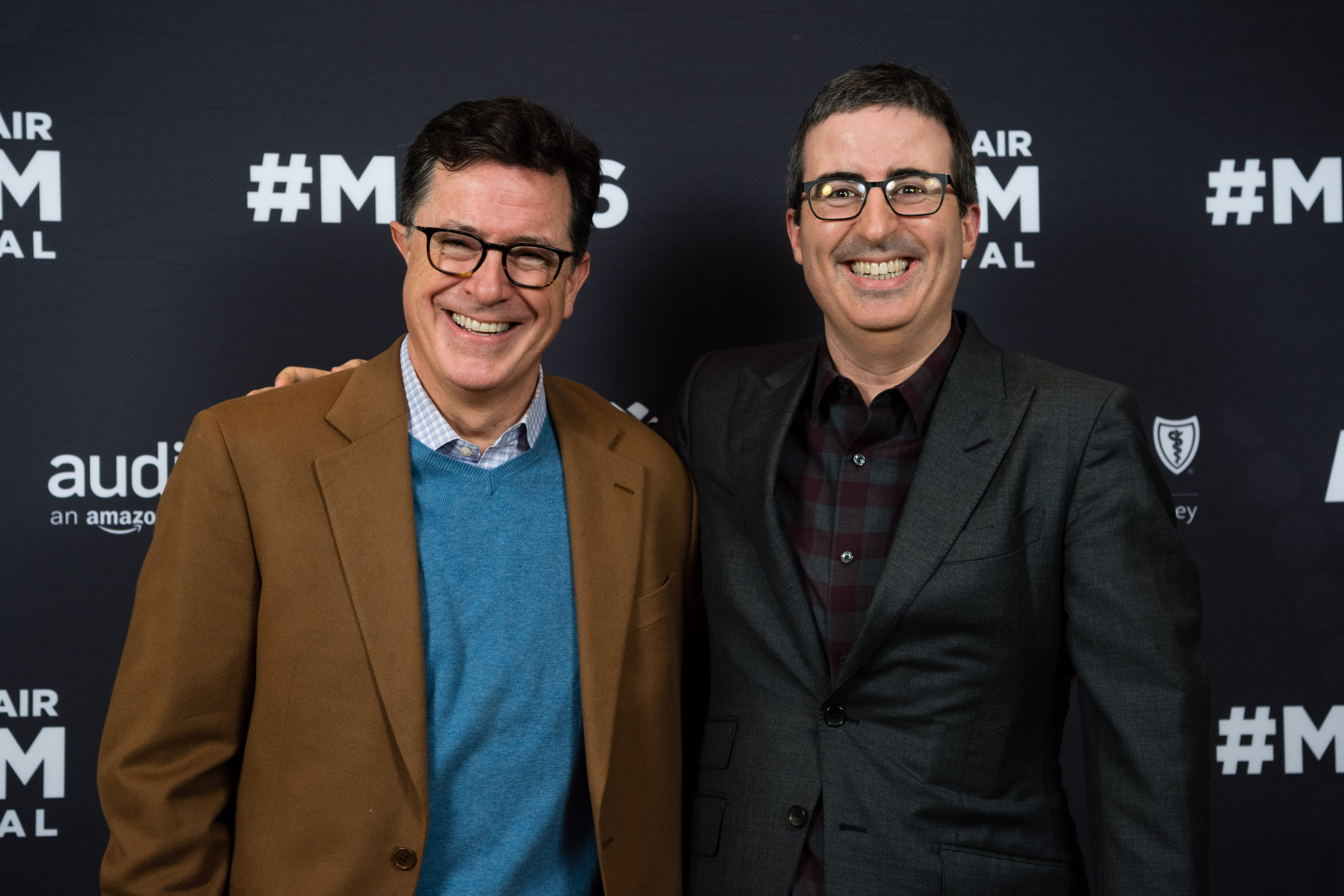
Oliver and Stephen Colbert at the Montclair Film Festival in New Jersey

Oliver had a recurring role on the NBC sitcom Community as the professor of psychology Ian Duncan. Owing to his work at The Daily Show, he declined the offer to become a regular member of the cast, and did not appear in the third, fourth, or sixth seasons, but returned in season five, appearing in seven of its thirteen episodes. In 2008, Oliver played Dick Pants in The Love Guru, his first film role. He later voiced Vanity Smurf in The Smurfs film and its sequel. Oliver performed several roles in the 2009 Comedy Central series Important Things with Demetri Martin. In 2009, Oliver made a cameo appearance in the music video for The Fiery Furnaces' single "Even in the Rain".

Starting in June 2013, Oliver guest-hosted The Daily Show for eight weeks while Stewart directed his film Rosewater. Oliver's performance received positive reviews, with some critics suggesting that he should eventually succeed Stewart as the host, or receive his own show. CBS discussed the possibility of Oliver replacing Craig Ferguson on The Late Late Show. Three months after his role as the interim Daily Show host ended, HBO announced it was giving Oliver his own late-night show.

=== 2014–present: Last Week Tonight with John Oliver ===
Title card for Last Week Tonight with John Oliver

In 2014, Oliver began hosting his late-night news satire show Last Week Tonight with John Oliver. The show features thoroughly researched segments dedicated to topics or events in the news. His initial two-year contract was extended through to 2017 in 2015, to 2020 in September 2017, to 2023 in September 2020, and to 2026 in December 2023. Oliver has stated that he has full creative freedom, including free rein to criticise corporations, given HBO's ad-free subscription model.

In 2015, Oliver was named one of Time 100 influential people of the year for his work on the show. Across the TV airings, DVR, on-demand, and HBO Go, Last Week Tonight averaged 4.1 million weekly viewers in its first season. In 2014, Last Week Tonight was honoured with a Peabody Award in the "Entertainment" category for "bringing satire and journalism even closer together". The show received a second award in 2017. The show has also won 26 Primetime Emmy Awards, five Writers Guild of America Awards, eight Producers Guild Awards, and three Critics' Choice Television Awards.

Oliver has guest-starred in several TV shows, including The Simpsons as Booth Wilkes-John (2014); Gravity Falls as the voice of Sherlock Holmes (2012); Rick and Morty as an amoeba named Dr Xenon Bloom (2013); Randy Cunningham: 9th Grade Ninja as the voice of Coach Green (2012–15); My Hero as a man from the BBC (2001); Green Wing as a car salesman (2004); Big Mouth as the camp counsellor Harry (2020); and Bob's Burgers as a cat agent (2017).

Oliver was originally cast in 2010 to star in the Terry Jones film Absolutely Anything as Neil Clarke, but scheduling conflicts due to the debut of Last Week Tonight in 2014 led to the role being recast for Simon Pegg. In 2019, Oliver voiced the porcupine Steve in the CGI animated film Wonder Park and hornbill Zazu in the remake of Disney's The Lion King. From 2018 to 2019, Oliver worked as an executive producer for Wyatt Cenac's Problem Areas.

On 30 August 2023, Oliver began hosting the comedy podcast Strike Force Five with Jimmy Fallon, Jimmy Kimmel, Stephen Colbert and Seth Meyers, to support their staff members out of work due to the 2023 Writers Guild of America strike. In the summer of 2026, Oliver appeared in story arcs on the American soap operas General Hospital and Days of Our Lives after discussing his personal fondness for soap operas in a March 2026 Last Week Tonight segment and offering to appear on any soap opera interested in casting him.

== Influences ==
Oliver has said that among his comedic influences are Armando Iannucci, David Letterman, Monty Python, Peter Cook, Richard Pryor, and Jon Stewart. Oliver said regarding Monty Python, "I saw Life of Brian in middle school, when a substitute teacher put it on to keep us quiet on a rainy day ... I've never forgotten how it made me feel". Edward Helmore wrote in The Guardian about Oliver's comedy, "His style leans toward the kind that Americans like best from the British – exaggerated, full of odd accents and mannerisms, in the vein of Monty Python." Oliver describes his own accent as a "mongrel" of Brummie, Scouse, and Bedford influences.

== Views ==
Oliver was opposed to Brexit. He stated that it was "sad" to consider that his children with British citizenship would not experience the benefits of the EU. He has been particularly critical of the Conservative Party and of its former leader Boris Johnson's premiership. He also criticised the Royal Family's secrecy concerning their wealth, calling them "a freeloading multimillionaire family exempt from paying most taxes" and stating that "the Royal Family's wealth—unlike its gene pool—is massive".

He supports abolishing the British monarchy and making Britain a republic, and declined an OBE. On a September 2022 episode of Late Night with Seth Meyers, he said he declined it because he did not want his name being associated with the words "British Empire" and expressed distaste for the British class system.

Oliver favoured Joe Biden for president in the 2020 election and celebrated Biden's victory over Donald Trump. He warned that "more than 70 million people voted for [Trump] and everything he said and stands for, and that is something we are going to have to reckon with for the foreseeable future". He has been strongly critical of Trump and the Republican Party, later endorsing Kamala Harris for president in the 2024 election. Politico argued that Oliver criticised liberal politicians as much as those on the right.

== Legacy ==
=== Reception and the "John Oliver effect" ===
Oliver's comedic commentary has been credited with influencing US legislation, regulations, court rulings, and other aspects of US culture; this has been dubbed the "John Oliver effect". This came from the show's fifth episode, which dealt with net neutrality, a subject that had previously been considered obscure and technical. Oliver documented problems attributed to Internet service providers and argued that the Federal Communications Commission (FCC) could resolve these concerns with upcoming changes to Internet regulation. Oliver then encouraged viewers to submit public comments through the FCC's website. The FCC's website promptly crashed. Internal FCC emails revealed that the clip was being watched inside the agency. The FCC Chairman Tom Wheeler publicly addressed the video.

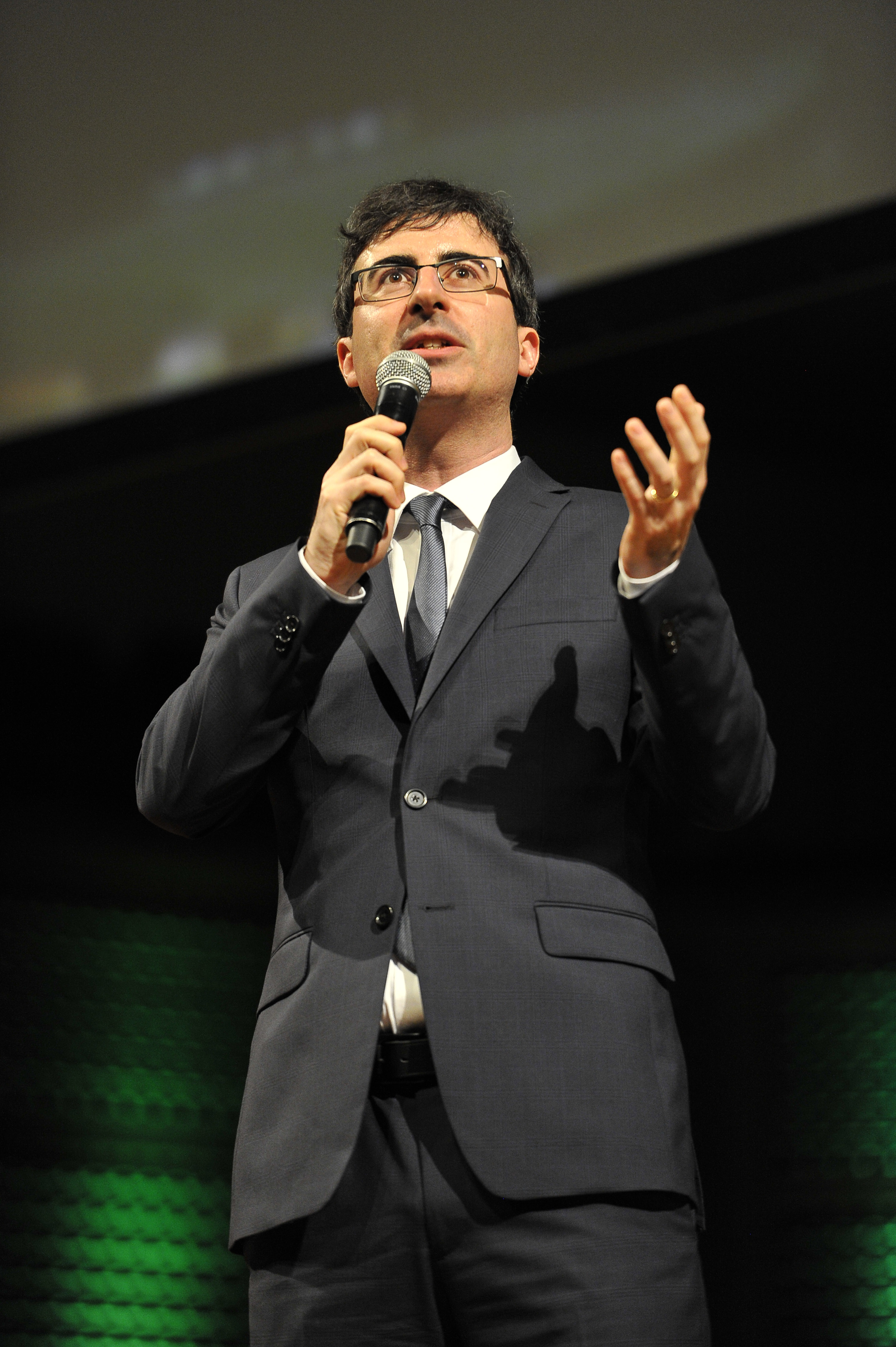
Oliver speaking at the 2014 Crunchies

The day after the broadcast, the FCC had received over 45,000 comments on net neutrality; in total, it received 3.7 million comments on the subject, by far the most for any issue in the agency's history. Reporters detected a shift in the FCC's stance: Before Oliver's segment, The New York Times described an FCC proposal that would leave net neutrality "all but dead", but the paper later said that Wheeler showed "a steady shift toward stronger regulation".

A 2018 study found that viewers of Last Week Tonight and The Colbert Report were generally more familiar with net neutrality than non-viewers; Last Week Tonight viewers were also more likely to support strict regulation to ensure net neutrality. In the end, the FCC enacted robust net neutrality rules that classified the broadband Internet service as a public utility. Oliver was credited with transforming the net neutrality debate.

A Ninth Circuit Court judge cited a Last Week Tonight segment about the lesser constitutional rights of residents of US territories in a ruling in favour of the residents of Guam. (Note: See: "U.S. Territories: Last Week Tonight with John Oliver (HBO)". YouTube. 8 March 2015. Archived from the original on 22 December 2021.) Members of Congress credited Oliver with helping to win a vote to enforce protections for chicken farmers who speak out about industry practices, after a Last Week Tonight segment on the subject. (Note: See: "Chickens: Last Week Tonight with John Oliver (HBO)". YouTube. 17 May 2015. Archived from the original on 22 December 2021.) A Washington, D.C., council member proposed a resolution in Oliver's honour after he aired a segment on the district's struggle to attain statehood. (Note: See: "Washington DC Statehood: Last Week Tonight with John Oliver (HBO)". YouTube. 2 August 2015. Archived from the original on 22 December 2021.) A study published in 2022 found that "calls for action" by Oliver in seasons seven and eight of Last Week Tonight raised over $5 million for charities and other causes.

Oliver maintains that he is not a journalist, but reporters have contended that his show is a form of journalism. The Peabody Awards honoured Oliver, saying his programme engages in "investigative reports that 'real' news programs would do well to emulate". One example of Oliver's investigative work is a segment on the Miss America organization, which bills itself as "the world's largest provider of scholarships for women". Oliver's team, which includes four researchers with journalism backgrounds, collected and analysed the organization's state and federal tax returns to find that its scholarship programme only distributes a small fraction of the claimed "$45 million made available annually".

Oliver said that at the national level, the Miss America Organization and Miss America Foundation together spent only $482,000 in cash scholarships in 2012. As of October 2024, the official YouTube video of Oliver's Miss America segment has been viewed more than 24 million times. The Society of Women Engineers said Oliver's reference to their scholarship led to $25,000 in donations over the subsequent two days.

In 2015, Oliver founded and legally incorporated a church, Our Lady of Perpetual Exemption, to demonstrate how easy it is to qualify as a church and receive tax-exempt status in the United States. The church was created in conjunction with a segment on televangelists who have tax-free mansions and private jets funded by millions of dollars in donations, which are sent in the belief that money given to televangelists can result in God rewarding donors with money, blessings, and by curing diseases. (Note: See: "Televangelists: Last Week Tonight with John Oliver (HBO)". YouTube. 16 August 2015. Archived from the original on 22 December 2021.) The next week, Oliver showed off the large quantity of donations posted to him, which included $70,000 in cash, a large cheque, and other gifts. The church's website stated that donations would go to Doctors Without Borders upon the church's dissolution.

Oliver's February 2016 segment on presidential candidate Donald Trump received 62 million views on Facebook and 23 million on YouTube within a month, and was reportedly the "most watched piece of HBO content ever". A network spokesperson said that this was "a record for any piece of HBO content". Oliver's commentary surrounding the 2016 United States presidential election received some media criticism of contributing to polarisation, including from Zac Dacis for the Jesuit America magazine, who wrote that Oliver "coddles his viewers by convincing them (as if they needed more convincing) of how right they are, how wrong they are, how many more facts they know than them". Oliver later said that his February 2016 segment "got out of hand" and expressed some regret over his coverage.

In 2018 on Last Week Tonight, Oliver presented the children's book A Day in the Life of Marlon Bundo, a parody of Marlon Bundo's A Day in the Life of the Vice President. A Day in the Life of Marlon Bundo featured Marlon Bundo, the pet rabbit of 48th US Vice President Mike Pence, in a gay relationship. During the 2023 Reddit API controversy, the major subreddits r/pics, r/gifs, and r/aww, among others, protested at Reddit's API policy changes by only allowing content containing Oliver.

=== John Oliver Koala Chlamydia Ward ===
In May 2018, actor Russell Crowe donated approximately $80,000 to the Australia Zoo wildlife hospital for the creation and naming of "The John Oliver Koala Chlamydia Ward". Oliver had previously bought in an auction several film props that had been used by Crowe, including his jockstrap from Cinderella Man, which he sent to one of the last Alaskan Blockbuster Video shops for exhibition. Crowe then donated the proceeds from the auction towards the establishment of the Chlamydia Ward named after Oliver, calling it "a cool way" to honour him. Covering the story on his show, Oliver admitted admiration for the gag: "Well played, Russell Crowe. Well played indeed. That may honestly be the greatest thing I've ever seen." Crowe visited the ward in early 2020, posing with the nameplate bearing Oliver's name.

=== John Oliver Memorial Sewer Plant ===
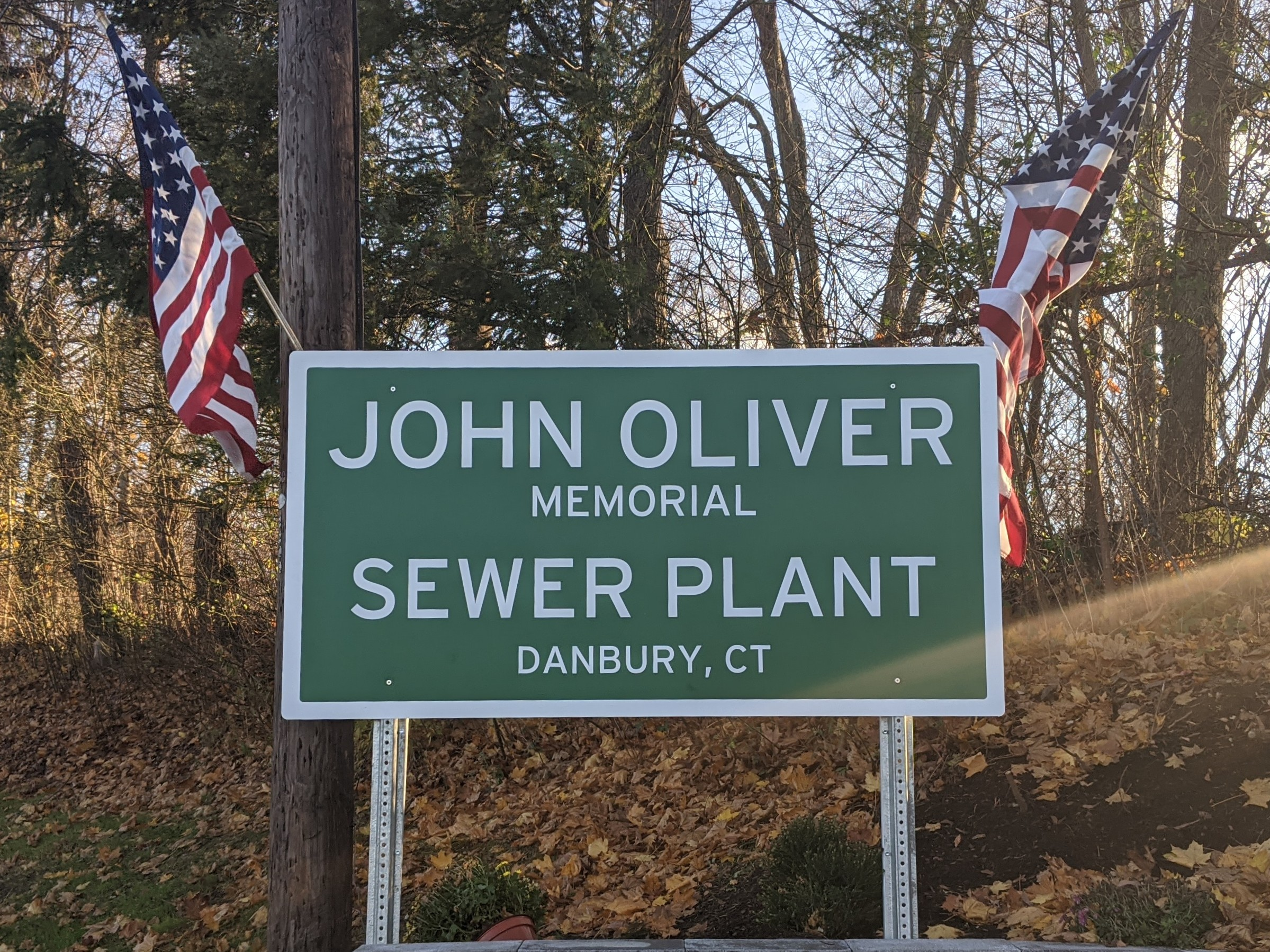
A sign at the John Oliver Memorial Sewer Plant

In August 2020, the mayor of Danbury, Connecticut, Mark Boughton, announced in a Facebook video his intention to rename the Danbury Water Pollution Control Plant as the "John Oliver Memorial Sewer Plant" as a comedic symbol of his displeasure at Oliver's hyperbolic insult to the city during a segment concerning alleged racial disparities in a jury selection process. After reporting that Connecticut jury rolls had excluded two entire towns, Oliver said, "If you're going to forget a town in Connecticut, why not forget Danbury?" Oliver then humorously offered to "thrash" the entire town, including its children.

As a response to Boughton's video, Oliver embraced the idea enthusiastically, promising to donate $55,000 to Danbury charities if the city renamed the sewage plant after him. After the city council voted 18–1 in favour of naming the plant after him, Oliver visited Danbury to attend the unveiling ceremony on 8 October 2020 in person, wearing a hazmat suit. Mayor Boughton had made Oliver's personal attendance a condition for the renaming, and Oliver complied, revealing footage of his trip on Last Week Tonight the following week.

== Personal life ==
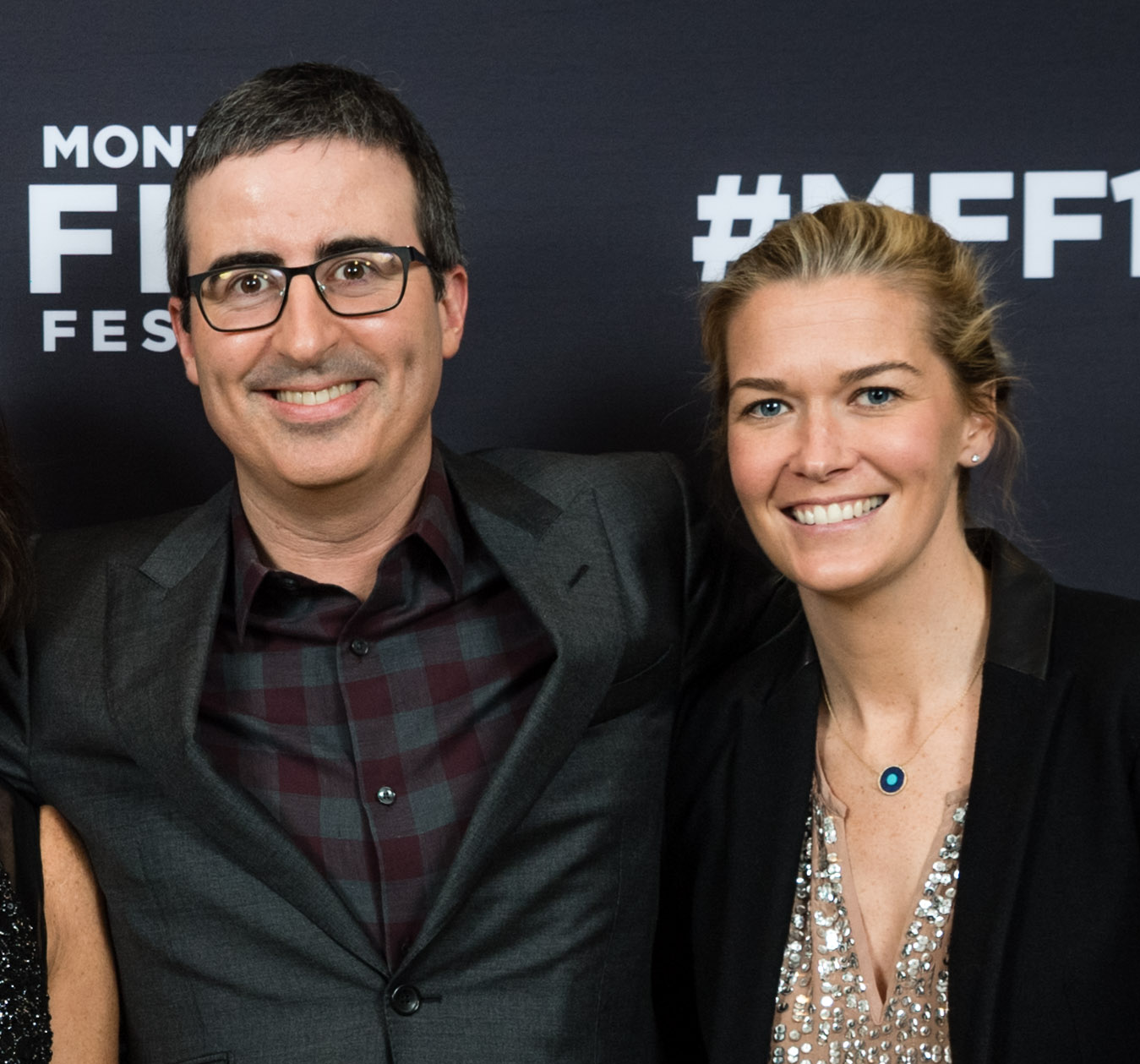
Oliver with Norley at Montclair Film Festival in 2016

Oliver met Kate Norley, an Iraq War veteran who served as a medic in the U.S. Army's 1st Cavalry Division, at the 2008 Republican National Convention; he was reporting for The Daily Show and she was campaigning with Vets for Freedom, then led by Pete Hegseth. She and other veterans hid Oliver, the other correspondents, and the camera crew from security. The two were married in October 2011 and reside in New York City. They have two sons, one born prematurely in 2015 and the other born in 2018. Oliver occasionally wears a 1st Cavalry Division lapel pin in honour of Norley.

Oliver's immigration status when he joined The Daily Show in 2006 placed certain constraints on what he could do in the United States, but also provided him with comedy material as he poked fun at the opacity and occasional absurdity of the process of obtaining US residency. During the 2007–08 Writers Guild of America strike, which temporarily stopped production of The Daily Show, Oliver participated in picketing protests; he appeared on the show upon its resuming production on 7 January 2008. During a sketch, he pointed out that he was then in America on a visitor visa that requires him not to strike while the show is in production, as violation of the terms of the visa would be grounds for deportation.

In an episode of The Bugle released on 2 November 2009 and recorded three days earlier, Oliver announced that he was approved for his US green card, noting that now he can "get arrested filming bits for The Daily Show". Oliver says he was given a scare while applying at the US embassy in London when an immigration officer asked, "Give me one good reason I should let you back in to insult my country" before following up with, "Oh, I'm just kidding, I love the show." Since then, he has referred to Americans as "us" or "you" based on what each segment has demanded. Oliver was naturalized as a US citizen on 13 December 2019. Since moving to the United States, he has been a fan of the New York Mets. He has said that being a New York Yankees fan would be the "wrong thing to do morally".

Oliver's philanthropy includes an on-air giveaway in which he forgave over $15 million of medical debt owed by over 9,000 people. He purchased the debt for $60,000 and forgave it on his show on 4 June 2016.

== Filmography ==
=== Film ===
Year	Title	Role	Notes	Ref(s)
2008	The Love Guru	Dick Pants		
2011	Moves: The Rise and Rise of the New Pornographers	Protest Leader	Short film	
2011	The Smurfs	Vanity Smurf	Voice	
2013	The Smurfs 2	Vanity Smurf	Voice	
2013	The Smurfs: The Legend of Smurfy Hollow	Vanity Smurf	Short film	
2019	Wonder Park	Steve	Voice	
2019	The Lion King	Zazu	Voice	

=== Television ===
Year	Title	Role	Notes	Ref(s)
1985	Bleak House	Felix Pardiggle	Episode: "1.2"	
2001	People Like Us	Bank Manager	Episode: "The Bank Manager"	
2001	My Hero	Man from BBC	Episode: "Pregnant"	
2003	Gash	Himself		
2004	Green Wing	Car Salesman	Episode: "Caroline's First Day"	
2005	The Comic Side of 7 Days	Himself	6 episodes	
2005–2006	Mock the Week	Panelist	7 episodes	
2006–2013	The Daily Show with Jon Stewart	Himself	Correspondent: 2006–2013 (356 episodes); Host: 2013 (32 episodes); Also writer: 2007–2013 (962 episodes)	
2008	John Oliver: Terrifying Times	Himself	Stand-up special	
2009	Important Things with Demetri Martin	Various roles	2 episodes	
2009–2011; 2014	Community	Dr Ian Duncan	18 episodes	
2010	Rally to Restore Sanity and/or Fear	Peter Pan	TV special; also writer	
2010–2013	John Oliver's New York Stand-Up Show	Himself (host)	26 episodes; also creator, writer, executive producer	
2012	Gravity Falls	Wax Sherlock Holmes	Voice; episode: "Headhunters"	
2012–2013	Randy Cunningham: 9th Grade Ninja	Coach Green	Voice; 4 episodes	
2013	Rick and Morty	Xenon Bloom	Voice; episode: "Anatomy Park"	
2014	The Simpsons	Booth Wilkes-John	Voice; episode: "Pay Pal"	
2014	Robot Chicken	Serpentor, British Gentleman	Voice; episode: "G.I. Jogurt"	
2014–present	Last Week Tonight with John Oliver	Himself (host)	Also creator, writer, executive producer	
2016	Comedians in Cars Getting Coffee	Himself (guest)	Episode: "What Kind of Human Animal Would Do This?"	
2016–2017	Danger Mouse	Augustus P. Crumhorn IV	Voice; 4 episodes	
2017; 2025	Bob's Burgers	Ian Amberson	Voice; 2 episodes	
2018–2019	Wyatt Cenac's Problem Areas	none	20 episodes; executive producer	
2020	Big Mouth	Harry	Voice; 3 episodes	
2022	The Horne Section TV Show	Himself	6 episodes	
2022	Helpsters	Himself	Episode: "Weather-Loving Winston / Veterinarians Vera and Vinnie"	
2025	Love, Death & Robots	Thumb Bringer	Voice; episode: "The Other Large Thing"	
2026	General Hospital	Z	3 episodes	
2026	Days of Our Lives	Devlin St. John	3 episodes	

== Awards and nominations ==
Oliver won three Primetime Emmy Awards, one WGA Award, and one Grammy Award for his work at The Daily Show. For Last Week Tonight, he has received twenty Emmy Awards, two Peabody Awards, eight PGA Awards, and six WGA Awards. Oliver has also received nominations for his writing on the Rally to Restore Sanity and/or Fear and for hosting Last Week Tonight. In 2021, Oliver received the Great Immigrants Award from the Carnegie Corporation of New York.

== Published works ==
- Earth (The Book): A Visitor's Guide to the Human Race. New York: Grand Central Publishing. 2010. ISBN 978-0-446-57922-3.
