= Glenn Wool =

Canadian stand-up comedian

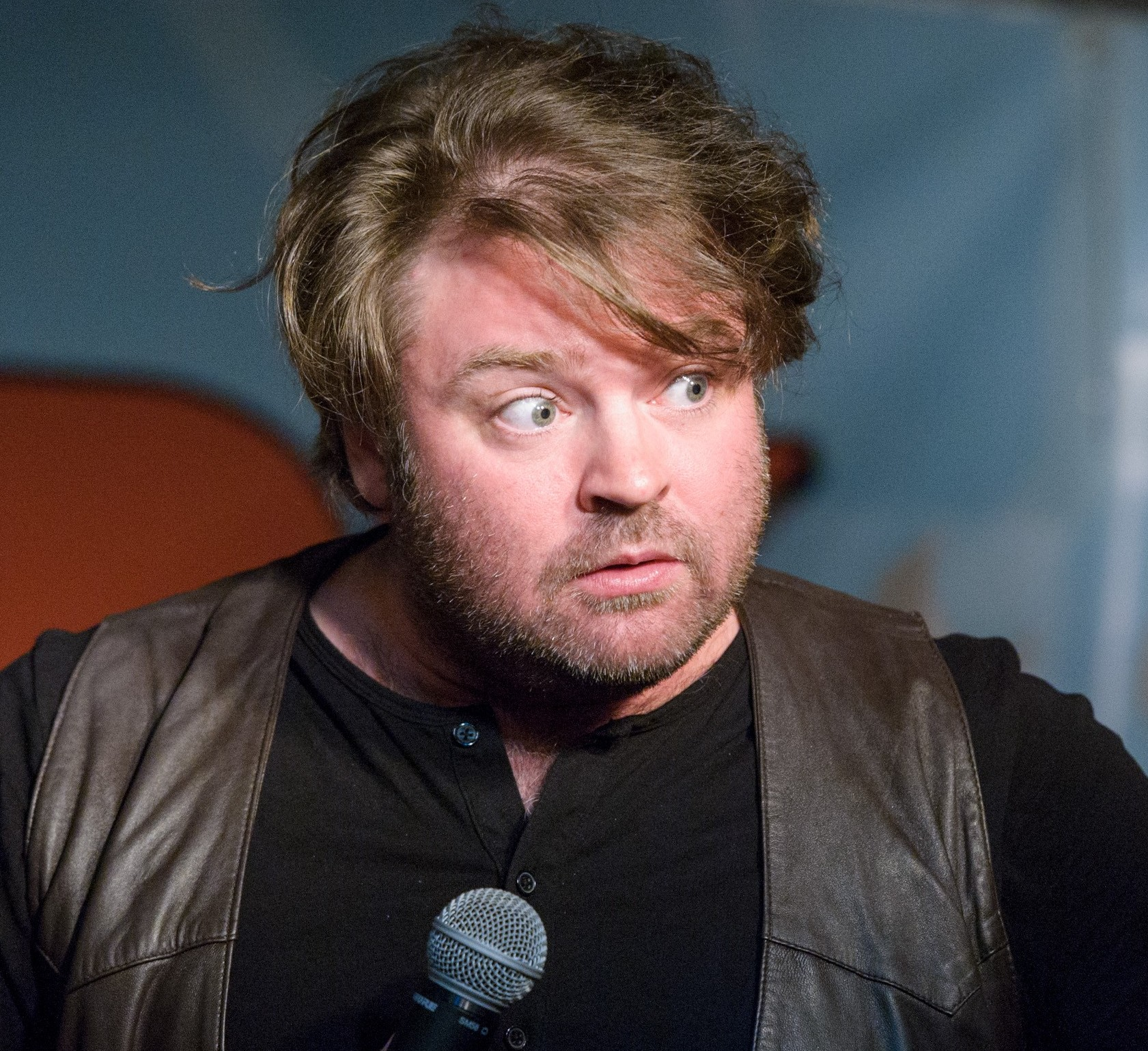
- Wool in 2016
- Born: September 16, 1974 (age 51)
- Occupation: Stand-up comedian
- Years active: 1995-present
- Website: glennwool.com

Glenn Wool is a Canadian stand-up comedian based in England. He has released six albums, including 2020's Viva Forever, produced by Dan Schlissel for Stand Up! Records.

== Early life ==
His father, who was Estonian, escaped a concentration camp in Sweden after World War II by helping steal a minesweeper and sailing it to Ireland. The family eventually emigrated to Canada, changing its name from the Estonian "Vool" to "Wool." Wool's father became a policeman in Toronto, where his investigation of a fraud case involving novelist Jeffrey Archer led Archer to base a character on Wool's father in his first book, Not A Penny More, Not A Penny Less.

Wool grew up in various Canadian cities including Toronto and Vancouver, as well as the British Columbia cities of Langley and White Rock, where he went to Earl Marriott Secondary School. He discovered comedy at age 12 after seeing a Bill Cosby live stand-up appearance.

== Career ==
=== Stand-up comedy ===
Wool performing for an audience of children in 2011

Wool's combination of intelligent political comedy and burly Canadian demeanour has been described as "hoser savant." He began his comedy career in Vancouver in 1995, at age 19. He moved to London at age 22, where he quickly established himself in the city's comedy scene. He has appeared on many British comedy and panel shows, including 8 Out of 10 Cats, Russell Howard's Good News, The John Bishop Show, Never Mind The Buzzcocks, 28 Acts in 28 Minutes, Comedy Cuts, Comedy Central UK's "The Alternative Comedy Experience", and radio programs such as Political Animal as well as Live at Gotham and John Oliver's New York Stand-Up Show on Comedy Central and Showtime's The Green Room with Paul Provenza.

He is a frequent performer at large music festivals such as Glastonbury. He has also performed more than 17 times at the Edinburgh Festival Fringe, where his shows have typically been well-reviewed. Gareth Newnham of the Weston & Somerset Mercury, reviewing Wool's Wools Gold II: The Iron Pirate, praised his "perfect comic-timing and delivery, a combination of stoner drawl and fire-brand Southern preacher which snaps back and forth at almost a drop of a hat," and Wool's "ability to take a joke and then push it to the darkest place he possibly can." Wool also hosted the 2016 show Before the Morning After, featuring comics filmed in a diner at the 2015 Edinburgh Fringe, for the NBC streaming service Seeso.

Wool has toured the world extensively, telling one interviewer that he once circled the globe three times in two weeks, becoming so jet-lagged that he forgot what city he was in. In 2014, Wool was part of a team of comics that planned to set a world record for the world's highest stand-up concert by climbing Mount Everest, but was forced to pull out after delays.

He has toured with Doug Stanhope, and appeared on Stanhope's 2017 group album/video Comedians' Comedian's Comedians, which reached No. 12 on the Billboard Comedy chart. He has been a member of Canadian musical comedy group The Lumberjacks with Stuart Francis and Craig Campbell.

Wool is the voice of the title character in the Cartoon Hangover 2018 miniseries Slug Riot. He also voiced the character Hunter in the animated Disney XD short Lottie Bearshout: Good as Goaled, which won a BAFTA Children's Award in 2016.

In 2004, he wrote and starred in "What’s The Story?", an episode of Channel 4's experimental series Comedy Lab.

Wool co-hosts the podcast Freestyle with comedian Frankie Boyle.

=== Albums ===
Wool has released seven albums on Stand Up! Records, all produced by Grammy winner Dan Schlissel. Derek Riggs, who designed Iron Maiden's albums, did the cover for Wool's No Land's Man. Befitting Wool's wide-traveling career, several albums were recorded in far-flung locations: I'll Ask Her was recorded in Alaska, with a title that puns on the state's name, and Creator, I Am But a Pawn was recorded in Tallinn, Estonia.

== Awards and nominations ==
Wool won the Best of Fest award for his 2010 appearance at the Sydney Comedy Festival. He was nominated in the Best Headliner category at the Chortle Awards in 2008, and Best International Stand Up at the 2003 New Zealand Comedy Awards.

== Discography ==
- Let Your Hands Go (Stand Up! Records, 2010)
- I’ll Ask Her (Stand Up! Records, 2012)
- No Lands Man (Stand Up! Records, 2014)
- This Road Has Tolls (Stand Up! Records, 2017)
- Creator, I Am But a Pawn (Stand Up! Records, 2019)
- Viva Forever (Stand Up! Records, 2020)
- Tiny Kings of Winter (Stand Up! Records, 2023)

== Personal life ==
Wool is divorced and remarried. Wool and his wife live in England and have a son.
