= Comedy Cuts =

- Country of origin: United Kingdom

Production
- Running time: 30-60 minutes

Original release
- Network: ITV2
- Release: 2007 – 2008

Comedy Cuts is a comedy programme on the British TV channel ITV2 that aims to provide an opportunity for new comedy performers to present their talents. Featuring 40 performers demonstrating a mix of stand up and sketches, the series is shot entirely on location. Each act is taken out into the world and situated somewhere which echoes their individual style.

Series 3 went into production in 2008 but has yet to be broadcast.

== Performers ==
- Tim Minchin
- Katy Brand
- Ed Byrne
- Tony Law
- Mark Watson
- Glenn Wool
- Howard Read
- Gary Le Strange
- Brendon Burns
- Steve Hughes
- Simon Munnery
- Robin Ince
- Lucy Porter
- Matt Kirshen
- Phil Nicol
- Andrew Lawrence
- Jim Jefferies
- Rhod Gilbert
- Nick Doody
- Count Arthur Strong
