= The Department =

BBC Radio 4 comedy series

The Department is a satirical comedy on BBC Radio 4 about a secret organization with the power to influence every aspect of your life.

The show is written and performed by Chris Addison, John Oliver and Andy Zaltzman (cancelled after the third series which was written only by Oliver and Zaltzman, after Addison concentrated on his first book), with Peter Dickson, Matthew Holness and Lucy Montgomery. Addison, Oliver and Zaltzman star as Research Team 32, an eccentric three-man think-tank with the brief to brainstorm new ideas on solving society's problems.

== Characters ==
- Oscar Proud (Chris Addison) - Team 32's team leader and historian. Very patriotic and nostalgic for the time of the British Empire, but generally moral.
- Victor Gooch (John Oliver) - Team 32's lawyer. Ruthless and cheerfully amoral.
- Lazlo Wolfe (Andy Zaltzman) - Team 32's scientist. Deeply in love with 'Wendy'.
- Keith Bilk (Matthew Holness) - Undersecretary to the Department Committee. Very organised, fit, talented and obnoxious. Despises Team 32.
- "Tony" - A Department canteen worker, although also seen working in security. Also despises Team 32, especially Victor.

== Episodes ==
=== Series 1 (2004) ===
No. overall	No. in series	Title	Original release date
1	1	"Education"	7 January 2004
2	2	"Public Transportation"	14 January 2004
3	3	"The Army"	21 January 2004

=== Series 2 (2005) ===
No. overall	No. in series	Title	Original release date
4	1	"Crime and Punishment"	12 July 2005
5	2	"Democracy"	19 July 2005
6	3	"The Environment"	26 July 2005
7	4	"Europe"	2 August 2005
8	5	"Health"	9 August 2005

=== Series 3 (2006) ===
No. overall	No. in series	Title	Original release date
9	1	"Tax and Public Spending"	2 August 2006
10	2	"Terrorism"	9 August 2006
This episode was postponed from 16 August 2005.
11	3	"Trade"	16 August 2006
12	4	"Immigration"	23 August 2006
13	5	"Science and Technology"	30 August 2006
14	6	"Making Britain Great Again"	6 September 2006
