= Edinburgh Festival Fringe 2003 =

Performing arts festival in Edinburgh, Scotland

The 2003 Edinburgh Festival Fringe was the 56th Edinburgh Festival Fringe. The Fringe ran from 3–25 August 2003 and presented 1541 shows over 207 venues. 2003 was the first year that over one million tickets were sold at the Fringe.

== Venues ==
The Pod, a 400-seater theatre on Festival Square, was erected for the first time and hosted acts including Daniel Kitson, Tommy Tiernan and Danny Bhoy

The Spiegeltent moved to a new location on George Square Gardens, to where it has returned each year since.

Unusual venues at the 2003 Fringe included a public toilet, a bus and a lift.

== Awards ==
=== Comedy ===
==== Perrier Comedy Awards ====
Perrier Comedy Award

Winner:

- Demetri Martin – If I

Nominees:

- Adam Hills – Cut Loose
- Flight of the Conchords – High on Folk
- Howard Read – The Big Howard and Little Howard Show
- Reginald D. Hunter – White Woman

Best Newcomer Award

Winner:

- Gary Le Strange Polaroid Suitcase – (with Waen Shepherd)

Nominees:

- Alex Horne – Making Fish Laugh (with Tim Key)
- Miles Jupp – Gentlemen Prefer Brogues
- Michael McIntyre

==== So You Think You're Funny? ====
- Tom Wrigglesworth

==== BBC New Comedy Award ====
- Rhod Gilbert

=== Theatre ===
==== Scotsman Fringe First Awards ====
- Pandora 88 (Fabrik)
- Those Eyes, That Mouth (Grid Iron Theatre Company)
- Pugilist Specialist (The Riot Group)
- The People Next Door (Traverse Theatre Company)
- Boy Steals Train (78th Street Theatre Lab)
- NE 2nd Avenue (Teo Castellanos)
- Pickle (Indian ink)
- Baby Jane: Show Number 113 (The People Show)
- The Birds of Sarajevo (Théâtre de la Fenêtre)
- The Echo Chamber (en masse theatre)
- Love, Sex and Cider (Royal Scottish Academy of Music and Drama)
- Thebans (Theatre Babel)
- White Cabin (Akhe Group)
- Ladies and Gents (Semper Fi)
- A Very Naughty Boy (VSM)
