= Edinburgh Festival Fringe 2006 =

Performing arts festival in Edinburgh, Scotland

The 2006 Edinburgh Festival Fringe was the 59th Edinburgh Festival Fringe.

== Events ==
2006 was the first Fringe following the introduction of the new legislation banning smoking indoors. During a photocall at the Assembly Rooms for a play in which he was playing Winston Churchill, the actor Mel Smith lit a cigar, flouting the ban. Controversy arose when Smith insisted he would smoke onstage during the first performance - he did not go through with this claim.

== Venues ==
2006 was the first year that the udderBELLY, an offshoot of the Underbelly venues in the shape of an upside-down purple cow, was erected on Bristo Square.
