= Beef and Dairy Network Podcast =

British comedy podcast

Beef And Dairy Network Podcast
- Genre: Surrealism; deadpan
- Language: English

Creative team
- Created by: Benjamin Partridge

Production
- Length: 10–60 minutes

Publication
- No. of episodes: 129 (as of 22 December 2025)
- Original release: July 2015

Reception
- Ratings: 4.794117647058823/5, 4.815789473684211/5

Related
- Website: www.beefanddairynetwork.com

Beef and Dairy Network Podcast is a monthly comedy podcast, which began in July 2015. It is written, produced, and hosted by comedian Benjamin Partridge, who plays the host of a fictional industry podcast for the beef and dairy industries.

In 2016, the podcast joined the Maximum Fun podcast network.

In 2017 and 2018, ten episodes were acquired for broadcast by BBC Radio 4, which was notable as the first time that the station had bought the repeat rights for an existing podcast.

== Format ==
=== Podcast ===
It describes itself as "the number one podcast for those involved, or just interested, in the production of beef animals and dairy herds" and consists of fictional interviews, spoof adverts, fictional letters from listeners, and documentary features. The show is a surrealist comedy played straight, and features a number of ongoing storylines, such as the search for (and government cover-up of) a "fifth meat" and the many ventures of disgraced slaughterhouse owner Eli Roberts.

=== Live show ===
There have been live show versions of the podcast, at Kings Place in London in 2016, 2017 and annually since 2021, as well as in 2019 at London's Southbank Centre.

== Guests ==
Partridge is joined by different guests each month, playing various characters from the beef and dairy industries. Guests have included Nick Offerman, Greg Davies, Josie Long, Henry Paker, Andy Daly, Kevin Eldon, Mike Wozniak, Katy Wix, Paul F. Tompkins and the actor Ted Danson.

== Reception ==
The Guardian named it one of the top 50 best podcasts of 2016, and also as one of the top 50 comedy podcasts of 2021. The Observer called it a "lovely, funny show." The Daily Telegraph wrote, "It's the ramrod straight delivery that makes The Beef and Dairy Network Podcast by far the best audio comedy around". The A.V. Club wrote "When dealing with the absurd, few things help heighten comedy quite like commitment, something that Beef And Dairy does better than most."

Gilly Smith called the podcast a "cult classic" in a book about starting podcasting.

The podcast won Best Comedy at the British Podcast Awards in 2017 and 2018. As of 2024, The Beef and Dairy Network's unofficial Facebook group has over 1500 members, despite the fact that it claims to be the world's hardest podcast fan club to join. Facebook group candidates must answer questions about the series, and then submit a video of them mooing in time to music, to check they are not a "5th Meater".

== Episodes ==
Episode	Episode title	Date	Cast
1	David Pin	22 July 2015	Mike Wozniak
2	A Tribute To Paul Kitesworthy	27 August 2015	Nadia Kamil, Mike Wozniak, Jack Bernhardt, Gareth Gwynn, Sian Harries, Henry Paker and Mike Bubbins
3	Gareth Belge	24 September 2015	Henry Paker
4	Eli Roberts	21 October 2015	Mike Bubbins
5	Dustin France	22 November 2015	Mike Wozniak
6	The Cumberfeld Cow Disaster & Paul Paul	22 December 2015	Rhodri Viney, Richard Elfyn, Katy Wix, Sara Lloyd-Gregory, Mike Wozniak, Tom Crowley, Henry Paker, Katie Storey and Melangell Dolma
7	Yoghurt Special	24 January 2016	Katy Wix, Tom Neenan and Mike Wozniak
8	Eli Roberts Investigation	21 February 2016	Ed Gamble and Mike Bubbins
9	Teresa Beckton	19 April 2016	Josie Long and Cariad Lloyd
10	Gina Craig	24 April 2016	Tom Neenan, Celia Pacquola, Nadia Kamil and David Mark
11	Cliff Trent-Roberts	22 May 2016	Mike Wozniak
12	Timothy Van Lindqvist & Paul Paul	19 June 2016	Tom Crowley and Rhodri Viney
13	Rio Special	25 July 2016	Miles Jupp, Helen Zaltzman, Mariana Maioline, Felipe Galvao, Vanessa Del Negri, Regina Souza, Marina De Menezes and Marcellus Lima
14	A Matter Of Life And Death	21 August 2016	Gemma Arrowsmith, Mike Wozniak, Tom Crowley, Nadia Kamil
15	Eli Roberts Goes Legit	27 September 2016	Mike Bubbins, Sarah Morgan, Tonya Prewitt, Randall Cooper, Jamie Bradley, James Garrison, Nathaniel Metcalfe and Fred Nickl
16	Live At The London Agriculture Festival	23 October 2016	Mike Wozniak, Josie Long and Martin Austwick
17	Boffo's Cow Circus	20 November 2016	Greg Davies, Tom Crowley, Max Davis, Catherine Paskell, Tom Neenan, Lloyd Langford, Elis James, Gareth Gwynn, Alex Adey and Sian Harries
18	Munich Special	18 December 2016	Daniel Rigby, Jessica Ransom, Mike Wozniak and Nadia Kamil
19	Michael Banyan	22 January 2017	Henry Paker
20	Lamb Investigation Special	19 February 2017	Rose Matafeo, Tom Neenan, Jesse Thorn, Tom Crowley and Nigel Crowle
21	The Church Of Eli	20 March 2017	Ed Gamble, Mike Bubbins and John Rutledge
22	Michael "Frank" Franklinson	23 April 2017	Mike Wilmot and Mike Wozniak
23	75th Anniversary Special	21 May 2017	Gareth Gwynn, Nadia Kamil, Tom Crowley, Molly Beth White, Tom Neenan and Sarah Thom, Mike Bubbins and Hal Lublin
24	Wendy Axminster	20 June 2017	Katy Wix and Dave Cribb
25	Les Cheese's Heart	23 July 2017	Tom Neenan and Tom Crowley
26	Michael Banyan In Exile	20 August 2017	Henry Paker and Theresa Thorn
27	Live At The British Beefmen's Luncheon	24 September 2017	Mike Wozniak, Nadia Kamil, Henry Paker and Dave Cribb
28	Roy Gluck Jr.	22 October 2017	Andy Daly
29	Professor Colin Plenty	19 November 2017	Kevin Eldon
30	Phillip Mushroom	18 December 2017	Daniel Rigby, Rhodri Viney
31	Redeeming Eli, Part 1	21 January 2018	Mike Bubbins, Melangell Dolma, Chris Corcoran, Nadia Kamil, Rhodri Vine
32	Redeeming Eli, Part 2	25 February 2018	Mike Bubbins, Ed Gamble, Mike Wozniak, Gemma Arrowsmith, Tom Crowley, Sian Harries, Tom Neenan, Rhodri Viney
33	Redeeming Eli, Part 3	5 April 2018	Mike Bubbins
34	Lucy Bonham	23 April 2018	Celeste Dring
35	Professor James Harcombe	20 May 2018	Mike Shephard
36	Beef Encounters	17 June 2018	Cariad Lloyd, Mike Wozniak, Elis James
37	Lamb Therapy	22 July 2018	Rachel Parris, Shivani Thussu, Tom Neenan, Nigel Crowle
38	Rev Hillary Block	19 August 2018	Matthew Crosby, Gemma Arrowsmith, Tom Crowley
39	Live At London Agrimedia Con 2018	23 September 2018	Dave Cribb, Mike Wozniak, Nadia Kamil, Tawny Newsome
40	Beef Call	21 October 2018	Max Davis, Shivani Thussu, Anna Leong Brophy, Mike Wozniak
41	Beefy Boy	18 November 2018	Matt Lees, Gareth Gwynn
42	The Ballad Of Parsnip Flendercroft	17 December 2018	Freya Parker, Mike Wozniak, Max Davis, Jenny Laville, Henry Paker, Mike Shephard, Tom Crowley, Gemma Arrowsmith
43	Bunny Stone	20 January 2019	London Hughes
44	Michael Banyan Comes Home	17 February 2019	Henry Paker, Lucy Farrett, Mike Wozniak
45	Buying A Bull	22 March 2019	Freya Parker, Daniel Rigby
46	Eli Roberts In Korea	21 April 2019	Mike Bubbins, Ed Gamble
47	Too Much Milk?	19 May 2019	Jake Yapp, Amy Gledhill, Tom Neenan
48	Maureen Andrews	23 June 2019	Christine Nangle
49	The Beef Hop	21 July 2019	Josie Long, Sophie Duker
50	Your Host's Fiftieth Episode	18 August 2019	Mike Wozniak, Tom Crowley, Sian Harries
51	Live At The European Barn Doors And Gates Expo	22 September 2019	Dave Cribb, Mike Wozniak, Nadia Kamil, Mike Bubbins
52	Tusk Henderson	21 October 2019	Nick Offerman
53	Lesley Clocks	18 November 2019	Freya Parker, Sarah Dempster, Moujan Zolfaghari, Nick Wiger, Heather Campbell, Jake Yapp, Mike Wozniak, Henry Paker, Gemma Arrowsmith, Cromerty York, Tom Crowley, Elis James, Nathaniel Metcalfe, Clarissa Maycock
54	Beefhead Day	18 December 2019	Mike Shephard, Kat Sadler, Catherine Brinkworth, Max Davis, Tom Crowley, Rhodri Viney, Eugene Capper
55	Bob Trescothick	19 January 2020	Mike Wozniak, Elis James, Henry Paker
56	The End Of The World	16 February 2020	Heather Anne Campbell, Nick Wiger, Sarah Campbell, Moujan Zolfaghari, Jordan Morris, Tom Neenan, Tom Crowley
57	Introducing... Bimpsie!	22 March 2020	Jason Mantzoukas, Natasha Hodgson, Jesse Thorn, Lucy Farrett, Tim Bick
58	Organic Farming	20 April 2020	Humphrey Ker, Margaret Cabourn-Smith, Henry Paker, Tom Crowley, Gemma Arrowsmith, Tim Bick
59	New Beef Call Number	25 May 2020	Mike Wozniak, Rhodri Viney, Dave Cribb, Charlie Hopkinson, Tim Bick, Nadia Kamil, Gemma Arrowsmith, Tom Crowley, Sammy Graham
60	Tilly and Davey	25 June 2020	Isy Suttie, Emily Lloyd-Saini, Anna Leong Brophy
61	International Beef Library	20 July 2020	Gareth Gwynn, Mike Wozniak, Gemma Arrowsmith, Tom Crowley, Tim Bick, Pernille Haaland, Linnea Sage
62	The Baritones	26 August 2020	Amy Gledhill, Chris Cantrill, Sean Morley, Tom Burgess, Jain Edwards, Nicola Redman, Natasha Hodgson
63	Michael Banyan, Podcaster	22 September 2020	Henry Paker, Hal Lublin, Angela Sullivan
64	Goodbye Bimpsie	19 October 2020	Natasha Hodgson, Henry Widdicombe, Tom Crowley, Mike Wozniak, Lucy Farrett, Tim Bick, Hal Lublin
65	Exotic Seeds Breeding Paddock	23 November 2020	Marek Larwood, Mike Wozniak, Matthew Crosby, Clarissa Maycock, Tom Crowley
66	Beefhead Ball	21 December 2020	Tom Parry, Mike Wozniak, Catherine Brinkworth, Nadia Kamil and Rob Gilroy
67	Milking Machine Misadventures	25 January 2021	Natasha Hodgson, Cariad Lloyd, Tom Neenan, Mike Wozniak, Linus Karp, Tim Bick
68	Eli Returns	22 February 2021	Mike Bubbins, Priya Hall, Chris Corcoran, Tom Crowley
69	Field Hour	22 March 2021	Amy Hoggart, Tom Crowley, Tom Neenan
70	Hogball	19 April 2021	Miles Jupp, Mike Wozniak, Greig Johnson
71	Bovine TB	6 May 2021	Lloyd Langford, Monica Gaga, Chris Cantrill, Nic Redman
72	Paul Bowfin	20 June 2021	Adam Courting, Gemma Arrowsmith, Tom Crowley, Stefan Ashton Frank, Hal Lublin, Linnea Sage, Mike Wozniak, Dave Cribb
73	Kenny Baritone	19 July 2021	Chris Cantrill
74	Beef Fishing	22 August 2021	Neil Delamere, Katie Elin-Salt, Tom Burgess, Chris Cantrill, Elis James, Lotte Betts-Dean
75	Live At The Great British Cattle Bazaar	20 September 2021	Mike Wozniak, Henry Paker, Nadia Kamil, Sammy Graham, Dave Cribb
76	Angela Baker	21 October 2021	Janet Varney, Ify Nwadiwe
77	Marianne Angler	22 November 2021	Nadia Kamil, Nigel Crowle, Tom Crowley, Clarissa Maycock, Mark Turetsky
78	Beef Security	20 December 2021	Mike Bubbins, Tom Bell, Amy Mason and Alasdair Satchel
79	The Phosphorus Brothers	24 January 2022	Sunil Patel, Henry Paker, Karólína Vigdís, Louise Robb and Hester L.C.
80	World Beef Bulletin	21 February 2022	Linnea Sage, Tom Crowley, Gemma Arrowsmith, Tom Neenan, Rajiv Karia, Tim Bick, Hendrikje Alexis, Holly Watson and Madeleine Brettingham
81	Hidden Beef: The Historic Cryptocurrency of the Future	20 March 2022	Mike Shephard and Tom Crowley
82	Banyan: The Defacening, Part 1	25 April 2022	Mike Wozniak and Henry Paker
83	Banyan: The Defacening, Part 2 – The Refacening	3 May 2022	Mike Wozniak, Henry Paker and Tom Crowley
84	The Lord Of The Sun	22 May 2022	Stefan Ashton Frank, Rose Johnson and Susan Harrison
85	Medical Mythbusters	19 June 2022	Tom Neenan
86	Debbie Cook	24 July 2022	Lola-Rose Maxwell, Clarissa Maycock and Mike Wozniak
87	Squandered Inheritance	21 August 2022	Tom Crowley, Gemma Arrowsmith and Maggie Nolan
88	Live at Tanya and Barry’s Wedding	25 September 2022	Linnea Sage, Tom Crowley, Mike Wozniak, Henry Paker and Nadia Kamil
89	Paula York	23 October 2022	Stevie Martin
90	Beef Information Centre	20 November 2022	Josie Long, Rob Gilroy, Simon Alcock, Gemma Arrowsmith and Julisa
91	Beefhead with Kenny and Yvonne	18 December 2022	Chris Cantrill, Amy Gledhill and Tom Crowley
92	Pam Onion	22 January 2023	Beth Eyre and Dan Thomas
93	Artificial Intelligence	19 February 2023	Susan Harrison, Graham Dickson and George Foreacres
94	Dafydd, Part 1	19 March 2023	Mike Bubbins and Ed Gamble
95	Dafydd, Part 2	27 March 2023	Mike Bubbins and Ed Gamble
96	National Beef Lottery	23 April 2023	Lorna Rose Treen, Tom Parry, Mike Wozniak and Tom Crowley
97	Len Biro	21 May 2023	John Rutledge
98	Hogball Goes Professional	18 June 2023	John-Luke Roberts, Miles Jupp and Greig Johnson
99	The Man-At-Beef	23 July 2023	Paul F. Tompkins, Mike Shephard and Max Davis
100	Your Host’s Hundredth Episode	20 August 2023	Mike Wozniak, Susan Harrison, Tom Crowley, Gemma Arrowsmith and Lucy Farrett
101	Live At London Agrimedia Con 2023	24 September 2023	Chris Cantrill, Amy Gledhill, Anna Leong Brophy, Tom Crowley, Tom Neenan, Nadia Kamil, Mike Wozniak and Linnea Sage
102	Gregory Johnston	22 October 2023	Bilal Zafar and Esyllt Sears
103	The Beef Brigade	19 November 2023	John-Luke Roberts, Mike Shephard, Mike Wozniak, Henry Paker, Louise Robb and Linnea Sage
104	Beefhead Drinks	17 December 2023	Mike Wozniak and Susan Harrison
105	Cattle College	21 January 2024	Beth Granville, Linnea Sage, Mike Shephard, Gareth Gwynn, Madi Savage and Matt Apodaca
106	Gary “Fiesta” Lewis	18 February 2024	Tom Ward
107	Nicholas Summers	18 March 2024	Cody Dahler and Tom Neenan
108	Beef Call Update	24 March 2024	Sammy Dobson, Mike Wozniak, Max Davis, Tom Crowley, Gemma Arrowsmith and Cameron Smith
109	Ted Danson	21 April 2024	Ted Danson, Susan Harrison, David Reed, Natasha Hodgson, Mark Turetsky and Linnea Sage
110	Barry Mizon	19 May 2024	Marek Larwood, Tom Crowley and Linnea Sage
111	Shaving	24 June 2024	Mike Wozniak, Linnea Sage and Tom Neenan
112	Dean Lamp	28 July 2024	Dan Thomas, Gemma Arrowsmith and Tom Crowley
113	Agnes	25 August 2024	Sammy Dobson and Antonis Vlavo
114	Live At London Livestock Dietary Supplements Con 2024	22 September 2024	Henry Paker, Tom Crowley, Linnea Sage, Lucy Farrett, Gemma Arrowsmith and Mike Wozniak
115	Milky Man	29 October 2024	Natasha Hodgson, Stevie Martin, Amy Gledhill and Daniel Rigby
116	Catchphrase	17 November 2024	Matthew Crosby, Tom Burgess, Gemma Arrowsmith and Linnea Sage
117	Beef 2024	22 December 2024	Jessica Ransom, George Foreacres, Michael Clarke, Henry Paker, Mike Wozniak and Linnea Sage
118	The Oldest Milkman In The World	30 January 2025	John Rutledge
119	Jerry’s Wood Roasted Shelf Stable Deep Fill Hot Pies	25 February 2025	Matt Apodaca and Tom Neenan
120	Billy Whizzbang	16 March 2025	Mike Shephard, Gemma Arrowsmith, Mike Wozniak, Tom Crowley, Gareth Gwynn and Linnea Sage
121	Lead and Beef	27 April 2025	Cody Dahler
122	The Great Big British Toddler Teardown Live	19 May 2025	Chris Cantrill, Greig Johnson, Amy Gledhill, Rob Gilroy and Amy Mason
123	Jacobinius Arse Syndrome	27 June 2025	Mike Wozniak, Mike Shephard, Tom Crowley and Linnea Sage
124	Your Host's Tenth Anniversary	20 July 2025	Mike Wozniak, Tom Neenan, Susan Harrison, Gemma Arrowsmith and Linnea Sage
125	Goodbye Jacobinius Arse	25 August 2025	Mike Wozniak, Cody Dahler, Tom Crowley and Linnea Sage
126	A Live Commemoration Of The Third Anniversary Of The Death Of Queen Elizabeth II	22 September 2025	Mike Shephard, Susan Harrison, Sammy Dobson, Tom Crowley, Linnea Sage and Mike Wozniak
127	Beef Pie	30 October 2025	Tom Crowley, Anna Leong Brophy, Gemma Arrowsmith, Sammy Dobson, Cody Dahler, Gareth Gwynn
128	Dean Lamp Goes Undercover	27 November 2025	Dan Thomas

=== Special episodes ===
Episode title	Date	Cast
Ask A Vet	29 July 2020	Mike Wozniak
Jumanjaniacs Episode 2752	11 May 2021	Nick Wiger, Heather Anne Campbell and Matt Apodaca
Jumanji: CWS – Episode 950	24 March 2025	Henry Paker and Tom Crowley
