= Gareth Gwynn =

Welsh comedy writer, performer and radio presenter

Gareth Gwynn is a comedy writer, performer and radio presenter. He is the co-writer of the television sitcoms Bull and Tourist Trap and the radio sitcoms Ankle Tag, Passing On and Social Club FM.

== Career ==
=== Writing ===
Gwynn began his career in 2007 writing for BBC Radio 4 on Listen Against and continued to do so until 2011. Between 2008-9, Gwynn wrote for shows on BBC Radio 4 and BBC Radio 7 including Look Away Now, I Guess That's Why They Call It The News and Newsjack. In 2009 he became a recipient of the BBC Radio Comedy Writers Bursary. For BBC Radio 4 he writes for The Now Show and The News Quiz and for BBC Radio Wales he is a writer for the sketch shows Elis James' Pantheon of Heroes, Here Be Dragons and Welcome Strangers.

Since 2010, Gwynn has continued to write for radio but expanded into television too including The Armstrong & Miller Show, Have I Got News For You, O'r Diwedd and Top Gear.

His sitcom work includes writing Passing On, Ministry Of Happiness and co-writing Social Club FM for BBC Radio Wales, co-writing Bull with comedy writer John-Luke Roberts for Gold and co-writing Ankle Tag with Benjamin Partridge for BBC Radio 4. Together with Sian Harries and Tudur Owen, he is part of the writing team for the semi-improvised show Tourist Trap for BBC One Wales. He has also contributed to Trying on Apple TV and co-wrote the 2019 audio special The Goodies: The Big Ben Theory for Audible.

=== Presenting ===
In 2007, Gwynn hosted his own radio shows Gareth Gwynn's Big Night In for 106.3 Bridge FM and Gareth Gwynn's Alternative Anthems for Afan FM. From 2010 to 2017 he was a regular presenter on BBC Radio Wales, fronting weekly music shows and features, returning in 2018 to present two shows as part of the station's 40th birthday celebrations.

He has appeared as a guest on The Now Show several times and has also presented documentaries for BBC Radio 4 including Gareth Gwynn's Little Book Of Welsh Rock, The Greatest Ever Faker and two editions of Archive on 4, Gareth Gwynn's Alternative Archive and Gareth Gwynn Hasn't Fin- as well as producing Just A Minute: 50 Years In 28 Minutes and Rik Mayall, Panglobal Phenomenon.

Since 2021 he has co-presented The Xennial Dome podcast with Esyllt Sears. In September 2024 it was nominated for an Independent Podcast Award. In October the podcast was renamed I'm So Not Over It.
