= BBC Radio Comedy Writers Bursary =

BBC Radio Comedy Writers' Bursary
- Description: One‑year in‑house writing scheme for emerging comedy writers
- Country: United Kingdom
- Presented by: BBC Radio Comedy
- First award: 1978

The BBC Radio Comedy Writers' Bursary (or the BBC Radio Comedy Department Contract Writer) is a scheme through which emerging comedy writers work in-house at the BBC Radio Comedy department for a year.

== History ==
The scheme, which was originally known as the Peter Titheradge Award, began in 1978 and was devised by the then-head of Head of BBC Light Entertainment (Radio), David Hatch, and BBC Television's Head of Light Entertainment, James Gilbert. Each department put £5000 a year into a kitty to employ three young writers on a one-year contract. The only proviso was that there was to be no contract for a second year, and that the writers must then fend for themselves. The first beneficiaries were Rory McGrath, Jimmy Mulville and Guy Jenkin, who were followed by Rob Grant, Doug Naylor (Red Dwarf). Since then, the scheme has helped several aspiring or part-time writers to go full-time and has produced a great number of professional writers and comedians, including John O'Farrell, Peter Baynham, Stewart Lee and Simon Blackwell (The Thick Of It, Veep).

== Duties of recipients ==
Under the current regime, those selected for the bursary work on BBC Radio 4's three high-profile topical shows; The News Quiz, The Now Show and Dead Ringers, contribute writing across the range of the BBC Radio Comedy Department's output as well as script-editing sketch-shows and sitcoms. Bursary recipients are also encouraged to develop new formats and create their own shows.

== List of recipients ==
- 1978: Rory McGrath, Jimmy Mulville, Guy Jenkin
- 1979: Rob Grant, Doug Naylor, Martin Bergman
- 1980: Jon Canter, Angus Deayton, Tony Sarchet
- 1981: Scheme not run
- 1982: James Hendrie, Eddie Canfor-Dumas, David Jackson Young
- 1983: John Collee, Roger Planer
- 1984: Jack Docherty, Moray Hunter
- 1985: Malcolm Williamson, Stuart Silver, Alan Whiting
- 1986: Stephen Punt, David Bond, Paul Hawksbee
- 1987: Mike Coleman, Bill Matthews, Ged Parsons, Les Peters Rowley
- 1988: John O’Farrell, Mark Burton
- 1989: Peter Kerry, Simon Bullivant, Mark Brisenden
- 1990: Peter Baynham, Barry Atkins
- 1991: Robert Steele, Julian Dutton, Richard Herring, Stewart Lee
- 1992: Clive Coleman, Andy Riley, Kevin Cecil
- 1993: Rob Colley, Millie Murray, Paul Powell, Georgia Pritchett
- 1994: Dan Gaster, Andrew Clifford, Debbie Barham, Hugh Rycroft
- 1995: Will Ing, Kay Stonham
- 1996: Ben Ward, Dave Lamb, Tony Roche
- 1997: Felix Riley, Tom Jamieson
- 1998: Nev Fountain, Simon Blackwell
- 1999: Jon Holmes, Andy Hurst
- 2001-2003: Scheme not run
- 2004: Rhodri Crooks, Paul Kerensa
- 2005-2006: Scheme not run
- 2007: Danielle Ward, Kieron Quirke
- 2008: James Sherwood, Stephen Carlin
- 2009: Gareth Gwynn, John-Luke Roberts
- 2010: Jon Hunter, James Kettle
- 2011: Benjamin Partridge, Andy Wolton
- 2012: Jack Bernhardt, Tom Neenan
- 2013: James Bugg, Gráinne Maguire
- 2014: Gabby Hutchinson Crouch, Max Davis
- 2015: Sarah Campbell, Liam Beirne
- 2016: Robin Morgan, Jenny Laville
- 2017: Laura Major, Mike Shephard
- 2018: Kat Sadler, Catherine Brinkworth
- 2019: Simon Alcock, Charlie Dinkin
- 2020: Tasha Dhanraj, Rajiv Karia
- 2022: Cameron Loxdale, Jade Gebbie
- 2023: Cody Dahler, Kate Dehnert
- 2024: Peter Tellouche, Christina Riggs, Tim Davie (Undercover Boss)
- 2025: Eve Delaney, Ruth Huskisson
- 2026: Angela Channell, Adrian Gray
