= Zipline Creative =

Welsh film, TV, and radio production company

Zipline Creative Limited
- Industry: Media
- Founded: 2008; 17 years ago
- Headquarters: Risca, South Wales, United Kingdom
- Website: ziplinecreative.co.uk

Zipline Creative Limited was a South Wales based film, TV and radio production company, best known for its BBC Series Rhod Gilbert's Work Experience and contribution to the Cow – Don't Text And Drive campaign with Gwent Police. The company, founded in 2008 by two former BBC employees, is now based in Risca, in southeast Wales, and produces work for TV, radio and corporate clients.

== Viral Films ==
=== Cow – 2008 ===
"Cow" effective due to its highly graphic nature, affected the national debate in the United States about texting and driving. Following rapid viral success, major news outlets like The Today Show and all the national networks began to cover the film's impact. This was followed by worldwide coverage on news networks, online and in print. Furthermore, the film earned honours in the Advertising Age's weekly Creativity Top 5 video. It is now considered the most successful viral public safety announcement yet experienced on the web.

The film began humbly, originally commissioned by Gwent Police to be shown only in schools in the county. Having previously worked with local director Peter Watkins Hughes, they were approached by him to produce and shoot the new project on a modest budget. Zipline's core team, Nathan Mackintosh and Rhys Waters, were previously students on Peter's Documentary Film and Television Degree course, who were still working locally and in the process of setting up their own company.

Mackintosh and Waters based themselves in a small unit near Tredegar where they built a large green screen with enough space for a car to be wheeled in front. Alongside this, three identical Ford Kas, two identical Ford Mondeos and two Ford Fiestas were donated to the project by a local car dealer. An abandoned road was chosen to crash the cars in Tafarnaubach Industrial Estate, several miles from the unit. With help from young film makers, local fire fighters and engineers, the team successfully crashed the cars with a multiple camera setup, including a birds-eye view on the impact using a Sony PD170 attached to the bucket of a JCB.

The remains of the vehicle were then transported to the green screen unit, and the internal shots of the impact were filmed with the actresses. Nathan, who acted as director of photography, also was responsible for the special effects on this scene. Over several months he added the additional layers of blood, smoke and glass.

Following its release online and in current affairs outlets, "Cow" was broadcast on BBC Wales and was then picked up by BBC Three under the banner "Only Stwpid COWZ Txt N Drive".

== Television ==
=== Rhod Gilbert's Work Experience ===
- Series 1 (2010): Originally commissioned for BBC One Wales and following a successful broadcast, BBC Two decided to broadcast the show on its Wednesday 10 PM slot. The Zipline team worked freelance as producer/directors, editors and also on camera and sound on the series for Presentable RDF. Classed as factual entertainment, the series followed Rhod Gilbert as he tried out jobs he believed to be tougher than being a stand-up comedian.
- Series 2 (2011): Following the success of the first series on both BBC 2 and BBC One Wales, the original team was commissioned to produce another series of four episodes. The decision was made not to alter the format, aside from having mini sketches of Rhod doing his homework before each role. This choice was based on the thought that it was not the format that attracted people, but Rhods interaction with 'real' characters and allowing them their own space to shine on screen.
- Series 3 (2012): The third series was commissioned in late 2011, with Zipline Creative appointed as co-producers as well as producer/directors for the series for the first time. It was shown on BBC One Wales and BBC 2's 10PM comedy slot during winter of 2012. The team decided to try a mix of normal and more eccentric roles for Rhod to attempt, including 'School Teacher' which turned out to be one of the most popular episodes in the show's history.
- Series 4 (2013): A fourth series of Work Experience was commissioned in late 2012, again with Zipline Creative in their permanent role of co-producers of the show alongside Presentable. Most of the filming took place in spring 2013 and the series was broadcast on BBC One Wales in June. It was also broadcast on BBC 2's 10PM slot in August, and repeated on BBC Wales the following year in April 2014.
- Series 5 (2014): The fifth series was commissioned in early 2014, and was aired on BBC One in the autumn of 2014.

=== Gareth Thomas : Game Changer - 2014 ===
A 60-minute profile feature, documenting the life of the popular Welsh international rugby star. Broadcast on 26 October 2014.

== Radio ==
=== Social Club FM - 2012-13 ===
The first radio comedy series produced by Zipline Creative, Social Club FM, was a BBC Radio Wales sitcom based in a Valleys social club, starring Elis James, Chris Corcoran Vern Griffiths and Nadia Kamil. It ran for two series from 2012-2013 and was very well received critically. It subsequently gained a cult following with prominent comedy enthusiasts and a spin-off TV pilot was produced for BBC Three's Comedy Feeds. The show was written by Elis James (8 Out of Ten Cats, The Committee) and Gareth Gwynn (The News Quiz, The Armstrong And Miller Show) and produced by Sony Award Winning Producer Ben Walker.

=== Passing On - 2014 ===
Zipline's second radio comedy show, Passing On, was written by Gareth Gwynn and produced by Ben Partridge, and stars Felicity Montagu, Richard Elis, Keiron Self, Katy Wix, Simon Armstrong and Melangell Dolma. The six-part series was broadcast throughout July and August on BBC Radio Wales.

The plot follows the story of two very different brothers who are forced to reunite on a monthly basis thanks to an unusual clause in their mother's Will. Concerned that her two sons might drift apart after her death, she testates they meet up once a month to entrust the other with her ashes. They must do this every month without fail until the youngest brother's fortieth birthday.

=== The Unexplainers (2015) ===
Zipline Creative produced The Unexplainers, an audio programme on BBC Radio Wales following a video pilot episode, which summarised it as "Open-minded rap star John Rutledge and sceptic stand-up comedian Mike Bubbins travel the nation unexplaining the most unexplainable mysteries." Four series of The Unexplainers were produced during 2015–18, with three or four episodes each. It was followed up in 2019 with three episodes of a television programme of the same name that was broadcast on BBC Two Wales.

== Corporate Work ==
Through its corporate wing, Zipline Creative has produced work for Aston Martin Lagonda, The Institute Of Advanced Broadcast, The University of Wales College, Newport, and worked with actress Margaret John. They also work with local councils and not-for-profit organisations in Wales to produce campaign films and video content.

=== The Size Of Wales - 2011 ===
Rainforest charity the Size Of Wales, worked with Zipline to produce their second campaign. Shot and released in October 2011, it aimed to get the people of Wales to donate and help purchase large portions of rainforest for conservation. By mid 2012, donations have topped £1m with the video getting nearly 17,000 hits in 24 hours.

=== Discover Merthyr Tydfil - 2012 ===
Zipline produced an online promotional film for Merthyr Tydfil County Borough Council to feature on the Visit Merthyr website, with the aim of promoting activity tourism in the area. Helicopter footage of the Brecon Beacons area was used in the film to demonstrate the natural beauty of the area, and local people were recruited to take part in the range of outdoor activities featured.

=== Future Giants - 2013 ===
Zipline's first cinema advert was commissioned by Cardiff Sixth Form College to promote the higher education centre to prospective new students. The advert was produced in the style of a Hollywood film trailer, and featured current students at the college walking around the city of Cardiff in the form of giants. Zipline worked together with special effects company Burning Reel and used their onsite green screen studio to create the illusion of real giants in the city.

=== Time To Change Wales - 2012-14 ===
The Welsh mental health charity have produced a number of projects with Zipline Creative over the last two years. The first of which was 'In the Case of Dylan', a bilingual advert broadcast on ITV and S4C which highlighted the issues people often face when returning to work following leave due to mental illness, and encouraged people to talk about mental health. The advert was re-released in 2013 for cinema broadcast in South Wales. Zipline also produced event coverage films for TTCW in 2013, and a series of animated adverts in 2014 which were broadcast on S4C and nominated for an Inspire Wales Award.

=== Trades Union Congress animation – 2014 ===
The TUC commissioned Zipline to produce an animated advert to raise the issue of the cost of living crisis affecting young people in the UK. The advert was shared nationally on social media and appeared on an ITV current affairs programme about the campaign.

== Awards ==
The team won a Welsh BAFTA for their first series of Rhod Gilbert's Work Experience, two Celtic Media Festival Award's for their second and fifth series of the Rhod Gilbert programme, and the Chamber Of Commerce Award for Young Welsh Entrepreneurs of The Year 2009.
