= Ed Morrish =

British radio producer

Ed Morrish is a British radio comedy producer, joining the BBC as a trainee in 2002.

== Career ==
Morrish has numerous credits on BBC Radio which include Newsjack, The News Quiz, The Now Show, Mark Thomas: The Manifesto, Spats, John Finnemore's Souvenir Programme and Welcome to Our Village, Please Invade Carefully.

Morrish has also made shows with Kevin Eldon Andrew Maxwell, Tony Law, Paul Sinha, Milton Jones, Sue Perkins, Danielle Ward Sofie Hagen and Adam Buxton.

In November 2020 the Radio Times adjudicated the top twenty radio comedy shows ever, and Morrish had produced five of them.

Morrish has written for the New Statesman. Morrish has also appeared as a guest on the Cariad Lloyd podcast Griefcast.

He is the producer of the podcast Sound Heap, which he co-created with presenter John-Luke Roberts, it won the BBC Audio Drama Award for Best Sketch Comedy in 2022. The podcast is semi-improvised and a long list of guests include Tom Allen, Isy Suttie and Deborah Frances-White.

== Awards ==
Morrish won the Silver Award for Best Radio Comedy for the John Finnemore's Souvenir Programme at the 2014 Sony Awards. At the 2015 Audio production awards the Morrish produced show with John Finnemore won Best Scripted Comedy.

At the Audio Production Awards of 2017 Morrish was awarded Best Entertainment Producer. Morrish won Best Technical Production in 2018 for Welcome To Wherever You Are at the BBC Radio and Music Awards.
