= Luke Roberts =

Luke Roberts may refer to:

- Luke Roberts (cyclist)
- Luke Roberts (actor)
- John-Luke Roberts, comedian sometimes named Luke Roberts
