= James Sherwood (comedian) =

Comedian

- Born: 26 February 1975 (age 51); Rochford, Essex, England
- Education: Magdalen College School, Oxford
- Occupations: comedian, comedy writer

James Sherwood (born 26 February 1975) is a stand-up comedian, comedy writer, singer, pianist, and composer. He lives in Peckham, south London.

Born in Rochford, Essex, in 1975, Sherwood grew up in Oxford, Bristol, Essex, and London. He was a chorister in the choir of Magdalen College, Oxford, and attended Magdalen College School. As an undergraduate English student at Magdalen he became an academical clerk in the same choir.

He had a brief career in public relations and new media working on campaigns for brand including BlackBerry before starting his comedy and music career.

Sherwood was a semi-finalist in ITV's stand-up talent show Take the Mike in 2002. In 2004 he was runner-up in the BBC New Comedy Awards in 2004, and in the FHM Holsten Pils stand-up competition. In 2008 he was awarded the BBC Radio Comedy Writers Bursary.

Sherwood has performed several shows at the Edinburgh Festival Fringe, and in August 2010 he performed his latest show, One Man and his Piano. He also runs a popular residency, Piano Bar, in central London.

== Edinburgh Shows ==
Andrew O'Neill and James Sherwood, apparently (2004)

I Know What You Did Last Sunday (2006)

James Sherwood's Somewhat Premature Review of 2007 (2007)

Songs of Music (2008)

At the Piano (2009)

One Man and his Piano (2010)

== UK Tour ==
At the Piano – January–March 2010

== Awards and nominations ==
- Hollywood Fringe Festival 2010, won "Best Comedy Show" for At the Piano
- Buxton Festival Fringe 2010, nominated for "Best Individual Comedy Performance" for One Man and His Piano

== Radio and TV ==
Take the Mike (ITV).

40 Years of University Challenge (BBC2) – in a vocal group singing his own arrangement of the theme tune

Paper Review, Sky News – frequent appearances

Richard Bacon Show, BBC Radio 5 Live- frequent appearances

The Gethin Jones Show, BBC Radio 5 Live – regular guest

4 Stands Up (BBC Radio 4)

Loose Ends, BBC Radio 4

The Nemone Show, 6 Music

The Jon Richardson Show, 6 Music

== Comedy writing ==
Sherwood has written for many radio comedies, including:

- The News Quiz
- The Now Show (winner of a Sony award)
- I Guess That's Why They Call It The News
- Look Away Now
- Laura Solon Talking and Not Talking
- Recorded for Training Purposes
- Newsjack
- Guerilla Cricket
- Tilt
