= The Cricket Social =

Cricket television programme

The Cricket Social is a television program that provides live commentary on important cricket matches. The show is aired by BBC on the Sky TV Pictures

The show followed the format of Test Match Sofa.

The first episode featured Michael Vaughan and Phil Tufnell, as the hosts and was aired live on October 10, 2020, during the first One-day international between England and Sri Lanka.

== Style of Commentary ==
The style of commentary that was seen in The Cricket Social was totally different from that of live telecast shows. The show did not concentrate on the live events occurring in the match.

Instead the trending topics raised before and during the match were discussed among the experts. In addition to that, possible strategies and tactics that could be used by either team was also discussed and debated.

The audience's opinion was also welcomed and judged, and many notable TMS commentators have appeared in the show.

The show has featured commentators and former cricket players like Jonathan Agnew, Michael Vaughan, James Anderson, Alastair Cook, Kevin Pietersen, Ebony Rainford-Brent, Phil Tufnell and Andy Zaltzman.
