= Welcome to Our Village, Please Invade Carefully =

Welcome to our Village, Please Invade Carefully
- Genre: Sitcom
- Running time: 30 minutes
- Country of origin: United Kingdom
- Language: English
- Home station: BBC Radio 2 BBC Radio 4
- Starring: Hattie Morahan; Julian Rhind-Tutt; Charles Edwards
- Written by: Eddie Robson
- Produced by: Ed Morrish
- Original release: 5 July 2012 – 19 November 2014
- No. of series: 2
- No. of episodes: 11

Welcome To Our Village, Please Invade Carefully is a sitcom on BBC Radio 2 (pilot and series 1) and BBC Radio 4 (series 2), written by Eddie Robson and produced by Ed Morrish. It concerns the invasion of the small Buckinghamshire village of Cresdon Green by an alien race, the Geonin.

The programme stars Hattie Morahan as Katrina Lyons, a 30-something professional from London who was visiting her parents at the time of the invasion. Julian Rhind-Tutt (series 1) and Charles Edwards (series 2) star as Uljabaan, the leader of the aliens in smooth-talking human form. The pilot episode featured Katherine Parkinson as Katrina

The pilot aired on 5 July 2012. Series 1 was broadcast 7–28 March 2013, with the second series beginning on 15 October 2014. The Radio Times called it "the sitcom success story of 2012..."

== Cast ==
- Katrina Lyons - Hattie Morahan (Series 1 & 2) and Katherine Parkinson (Pilot)
- Field Commander Uljabaan - Julian Rhind-Tutt (Series 1), Charles Edwards (Series 2)
- Richard Lyons - Peter Davison
- Margaret Lyons - Jan Francis
- Lucy Alexander - Hannah Murray
- Computer - John-Luke Roberts
