= Daniel Norcross =

British cricket broadcaster (born 1969)

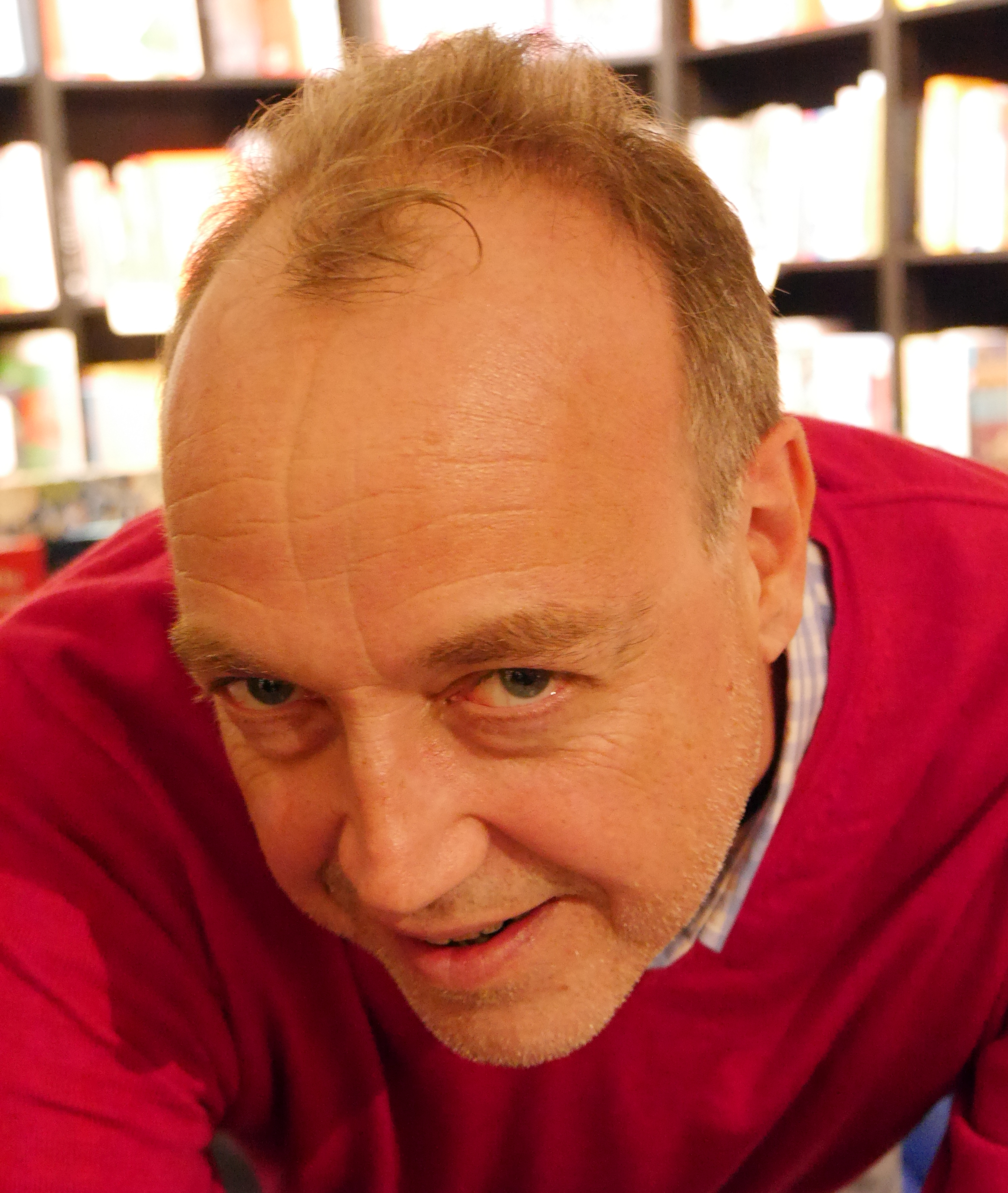
Norcross in 2019

Daniel Jonathan Edmund Norcross (born 14 April 1969) is a cricket broadcaster for Test Match Special. Norcross has been compared to the late TMS commentator John Arlott, in providing "an unusual perspective" to the commentary box.

== Early life ==
Norcross was educated at Dulwich College, and studied classics at St John's College, Oxford.

Before working for TMS, he had a series of different jobs, which included playing pub quiz machines, working in the City and for a number of dot-com start-ups, before setting up Test Match Sofa, an alternative amateur cricket commentary radio programme. Dan has, together with Philip Paine, recently edited a book about the forty-eight casualties listed on the war memorial at Surrey County Cricket Club, The Oval, London. It is called "The 48". He also wrote the Foreword to "The Faintest of Tickles", an anthology of cricket writing by authors and journalists, including, among others, Ben Macintyre and Judith Cutler.
