= Garry Richardson =

British sports reporter (born c. 1956)

Garry Richardson MBE
- Born: 1956 or 1957 (age 69–70)
- Spouse: 1
- Children: 3
- Presenting career
- Show: Sportsweek
- Station: BBC Radio 5 Live
- Time slot: 9.00–10.00 GMT/BST Sundays
- Show: Today
- Station: BBC Radio 4
- Country: United Kingdom
- Website: www.bbc.co.uk/programmes/b00p2dfq

Garry John Richardson MBE (born 1956/1957) is a British radio presenter. He presented the Sunday morning sports programme Sportsweek on BBC Radio 5 Live until 15 September 2019. He remained a sports presenter on the weekday morning Today show on BBC Radio 4 until 9 September 2024, after 43 years in the role. This coincided with his 50th anniversary at the BBC.

== Career ==
Garry Richardson began his broadcasting career with BBC Radio Oxford. He had previously been a youth player at Reading and Southampton football clubs but quickly realised that he was unlikely to become a professional footballer.

Richardson gave his first sports report on national radio in 1981 as a 'cub' reporter, introduced by Today's co-presenter Brian Redhead for the match between Nottingham Forest and Manchester United. Under the tutorship of Tony Adamson, Bryon Butler and the commentator Peter Jones, Richardson rose to become the regular sports reporter on the show, celebrating his 40th anniversary on the show on 18 March 2021, making him the Today programme's longest-running contributor.

For 20 years Richardson presented the highly successful Sunday morning sports programme Sportsweek on BBC Radio 5 Live BBC podcasts. He was known for presenting the show with a direct and persistent interview style. He has stated that he believes in asking the same question three times if he has not received a response, a style also favoured by fellow journalists Jeremy Paxman and John Humphrys. He gained interviews from a wide range of sources (football) and regularly had guests from the national press as co-host.

The show won a Sony Gold Award in 2007 for Best Sports Programme. The show was nominated in the same category in the 2009 awards but lost out to 5 Live's coverage of the 2008 Summer Olympics (Olympic Breakfast (gold) and Olympic Sportsworld (bronze)) and also The Football Forum (silver).

He began presenting a sports sketch and interview show, Look Away Now, for BBC Radio 4 in 2007 spoofing his own style.

In March 2017, Richardson, ended a Today interview with cricketer James Anderson by saying that "[Anderson] was speaking to us in conjunction with Brut aftershave, who he is an ambassador for", which prompted the BBC to apologise for its promotion of the product against editorial guidelines.

== Famous interviews ==
Richardson has interviewed a variety of personalities from the world of sport and politics. He has conducted interviews with former South African president Nelson Mandela and Hansie Cronje, the South African cricket captain.

During a rain delay at Wimbledon, Richardson got a note through to former President of the United States Bill Clinton and persuaded him to give an impromptu interview in the Royal Box, with a crowd of 18,000 watching. In 2002, he irritated tennis player Anna Kournikova, who requested the interview be restarted when he cast aspersions on her confidence level after losing at Wimbledon.

== Public speaking ==
Richardson is also a public or after-dinner speaker, an activity he has performed for 23 years. He regularly introduces anecdotes into his speech from interviews that he has conducted.

== Personal life ==
Richardson is a supporter of Oxford United FC from his previous reporting days on BBC Radio Oxford.

Richardson can regularly be seen in the stands of local side Woking FC.

== Programmes ==
- Today
- Sportsweek
- Look Away Now
