= Henry Paker =

British comedian and illustrator

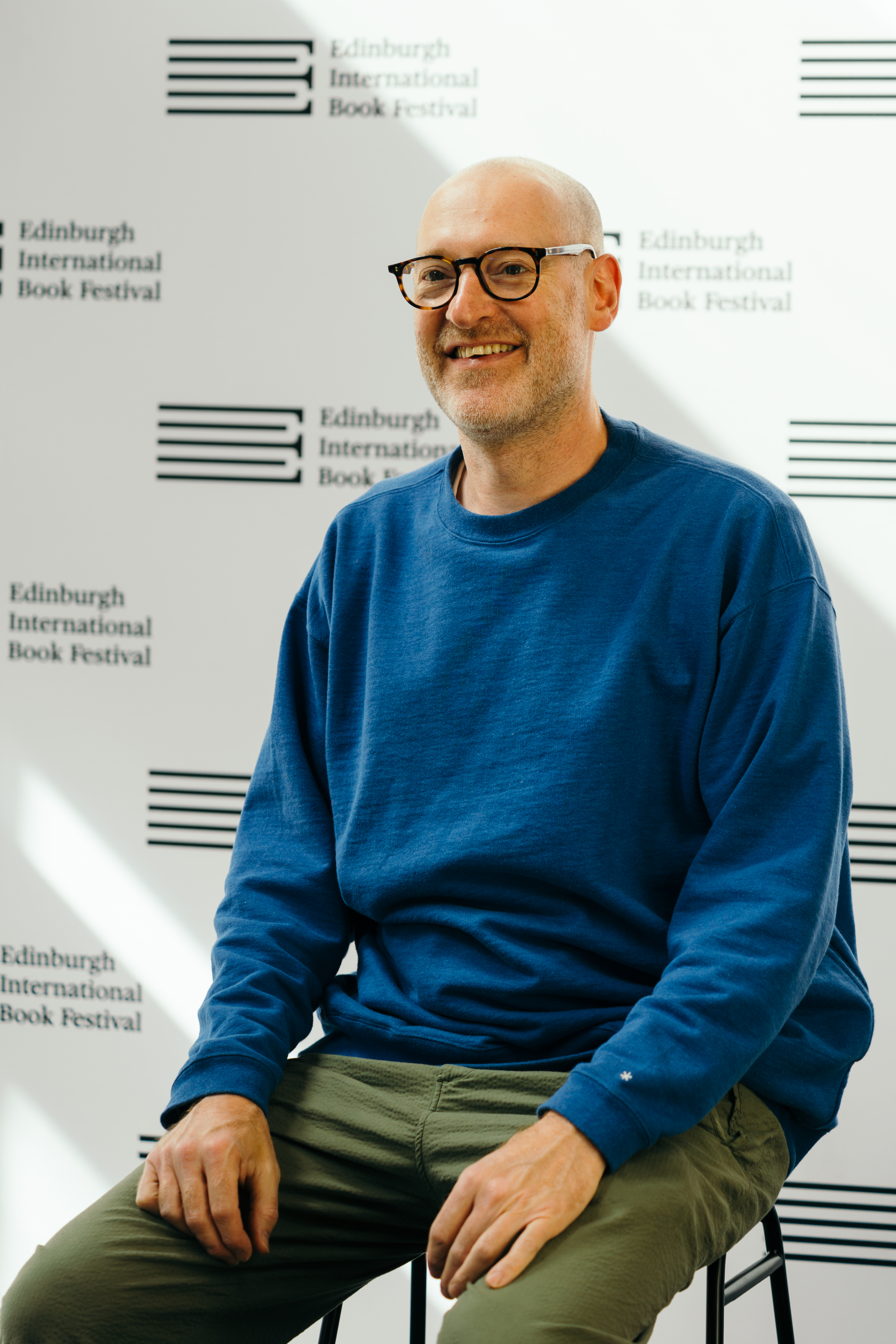
- Paker at the 2025 Edinburgh International Book Festival
- Occupations: Comedian, writer, actor, artist, illustrator
- Years active: 1990s–present
- Notable work: Three Bean Salad

Henry Paker is a British comedian, writer and illustrator. His radio work includes the BBC Radio 4 sitcom ReincarNathan, he is a host of the Three Bean Salad podcast, and he has appeared on the Beef and Dairy Network Podcast.

Paker has written for television series 8 Out of 10 Cats, Mock the Week, Comic Relief, Top Gear, Russell Howard’s Good News, Seann Walsh World, Michael McIntyre's Big Show, Never Mind the Buzzcocks, Stand Up for the Week, Big Fat Quiz of the Year, Hypothetical and Would I Lie To You. He has acted in an episode of the sitcom Josh.

== Stand-up comedy ==
Paker began performing stand-up comedy in 2006. In 2008 he won the Leicester Mercury Comedian of the Year and came second place in the Laughing Horse new act competition.

Paker has performed at the Edinburgh Festival Fringe regularly, first performing in 2008.

The comedian Ivo Graham declared Paker’s 2010 Edinburgh Festival Fringe show, which he described as a “surrealist maverick unreading the Bible”, as the funniest stand up he had ever seen. The Independent in 2010 saw “flashes of bonkers brilliance.. the real joy lies in the duo’s surreal flights of fancy” before it “descends into irredeemable silliness by the end” when reviewing The Golden Lizard which Paker wrote and performed with Mike Wozniak. The Golden Lizard won Paker and Wozniak the Best New Show at the Leicester Comedy Festival in 2011.

Paker’s one liner “Are headphones getting bigger or are idiots getting smaller?” made The Guardian best 10 joke list from the 2016 Edinburgh Festival, as well as a selection in The Daily Telegraph. Paker had also previously made The Guardian’s list in 2014. In 2014 fellow comedian Romesh Ranganathan described Paker as “a genius.. funny falls out of him.”

Paker’s 2018 Edinburgh show Man Alive was described as an “introverts manifesto” that “exceeds expectations in a wonderfully imaginative way” in The Times with Paker proving to be “a grandmaster at the pull-back-and-reveal”. The show was directed by Amy Beth Hayes.

== Comedy podcasts ==
Paker is a member of the Three Bean Salad podcast with fellow comics Benjamin Partridge and Mike Wozniak. The podcast was described as having an “RP-accented vibe” by The Times, with the comics “meandering off the point of a different topic each week”. The podcast has had occasional live shows such as at the London Podcast Festival in 2021. In March 2024, it won in the Best Podcast category at the Chortle Awards.

Paker is a regular contributor on the Beef and Dairy Network Podcast, a comedy podcast presented and written by comedian Benjamin Partridge.

== Illustrations ==
As an illustrator, Paker was said by The Guardian to have “charmingly” provided the illustrations for Adam Kay’s book Anatomy as well as Kay’s follow up Kay's Marvellous Medicine: A Gross and Gruesome History of the Human Body, which was nominated for the Children's Non-fiction Book of the Year Award at the British Book Awards. Paker illustrated the 2023 autobiography of comedian Joe Wilkinson.

Paker co-wrote and illustrated the book Why Steve Was Late: 101 Exceptional Excuses for Terrible Timekeeping with Dave Skinner with whom he also wrote Don't Arm Wrestle a Pirate, which was made into animations voiced by Steve Coogan.

Paker’s illustrations have appeared in The Spectator, The Observer and Prospect (magazine).

== Personal life ==
Paker attended the Anna Scher Theatre School in Islington.
