= Doodle Do =

British television series

- Genre: Children's television, arts and crafts, educational
- Written by: Dean Wilkinson; Trevor Neal; Simon Hickson
- Presented by: Chris Corcoran
- Voices of: Yvonne Stone; Adam Carter; Mark Mander
- Music by: Richie Webb
- Country of origin: United Kingdom
- Original language: English

Original release
- Network: CBeebies
- Release: January 30, 2006 – 2010

Doodle Do is a British arts and crafts television programme, specially designed for pre-school children (2 to 5 years). It aired on the CBeebies channel between 2006 and 2010. The programme features three "Doodle Doers" — puppets called "Dib-Dab", "Scribble" and "Stick" — who interact with a human presenter, Chris Corcoran, a Welsh stand-up comedian.

== Format ==
Dib-Dab, Scribble and Stick are three literal glove hand creatures, as they consist of colourful knitted gloves decorated with eyes, noses, and hair. They are each operated by three puppeteers who remain concealed behind features of the studio set, such as curtains or boxes, or beneath the raised studio floor. One episode was filmed in the French Ski Resort of 'Les Deux Alpes'.

The programme is a loose "how to" arts feature similar to SMarteenies, but aimed at an even younger audience. Chris and the puppets explore making models from boxes, simple collages and so on. A story or game is featured, during which the puppets play characters using the items they have created.

The programme always ends with some "Doodle do" and "Doodle don't" advice, such as "Doodle do: have fun with your model car, and doodle don't: forget to tidy up afterwards".

There are also small 5-minute portions of the show called "Doodle Do Making Moments" which are broadcast. These feature one "make" and do not have much of a storyline.

The three puppets all still have distinctive personalities. Dib-Dab (voiced by Yvonne Stone) is giddily enthusiastic, concerned for others and loves the colour pink so much, that whenever it seems someone else is going to get the pink paper, she will whimper with misery and longing; Scribble (voiced by Adam Carter) is a bit of a comedian with a fondness for puns; and Stick (voiced by Mark Mander) is rather anxious (similar to George from Rainbow, whom Mark Mander has also "played", and Bob the Anteater from It's a Big Big World), and often needs to be reassured by Chris. Stick enjoys chanting the word "Blob" whilst painting or glueing, and seems to get into a trance-like state doing so.

The music includes a gamelan-style tune that accompanies the doodling of animated sandworms in each episode.

== Cast and crew ==
- Presenter: Chris Corcoran
- Dib-Dab: Yvonne Stone
- Scribble: Adam Carter
- Stick: Mark Mander
- Writers: Dean Wilkinson, Trevor Neal, Simon Hickson
- Music: Richie Webb

== Episodes ==
1. Box Snake
2. Handprint Fish
3. Envelope Puppets
4. Blowing Pictures
5. Paper Plate Kite
6. Gravity Dribble Picture
7. Headband Decoration
8. Wool Collage
9. Colour Snap Cards
10. Box Building Blocks
11. Bottle Faces
12. Treasure Box
13. Rainstick
14. Foil Sculptures
15. Finger Painting Prints
16. Bird Feeder
17. Dipping Pictures
18. Parrots On A Perch
19. Funny Wig
20. Beach Picture
21. Paint 'n' Peel Pictures
22. Jelly Fish
23. Salt Water Dough
24. Animals Out Of Pebbles
25. Streamer Flag
26. Winter Special
27. Circle Printing
28. Ball Biscuit Tin
29. Cup and Ball Game
30. Spray and Splatter
31. Tissue Paper Stained Glass
32. Nature Collage
33. Spiders Web
34. Chalk Smudge
35. Ice Cube Drawing
36. Tissue Box Clown Shoes

== Award nominations ==
- BAFTA Children's Awards 2006
  - Nominated for Best Pre-school Live Action Series
