= Eleri Morgan =

Welsh actress and comedian

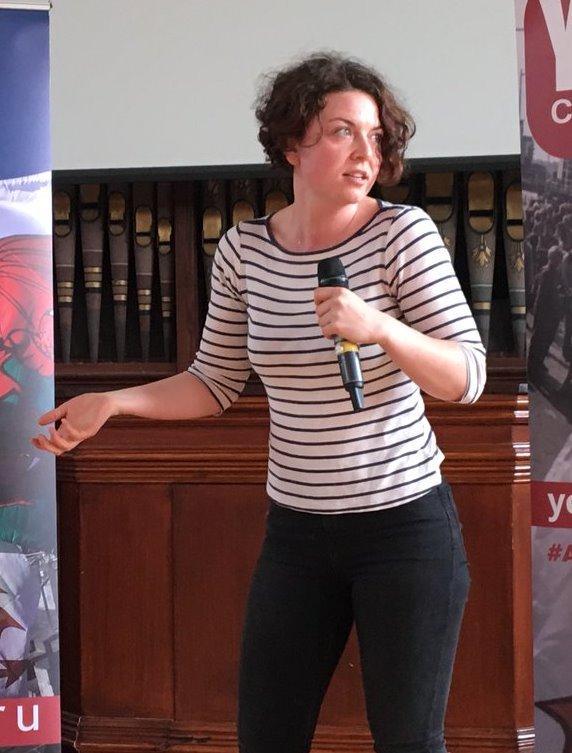
- Eleri Morgan in November 2018
- Born: Aberystwyth, Wales

Eleri Morgan is a Welsh actress and comedian. She was brought up in the Aberystwyth area and now lives in Cardiff, having previously lived in London.

== Biography ==
Morgan was born and raised in the Aberystwyth area and attended the Welsh language school Ysgol Gyfun Gymunedol Penweddig and she then studied at the Arts Education Schools in London. In addition to acting and comedy, she is also a yoga teacher.

== Career ==
=== Acting ===
Morgan has acted in various stage plays. She has acted in Henry V as Alice at Shakespeare's Globe in London, Masie is Honest at Alma Tavern & Theatre, Bristol and dubbed to BBC Wales among other parts. She has also appeared on television drama series, including Hinterland and Decline and Fall.

=== Comedy ===
Morgan performed at the Swansea Fringe Festival 2017 as part of a comedy session. and the Leicester Comedy Festival with Esyllt Sears. She performed a Welsh set at the Aberystwyth Comedy Festival in 2018. She has also performed in Stand Up For Wales comedy sessions. She is one of the presenters of BBC Wales's online saga and playwright series Sesh. In 2019 she joined the cast of the BBC One Wales mockumentary Tourist Trap.
