= Fred MacAulay =

Scottish comedian (born 1956)

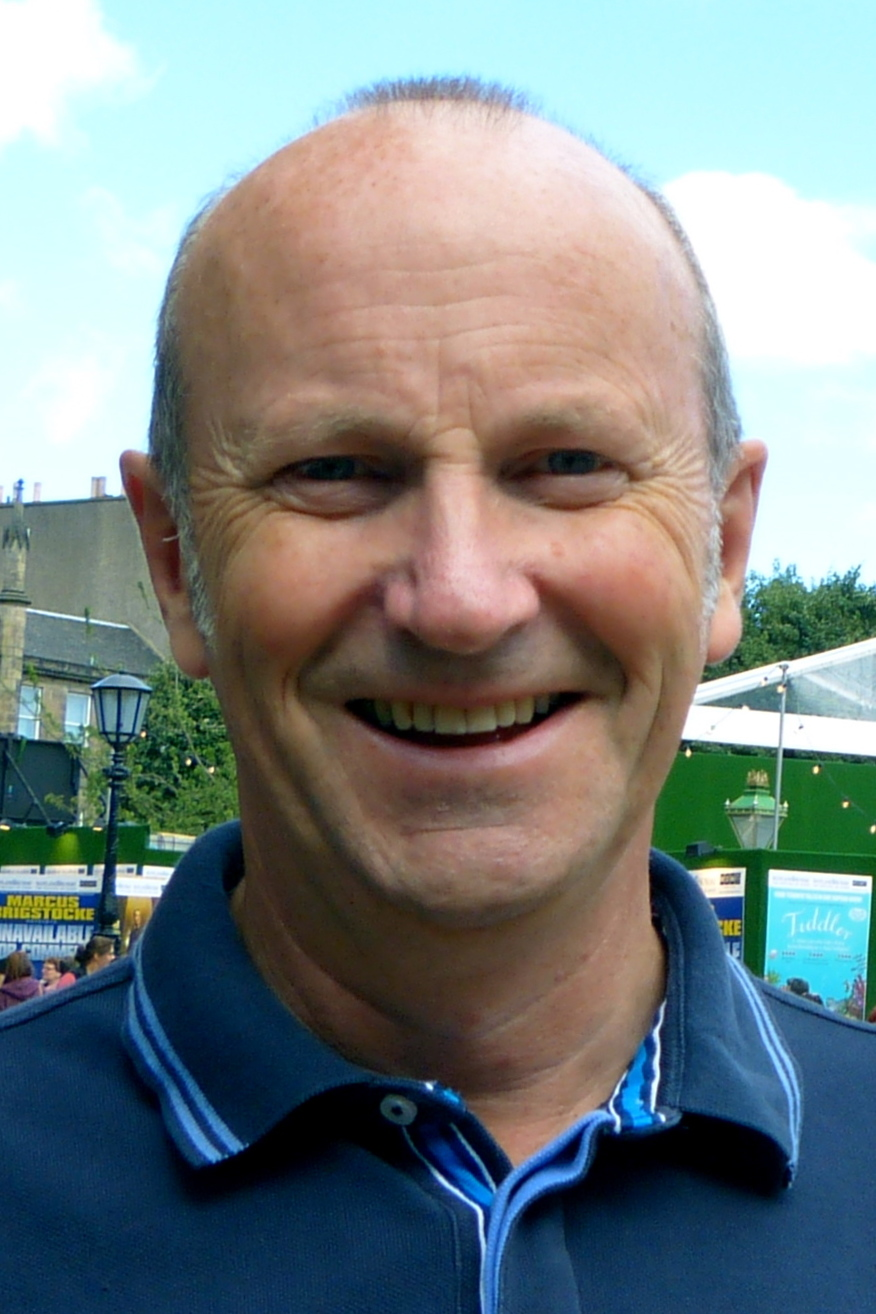
- MacAulay in 2013
- Born: 29 December 1956 (age 68); Perth, Scotland
- Education: University of Dundee
- Occupation: Comedian
- Spouse: Aileen MacAulay (m. 1984)
- Children: 3

Frederick MacAulay (born 29 December 1956) is a Scottish comedian. For 18 years, until March 2015, he presented a daily BBC Scotland radio programme MacAulay and Co. He has appeared on numerous TV shows.

== Background ==
Born in Perth, MacAulay was educated at Killin Primary School, at Rattray Primary School and Blairgowrie High School, both in Blairgowrie, and at Perth Academy. In 1978, he graduated from the University of Dundee with an MA in accountancy and jurisprudence. He went on to work as an accountant in a number of companies, including the Cairngorm Chairlift Company in Aviemore. In 1984, he married Aileen; the couple have three children. In July 2025, MacAulay disclosed that he had been diagnosed with prostate cancer, at a "very early" stage.

== Work ==
MacAulay's first experience of stand-up comedy came at Bar Point in the "West End" of Paisley. He enjoyed vocal support from some close friends as he appeared alongside the established Glasgow comedian Bruce Morton. From there, in 1988 he performed at Mayfest festival in Glasgow, which burgeoned into a semi-professional career, including jobs as a warm-up act for TV programmes including Have I Got News for You and for comedians Paul Merton and Rory Bremner. His first on-screen appearance came on STV's stand-up programme The Funny Farm. MacAulay became a full-time professional comedian in 1993. He also presented two series of the children's version of Now You See It in 1994 and 1995 on Scottish Television.

MacAulay has gone on to be a regular performer at the Edinburgh Fringe and at comedy festivals worldwide. He had presented BBC Radio Scotland's morning show from 1997 to 2015, and for BBC TV he hosted one series of the talk show McCoist and MacAulay (with retired footballer Ally McCoist), two seasons of Life According to Fred and BBC Scotland's coverage of Children in Need with Hazel Irvine in 1998 and 1999 and Jackie Bird from 2000 to 2002. He has appeared as a guest on comedy quiz programmes They Think It's All Over, I'm Sorry I Haven't a Clue, The Unbelievable Truth, Just a Minute, QI, The News Quiz and Mock the Week, and made a return to Have I Got News For You as an on-screen guest.

In 2009 he hosted a panel game on BBC Radio 4, I Guess That's Why They Call It The News. In October 2018 MacAulay appeared in the Scottish episode of HISTORY's TV series Al Murray: Why Does Everyone Hate The English alongside host Al Murray. In 2020, MacAulay was chosen to host Zoom interviews with Fringe celebrities for the Gilded Balloon's '35th' year.

In 2001 he was elected Rector of the University of Dundee and was formally installed in office on 3 May 2001. In 2007, he competed in Comic Relief Does Fame Academy and was the seventh to be eliminated.

Fred currently hosts a Sunday-morning show on Clyde 2 from 10 am to 1 pm. The show is produced and broadcast from the station's Clydebank studios in Glasgow and carried on Greatest Hits Radio's network of locally-branded Scottish stations. The show includes a "top 10 @ 10" feature and music from the 1970s, 1980s and 1990s along with special guests.

Academic offices
| Preceded by Tony Slattery | Rector of the University of Dundee; 2001–2004 | Succeeded by Lorraine Kelly |
