= Test Match Sofa =

- Genre: Sport (cricket) commentary
- Running time: During England Test Matches
- Country of origin: United Kingdom
- Language: English
- Created by: Daniel Norcross and Tom Clark
- Produced by: Luke Beckett, Bill Leuty and James Crawford
- Original release: 2009 – 2014
- Audio format: Internet radio
- Website: Official Website

Test Match Sofa was a radio programme providing cricket commentary for all England test matches and selected One Day Internationals. The programme was available worldwide, and broadcast on the Sports Tonight Live channel serving as alternative commentary to the BBC's Test Match Special which is only available in the United Kingdom. In 2012 Test Match Sofa was taken over by The Cricketer magazine.

The station began broadcasting from the Tooting Bec home of one of the station's creators, Daniel Norcross, but moved to a rented house in Nunhead, also in South London, in August 2010. In January 2011, Test Match Sofa moved to an undisclosed location, believed to be somewhere in North London.

The commentary was uncensored and partial, usually in favour of England, or anyone playing against Australia. Listeners interacted with the show's commentators through Twitter, with this interaction often influencing the agenda, and being asked to do the statistical leg-work that Norcross could not be bothered to do.

The station was taken off air in 2014 following behind the scenes pressure on The Cricketer Magazine (owners) from the England and Wales Cricket Board (ECB). Although Test Match Sofa is not illegal the ECB has argued that its operation is in principle in contravention of the Board's authority to control UK broadcasting rights – especially radio rights which have been sold to the BBC. Despite this, an almost identical operation, Guerilla Cricket, began broadcasting commentary of England v India Test matches in July 2014 and has continued, with a line-up very similar to that of Test Match Sofa, into the winter with coverage of the Pakistan v Australia series from the UAE and the 2015 Ashes series.

Furthermore, ahead of the 2017–18 Ashes, Norcross joined Test Match Special's commentary team. In addition, when they lost out to TalkSPORT for the broadcast rights to England’s 2018 tour of Sri Lanka, the BBC produced The Cricket Social for the tour, starring Norcross and the rest of the Test Match Special team in a format similar to Test Match Sofa’s.

Guests on the show have included cricketers John Barclay, Martin Bicknell, Iain O'Brien, Rikki Clarke, John Emburey, Laurie Evans, Graeme Fowler, Angus Fraser, Ed Giddins, Greg Matthews, Tim Murtagh, Ollie Rayner, Shaun Tait and Claire Taylor. Other guests have included Jarrod Kimber, Miles Jupp, Andy Zaltzman, Alex Massie, Bill Cash, Matthew Hancock, Mark Steel, Tom Holland, Chris Medland, Patrick Kidd, Francis Leach, Mark Webster, Rory Bremner, Peter Wilson, Jonathan Wilson and Gordon Kennedy.
