= Sportsweek =

- Genre: Sports interview show
- Running time: 60 minutes (approx)
- Country of origin: UK
- Language(s): English
- Home station: BBC Radio 5 Live
- Hosted by: Garry Richardson
- Recording studio: BBC Television Centre (5 Live Compound), London
- Original release: Present
- Website: The official BBC website
- Podcast: Sportsweek Podcast

Sportsweek was a topical sports show broadcast on BBC Radio 5 Live. The show aired on Sunday mornings and was presented by Garry Richardson, who is also a presenter on the Today show on BBC Radio 4. The show was produced by Richardson's own production company, Frontpage Media.

== Format ==
Richardson interviews a host of well-known names from the world of sport throughout the 60-minute show, often pressing his guest for information. On the show he is famous for asking questions to interviewees three times in order to elicit the response he is looking for.

== Awards ==
The show won an award for Best Sports Programme at the Sony Awards in 2007. It was the second 5 Live radio show to win a Sony Award that year, with 5 Live Breakfast picking up the award for News and Current Affairs Programme.

== Famous presenters ==
- Garry Richardson
- John Watson
- Hugh Woozencroft (broadcast assistant)
