= Bull (2015 TV series) =

- Promotional image released in anticipation of the series' broadcast, from left to right: Naz Osmanoglu (Toby), Maureen Lipman (Beverley Bull), Claudia Jessie (Faye), and Robert Lindsay (Rupert Bull)
- Genre: Situation comedy
- Created by: Gareth Gwynn; John-Luke Roberts
- Based on: Antiquity by Gareth Gwynn and John-Luke Roberts
- Written by: Gareth Gwynn; John-Luke Roberts
- Directed by: Simon Gibney
- Starring: Robert Lindsay; Maureen Lipman; Claudia Jessie; Naz Osmanoglu
- Composer: Stephen Coates
- Country of origin: United Kingdom
- Original language: English
- No. of series: 1
- No. of episodes: 3

Production
- Executive producers: Layla Smith; Paul Jackson; Simon Lupton; Matt Lucas
- Producer: Jack Cheshire
- Production locations: Pinewood Studios, Buckinghamshire, England
- Editor: James Cooper
- Running time: 30 minutes
- Production company: John Stanley Productions

Original release
- Network: Gold
- Release: 21 October – 4 November 2015

Bull is a British television sitcom created and written by Gareth Gwynn and John-Luke Roberts, who adapted it for television from their radio pilot, Antiquity.

The show stars well-known comic actors Robert Lindsay and Maureen Lipman as the eponymous siblings and antiques shop owners Rupert and Beverley Bull, around whom the programme centres, alongside Claudia Jessie and Naz Osmanoglu as their hapless staff-members Faye and Toby respectively.

== Cast ==
- Robert Lindsay as Rupert Bull
- Maureen Lipman as Beverley
- Claudia Jessie as Faye
- Naz Osmanoglu as Toby
- Matt Lucas as Mr Richards
- Toby Williams as Desmond

== Production ==
Bull was one of three sitcoms, alongside Marley's Ghosts and Henry IX, announced by UKTV on 28 May 2015, and was initially slated for broadcast in late 2015 or early 2016.

The show was created by writers Gareth Gwynn and John-Luke Roberts, who adapted it from their 2010 Radio 4 pilot, Antiquity, which had starred Tim McInnerny as Rupert Bull.

Screenings at which a laughter track was recorded for the programme took place before a studio audience between 4 September, and 10 September 2015.

== Broadcast and reception ==
=== Critical reception ===
Bull received highly positive reviews from critics, with particular praise reserved for Robert Lindsay's performance.

Reviewing for The Independent, Sally Newall wrote the series "left [her] wanting more", singling out for particular praise Matt Lucas' "scene-stealing" guest turn, and the performances of leads Lindsay and Lipman, who were a "treat to watch". She also praised the plotting as "unpredictable and illogical", to her a sign of "good surreal comedy". Writing for Beyond the Joke, Bruce Dessau acclaimed the series as "endearingly, instantly classic", again singling out Lindsay for particular praise as "his pedigree is second to none". He also praised an "elaborate knockabout visual gag", which opened the first episode, as "So brilliant, in fact that they shamelessly do it twice".
