= Tourist Trap (TV series) =

UK comedy TV series

- Genre: Comedy
- Written by: Sian Harries, Tudur Owen, Gareth Gwynn
- Directed by: Keri Collins
- Country of origin: United Kingdom
- Original language: English
- No. of series: 2 + 1 Rugby Special + 1 Stay At Home Radio Special

Production
- Executive producer: Rab Christie
- Production company: The Comedy Unit

Original release
- Network: BBC One Wales

Tourist Trap is a Welsh TV mockumentary-style comedy series following the fictional tourist board WOW Wales. Sally Phillips heads the cast as the director of the organization. The show was first broadcast on BBC One Wales in 2018 as part of the channel's Festival Of Funny. As of 2024, the series is available to stream for free in the UK on BBC iPlayer.

== Production ==
Tourist Trap shares a production company (The Comedy Unit), executive producer (Rab Christie) and some members of its production team with the stylistically similar shows Scot Squad and Soft Border Patrol, which are broadcast on BBC Scotland and BBC Northern Ireland respectively. All three are semi-improvised sketch-shows, filmed in a mockumentary style and initially comprised stand-alone scenes set within the individual departments of the fictional organizations they follow. However in the Six Nations special and series 2 of Tourist Trap, the show began to deviate from this template as episodes would sometimes incorporate a narrative and the show also saw members of individual departments appear in other team's scenes.

The show reflects contemporary Welsh events including the rugby team's performance, the appearance of a new Banksy artwork in Port Talbot and the increased popularity in DNA tourism.

In June 2020, during the COVID-19 pandemic, a single radio edition of the show was broadcast on BBC Radio Wales. Using the same format as the television show, The Stay At Home Radio Special dealt with the characters having to work from home and interact via telephone and Zoom as the organization changed its message and asked tourists to not visit Wales during lockdown.

== Cast ==
- Sally Phillips - Elaine Gibbons
- Elis James - Nez
- Mike Bubbins - Wyn
- Mali Ann Rees - Kara
- Mari Beard - Charlotte
- Leroy Brito - Rob
- Tom Price - Jon
- Remy Beasley - Hari (Series 1)
- Eleri Morgan - Gwen (Series 2)
- Lloyd Everitt - Iestyn (Series 2)
- Sara Gregory - Amy
- Tudur Owen - Gwilym
- Sion Pritchard - Mark
- Sarah Breese - Kath
- Richard Elis - Marshall
- Gareth Gwynn - Radio DJ (Voice)
- Jenna Preece - Rachel
- Sian Harries - Meinir

== Guest appearances as themselves ==
- Derek Brockway
- Eggsy
- Gareth Edwards
- Neville Wilshire
- Tom Shanklin
- Scott Quinnell
- Jason Mohammad
