= Cow (public service announcement) =

2009 public information film

Cow, also titled Only Stwpd Cowz Txt N Drive, is a 30-minute public information film directed by Peter Watkins-Hughes with assistance from Gwent Police and Tredegar Comprehensive School in Wales. The August 2009 film was a co-production by Gwent Police and Tred Films, with special effects by Zipline Creative Limited. The film features original music by Stuart Fox, a composer and sound designer from Gloucester, England. A previous film, Lucky Luke, was intended to warn about the dangers of joyriding; Cow was intended to be a sequel of sorts. The film was shown to students in the UK and was released on YouTube.

The film, using local drama students as actors, tells the story of 17-year-old Cassie "Cow" Cowan (Jenny Davies), who texts and drives and gets into a car accident; her friends Emm and Jules (Amy Ingram and Laura Quantick) are in the vehicle with her. Four people, including Emm and Jules, die as a result of Cow's actions. The police intended for the film to be aired in British schools.

The film cost "a few thousand pounds" to make. Three hundred drama students auditioned for the film.

The full film is shown to students in the United Kingdom. As of 2009 the film had not been aired on television stations in the United States. In 2010, a modified 30-second version of the public service announcement was to begin airing during certain hours on 13 television stations in central and upstate South Carolina.

== Story ==
Cassie "Cow" Cowan, Emma "Emm" Williams, and Jules O'Shea, three teenage friends who work at the same hardware shop in Tredegar, Gwent, agree to leave work early in order to cheer up Jules, who threw up on duty after discovering that she was pregnant. On the way home, Cow texts while driving and her car drifts across the road and collides head-on with another car. Subsequently, a third driver accidentally crashes into them. Emm and Jules are killed in the accident, along with a couple in the second vehicle involved in the crash, while the couple's young son survives. It is not clear what the outcome is for the third driver or a young baby of the second driver. After sometime, a driver spots the crash site, steps out of his car, orders drivers behind him to call an ambulance and attempts to open Cassie's door, but is unsuccessful in doing so.

The rest of the film depicts the accident's aftermath and consequences. The police break the news to bereaved relatives, and Cow herself almost dies in hospital, but is revived. At the hospital, Cow's father meets the grandmother of the couple's son. In the aftermath of the accident, Cow and her parents are ostracised by the local community, starting with when Cow's parents attend Emm's funeral but are demanded to leave the wake on account of Cow being the cause of Emm's death. Cow gets berated by another patient over her actions, while Jules' boyfriend Morgan appears on television to express his grief about the death of their unborn baby (although he had previously dumped her because of the pregnancy). Cow's mother visits the supermarket, but because one of the assistants there was the sister of one of the victims in the second car, the manager orders the cashier not to serve her. When a local paper reports that Cow was breathalyzed shortly before the accident, her father gets shunned by his colleagues at work (she was stopped by the police for speeding, but passed the test). The last straw is when an unknown assailant spray paints "Murdering Cow" on Cow's parents' garage door. Eventually, despite her mother's reassurances that she did nothing wrong, Cow is sentenced to seven years imprisonment for causing death by dangerous driving. A postscript notes that the victims' families tried to sue Cow and her family, but were unsuccessful.

== Reception ==
The clip of the public service announcement received worldwide attention, and the clip received over one million views on YouTube by 25 August 2009 and reuploaded on 28 May 2016. The video received attention due to the graphic content. The film earned honours in the Advertising Age's weekly Creativity Top 5 video. and became an overnight worldwide internet hit after being shown on the US The Today Show television show.

Donny Deutsch, advertising executive and American TV host, said "I will show this to every kid I know, and I salute the police department" and "I would really implore various local stations: Run this stuff, put this on the air. It will help." Mick Giannasi, the then chief constable of Gwent Police, said "The messages contained in the film are as relevant to the people of Tennessee as they are to the residents of Tredegar." He also said "Texting and driving can have tragic consequences, and the more this film is viewed, the better."

== Cast ==
- Jenny Davies – Cassie "Cow" Cowan
- Amy Ingram – Emma "Emm" Williams
- Laura Quantick – Jules O'Shea
- Roger Evans – Michael Cowan
- Adrienne O'Sullivan – Laura Cowan
- Phylip Harries – Mr. Williams
- Jason May – Mr. O'Shea
- Gareth Price-Stephens – Morgan Davis
- Margaret John – Joyce Richards
