= Three Bean Salad =

Comedy podcast

- Genre: Comedy

Cast and voices
- Hosted by: Benjamin Partridge; Mike Wozniak; Henry Paker

Publication
- No. of episodes: 174
- Original release: 27 April 2021

Reception
- Ratings: 4.89/5, 5.0/5, 5/5
- Cited as: Best Comedy Podcast (Chortle, 2024)

Three Bean Salad is a British comedy podcast launched in April 2021 by Benjamin Partridge, Mike Wozniak and Henry Paker. It was voted Best Comedy Podcast at the Chortle Awards in March 2024.

== Format ==
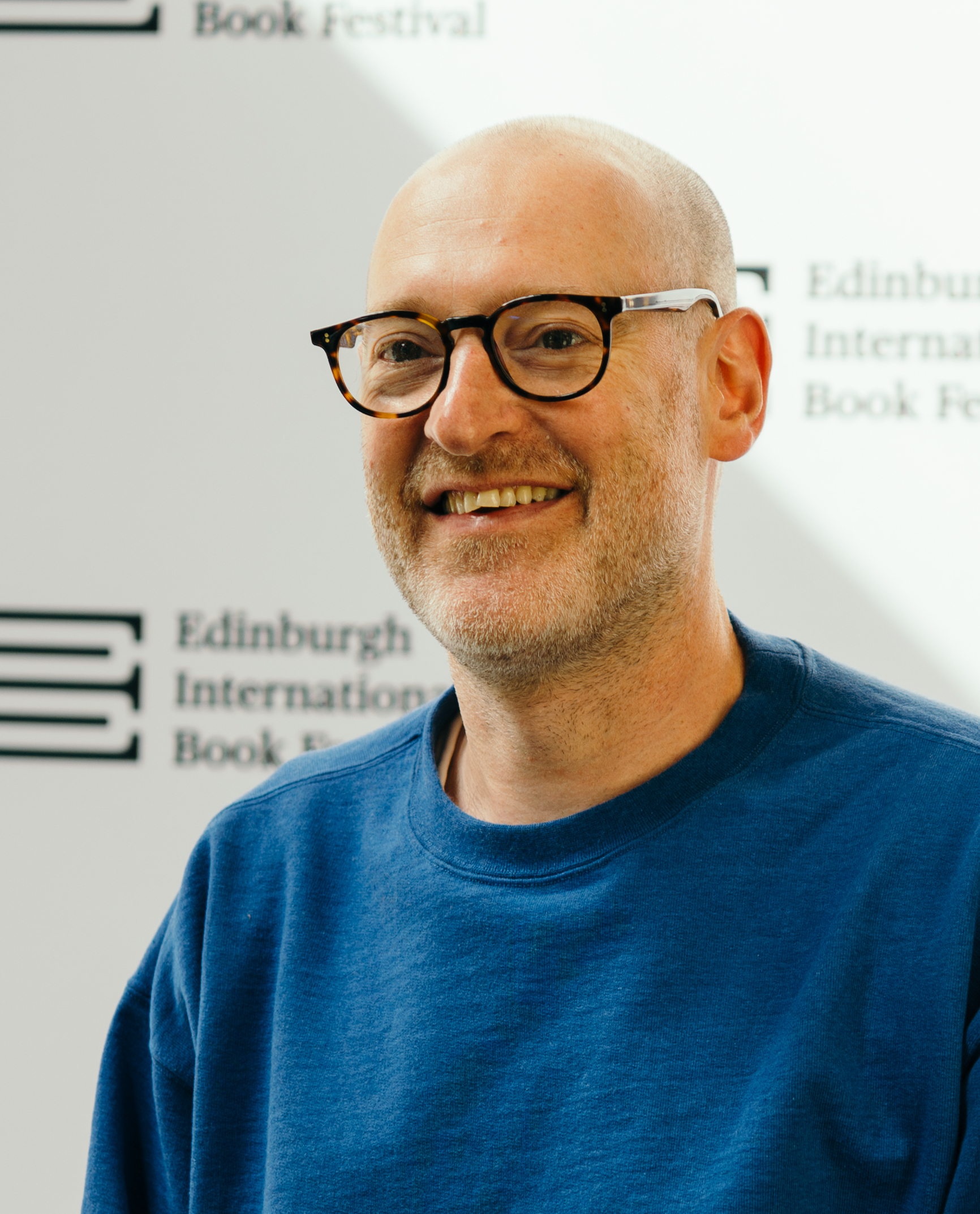
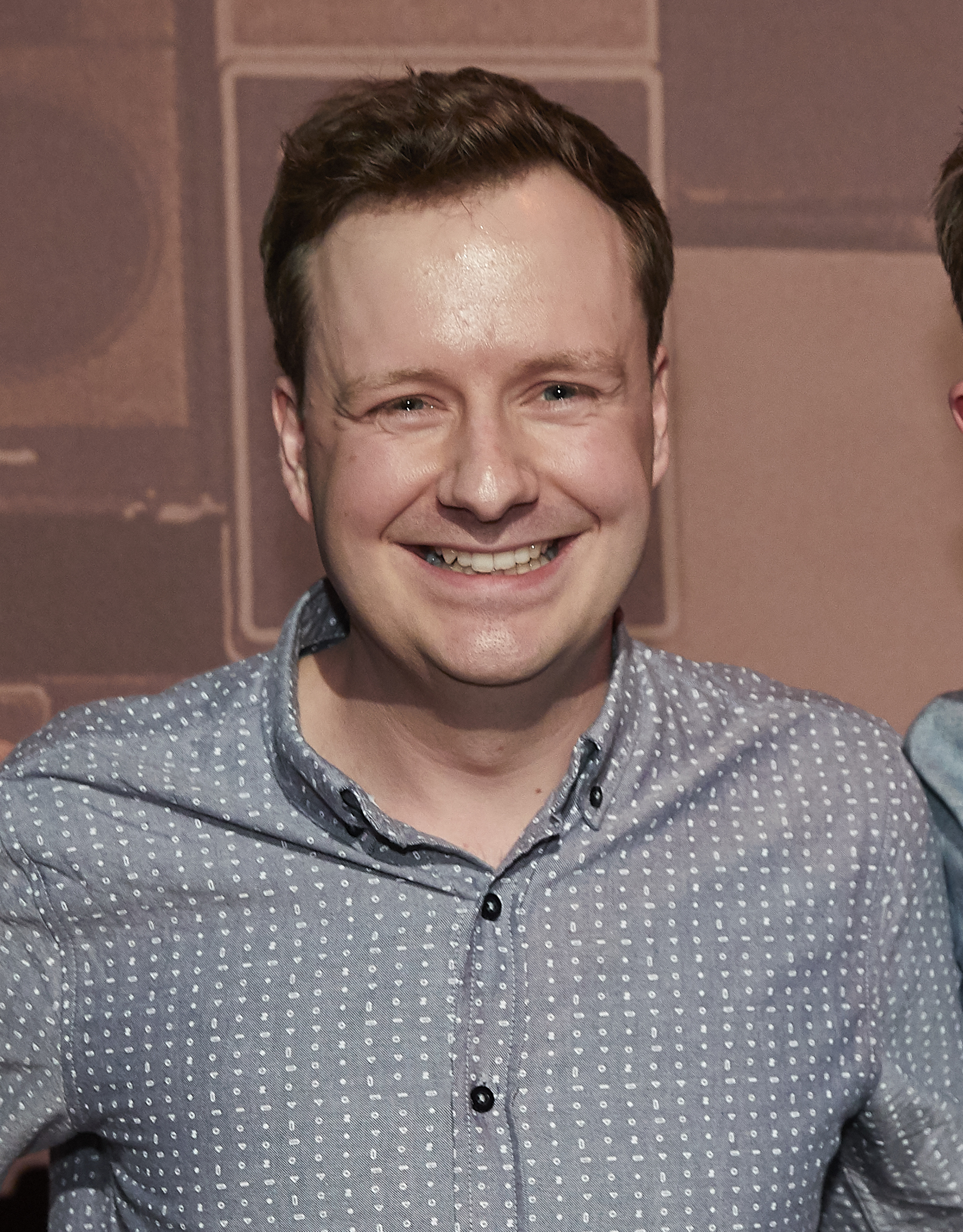
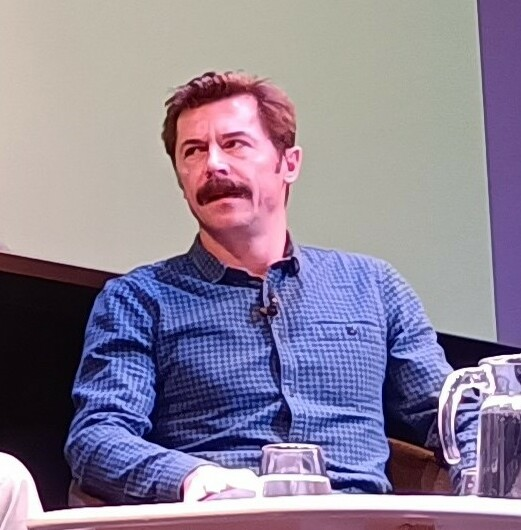
Henry Paker, Benjamin Partridge and Mike Wozniak

The show is a conversational podcast in which the three comedians "riff on a different theme" each episode, the themes being submitted by listeners. Topics have included biscuits, urban myths, whales, pencils, and time travel. While the episode's content is theoretically determined by the theme, it is not uncommon for conversation to drift, often dramatically, from the listener's suggestion.

The podcast is interspersed with jingles created by Partridge, which mark recurring segments, such as listener emails or frequently used topics such as Nigel Havers and flightless birds. Many episodes end with a different listener-submitted cover version of the show's theme tune with the regular jingles occasionally replaced by listener cover versions.

The podcast has staged a number of live performances, including at the Machynlleth Comedy Festival,, the London Podcast Festival and a 2025 UK tour.

== Critical response ==
The podcast has been described as "whimsical, cutting and downright hilarious" escapism, with "easy rapport between its likeable hosts" and a "variety of impressive jingles". Writing in November 2022, Patricia Nicol in The Sunday Times described it as a "Pythonesque cult comedy show" and called it a "shaft of daft light amid the gloom." India Rakusen in The List in July 2023, described it as "absolute nonsense; it’s utterly ridiculous and wonderful for it." Praise has come from fellow comedians with Rufus Hound telling Pod Bible Mag in January 2024, that it has him "regularly laughing inappropriately on public transport", and John Robins writing in The List magazine that "getting to hear their brains all working together on zeitgeist topics such as submarines or flightless birds always makes me howl". Wozniak's appearance on Taskmaster led to an increase in people listening to the podcast.

=== Awards ===
In March 2024, it won in the Best Podcast category at the Chortle Awards.

== Series overview ==
Series	Episodes	Originally released	
Series	Episodes	First released	Last released
1	10 + 2	27 April 2021	11 August 2021
2	10	18 August 2021	20 October 2021
3	8 + 2	1 December 2021	2 February 2022
4	8 + 2	2 March 2022	3 May 2022
5	8 + 2	1 June 2022	3 August 2022
6	8 + 2	7 September 2022	2 November 2022
7	8 + 2	7 December 2022	1 February 2023
8	8 + 2	1 March 2023	3 May 2023
9	8 + 1	7 June 2023	1 August 2023
10	8 + 1	6 September 2023	1 November 2023
11	8 + 2	6 December 2023	7 February 2024
12	8 + 1	6 March 2024	1 May 2024
13	8 + 2	5 June 2024	7 August 2024
14	8 + 2	4 September 2024	6 November 2024
15	8 + 2	4 December 2024	5 February 2025
16	8 + 2	5 March 2025	7 May 2025

The podcast is the subject of a dedicated fan wiki, which includes detailed summaries of each episode.
