= We Are Not Alone (2022 film) =

2022 British film

- Genre: Science fiction Comedy
- Created by: Laurence Rickard; Ben Willbond
- Written by: Laurence Rickard; Ben Willbond
- Directed by: Fergal Costello
- Starring: Declan Baxter; Georgia May Foote; Bruce MacKinnon; Evelyn Mok; Laurence Rickard; Joe Thomas; Ben Willbond; Mike Wozniak; Rob Delaney; Miles Jupp; Lucien Leon Laviscount; Ellie White; Dane Baptiste; Vicki Pepperdine; Amanda Abbington
- Country of origin: United Kingdom
- Original language: English

Production
- Executive producers: Kenton Allen; Matthew Justice; Victoria Grew; Laurence Rickard; Ben Willbond
- Producer: Philip Leach
- Running time: 90 minutes (exc. adverts)
- Production company: Big Talk Productions

Original release
- Network: Dave
- Release: 28 November 2022

We Are Not Alone is a 2022 British science-fiction comedy television film co-created and co-written by Laurence Rickard and Ben Willbond. Starring Declan Baxter, Georgia May Foote, Bruce Mackinnon, Evelyn Mok, Rickard, Joe Thomas, Willbond, Mike Wozniak, Vicki Pepperdine and Amanda Abbington, it was broadcast on Dave on 28 November 2022. It follows a group of aliens who have invaded and conquered Earth as they try to maintain control with their new subjects.

== Plot ==
Mild-mannered and hapless council worker Stewart gets enlisted into helping three members of the Gu'un alien race – who have taken over Earth – set up their rule of the United Kingdom in the buildings of the Clitheroe Borough Council, while being tempted by the Anti-Alien Alliance (AAA) determined to overthrow them. Stewart tries to cope between the widely different approaches to ruling among the three Gu'uns, by attempting – with fluctuating success – to ingratiate them to the British people, and avoid at all costs the ultimate fate of getting flushed into space.

== Cast ==
- Declan Baxter as Stewart, an unambitious, self-effacing council worker who by chance ends up as the assistant to the three aliens that claim control of Britain
- Vicki Pepperdine as 'Trater', the head of the alien force ruling the United Kingdom, known as 'Territory 78', believing the way to acceptance of their rule is through appealing to the masses.
- Mike Wozniak as 'Gordan', the less hospitable member of the Gu'un clan, determined to rule with an iron fist and take a more militaristic approach to rule.
- Joe Thomas as 'Greggs', the hapless, more substantially subordinate, member of the alien clan, who is instructed to shadow Stewart.
- Georgia May Foote as Elodie, the no-nonsense owner of the local pub
- Amanda Abbington as Caroline Grieves, former Defence Secretary prior to the alien invasion
- Evelyn Mok as Hodge, the in-house, apathetic, tech expert at the council, always irritated by the unreliable internet connection in the building.
- Bruce Mackinnon as Wade, the idealist head of the anti-Alien Alliance
- Lucien Laviscount as Robbie, the best friend of Stewart who is killed in the invasion, after being crushed by a Gu'un holographic object
- Laurence Rickard and Ben Willbond as Cirsch and Darrenth, two aliens who hold guard of the council building where the Gu'uns have made the capital.
- Dane Baptiste as Jordan Kane, a talk show host that gets the aliens' blame for 'Greggs''s disastrous appearance
- Rob Delaney as Bradel, the alien who becomes head of 'Territory 3', the United States.
- Ellie White as Sredstev, the alien who overthrows, and becomes the head of, the government of 'Territory 1', Russia.
- Miles Jupp as the deposed British Prime Minister

== Production ==
Commissioned in November 2021, filming took place in Castlegate, Clitheroe in December 2021, with the casting released later that month.

It was confirmed in October 2022, that, for creators Rickard and Willbond, the film is effectively a pilot for a potential further run of episodes. Some ideas for the programme had to be shelved when the pitch for the show "changed from a conventional sitcom pilot to a feature-length special", but are "sitting ready" in case of a series order.

The creators were "keen" for prosthetics to be used to give actors an alien appearance, as they "knew that world and knew what you could and couldn't get away with," according to Rickard, who employs a "similarly elaborate get-up" for his character on Ghosts, which he co-writes, along with Willbond. He then added that prosthetic usage means that "there's so much you can still see, you capture the performance, which is obviously so important in comedy," although how it would look on-screen was an initial concern during filming.

In June 2023, it was confirmed that UKTV had passed on ordering a full series from the pilot film.

== International broadcast ==
The film was distributed internationally by BBC Studios. It was released in the United States via streaming platform The Roku Channel on 27 January 2023, with a trailer released on multiple social media platforms two weeks prior. The film was made available in New Zealand on streaming platform TVNZ+, but split into three parts.

== Reception ==
=== Viewership ===
Across its two-hour runtime, the special recorded an average overnight audience of 163,000 (1.3%), below the 230,000 (1.8%) slot average. After a week's worth of catch-up, it improved to 267,000 viewers, becoming Dave's third most-watched programme of the week.

=== Critical reception ===
In a three-star review for The Daily Telegraph, Anita Singh praised Baxter, calling him "charming as the bewildered lead", but opined that the "central gag [of] aliens in a mundane British setting ... wears thin quite quickly", and accuses the writers of being "left casting around for a plot to keep things moving", with subplot storylines, including one which explores a potential romance between Stewart and Elodie, not "get[ting] out of second gear, but Baxter's likeability keeps things chugging along".

Laura Vickers-Green from Den of Geek was more positive, in a four-star review, commenting that "[t]here is so much humour packed into [the show that] it really feels like they were ruthless with the script: there's simply not a line wasted. From wry observations on the general daftness of human behaviour to clever digs at politics ... plus superb physical comedy ... it's just one big laugh after another, with "forays into more scatalogical humour ... almost undermin[ing] just how clever the rest of the show is". Vickers-Green did critique the ending, saying the show came "crashing to a halt without a whiff of a resolution", and, without further episodes being commissioned, "could be an awkward end for an otherwise triumphant effort".

Steve Bennett's three-and-a-half-star review for Chortle called the show "thoroughly engaging", and that it "says something about the likability of your cast when Mike Wozniak plays the bad guy", however pointed to how "[o]utright jokes take second billing to the story ... so it's more smileworthy than laugh-out-loud".

=== Future ===
In June 2023, UKTV confirmed they would not be commissioning a full series.
