= Man Down (TV series) =

UK television sitcom

- Genre: Sitcom; Farce; Slapstick; Screwball comedy
- Created by: Greg Davies
- Written by: Greg Davies; Stephen Morrison; Sian Harries; Andrew Collins; Richard Herring
- Directed by: Matt Lipsey
- Starring: Greg Davies; Stephanie Cole; Rik Mayall; Roisin Conaty; Mike Wozniak; Gwyneth Powell; Deirdre Mullins; Tony Robinson; Steven Berkoff; Jeany Spark
- Opening theme: Man Down Theme
- Composers: Chris Egan; Bob Bradley
- Country of origin: United Kingdom
- Original language: English
- No. of series: 4
- No. of episodes: 26

Production
- Executive producers: James Taylor; Richard Allen-Turner; Jon Thoday; Toby Stevens
- Producer: Spencer Millman
- Editor: Charlie Phillips
- Running time: 25 minutes
- Production company: Avalon Television

Original release
- Network: Channel 4
- Release: 18 October 2013 – 29 November 2017

Man Down is a British sitcom that was broadcast from 18 October 2013 to 29 November 2017 on Channel 4. The series stars Greg Davies as Dan Davies, a man undergoing a midlife crisis.

Channel 4 commissioned an additional 25-minute Christmas special before the first series aired, and a second series was announced during Davies's live tour "The Back of My Mum's Head." Following Rik Mayall's death in June 2014, Davies met with Channel 4 to discuss the future of the show. It had been intended that Mayall's role in the second series would be more prominent than it had been previously. The series returned for a second Christmas special in 2014, a second series in 2015, a third in 2016, and a fourth in 2017.

The majority of scenes were filmed in and around Watford and South Oxhey, Hertfordshire.

== Plot ==
Forty-something Dan Davies lives with his parents, hates his job as head of drama at Sandalwood School and is suffering a midlife crisis. He frequents Bob's Cafe, where he meets up with Jo and Brian, his friends from school despite both being six years younger than him. His long-term girlfriend Naomi breaks up with him at the beginning of series 1 and he makes several failed attempts to win her back. From the Christmas specials through to the end of series 3, he pursues Emma, a young, highly attractive deputy headmistress. During series 4, they have a son together despite not being a couple.

== Cast ==
=== Main cast ===
- Greg Davies as Daniel "Dan" Davies
- Roisin Conaty as Jo Bellingham
- Mike Wozniak as Brian Clive Ames
- Gwyneth Powell as Polly Davies (Mum)
- Rik Mayall as Richard Davies (Dad) (series 1 - 2013 special)
- Deirdre Mullins as Naomi (series 1)
- Jeany Spark as Emma Lipsey
- Stephanie Cole as Nesta (2014 special – series 4)
- Verity Drew Firth as Lucy (Dan's niece, Dad's granddaughter)

=== Recurring cast ===
- Ashley McGuire as Shakira
- Madeleine Harris as Karen (series 1–3)
- Alfie Davis as Dennis (series 1–3)
- Frankie Akhurst as Robin (series 2–3)
- George Bothamley as Maurice (series 1)
- Geoffrey Sergison as Mickey Two Face
- Stephen Morrison as Tony the Community Officer
- Annette Badland as Mrs Wigmore (series 1–2)
- Ramon Tikaram as Dom (series 1–2)
- Daniel Adegboyega as Sam (series 2–4)
- Elliot Levey as Mr Hogan (series 2–4)
- Steven Berkoff as Mr Klackov (series 3)
- Mark Hamill as Bob (series 3)
- Tony Robinson as Daedalus aka 'Daddy' (series 3-4)
- Isy Suttie as Ally (series 3–4)
- Ruth Bratt as Carol (series 4)
- Rhianna Joy Hosmer as Josephine (series 4)
- Michael Bunani as Jason (series 4)
- Sam Hunt as Kevin (series 4)
- Max Gill as Gregory (series 4)

== Writers ==
- Greg Davies
- Stephen Morrison
- Sian Harries
- Ed Gamble
- Mike Wozniak
- Richard Herring (additional material)
- Andrew Collins (script editor)
- Barry Castagnola
- Lloyd Langford
- Roisin Conaty
- Carl Rice

== Episodes ==
=== Series overview ===
Series	Episodes	Originally released	
Series	Episodes	First released	Last released
1	6	18 October 2013	22 November 2013
Special 2	1	25 December 2013	
Special 1	1	23 December 2014	
2	6	1 June 2015	6 July 2015
3	6	13 July 2016	17 August 2016
4	6	25 October 2017	29 November 2017

=== Series 1 (2013) ===
No. overall	No. in series	Title	Original release date	Viewers (millions)
1	1	"It Never Rains"	18 October 2013	1.83
After losing his trousers, Dan goes to a tailor's to buy new ones, but is thrown out by the tailor when he sees that Dan is trouserless. Dan's girlfriend of six years, Naomi, is dissatisfied with him and ends their relationship. He hates his job as head of drama at Sandalwood School. His father Richard attacks him in his car whilst wearing a bear suit. His friends Brian and Jo try to help him.
2	2	"Mad Nobby"	25 October 2013	1.28
Dan fails in his attempt to win Naomi back. Richard tricks Dan into thinking that Dan killed a neighbour child's pet rabbit. Dan hires a welder known as Mad Nobby to fix his car, but he makes it worse.
3	3	"Desperate Dan"	1 November 2013	N/A
Richard tricks Dan into thinking he hit him with his car. Dan is disappointed to not be invited by his sister to her daughter's ninth birthday party, especially when he finds out that Naomi is invited. Desperate to impress Naomi and win the approval of his family, he persuades them that he can be trusted with getting the party ready. He collects the birthday cake, but his car is towed away with the cake inside. At the car pound, the cake is partially eaten by a guard dog whom an angry police community support officer (PSCO) sets on Dan.
4	4	"Guru"	8 November 2013	1.15
Richard throws water over Dan at 2 am while he is asleep. Dan takes up running and joins the jogging group that Brian is part of. Another member of the group is an eccentric guru, Dominic, who teaches Dan hypnosis. Jo is evicted as she has not paid her rent, and lives in a tent beside a road. She steals a frozen chicken from a shop and is arrested. At the police station, Dan hypnotises the same PCSO that he encountered in the previous episode into dropping the theft case against Jo. Naomi tells Dan that she is dating someone.
5	5	"Dad's Past"	15 November 2013	N/A
Richard dresses as the ghost of Naomi. Dan is asked on a date by a pupil's mother. He is pleased, but does not know what to do on a date, so goes on a mock date with Brian at a restaurant. There, Dan sees the woman on what he assumes is a date. That angers Dan, who responds by shouting at several people. The man is her probation officer and she cancels the date. Naomi and her new boyfriend are also there. Later, Dan has sex with cleaning lady Mrs Wigmore.
6	6	"Space Mission"	22 November 2013	N/A
Richard arranges for a horse to bite Dan's chest. Brian is nominated for a Small Business Award and Dan borrows a tuxedo from Richard to try to impress Naomi. Jo accompanies Dan, pretending to be an Irish businessman. Dan is angry that Brian does not win, and makes a speech to give his opinion. The speech is badly received, especially as the winner died recently.

=== Specials (2013–14) ===
No. overall	No. in series	Title	Original release date	Viewers (millions)
7	1	"Christmas Special 2013"	25 December 2013	N/A
Dan oversees the festive sci-fi school musical play, Scrooge 3000. Dan thinks the deputy headmistress, Emma Lipsey, is becoming attracted to him. Richard carries out his yuletide tradition of the 12 scares of Christmas against Dan.
8	2	"Christmas Special 2014 - Finding Nesta"	23 December 2014	1.03
After a difficult year, Dan thinks he has turned his life around. Richard has died and Dan's aunt Nesta was appointed by Richard to live with Dan as a condition of Dan inheriting his flat. Dan finds Nesta's eccentric personality and hostility difficult to deal with.

=== Series 2 (2015) ===
No. overall	No. in series	Title	Original release date	Viewers (millions)
9	1	"Perfect Woman"	1 June 2015	1.35
Brian researches his family tree and is initially disappointed to discover that his ancestors were binmen, but changes his mind and talks to a group of binmen who let him join them on their night round. They dislike his strict adherence to rules, so they tie him to the front of their lorry. Dan meets Lottie (Sara Vickers), a shy woman in her twenties, at the library and again at the gym. After an eventful evening out and at her request, they perform sexual roleplay at his flat in which he plays a greengrocer and she insults him for being working class.
10	2	"Kindness"	8 June 2015	1.29 total (1.10 million on Channel 4 and 191,000 on Channel 4 +1.)
Dan invites divorced Brian to move in with him, and soon regrets doing so. When a rival teacher delivers a popular school assembly, Dan conspires to top it with one of his own involving his drama class and a war veteran.
11	3	"Diversity"	15 June 2015	0.91
Dan is sent on a diversity course by Emma, the ongoing target of his clumsy advances, due to unintentionally offending a gay pupil with his lack of political correctness. Dan hires a male cleaner, who steals from the house. Jo gives makeovers at the hair salon so customers look like a cross between two very different celebrities. Nesta is preparing to go to a folk festival at Banbury as a blackface Morris dancer.
12	4	"The Phant"	22 June 2015	0.87
Dan has an appraisal at work, and fate throws him into the path of his childhood nemesis. Jo has a new money-making scheme, and Brian is determined to be published.
13	5	"Dennis"	29 June 2015	0.86
After sad news from pupil Dennis' family, Dan, primarily motivated by impressing Emma, volunteers to look after the boy for a weekend.
14	6	"The Heath"	6 July 2015	0.86
After Jo announces she is marrying a digger-driving rapper from a 'pagan backwater', Dan decides he will use his best man's speech to impress Emma.

=== Series 3 (2016) ===
No. overall	No. in series	Title	Original release date	Viewers (millions)
15	1	"The Heist"	13 July 2016	1.60
Dan must do something as he faces a disciplinary hearing and may lose his teaching job.
16	2	"The Calling"	20 July 2016	1.33
Dan meets Ally Clarke, his replacement in class. Jo pitches her new shop 'idea' to the town council, while 'Daddy' continues to charm Dan's mother Polly.
17	3	"Big News"	27 July 2016	1.04
Dan struggles to get his 'news' taken seriously, Brian meets the woman of his dreams, Nesta has a big problem to deal with, and 'Daddy' takes things up a gear with Dan.
18	4	"The Visa"	3 August 2016	1.24
Dan tries to keep his plan to emigrate to the USA moving, but with the complicated issue of a visa to negotiate he knows he needs to draw on all his inner strength.
19	5	"Adopted"	10 August 2016	0.97
Dan is shocked to discover that his parents put him up for adoption and that his prospective adoptive parents gave him back. He goes to Southend-on-Sea, where the now-elderly Irish couple live. Jo, Brian and Brian's two daughters accompany him. Dan finds them and they tell him that they were happier without him. The couple then die whilst sat on a bench with Dan on the seafront.
20	6	"The Party"	17 August 2016	0.82
Dan's teaching career is reduced to few words in his final school assembly. Jo is in charge of organising an impressive party, but will everything go to plan? Emma tells Dan via webcam that she is pregnant.

=== Series 4 (2017) ===
On 8 November 2016 Greg Davies officially confirmed the renewal of the show for a fourth series consisting of six episodes.

No. overall	No. in series	Title	Original release date	Viewers (millions)
21	1	"The Home"	25 October 2017	0.85
Dan quits his job as a teacher and applies his unique work ethic to a new profession. With Nesta and Polly in a retirement village, Dan is on a hunt to find his soon-to-be family a home.
22	2	"The Bear"	1 November 2017	0.78
Dan presents Emma with a perfect vision of a family and embarks on a journey to rediscover a terrible truth about a misremembered friendship.
23	3	"The Dad Club"	8 November 2017	0.70
Dan is frustrated by the universal lack of respect for his new status as a father, and joins a dads' club. Desperate to fit in, how far will he go to impress the other dads?
24	4	"The School Trip"	15 November 2017	0.61
Dan takes his Behavioural Unit on a historical school trip with desperate hopes of becoming a 'bright light' his troubled kids can follow.
25	5	"The Christening"	22 November 2017	N/A
Dan is pleased when a health visitor suggests a 'daddy day'. But when his son seems a bit cold towards him, Dan becomes increasingly desperate to establish a bond.
26	6	"The Hearing"	29 November 2017	0.48
Dan races against the clock to prove his credentials as a father, but Daedalus returns to seek revenge.

=== Cancellation ===
In 2017, Channel 4 announced it would not be renewing Man Down for a fifth series.

== International broadcast ==
The series premiered in Australia on 12 January 2015 on SBS One.
