= MacAulay and Co =

BBC Radio Scotland daily magazine

MacAulay and Co. is a daily magazine show on BBC Radio Scotland. The programme was presented by comedian Fred MacAulay with a different guest presenter each week, and featured a range of guests including journalists, musicians, comedians and members of the public.

During the season of the Edinburgh Fringe, the programme was often also syndicated onto national BBC radio.
