= Ankle Tag =

UK radio program

- Genre: Situation comedy
- Running time: 30 minutes
- Country of origin: United Kingdom
- Language(s): English
- Home station: BBC Radio 4
- Starring: Elis James; Katy Wix; Steve Speirs; Margaret Cabourn-Smith
- Written by: Gareth Gwynn and Benjamin Partridge
- Produced by: Victoria Lloyd
- Original release: November 2015
- No. of series: 3
- No. of episodes: 14 (including pilot)
- Audio format: Stereophonic sound

Ankle Tag is a situation comedy series which aired on BBC Radio 4 in 2017 and 2018. The show was aired as a pilot in November 2015 before two series were broadcast from August 2017. It stars Elis James, Katy Wix and Steve Speirs, and was written by Gareth Gwynn and Benjamin Partridge. Series 3 started on 28 May 2020.

== Cast ==
- Elis James as Gruff Evans
- Katy Wix / Margaret Cabourn-Smith as Alice Bishop
- Steve Speirs as Bob Evans

Katy Wix appeared as Alice in the pilot, all episodes of series one and first two episodes of series two. Margaret Cabourn-Smith took over the role of Alice for the final two episodes of series two. Wix returned as Alice for the third series.

== Plot ==
Gruff (Elis James) and wife Alice (Katy Wix) live with their one-year-old daughter Carys. They receive a surprise when Gruff's ex-convict father Bob (Steve Speirs) is released on licence from a fraud conviction, and cons his way into living with them.

== Episodes ==
=== Pilot ===
No. overall	No. in series	Title	Original release date
1	1	"The Beginning"	18 November 2015
Bob, paroled from prison, cons his way into living with his son Gruff and daughter-in-law Alice. Gruff worries this will affect his chances of being commissioned to write a newspaper column.

=== Series One ===
No. overall	No. in series	Title	Original release date
2	1	"The Date"	30 August 2017
Bob gets a date with a woman he meets in a museum, while Gruff is writing a newspaper article about smoothies. Alice joins the local neighbourhood watch scheme.
3	2	"The Plumber"	6 September 2017
The bath is leaking, and Gruff decides to hire an ethical plumber while Bob suggests his friend Terry. Bob and Alice also bond over ape-based reality show "Monkey World".
4	3	"The Church"	13 September 2017
Bob gets a job as a bingo caller. Gruff and Alice decide on getting Carys baptised to ensure she can get a place in the local Roman Catholic school in the future.

=== Series Two ===
No. overall	No. in series	Title	Original release date
5	1	"The Charity Gig"	31 October 2018
Bob gets the chance to catch-up with a fellow prison resident, Richard Flint, a former MP who has written a book about his time inside.
6	2	"The Nappy Advert"	7 November 2018
Gruff laments having to leave Carys with Alice's sister Lauren. When Bob spots Carys in a nappy advert, he senses an opportunity to blackmail Lauren.
7	3	"The Falklands"	14 November 2018
Alice's mother has a new boyfriend, however Bob suspects that the guy is a conman. He puts his knowledge of the Falkland Islands war to use.
8	4	"The All-nighter"	21 November 2018
Alice has an interview for a promotion, while Gruff has an early start by presenting a segment on local radio, requiring both to try and get a good night's sleep.

=== Series Three ===
No. overall	No. in series	Title	Original release date
9	1	"Bob's Dad"	28 May 2020
Bob meets his father, and has to pretend to be a barrister. Gruff also tries to make up for his past in an attempt to break the criminal streak in his family.
10	2	"Housesitting"	4 June 2020
Gruff and Alice are house-sitting for a wealthy neighbour, and use the opportunity, at Bob's suggestion, to try to impress two of Alice's successful school friends.
11	3	"The Guest"	11 June 2020
Gruff is commissioned to write film festival movie reviews for the newspaper, and Alice sets about accommodating a film director who comes to stay with them.
12	4	"The Bike"	18 June 2020
Alice is attending an assertiveness training course for work, and Gruff unwisely decides to take up cycling in an attempt to improve his health.
13	5	"Doppelganger"	25 June 2020
Alice has competition for the lead role in an amateur drama, while Bob takes to making use of his doppelganger at his new barman job and on a date.
14	6	"Gruff's Mum"	2 July 2020
Bob's ex-wife Barbara comes to visit, and he sets about planning a reconciliation. However, her husband and his arresting officer Derek is in the way.

== Broadcast history ==
A pilot episode entitled The Beginning was first aired on 18 November 2015.

Three episodes making up series one were broadcast from the 30 August 2017. A second series of four episodes were broadcast weekly from the 31 October 2018. The third series, consisting of six episodes, was aired from 28 May 2020.

Repeats have been aired on both BBC Radio 4 Extra and BBC Radio Wales.

== Critical reaction ==
Gillian Reynolds in The Daily Telegraph wrote that the pilot episode "had an original and promising situation".

It also received a nomination for the Best Scripted Comedy at the BBC Audio Drama Awards in 2017.
