= Mike Wozniak =

British comedian (born 1979)

- Wozniak in 2026
- Born: Michael James Wozniak; 8 November 1979 (age 46); Oxford, Oxfordshire, England
- Education: St George's, University of London (MBBS)
- Occupations: Comedian, writer, actor, former medical doctor
- Years active: 1990s–present
- Notable work: Man Down

Michael James Wozniak (born 8 November 1979) is a British comedian, writer, actor and former medical doctor. He portrays Brian in the Channel 4 sitcom Man Down and is a member of the team that makes Small Scenes for BBC Radio 4.

== Early life ==
Wozniak was born in Oxford, was raised in Portsmouth, and has a twin sister. He has Polish and Welsh ancestry.

== Education ==
Wozniak was educated at Portsmouth Grammar School.

He studied medicine at St George's, University of London and worked as a doctor for several years before pursuing comedy.

== Career ==
Wozniak worked doing live sketch comedy starting in the late 1990s, and began stand-up comedy in 2007.

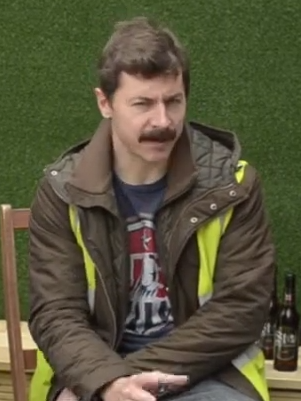
Wozniak at Edinburgh Festival Fringe 2013

He won the Amused Moose Laugh-Off contest at the Edinburgh Festival Fringe in 2008. He was nominated for the comedy newcomer award the same year. Wozniak performed at the Adelaide Fringe in 2009. Wozniak was nominated for the Edinburgh Best Comedy Show in 2013.

=== Television ===
Wozniak's first major role in television came when he was cast in the series Man Down in 2013, alongside Greg Davies, who created and starred in the show. He played strait-laced financial adviser Brian, a friend of Davies' character.

In 2015, he wrote physical comedy Ruby Robinson for Sky Arts. It starred Kim Cattrall and a troupe of acrobats.

Wozniak appeared and came second in series 11 of Taskmaster, which started broadcast in March 2021. He has a long history with Taskmaster, having won the original Edinburgh Fringe version of the show in 2010. In 2024, he was the assistant to Taskmaster Rose Matafeo in Junior Taskmaster.

In April 2023, he appeared on The Great Celebrity Bake Off as part of Channel 4's Stand Up to Cancer fundraiser.

=== Film ===
In 2016, Wozniak played the role of Josh in Alice Lowe's Prevenge.

Wozniak made his directorial debut with a dramedy entitled Sump, released in 2017 and screened at various film festivals. The film has a 14-minute run time and features a character named Sally, played by Jeany Spark, whose husband is trapped in a cave with others.

In 2022, Wozniak played the alien Gordan in the science fiction comedy film We Are Not Alone.

=== Podcasts ===
On his St. Elwick's Neighbourhood Association Newsletter Podcast, Wozniak plays the role of host Malcolm Durridge. The show focuses on the neighbourhood association newsletter of St Elwick's, a fictional ward of Exeter, forced through budgetary cuts to change from a printed edition to the "cheapest alternative": a podcast.

Wozniak also appears frequently in different roles on the Beef and Dairy Network Podcast, ten episodes of which were broadcast on BBC Radio 4 in 2017–2018.

In 2021, he started Three Bean Salad with Henry Paker and Benjamin Partridge. In March 2024, it won the Best Comedy Podcast at the Chortle Awards.

=== Radio ===
Wozniak has appeared frequently in Tim Key's Poetry Programme as a character called Jiffy, notably in the episodes "Accountancy" and "Cuisine".

== Filmography ==
Title	Year	Actor	Writer	Role	Notes
Comedy Lab	2010	Yes		Various	
Gary: Tank Commander	2011	Yes		Bradshaw	
Stand Up for the Week	2012		Yes		
Live at the Electric	2012	Yes		Various	
It's Kevin	2013	Yes		Various	
Man Down	2013–2017	Yes	Yes	Brian	Writer for various episodes in this series.
Badults	2014	Yes		Harry	
Lovesick	2014	Yes		Doctor	
Crims	2015	Yes		Photographer	
Josh	2015–2016	Yes		Phil	
Walliams & Friend	2015–2016	Yes		Various	
Drunk History	2015–2017	Yes		Various	
Prevenge	2016	Yes		Josh	
The Moonstone	2016	Yes		Superintendent Seegrave	
Horrible Histories: The Movie – Rotten Romans	2019	Yes		Owen Bowen	
Dial M for Middlesbrough	2019	Yes		Neil	
Taskmaster	2021	Yes		Himself	Series 11; Runner-up
Richard Osman's House of Games	2021–2022	Yes		Himself	Weekly winner
We Are Not Alone	2022	Yes		Gordan	
The Great Stand Up to Cancer Bake Off	2023	Yes		Himself	Contestant
Junior Taskmaster	2024	Yes		Self - Host/Assistant	
Timestalker	2024	Yes		Dan Chovy	
Not Going Out	2025	Yes		Will	
