= Guerilla Cricket =

Guerilla Cricket is an Internet radio site that broadcasts commentaries of cricket matches internationally, as a separate entity from those produced by official organisations such as the BBC. It was set up in 2014 up by alumni of Test Match Sofa, an earlier alternative commentary site. Broadcasts have emanated from a variety of sites in London, where the commentators describe the television coverage to listeners, while engaging in wide ranging discussion of the cricket and anything else taking their fancy.

Since international cricket has returned following the COVID-19 pandemic, the site has utilized Zoom to ensure that its commentators are socially distant while continuing to provide commentary. This has allowed the use of commentators based outside of England, including Australia, Singapore, and the United States.

== Ireland vs Pakistan ==
Guerilla Cricket successfully bid for the exclusive radio rights to Ireland's inaugural Test match against Pakistan, beating both the BBC and Talksport to be the official radio partners of Cricket Ireland. The game was held at Malahide, near Dublin, from May 11–15, 2018. It was the first time the team commentated live from the match itself.

== Coverage ==
While initially focused on England's international cricket matches, the service has developed over a number of years to cover major series involving India, Pakistan, Australia and South Africa, as well as World Cup and IPL T20 cricket. Perhaps the most unusual coverage was of the Under 19 World Cup game between England and Namibia.

== Sense of humour ==
Guerilla Cricket is known for its sense of humour, irreverence and surrealism, in sharp contrast to the formal nature of official broadcasts such as Test Match Special. Its method of operation puts it beyond the reach of the game's controlling body in England, the England and Wales Cricket Board, and it is unlikely that any current test players would be allowed to appear. The site has benefited from social media in its commentary, unlike traditional, one-way, broadcasting, which allows an exchange of information. A fan of the site has been seen wearing a gorilla costume at matches.

== UK General Elections ==
As well as providing cricket commentary, Guerilla Cricket also provided on-air coverage of the UK General Elections in 2015 and 2017, providing their usual irreverent views as events unfolded. Key events were marked with musical jingles provided by James Sherwood who has provided a number of songs which are used within the cricket commentary, including the Guerilla Cricket theme tune.

== Fundraising appeals ==
A number of appeals have enabled Guerilla Cricket to remain on-air and broadcast worldwide free commentary. In July 2015, the site ran a successful Kickstarter campaign to raise £3,000 to broadcast the 2015 Ashes series live from the Jetlag Bar in London. A subsequent campaign the following winter raised over £5,000 to broadcast test series in the United Arab Emirates and South Africa. More recently, a campaign has raised nearly £3,000 to enable the team to cover Ireland's inaugural Test match.
