= Felix Riley =

British novelist, screenwriter, producer, and entrepreneur

- Born: Graham D. Riley; Essex, United Kingdom
- Education: University of Edinburgh
- Occupations: Novelist, screenwriter, producer, entrepreneur
- Children: 2
- Writing career
- Pen name: Felix Riley
- Language: English
- Genres: Thriller and comedy
- Notable works: The Set Up, The Inside Job
- Notable awards: BBC Radio Comedy Writers Bursary
- Website: felixriley.com

Felix Riley is a full-time British writer living in East Molesey, Surrey. Notable works include The Set Up and The Inside Job.

== Early life and studies ==
Riley was born in Essex and began his studies in Mental Philosophy at the University of Edinburgh, graduating in 1993.

== Early comedy writing career ==
Riley began his comedy career on the BBC Radio 4 satire show Week Ending. His involvement ran from 1993 through to 1998, including one year as Script Associate and recipient of the BBC Radio Comedy Writers Bursary.

Some of the other radio credits during this time include The Zoë Ball Radio 1 Breakfast Show as a member of the show's posse, Cross Talk (BBC Radio 4) as Producer/writer/creator, the Simon Mayo Show (BBC Radio 1), The Scott Mill's Breakfast Show (BBC Radio 1), The Chris Moyles Show (Radio 1), Xmas Panto (BBC Radio 4 1999 with Robbie Coltrane, R. Wilson, C. Anderson, Diana Rigg, Miriam Margolyes and N. Hancock), The News Quiz (BBC Radio 4), and The News Huddlines (BBC Radio 2).

Television credits during this time included, amongst others, The Rory Bremner Show (C4), The 11 O'Clock Show (C4), The Lily Savage Show (Carlton), and The Big Breakfast (Channel 4).

Riley partnered with the comedy writer Simon Littlefield during much of this time as well as performing stand-up in the mid-1990s, appearing at, amongst other venues, The Comedy Store.

== City and entrepreneurial career ==
In 2003 Riley took a break from writing from which he didn’t know if he would return. He gained a job at the leading American brokerage Cantor Fitzgerald where he joined the sales team of their financial spread betting arm, Cantor Index. In 2006 he launched his own financial binary betting firm, ChoiceOdds, which he sold fifteen months later to the American brokerage firm MF Global where he became Managing Director of his division.

== Credits ==
=== Novels ===
Having worked in finance in London at the height of the Credit Crunch Riley was struck not only by what he saw as the criminal nature of it but also the lack of understanding amongst the wider public. Inspired by this he set out to write a book that, whilst a high-octane thriller, would explain exactly what the Credit Crunch was – and why it was a scam perpetrated by the banks. That book was The Set Up, published by Michael Joseph, a Penguin Books imprint. It was the first in his Mike Byrne series which also includes the follow-up The Inside Job.

=== Politics ===
In 2016 he stood unsuccessfully as a Labour candidate in the Elmbridge Borough council elections for the ward of Claygate.

=== Podcasts ===
Felix was interviewed for the Turning The Tables podcast in 2019 where he shared his unusual past with host Simon Ratcliffe.
