= Spats (radio series) =

British radio comedy sketch series

Spats is a British radio comedy sketch series broadcast on digital radio station BBC 7. The series is written and presented by John-Luke Roberts (credited as Luke Roberts in the first series), with additional material written by Nadia Kamil. Kamil also stars in the show, alongside Stephen Critchlow and Clare Wille. The series first started as a pilot, first broadcast on 11 December 2006.

Each episode of Spats looks at two sides of some kind of argument. Examples include "Religion v Atheism (and Other Religions)", "Love v Something Better" and "The Living vs The Dead". Each episode then presents a series of sketches, consisting of what Roberts himself describes as "perfectly adequate sketch comedy" concerning the themes. At the end of each episode, one of the sides is declared by Roberts the winner.

== Episodes ==
Including the pilot, there have been nine episodes broadcast, with a third series commissioned. The third series see the winning themes from the second series facing the winners from the first and the pilot. The second series was recorded in front of a studio audience, whereas the first series and pilot were not. Also, the second series has episodes which last 30 minutes, whereas the pilot and first series episodes were 15 minutes.

=== List of episodes ===
Episode	Air Date	Winner
Pilot and Series 1 - 2006-2007
1. Pilot: Mankind v Nature	2006-12-11	Mankind
2. Science v The Arts	2007-07-20	The Arts
3. Religion v Atheism (and Other Religions)	2007-07-27	Atheism (and Other Religions)
4. The Present v Ye Past	2007-08-03	Ye Past
5. Love v Something Better	2007-08-10	Something Better
Series 2 - 2008
6. Society vs The Individual	2008-07-08	The Individual
7. Men vs Women	2008-07-15	Women
8. Apathy vs Effort	2008-07-22	Apathy
9. The Living vs The Dead	2008-07-29	The Dead
