= Paul Powell (writer) =

British comedy writer and producer (born 20th century)

Paul Powell (born 20th century) is a British comedy writer and producer, known for his work on Miranda, Al Murray's Happy Hour and Smack the Pony.

== Education ==
Powell attended St Edmund Hall at the University of Oxford, where he studied English literature and performed in The Oxford Revue alongside film director Richard Bracewell.

== Career ==
He started his career in 1991 by writing sketches for the BBC Radio 4 series Week Ending before joining the writing team for Spitting Image – a satirical television puppet show – where he collaborated with Georgia Pritchett, Kevin Cecil and Andy Riley.

In 1995, he worked with Dan Gaster, writing and performing in two series of the Radio 4 sketch show We Know Everything.

With Dan Gaster, Will Ing and Ben Silburn, he wrote and performed in Stuff the Week, a late-night topical comedy show for ITV.

His television work includes Miranda, Alexander Armstrong's Big Ask, Al Murray's Happy Hour, Have I Got News for You, Mock the Week, Would I Lie to You, Smith & Jones, The One Griff, TV to Go, The Guest List, Top Gear, Text Santa, Doctor Who Live: The Next Doctor and co-writing two episodes of Life of Riley.

"Saying Goodbye" – which he wrote for Smack the Pony – was named "Best Comedy Moment" 2003 by BBC One and the 39th-greatest comedy sketch by Channel 4.

His radio work includes The Griff Rhys Jones Show, It's Your Round, The Now Show, Robin and Wendy's Wet Weekends, Dead Ringers, The Lee Mack Show, Loose Ends and The Christmas Nativity for BBC Radio 1.

Writing work for live shows includes the Nelson Mandela 90th Birthday Tribute in Hyde Park, the Diamond Jubilee Concert at Buckingham Palace and The Sound of Change Live Concert at Twickenham Stadium in 2013. He was on the creative team for the Miranda Hart My, What I Like to Call, Live Show.

He has made several appearances at the Greenbelt Festival and contributed to Third Way magazine.

Powell is a non-executive director of the Authors' Licensing and Collecting Society, a co-opted committee member of The Wine Society and a creative director of Black Dog Television, which he founded with Dan Gaster and Will Ing.

He co-wrote the best-selling book Top Gear: Alternative Highway Code.

== See also ==
- List of British writers
