= John-Luke Roberts =

British stand-up comedian, writer, actor and performer

- Roberts in 2026
- Occupations: Stand-up, actor, writer
- Website: www.johnlukeroberts.co.uk

John-Luke Roberts is a British stand-up comedian, writer, actor and performer.

He was named as one of the 50 funniest comedians of the 21st century in The Daily Telegraph in August 2023.

== Style ==
Roberts' comedy style is absurdist, and often uses props and physical movement, as taught by French clown Philippe Gaulier at École Philippe Gaulier with whom Roberts has trained. Roberts uses character comedy within his stand-up.

Roberts has had jokes nominated in the best and worst lists at the Edinburgh festival.

== Career ==
=== Early career ===
Roberts studied at the University of Cambridge where he was a member of the comedy society. Roberts took part in So You Think You're Funny, and in 2005 was a finalist in the BBC New Comedy Award.

Roberts founded The Alternative Comedy Memorial Society which he cohosted with Thom Tuck at the Edinburgh Festival Fringe, and which has had residencies at the Soho Theatre, The New Red Lion, and The Bill Murray.

=== Film, television, radio and podcasts ===
Roberts wrote the 2006 BBC 7 radio show Spats. Roberts has written for Have I Got News For You, Newzoids and Never Mind the Buzzcocks for the BBC TV as well as The News Quiz, Dilemma and Newsjack for BBC Radio 4. Roberts voiced the computer in Welcome to Our Village, Please Invade Carefully. In 2015 Roberts' sitcom Bull, co-written with Gareth Gwynn, aired on UKTV Gold, starring Robert Lindsay and Maureen Lipman.

In 2017, Roberts hosted The Tony Law Tapes podcast with Tony Law.

Roberts co-wrote The Goodies revival episode with Gareth Gwynn, Graeme Garden, Bill Oddie and Barnaby Eaton-Jones, which was available through Audible in 2019. Roberts wrote and appeared in the short film Asparagus Tips which included appearances by Cariad Lloyd and Margaret Cabourn-Smith and won Best Horror film at the 2019 Munich indie film festival. That year, he could also be seen as Klaus the German clown in the Emma Thompson and Paul Feig Christmas film Last Christmas.

He presented a documentary on the 1996 novel Infinite Jest by David Foster Wallace for BBC Radio 4, as part of the second series of the Exploding Library series, which first aired in December 2022.

He is the host of the podcast Sound Heap, which he co-created with producer Ed Morrish, it won the BBC Audio Drama Award for Best Sketch Comedy in 2022. The podcast is semi-improvised and semi-written, by John-Luke and a long list of guests including Tom Allen, Isy Suttie and Deborah Frances-White.

Roberts has been a guest on The Comedian's Comedian with Stuart Goldsmith. and has appeared as a guest on comedy podcast Do the Right Thing. He has also guested on the Josie Long presented Radio 4 series Short Cuts, and Benjamin Partridge comedy series Beef And Dairy Network Podcast.

Roberts appeared in 2026 British supernatural comedy film Ghosts: The Possession of Button House.

=== Live performances ===
Roberts has performed numerous one man shows. His 2014 Edinburgh Fringe Festival show was entitled ‘Stnad-up’ and addressed his break-up with fellow comedian Nadia Kamil, and his 2015 Edinburgh show ‘Stdad-up’ addressed the death of his father. His 2018 show was All I Wanna do is [FX: GUNSHOTS] with a [FX: GUN RELOADING] and a [FX: CASH REGISTER] and Perform Some Comedy! He followed that up with After Me Comes the Flood (But in French). In 2022 at the Edinburgh Fringe Festival he performed A World Just Like Our Own, But... and toured it internationally in 2023. Roberts international performances have included Adelaide, and Melbourne.

Roberts has created absurdist plays Terrible Wonderful Adaptations with fellow comedians such as Mark Watson and Kieran Hodgson, performed at the Edinburgh Festival. He has written and performed plays and sketches with Nadia Kamil under the name ‘The Behemoth’.

Robert's debut stand-up comedy album, It Is Better, was released in 2021 on Monkey Barrel Records.

Roberts has also directed live comedy, including Josh Glanc’s Vroom Vroom which ran in London and the Melbourne Comedy Festival in 2022, and the 2023 Be Well tour show of Myra DuBois. He performed as Al (short for Alisthair) in physical theatre company Spymonkey's production Hairy. Directed by founding members Toby Park and Aitor Basauri, it was the first children’s show presented by Spymonkey, and the first Spymonkey production not to feature the original cast.

He created the show Clownts, a competitive clown show, with Viggo Venn, Julia Masli and Sami Abu Wardeh. He created the show Cabaret Impedimenta with Harry Haddon and Kasia Fudakowski of The Art of the Palliative Turn in which cabaret acts have to try and perform their numbers, while a growing number of impediments try to make it impossible for them to do so.
