= I Guess That's Why They Call It The News =

British radio panel show

- Running time: 30 minutes
- Country of origin: United Kingdom
- Language: English
- Home station: BBC Radio 4
- Hosted by: Fred MacAulay
- Created by: James Sherwood
- Original release: 21 August – 18 September 2009
- No. of series: 1
- No. of episodes: 5

I Guess That's Why They Call It The News is a BBC Radio 4 satirical panel game hosted by Fred MacAulay and created by James Sherwood. The only series began broadcasting on 21 August 2009 and continued for five episodes.

== Format ==
A typical episode consists of 5 or 6 rounds.

=== What's the Story? ===
In What's The Story?, the host reads actual headlines from the week's newspapers, and the panelists ring in and try to establish a story for the headline. The twist is that the panelists are not trying to guess the actual story (according to the host, points are deducted for this) but trying to construct a plausible story that did not actually happen. Up to three responses are accepted for each headline.

For example, the first headline from the 21 August 2009 transmission, "We Deserve To Know About Prince's Meddling, Say Critics", evoked the response, "Is this Princess Beatrice and Princess Eugenie demand to know who 'Princess Meddling' is?" The actual story was Prince Charles attempting to veto a new National Trust building.

=== Good News, Bad News ===
Each panelist is given a current topic, and must argue whether the topic is good news or bad news. Usually, the panelist must argue the opposite; for example, "Why is it good news that British students' test scores are going down?"

The panelist is given one "MacAulay minute" to make the argument; the actual length of a MacAulay minute is at the discretion of host Fred MacAulay.

=== Focus Group ===
The panelists pretend that they are a focus group, brainstorming solutions to a current topic. For example, the 21 August 2009 transmission discussed how to convince Americans that they should reform their health-care system to be like the NHS.

This round is a free-for-all, and suggestions are generally comedic and occasionally tongue in cheek. For example, from the 21 August 2009 transmission, one of Milton Jones's suggestions was to point out that the Queen must be a fan of American medicine because "she's got ER on everything." This confuses the Latin phrase Elizabeth Regina with The American television series ER.

At the start of Focus Group, a plate of biscuits is given to the panelists, and a point is awarded for eating a biscuit.

=== Who's the New Who? ===
Panelists try to come up with as many examples of who is the new who, in the sense of some trend being the new black. For example, Chris Neill asked on the 28 August 2009 transmission:

Is Big Brother the new pot plant (sic) that my mother gave me last year? Because, like that gift, it's nearly dead and won't be on my telly this time next year.

=== Apathy Attack ===
The audience is canvassed on a certain issue (for example, should Earthlings welcome aliens from other planets?) and an audience member who declares himself or herself undecided is selected. The audience member must listen to the panelists' arguments on the issue (one pair arguing "for" and the other arguing "against"). The audience member must then make up his or her mind; two points are awarded to the team that argued for the audience member's decision.

== Episode list ==
No.	Team One (on the right)	Team Two (on the left)	Original release date
1	Laurence Howarth and Sarah Kendall	Gordon Southern and Milton Jones	21 August 2009
2	Andy Parsons and Chris Neill	Jo Enright and Justin Edwards	28 August 2009
3	Justin Edwards and Susan Calman	Russell Kane and Will Smith	4 September 2009
4	Will Smith and Paul Sinha	Justin Moorhouse and Justin Edwards	11 September 2009
5	Paul Sinha and Andy Zaltzman	Sarah Millican and Stephen Carlin	18 September 2009
