= Benjamin Partridge =

Welsh comedy writer (born June 1986)

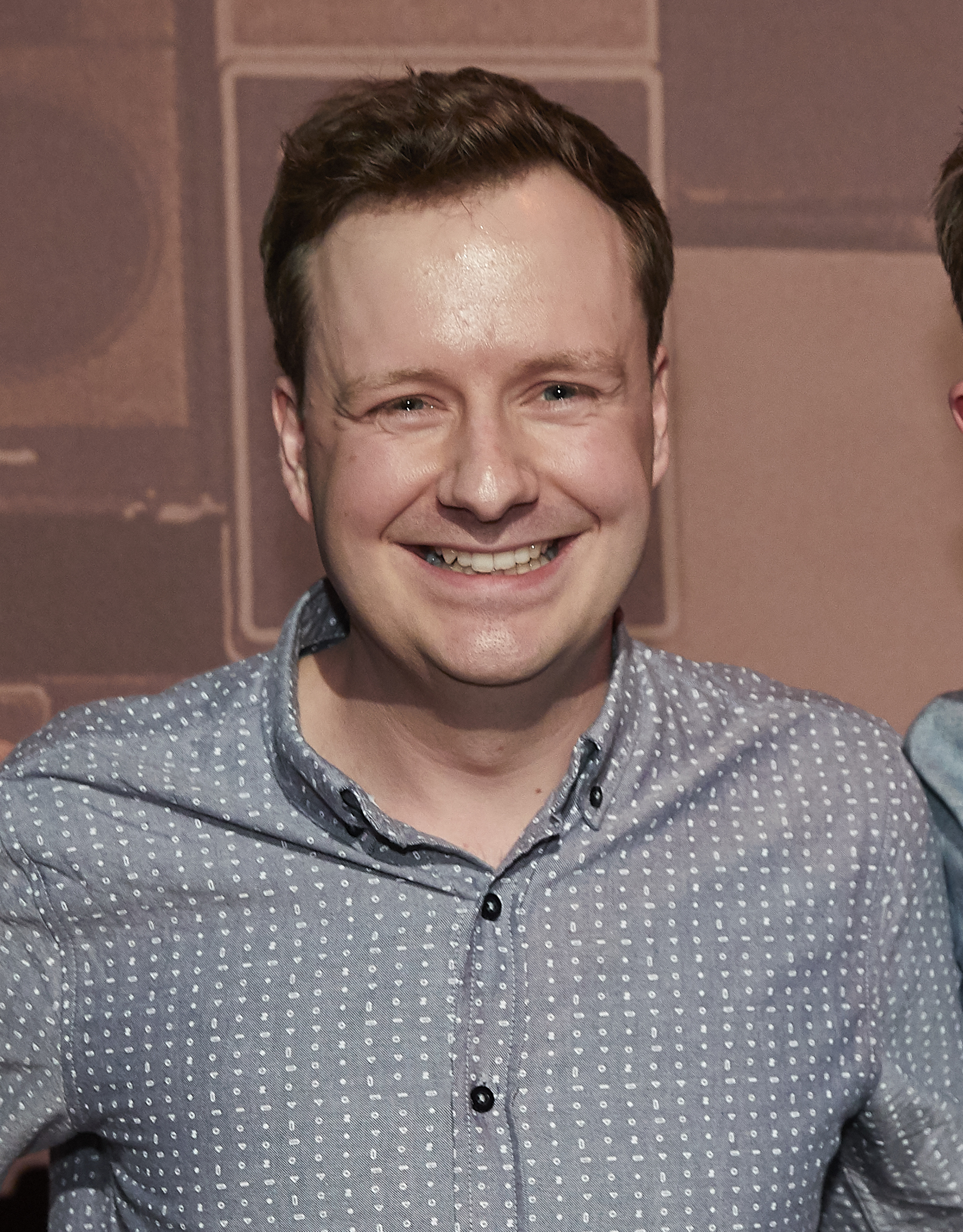
- Partridge in 2018
- Born: June 1986 (age 40)
- Occupations: Comedy writer and performer

Benjamin Partridge (born June 1986) is a Welsh comedy writer, performer, actor and producer. Partridge's professional writing career began when he was awarded a BBC Radio Comedy Writers Bursary in 2011. Since then, he has written consistently for radio, television and live shows. Partridge also fronts two podcasts, the Beef And Dairy Network Podcast which he has written, presented and produced since 2015 and the comedy podcast Three Bean Salad which he launched in 2021 with Mike Wozniak and Henry Paker. Partridge has won a Radio Academy Award for his series Here Be Dragons, a British Podcast Award for the Beef And Dairy Network Podcast, and a Chortle Award for Three Bean Salad.

== Career ==
Partridge's professional writing career began when he was awarded the BBC Radio Comedy Writers Bursary in 2011.

Partridge has written for radio, television and live performance. He writes for the CBBC show Horrible Histories, on BBC Radio Wales he is one of the cast and a co-writer of Elis James's Pantheon of Heroes. Partridge co-writes and produced the second series of Here Be Dragons, which won Bronze at the Radio Academy Awards in 2014. He also devised the BBC Radio 4 panel show It's Your Round. Amongst his further writing credits are The Now Show, The News Quiz, Hypothetical, Small Scenes for BBC Radio 4 and Newsjack for BBC Radio 4 Extra.

In 2013, Partridge performed his one-man show, An Audience With Jeff Goldblum, at the Edinburgh Festival Fringe.

A sitcom that Partridge co-wrote with Gareth Gwynn, Ankle Tag, was broadcast on BBC Radio 4 in 2017, 2018 and 2020.

Since July 2015, Partridge has written, presented and produced the Beef And Dairy Network Podcast, which is part of the Maximum Fun podcast network. The podcast is a comedic fictional industry podcast for the beef and dairy industries, described as "surreal bovine-themed comedy" by BBC Radio 4. Six episodes of the podcast were broadcast on BBC Radio 4 in April–May 2017, with a further 4 broadcast in 2018. The podcast won the Best Comedy award at the British Podcast Awards in 2017 and 2018.

In 2021 he launched the comedy podcast Three Bean Salad with fellow comedians Mike Wozniak and Henry Paker. In March 2024, it won in the Best Podcast category at the Chortle Awards.
