= Look Away Now =

- Genre: Sketch comedy
- Running time: approx. 28 minutes
- Country of origin: United Kingdom
- Language(s): English
- Home station: BBC Radio 4
- Hosted by: Garry Richardson
- Original release: 12 April 2007 – 24 June 2010
- No. of series: 4 (plus 1 special)
- No. of episodes: 19
- Opening theme: "Theme from Sparta F.C." by The Fall
- Website: Official BBC webpage

Look Away Now is a BBC Radio 4 sports-based comedy series presented by Garry Richardson (the Today programme's sports reporter). The programme takes the form of a sports news programme and mocks many aspects of such programmes. The cast also includes Laurence Howarth, Katherine Jakeways, Dave Lamb, Richie Webb and Mark Evans. Most of the show is composed of "interviews" with important sporting figures and satire based on sporting news. There is also a sport related song performed by Richie Webb. Other regular sketches include a panel of ex-professional footballers watching various non sport related programmes on TV monitors and the "Rant-line" which is supposedly open to the public to complain about sport but in fact is mainly filled with messages from people interviewed on the programme.

As of June 2010 there have been four series; one each in 2007, 2008, 2009 and 2010. The first two series consisted of six episodes whilst the third series ran for a shorter period with only three episodes. There was also a 2007 Christmas special.

The third series differed to the previous with the usual panel of ex-professional footballers being replaced with a team of former cricketers commenting on live events such as a barbecue and wedding. Also, every episode featured an "interview" with Kevin Pietersen.

The fourth series started on 10 June 2010; consisting of three episodes with the focus strongly orientated towards the World Cup.

== Episode list ==
=== Series 1 ===
Episode	Original Airdate	On the TV Monitors
1	12 April 2007	Films
2	19 April 2007	Films
3	26 April 2007	Films
4	3 May 2007	Cartoons
5	10 May 2007	Quiz Shows
6	17 May 2007	Sitcoms

Episode	Original Airdate
Christmas special	1 Jan 2008

=== Series 2 ===
Episode	Original Airdate	On the TV Monitors
1	2 April 2008	Detective Shows
2	9 April 2008	Science Fiction Shows
3	16 April 2008	The Bible
4	23 April 2008	Fairy Tales
5	30 April 2008	The Plays of William Shakespeare
6	7 May 2008	Popular Music

=== Series 3 ===
Episode	Original Airdate	Live Event
1	1 July 2009	Wedding
2	8 July 2009	Barbecue
3	15 July 2009	Child's birthday party

=== Series 4 ===
Episode	Original Airdate	On the TV Monitors
1	10 June 2010	Radio 4 Shows on iPlayer
2	17 June 2010	Wars
3	24 June 2010	Panelists' Lives
