= Chris Corcoran =

Welsh comedian and broadcaster

- Born: 10 April 1972 (age 54)
- Other name: Korkey

Comedy career
- Years active: 2002–present
- Medium: Stand-up, radio
- Genre: Observational comedy
- Subject: Everyday life
- Website: www.chriscorcoran.net

Chris 'Korkey' Corcoran (born 10 April 1972) is a British comedian and broadcaster from Wales. Before becoming a comedian, he taught history at Barry Comprehensive School and was the head of history at Hayes Manor School, now Rosedale College.

== Stand-up ==
Along with Elis James, Corcoran regularly performed as 'Mr Chairman' in Chris Corcoran's Committee Meeting, a live comedy show at The Ponty Muni Arts Centre in Pontypridd. In 2013 the two made a BBC Three pilot called The Committee Meeting based on their stand-up show as part of the channel's "Comedy Feeds" season, available to watch on the BBC's iPlayer. The pilot guest-starred Colin Baker.

After supporting Rob Brydon on his tour of Wales 2009, in the spring of 2010 Corcoran took a stand-up show, What Goes on Tour, Stays on Tour, around the country. In August of the same year he took a revised version of the show to the Edinburgh Festival Fringe.

== Radio ==
Korkey is Rhod Gilbert's frequent co-host on his Saturday morning show on BBC Radio Wales. Of the programme he said:

I love it. I can’t believe I get paid for talking rubbish every Saturday with one of the funniest people in the country who also happens to be my mate. My funniest moment so far is when Rhod and I were talking about a mouse in the house and I ended up role-playing a mouse in a restaurant ordering penne arrabiata with Rhod as the waiter. It’s the most I’ve laughed on air, although in fairness you probably had to be there.

He has previously appeared on BBC Radio 4's Jest a Minute, Gilbert's comedy quiz.

Corcoran has also written for the BBC Radio Wales sitcom Those That Can't, in which he performed alongside Greg Davies and Steffan Rhodri.

In August 2013, he started hosting the BBC Radio Wales comedy series Come the Revolution, where in each episode he welcomed a different comedian to chat about life, politics and comedy in front of a live audience. Among the guests on the show were Miles Jupp, Josie Long and Jarred Christmas.

In May 2014, Corcoran started hosting his own show on BBC Radio Wales. It is broadcast on Saturday afternoons.

== Television appearances ==
Corcoran has appeared on BBC One Wales, CBeebies and CBBC. His credits include:

- Doodle Do
- Easy Ryder: Chris Corcoran's Guide to the Ryder Cup (for the 2010 Ryder Cup)
- Nelly Nut - Miss Bunny (voice)
- Wales and the Other Five Nations: The England Game/The Story So Far (for the 2011 Rugby Six Nations)
- Wales on Wheels (2011)
- The Really Welsh Christmas Quiz, alongside fellow comedians Miles Jupp, Elis James and Omar Hamdi
- Floogals - Dad Hooman (voice) (U.K)

== Sports ==
Corcoran has played touch rugby for Wales and has appeared at the World Cups in Japan (2003), South Africa (2007) with the over-30s, and Edinburgh (2011) with the over-35s.
