= Sian Harries =

Welsh writer and actor

- Born: Carmarthen, Wales
- Known for: Man Down (TV series); Tourist Trap (TV series)
- Spouse: Rhod Gilbert (m. 2013)

Sian Harries is a Welsh writer and actress. Her writing includes TV comedies Man Down and Tourist Trap. Harries is married to comedian Rhod Gilbert.

== Career ==
Harries worked on season one of Man Down and was promoted to co-writer during the show's second season. She wrote and starred in Tourist Trap on BBC Wales, O'r Diwedd on S4C and the BBC Radio Wales sketch comedy show, Here Be Dragons.

In 2018, Harries co-produced, wrote, and starred in the film, NeckFace. She was nominated for Best Short Film (with Barry Castagnola and Jacqueline Wright) for NeckFace at the BAFTA Cymru Awards that year.

In June 2020, Harries and her partner Rhod Gilbert launched a podcast titled, The Froth. She was named "one to watch" by the Edinburgh TV festival in 2021. Harries and Gilbert co-own the production company, Llanbobl Vision.

== Personal life ==
Harries was born in Carmarthen, Wales. She married her long-time partner, comic Rhod Gilbert, in 2013. In 2022, following Gilbert's diagnosis with cancer, the couple moved three times to live closer to the hospital where he was undergoing treatment.
