= List of Dave's One Night Stand episodes =

Dave's One Night Stand is a British stand-up comedy programme that began in 2010. The show has stand-up comedians takes the viewers on a tour of somewhere in the United Kingdom or Ireland and then perform a comedy routine in the local theatre, the location is often the place where they live although there are some exceptions. Each comedian is joined by two supporting acts. Each series comprises five episodes. 20 episode have been broadcast across four series.

== Series overview ==
Series	Episodes	Originally released	
Series	Episodes	First released	Last released
1	5	10 October 2010	7 November 2010
2	5	14 April 2011	12 May 2011
3	5	17 November 2011	15 December 2011
4	5	14 November 2012	12 December 2012

== Episodes ==
The viewers and Dave's weekly rank for each episode are from BARB. The viewers listed only show those for the original broadcast of each episode on Dave, not including timeshift channel Dave ja vu.

^{†} indicates the location is not the hometown of the headline act.

=== Series 1 (2011) ===
No. overall	No. in series	Title	Venue	Headline act	Supporting acts	Original release date	Viewers (Dave's weekly ranking)
1	1	(England) Catford	Broadway Theatre	Ben Elton	Jason Byrne; Tom Stade	10 October 2010	Below 295,000 (N/A)
2	2	(England) Haymarket	Haymarket Theatre	Jack Whitehall	David O'Doherty; Andrew Lawrence	17 October 2010	Below 279,000 (N/A)
3	3	(England) St Helens	Theatre Royal	Johnny Vegas	Justin Moorhouse; Seymour Mace	24 October 2010	Below 264,000 (N/A)
4	4	(England) Newcastle upon Tyne	The Journal Tyne Theatre	Sarah Millican	Alun Cochrane; Jarred Christmas	31 October 2010	427,000 (3)
5	5	(England) Westcliff-on-Sea	Palace Theatre	Russell Kane	Carl Donnelly; Holly Walsh	7 November 2010	281,000 (9)

=== Series 2 (2011) ===
No. overall	No. in series	Title	Venue	Headline act	Supporting acts	Original release date	Viewers (Dave's weekly ranking)
6	1	(England) Manchester	Palace Theatre	Chris Addison	Craig Campbell; Jo Enright	14 April 2011	342,000 (3)
7	2	(England) Bristol	Bristol Hippodrome	Mark Watson	Andi Osho; Alex Horne	21 April 2011	278,000 (10)
8	3	(England) Birmingham	Birmingham Hippodrome	Dave Gorman	Isy Suttie; Simon Evans	28 April 2011	273,000 (9)
9	4	(Republic of Ireland) Dublin	Olympia Theatre	Jason Byrne	Rob Rouse; Milton Jones	5 May 2011	Below 232,000 (N/A)
10	5	(England) Shrewsbury	Theatre Severn	Greg Davies	Roisin Conaty; Tom Deacon	12 May 2011	307,000 (5)

=== Series 3 (2011) ===
No. overall	No. in series	Title	Venue	Headline act	Supporting acts	Original release date	Viewers (Dave's weekly ranking)
11	1	(Republic of Ireland) Dublin	Olympia Theatre	Ardal O'Hanlon	Gary Delaney; Josie Long	17 November 2011	Below 289,000 (N/A)
12	2	(England) Richmond upon Thames	Richmond Theatre	Tim Vine	Terry Alderton; Elis James	24 November 2011	273,000 (8)
13	3	(Scotland) Edinburgh^{†}	Edinburgh Festival Theatre	Reginald D. Hunter	Steve Hughes; Henning Wehn	1 December 2011	303,000 (3)
14	4	(England) Haymarket	Haymarket Theatre	Stephen K. Amos	Zoe Lyons; Joe Rowntree	8 December 2011	298,000 (6)
15	5	(Republic of Ireland) Wexford	Wexford Opera House	Tommy Tiernan	Stewart Francis; Lloyd Langford	15 December 2011	Below 272,000 (N/A)

=== Series 4 (2012) ===
No. overall	No. in series	Title	Venue	Headline act	Supporting acts	Original release date	Viewers (Dave's weekly ranking)
16	1	(England) Shepherd's Bush	Shepherd's Bush Empire	Al Murray	Richard Herring; Andy Zaltzman	14 November 2012	314,000 (7)
17	2	(Northern Ireland) Belfast	Belfast Opera House	Patrick Kielty	Jimeoin; Mike Wilmot	21 November 2012	Below 298,000 (N/A)
18	3	(England) Derby	The Assembly Rooms	Angelos Epithemou	Imran Yusuf; Tom Rosenthal	28 November 2012	Below 262,000 (N/A)
19	4	(England) Hackney Central^{†}	Hackney Empire	Andrew Maxwell	Chris Ramsey; Pat Cahill	5 December 2012	296,000 (10)
20	5	(England) Richmond	Richmond Theatre	Milton Jones	Jason Cook; James Acaster	12 December 2012	Below 301,000 (N/A)
