= Frank Skinner's Opinionated =

British television comedy talk show

- Presented by: Frank Skinner
- Opening theme: "No Bulbs" by The Fall
- Country of origin: United Kingdom
- Original language: English
- No. of series: 3
- No. of episodes: 18

Production
- Producer: Avalon Television
- Running time: 30 minutes

Original release
- Network: BBC Two
- Release: 16 April 2010 – 15 December 2011

Frank Skinner's Opinionated is a British television comedy talk show hosted by the comedian Frank Skinner and produced by Avalon Television for the BBC. The show focusses on various topics in the previous week's news, with Skinner joined by two celebrity guests, also interacting with the studio audience. Each half-hour episode is filmed in a different location around the country. It was first shown on BBC Two, with a first series of six episodes broadcast from 16 April 2010, and a second of six more beginning on 25 March 2011. The third and final series began broadcasting on 10 November 2011.

== Format ==
The show is a studio based light hearted talk show focussing on events of the past week, with a large amount of audience participation while also having supporting film clips. Skinner opens the show on his own, and in the opening piece outlines what the general themes of the night's show will be. The two celebrity guests then enter the studio, and they proceed to discuss those topics in more detail, with Skinner guiding the discussion and inviting questions and comments from the audience, some of whom are pre-selected to talk about a specific topic.

== Guests ==
The two celebrity guests each week are all primarily known as or having originated in stand-up comedy, in addition to other regular appearances on comedy or light entertainment television. Some have appeared on more than one episode. The show has featured:

- Miranda Hart, creator and star of the sitcom Miranda
- Al Murray, creator of The Pub Landlord stand-up character
- Dave Gorman, creator of the stage show and TV series Are You Dave Gorman?
- Laura Solon, sketch comedy character actor and guest on the improv show Fast and Loose
- Lee Mack, team captain on the panel game Would I Lie to You? and creator and star of the sitcom Not Going Out
- Sarah Millican, stand-up comedian, regular guest on several comedy television and radio series, Loose Women panellist
- Karen Taylor, creator and star of the sketch show Touch Me, I'm Karen Taylor
- Jason Manford, team captain on the panel game 8 out of 10 Cats
- Patrick Kielty, host of several light entertainment series
- Ross Noble, regular guest on several television comedy shows, notably Have I Got News for You
- Katy Brand, sitcom actress and creator and star of Katy Brand's Big Ass Show
- Joseph Ireland, Classics teacher at Westminster School and keen speed-dater

== Production ==
A pilot for the show was recorded in December 2009 at BBC Television Centre in London. After the first series was completed, two more series were commissioned. Due to the nature of the series, filming of each episode occurs in the days just before broadcast. As such, when promoting the upcoming second series on the BBC's The One Show, Skinner could only refer to film from the previous series.

The studio set consists of just a red sofa and chair, with Skinner sitting in the individual seat, and the two guests on the sofa. The show is filmed in various studios around the UK, with the location also forming part of the discussion topics. Across the three series, Skinner visited Epic Studios in Norwich, Waterfront Hall in Belfast and regularly visited Dock10 at MediaCityUK, Greater Manchester. Other filming locations included Glasgow, London and Maidstone.

== Broadcast ==
Each series contains 6 half hour episodes, broadcast weekly in the 10pm slot on Friday nights on BBC Two. The first series ran from 16 April to 21 May 2010. The second series began on 25 March 2011 and finished on 29 April 2011.

== Transmissions ==
Series	Episodes	Originally released	
Series	Episodes	First released	Last released
1	6	16 April 2010	21 May 2010
2	6	25 March 2011	29 April 2011
3	6	10 November 2011	15 December 2011

== Episodes ==
=== Series 1 (2010) ===
No.	Title	Guests	Location	Original release date
1	"Episode 1"	Miranda Hart and Al Murray	London	16 April 2010
Topics included plastic surgery, Frank's "lightbulb shaped" head, Kenny Rogers, Dolly Parton and Dennis Avner (Cat Man); the forthcoming election, class and Prescott: the Class System and Me; marriage, Elizabeth Taylor's possible ninth marriage and Kerry Katona; speed dating, ophidiophobia (fear of snakes), with the audience including famed speed dater Joseph Ireland, an elocution coach and a woman who set the 2000 Guinness World Record for most cosmetic procedures – 47.
2	"Episode 2"	Dave Gorman and Laura Solon	London	23 April 2010
Topics included binge drinking; infidelity and snooping on partners and neighbours, rear view sunglasses; the postponement of the 23rd James Bond film; the air travel disruption caused by an Icelandic volcano, with the audience including a publican, two volcanologists and an air stewardess.
3	"Episode 3"	Lee Mack and Sarah Millican	London	30 April 2010
Topics included spiritualism, the increase in ghost sightings; dieting, the Obamas favourite chocolates and Beyoncé's maple syrup diet; driving, White Van Man – the rudest drivers, driving tests; and Gordon Brown's bigotgate election gaffe; with the audience including a dieting woman who lost 10 stones 6 pounds in 13 months, a worker at the reputedly haunted Hampton Court Palace and Tower of London, and Professor Richard Wiseman who studies unusual phenomena.
4	"Episode 4"	Sarah Millican and Al Murray	Norwich	7 May 2010
Topics included the renaming of Norwich Union to Aviva, the American grandmother Pearl Carter's incestuous relationship; lying, snooker player John Higgins, common lies; beauty, Cristiano Ronaldo and Didier Drogba on Vanity Fair, strange crushes, the stress of relationships; and laughter and World Laughter Day; with the audience including Miss England Katrina Hodge, an expert on lying Glenn Wilson, a woman who fancies Ian Beale, and a Laughter Yoga instructor.
5	"Episode 5"	Jason Manford and Karen Taylor	Manchester	14 May 2010
Topics included football, the forthcoming World Cup, Wayne Rooney, Manchester City and Manchester United; the new coalition government, Sky News bias, Lembit Öpik's resemblance to a banana; protesting, anti-war demos, the Greek Riot Dog, Leila Deen's attack on Peter Mandelson; sleep disorders and odd positions, sleepwalking and narcoleptic dogs; with the audience including a Plane Stupid activist, a couple who protest nude, and the couple behind the Sleep Talkin' Man blog.
6	"Episode 6"	Patrick Kielty and Sarah Millican	Glasgow	21 May 2010
Topics included celebrity and fame, the final Big Brother series, the knighting of Simon Cowell, Sheena Easton's hostile Glasgow gig, the attack on Leona Lewis, celebrity disguises; a survey suggesting 20% of women would rather give up sex then chocolate; the Labour leadership election; the Lord Triesman bribery allegations; with the audience including X-Factor winner Steve Brookstein, a teenager undergoing a sex change, and Doctor Martin Toby, talking about evolutionary psychology.

=== Series 2 (2011) ===
No.	Title	Guests	Location	Original release date
7	"Episode 1"	Miranda Hart and Lee Mack	London	25 March 2011
Topics included Midsomer Murders; Charlie Sheen; religion, rising atheism & potential bias in the forthcoming census, recognition of The Druid Network; animals, the death of Knut, human's relationship with their dogs, dog-hair jumpers, dog sex-toys and clothing, Miranda's new dog Peggy, Greyfriars Bobby; The Budget and Muammar Gaddafi's Amazonian Guard; with the audience including Andrew Copson of the British Humanist Association, Arthur Uther Pendragon a Druid Chief, Catrima Gabrielle a telepathic animal communicator, and a woman who uses a website to date older rich men.
8	"Episode 2"	Katy Brand and Ross Noble	Salford	1 April 2011
Topics included April Fool's Day, practical jokes and Jeremy Beadle; living in the country; who has not completed their census form; the Big Society, community spirit and real-life superhero crime-fighters such as "The Statesman" in Birmingham and "Man in Black" in London; with the audience including a social scientist, an investment banker who quit the city, a Jewish community assistance group, and the "Knight Warrior" who patrols Salford.
9	"Episode 3"	Victoria Coren and Greg Davies	Glasgow	8 April 2011
10	"Episode 4"	Sarah Millican and Ross Noble	Norwich	15 April 2011
11	"Episode 5"	Chris Addison and Andi Osho	Norwich	22 April 2011
12	"Episode 6"	Katy Brand and Alan Davies	Maidstone	29 April 2011

=== Series 3 (2011) ===
No.	Title	Guests	Location	Original release date
13	"Episode 1"	Katy Brand and Dave Gorman	Salford	10 November 2011
14	"Episode 2"	Alun Cochrane and Sarah Millican	Maidstone	17 November 2011
15	"Episode 3"	Victoria Coren and Greg Davies	Maidstone	24 November 2011
16	"Episode 4"	Chris Addison and Katy Brand	Norwich	1 December 2011
17	"Episode 5"	Russell Howard and Jamelia	Norwich	8 December 2011
18	"Episode 6"	Reginald D. Hunter and Sarah Millican	Glasgow	15 December 2011

== Reception ==
The first episode was watched by 1.877 million viewers, an 8.8% audience share, ahead of the first episode of Facejacker (1.186m) on Channel 4, and an episode of Grey's Anatomy (0.853m) on 5.

== Music ==
The song played during the credits and the interludes is "No Bulbs" by The Fall, Skinner's favourite group.
