= Sarah Millican =

English comedian (born 1975)

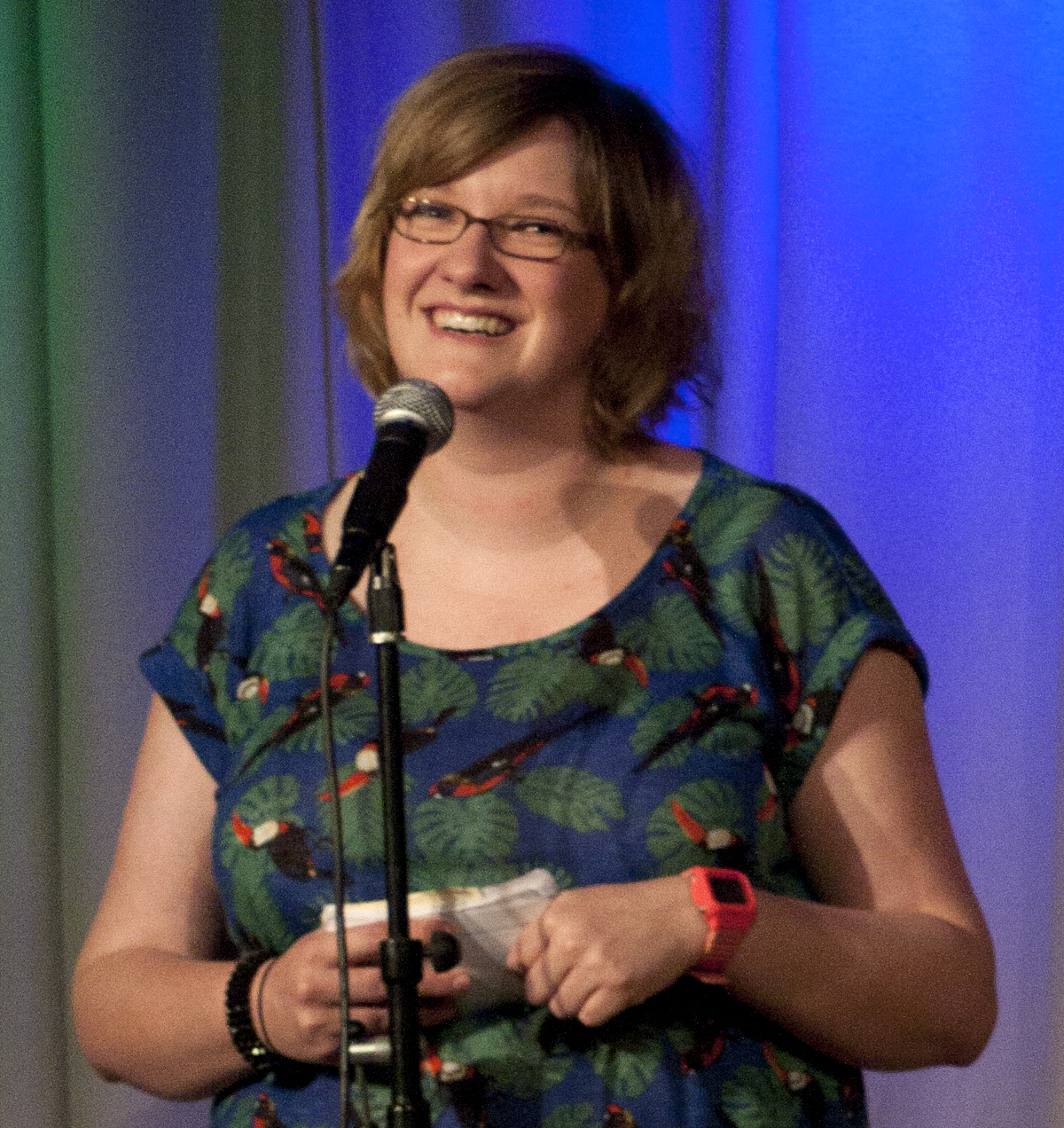
- Millican in 2010
- Born: Sarah Jane King; 29 May 1975 (age 51); South Shields, Tyne and Wear, England
- Spouses: Andrew Millican (m. 1997; div. 2004) Gary Delaney (m. 2013)

Comedy career
- Years active: 2004–present
- Medium: Radio, stand-up, television
- Genre: Observational comedy
- Subjects: Relationships, body image, television
- Website: www.sarahmillican.co.uk

Sarah Jane Millican (née King; born 29 May 1975) is an English comedian. Millican won the comedy award for Best Newcomer at the 2008 Edinburgh Festival Fringe. In February 2013 she was listed as one of the 100 most powerful women in the United Kingdom by Radio 4's Woman's Hour; in the same year, she married fellow comedian Gary Delaney. Her first book, How to Be Champion, was published in 2017. Among her accolades are two Chortle Awards, a British Comedy Award and two BAFTA nominations.

== Early life ==
Millican was born and brought up in South Shields, England, the daughter of Valerie Prince and Philip D. King, who was a mining electrician. She attended Mortimer Comprehensive School, later to become Mortimer Community College.

She worked as a civil servant at a jobcentre until the age of 29. She was married on 5 November 1997 but divorced in 2004 and moved back in with her parents for two and a half years.

== Career ==
Millican's debut Edinburgh Festival Fringe show Sarah Millican's Not Nice, inspired by her divorce, won the if.comedy award for Best Newcomer in 2008. In spring 2009, she began previewing her second Edinburgh show, attracting enthusiastic reviews for her material on the battle of the sexes. Newcastle newspaper The Journal praised Millican's "sharp observations of gender-led behaviour". Her third show, Chatterbox, was hosted by the Stand Comedy Club during Fringe 2010. The show was nominated for the main Edinburgh Comedy Award, losing to Russell Kane.

Millican has appeared as a panellist on 8 Out of 10 Cats, Have I Got News for You, Mock the Week, You Have Been Watching, Would I Lie to You?, QI and Never Mind the Buzzcocks, and as a performer at The Secret Policeman's Ball 2008 and on 4 Stands Up. She has also appeared a few times as a contestant on the Channel 4 crossover game show 8 Out of 10 Cats Does Countdown. She was featured in the Manchester edition of Michael McIntyre's Comedy Roadshow, which was broadcast in June 2009, made an appearance on the third episode of David Mitchell's panel show The Bubble in March 2010, and has been a guest on six episodes of Frank Skinner's Opinionated.

She provided vocal work to the BBC's natural history footage for Walk on the Wild Side, alongside fellow comics Rhod Gilbert, Jon Richardson, Isy Suttie and Gavin Webster. She appeared on Live at the Apollo on 11 December 2009, and headlined Michael McIntyre's Comedy Roadshow, recorded at the Empire Theatre, Sunderland on 15 August 2010. Millican also headlined the fourth episode of Dave's One Night Stand.

Her radio series, Sarah Millican's Support Group, began broadcasting on 18 February 2010 on BBC Radio 4. The format is that studio audience members are encouraged to share problems with her agony aunt character for her to offer tips "in the same way as the busybody at the end of your street who knows everything and dishes out advice whether you want to hear it or not does". Some problems are scripted, the roles being played by guest actors, while others come from real people in the audience, to allow Sarah to improvise. Audience member problems have included "My boyfriend prefers his Blackberry to me". A pair of "therapists", also played by actors, feature in each week's show and provide scripted and improvised responses to all the "problems". A second series debuted on BBC Radio 4 Extra on 2 May 2011.

She was a regular co-host of the satirical news show 7 Day Sunday on BBC Radio 5 Live, along with comedians Chris Addison, Andy Zaltzman and one different guest each week. The first episode aired in January 2010; she and Addison left the show on 27 February 2011.

In December 2011, she voiced three Viz "Comedy Blaps" alongside Steve Coogan, Simon Greenall and Gavin Webster for Channel 4.

Also in 2011, Millican became a panellist on the ITV programme The Marriage Ref and joined the panel on ITV daytime chat show Loose Women, leaving the series in August. She was also a guest on several other panel and chat shows. A live DVD of her Chatterbox tour was released in November 2011 by Channel 4. The Chatterbox DVD went on to break an all-time record in sales for a female stand-up comedian selling 172,000 copies in just over one month.

Millican's television series, The Sarah Millican Television Programme, was first broadcast on 8 March 2012 on BBC Two. In November 2012, she released a follow-up live DVD, Thoroughly Modern Millican. In early January 2013, she appeared for a couple of nights on The One Show. On 15 January 2013, she began presenting a second series of The Sarah Millican Television Programme. Millican was nominated for 2013 and 2014 BAFTA Entertainment Performance awards for her work in The Sarah Millican Television Programme.

Millican appeared in a celebrity episode of Deal or No Deal broadcast on 29 April 2012, where she won £20,000 for charity. She had £100,000 in her box. Also, on the 10th anniversary of the programme, she hosted while regular host Noel Edmonds played for charity. He won £26,000.

In September 2014, Millican founded Standard Issue, an online magazine for women, which was followed up by a spinoff podcast in February 2016.

Millican also participated in BBC's Comic Relief 2015, appearing as a host during the live broadcast on Friday 13 March 2015.

In May 2015, it was announced that Millican would be made the eighth "curator" of The Museum of Curiosity, co-presenting the eighth series of the BBC Radio 4 comedy series.

Millican's autobiography, How to be Champion, was published in October 2017. Dates were later announced for her 2018 UK tour, Control Enthusiast, which was later extended into Oceania and Canada.

In 2019, Millican began presenting the comedy panel show Elephant in the Room for BBC Radio 4. The show focuses on the panellists being asked about various life experiences and testing who is closest and farthest from the national average, and Millican has said that she wishes to defy typical panel show gender ratios on the show by having "three champion women and one smashing male".

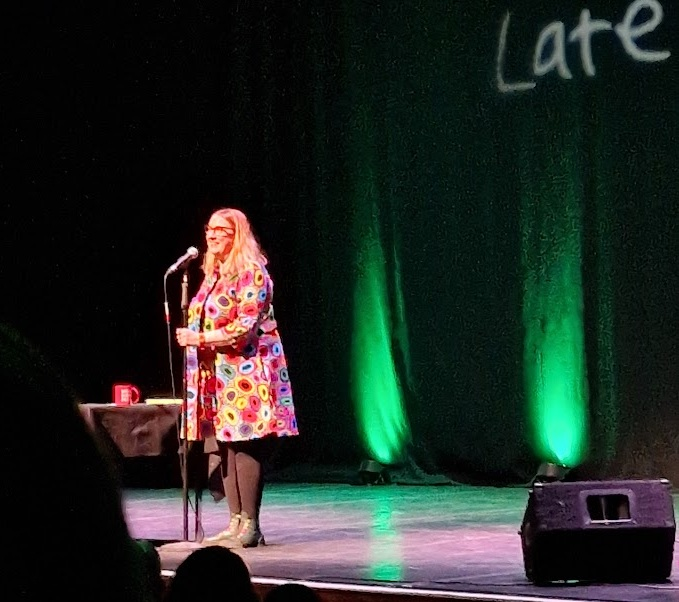
Sarah Millican performing on stage in September 2023 during her Late Bloomer tour

In November 2019, Millican began a YouTube channel, uploading clips from her stand-up shows and The Sarah Millican Television Programme as well as interviews from other shows. As of November 2022 the channel has accumulated over 65 million views and 400,000 subscribers. In lockdown during the COVID-19 pandemic in early 2020, Millican began uploading a series of videos entitled "How to Be Champion Storytime" in which she read a section of her autobiography every day. In 2021 she began touring the UK with her sixth stand-up show, Bobby Dazzler. A live recording of the show was released exclusively via her website in February 2023.

Millican appeared as a contestant in the 14th season of Taskmaster, airing in September 2022. She came second in the show. In November of that year she also announced her new tour, Late Bloomer, which is expected to run for over 100 shows from September 2023 to October 2024.

== Personal life ==
After her husband left her in 2004, Millican found solace in attending writing workshops in local theatres, such as at Newcastle's Live Theatre and the Customs House in South Shields. Jokes about her failed marriage initially formed the majority of Millican's comedy material.

She began a relationship with fellow stand-up comic Gary Delaney in 2006. The couple moved in together and then married in December 2013.

== Stand-up shows ==
Year	Title	Notes
2010–11	Chatterbox	
2011–12	Thoroughly Modern Millican	
2013–14	Home Bird	
2015–16	Outsider	
2018–19	Control Enthusiast	
2021–23	Bobby Dazzler	
2023–25	Late Bloomer	

=== DVD releases ===
Title	Released	Notes
Chatterbox Live	21 November 2011	Live at London's Bloomsbury Theatre
Live - Thoroughly Modern Millican	12 November 2012	Live at London's Hammersmith Apollo
Home Bird Live	17 November 2014	Live at Newcastle's Tyne Theatre and Opera House
Outsider Live	21 November 2016	Live at Brighton's Dome
Control Enthusiast Live	3 December 2018	Live at Birmingham's Symphony Hall
Bobby Dazzler Live	10 February 2023	Live at Dartford's Orchard Theatre
Late Bloomer Live	15 December 2025	Live at Reading's The Hexagon

== Bibliography ==
- Millican, Sarah (2017). How to Be Champion: My Autobiography. London: Trapeze. ISBN 9781409174301. OCLC 1007656174.

== Awards and nominations ==
Year	Award	Category	Nominated work	Result	Ref
2005	So You Think You're Funny?		Herself	Runner-up	
2005	BBC New Comedy Award		Herself	Runner-up	
2005	Funny Women Award		Herself	Runner-up	
2005	Amused Moose Comedy Award		Herself	Won	
2006	Chortle Awards	Best Newcomer	Herself	Nominated	
2007	North West Comedy Awards	Best Breakthrough Act	Herself	Won	
2008	If.Comedy Awards	Best Newcomer	Sarah Millican's Not Nice	Won	
2009	Chortle Awards	Breakthrough Act	Herself	Won	
2009	Barry Award		Sarah Millican's Not Nice	Nominated	
2010	Edinburgh Comedy Awards	Best Comedy Show	Chatterbox	Nominated	
2010	Chortle Awards	Best Headliner	Herself	Won	
2010	British Comedy Awards	Best Female Television Comic	Herself	Nominated	
2010	British Comedy Awards	Best Female Comedy Breakthrough Artist	Herself	Nominated	
2011	British Comedy Awards	Best Female Television Comic	Herself	Nominated	
2011	British Comedy Awards	King/Queen of Comedy	Herself	Won	
2012	British Comedy Awards	Best Female Television Comic	Herself	Nominated	
2012	British Comedy Awards	King/Queen of Comedy	Herself	Nominated	
2013	British Comedy Awards	Best Female Television Comic	Herself	Nominated	
2013	British Comedy Awards	King/Queen of Comedy	Herself	Nominated	
2013	British Academy Television Awards	Entertainment Performance	The Sarah Millican Television Programme	Nominated	
2014	British Academy Television Awards	Entertainment Performance	The Sarah Millican Television Programme	Nominated	

In February 2013 Millican was assessed as one of the 100 most powerful women in the United Kingdom by Woman's Hour on BBC Radio 4.

Preceded by Tom Basden	if.comedy award for Best Newcomer; 2008	Succeeded by Jonny Sweet
