= Control Enthusiast =

Comedy tour by Sarah Millican

- Tour by Sarah Millican
- Location: Europe; Oceania; North America
- Start date: 8 February 2018
- End date: 13 April 2019
- Legs: 4
- No. of shows: 121 in Europe; 15 in Oceania; 5 in North America; 141 in total

Sarah Millican concert chronology
- Outsider (2016); Control Enthusiast (2018–19); Bobby Dazzler (2021–)

Control Enthusiast is a comedy tour by British comedian Sarah Millican. The tour began on 8 February 2018 in Porthcawl, Wales at The Grand Pavilion, and concluded on 13 April 2019 in Calgary, Canada at the Bella Concert Hall. The tour consisted of 141 shows across Europe, Oceania and North America. A live recording of the tour was released on DVD in December 2018.

== Critical reception ==
Steve Bennett of Chortle gave a positive review of the Canterbury show, stating that Millican's "normality is key to her appeal [which allows] her audience see themselves reflected in her". He concluded by saying that Millican "excels" in her writing, "with plenty of acidic punchlines [within the show] to win over a crowd". Elle May Rice of The Liverpool Echo gave the Liverpool show three out of five stars and a mixed review, saying that it was "unashamedly filthy [and] shocking" yet criticised that "the show started shakily". However, Clive Davis of The Times gave the show a negative review, stating that "you [...] have to be a die-hard fan to enjoy her latest show, which rambles around familiar themes" and gave two out of five stars.

== Tour dates ==
List of shows, showing date, city, country and venue
Date	City	Country	Venue
Europe
8 February 2018	Porthcawl	Wales	Grand Pavilion
9 February 2018	Powys	Wales	The Hafren
10 February 2018	Shrewsbury	England	Theatre Severn
11 February 2018	Carmarthen	Wales	Lyric Theatre
14 February 2018	Stafford	England	Stafford Gatehouse
15 February 2018	Hayes	England	Beck Theatre
16 February 2018	Dunstable	England	The Grove Theatre
17 February 2018	Oxford	England	North Wall Arts Centre
18 February 2018	Peterborough	England	Cresset Theatre
21 February 2018	Scunthorpe	England	Baths Hall
22 February 2018	Chester	England	Storyhouse
23 February 2018	Llandudno	Wales	Venue Cymru
28 February 2018	Guildford	England	G Live
2 March 2018	Scunthorpe	England	Baths Hall
8 March 2018	Leeds	England	Leeds Town Hall
9 March 2018	Leeds	England	Leeds Town Hall
10 March 2018	Aberystwyth	Wales	Aberystwyth Arts Centre
11 March 2018	Malvern	England	Malvern Theatres
15 March 2018	Hull	England	Hull City Hall
16 March 2018	Hull	England	Hull City Hall
17 March 2018	Skegness	England	Embassy Theatre
18 March 2018	Norwich	England	Theatre Royal
22 March 2018	Southend	England	Cliffs Pavilion
23 March 2018	Bristol	England	Colston Hall
24 March 2018	Bristol	England	Colston Hall
29 March 2018	Cheltenham	England	Cheltenham Town Hall
30 March 2018	Cheltenham	England	Cheltenham Town Hall
4 April 2018	Reading	England	Reading Hexagon
5 April 2018	Reading	England	Reading Hexagon
6 April 2018	Newcastle	England	Tyne Theatre and Opera House
7 April 2018	Newcastle	England	Tyne Theatre and Opera House
8 April 2018	Newcastle	England	Tyne Theatre and Opera House
1 May 2018	Bridlington	England	The Spa
2 May 2018	Blackpool	England	Winter Gardens Arena
4 May 2018	Dartford	England	Orchard Theatre
5 May 2018	Shanklin	England	Shanklin Theatre
10 May 2018	Cardiff	Wales	St David's Hall
11 May 2018	Port Talbot	Wales	Princess Theatre
16 May 2018	Bournemouth	England	Bournemouth Pavilion
17 May 2018	Bournemouth	England	Bournemouth Pavilion
18 May 2018	London	England	Eventim Apollo
19 May 2018	London	England	Eventim Apollo
20 May 2018	Preston	England	Preston Guild Hall
23 May 2018	Halifax	England	Victoria Theatre
25 May 2018	Manchester	England	O2 Apollo
26 May 2018	Manchester	England	O2 Apollo
30 May 2018	Watford	England	Watford Colosseum
31 May 2018	Swansea	Wales	Swansea Grand Theatre
1 June 2018	Swansea	Wales	Swansea Grand Theatre
2 June 2018	Plymouth	England	Plymouth Pavilions
8 June 2018	Glasgow	Scotland	SEC Armadillo
9 June 2018	Glasgow	Scotland	SEC Armadillo
14 June 2018	Middlesbrough	England	Middlesbrough Town Hall
15 June 2018	Middlesbrough	England	Middlesbrough Town Hall
16 June 2018	Blackburn	England	King George's Hall
22 June 2018	Cambridge	England	Corn Exchange
23 June 2018	Cambridge	England	Corn Exchange
24 June 2018	Margate	England	Margate Winter Gardens
29 June 2018	Ipswich	England	Regent Theatre
30 June 2018	Ipswich	England	Regent Theatre
1 July 2018	Derby	England	Derby Arena
4 July 2018	Stockport	England	Stockport Plaza
5 July 2018	Newcastle	England	Tyne Theatre and Opera House
6 July 2018	Newcastle	England	Tyne Theatre and Opera House
12 July 2018	High Wycombe	England	Swan Theatre
14 July 2018	Nottingham	England	Royal Concert Hall
15 July 2018	St Albans	England	Alban Arena
20 July 2018	Aberdeen	Scotland	His Majesty's Theatre
21 July 2018	Aberdeen	Scotland	His Majesty's Theatre
27 July 2018	Huddersfield	England	Huddersfield Town Hall
28 July 2018	Douglas	Isle of Man	Villa Marina
29 July 2018	Buxton	England	Buxton Opera House
2 August 2018	Carlisle	England	Sands Centre
3 August 2018	Great Yarmouth	England	Britannia Pier
1 September 2018	Saint Helier	Jersey	Fort Regent
7 September 2018	Leicester	England	De Montfort Hall
8 September 2018	Worthing	England	Assembly Hall
9 September 2018	Hastings	England	White Rock Theatre
12 September 2018	Cork	Ireland	Cork Opera House
13 September 2018	Dublin	Ireland	Olympia Theatre
14 September 2018	Dublin	Ireland	Olympia Theatre
20 September 2018	Perth	Scotland	Perth Concert Hall
21 September 2018	Dundee	Scotland	Caird Hall
22 September 2018	Edinburgh	Scotland	Edinburgh Festival Theatre
27 September 2018	Basingstoke	England	Anvil Theatre
28 September 2018	Basingstoke	England	Anvil Theatre
29 September 2018	Liverpool	England	The Auditorium
30 September 2018	Liverpool	England	The Auditorium
3 October 2018	Harrogate	England	Royal Hall
10 October 2018	Salisbury	England	Salisbury City Hall
12 October 2018	Coventry	England	Warwick Arts Centre
13 October 2018	Coventry	England	Warwick Arts Centre
18 October 2018	Belfast	Northern Ireland	Waterfront Hall
19 October 2018	Derry	Northern Ireland	Millennium Forum
25 October 2018	Birmingham	England	Symphony Hall
26 October 2018	Birmingham	England	Symphony Hall
27 October 2018	Grimsby	England	Grimsby Auditorium
31 October 2018	Brighton	England	Brighton Dome
1 November 2018	Brighton	England	Brighton Dome
3 November 2018	Portsmouth	England	Portsmouth Guildhall
4 November 2018	Exeter	England	Corn Exchange
8 November 2018	Sheffield	England	Sheffield City Hall
9 November 2018	York	England	Barbican Centre
10 November 2018	York	England	Barbican Centre
15 November 2018	Northampton	England	Royal & Derngate
16 November 2018	Northampton	England	Royal & Derngate
18 November 2018	Southampton	England	Mayflower Theatre
21 November 2018	Crawley	England	Hawth Theatre
25 November 2018	Tunbridge Wells	England	Assembly Hall Theatre
29 November 2018	Wolverhampton	England	Wolverhampton Civic Hall
30 November 2018	Wolverhampton	England	Wolverhampton Civic Hall
1 December 2018	Bradford	England	St George's Hall
5 December 2018	Warrington	England	Parr Hall
6 December 2018	Warrington	England	Parr Hall
Oceania
26 January 2019	Christchurch	New Zealand	Isaac Theatre Royal
27 January 2019	Christchurch	New Zealand	Isaac Theatre Royal
28 January 2019	Wellington	New Zealand	Wellington Opera House
29 January 2019	Wellington	New Zealand	Wellington Opera House
31 January 2019	Auckland	New Zealand	Auckland Town Hall
1 February 2019	Auckland	New Zealand	Auckland Town Hall
2 February 2019	Auckland	New Zealand	Auckland Town Hall
4 February 2019	Melbourne	Australia	Hamer Hall
5 February 2019	Melbourne	Australia	Hamer Hall
7 February 2019	Sydney	Australia	State Theatre
8 February 2019	Sydney	Australia	State Theatre
10 February 2019	Brisbane	Australia	Brisbane City Hall
12 February 2019	Adelaide	Australia	Thebarton Theatre
14 February 2019	Perth	Australia	Riverside Theatre
15 February 2019	Perth	Australia	Riverside Theatre
Europe
3 March 2019	Antwerp	Belgium	Arenbergschouwburg
4 March 2019	Amsterdam	Netherlands	Delamar Theater
6 March 2019	Stockholm	Sweden	Chinateatern
8 March 2019	Stavanger	Norway	Konserthus
10 March 2019	Oslo	Norway	Folkteatern
12 March 2019	Copenhagen	Denmark	Bremen Teater
13 March 2019	Geneva	Switzerland	Uptown Geneva
15 March 2019	Zürich	Switzerland	Samsung Hall
North America
5 April 2019	Ottawa	Canada	Centrepointe Theatre
6 April 2019	Toronto	Canada	Winter Garden Theatre
10 April 2019	Vancouver	Canada	Vancouver Playhouse
12 April 2019	Calgary	Canada	Bella Concert Hall
13 April 2019	Calgary	Canada	Bella Concert Hall
