= Mike Gunn =

British comedian

- Born: 10 May 1964 (age 62); Barnet, London,

Comedy career
- Years active: 1997 – present
- Medium: Stand-up, television
- Website: mikegunn.co.uk

Mike Gunn (born 10 May 1957) is a British stand-up comedian, presenter, actor, writer, and voiceover artiste. He is most notable for his performance on Michael McIntyre's Comedy Roadshow and for appearing in nine episodes of Al Murray's Time Gentlemen Please.

== Early life ==
Born in Barnet, Gunn is married and has two boys. He attended Collingwood Secondary Modern school and went on to do an OND in Business at Brooklands. However, drink and drug problems forced him to drop out after the first year. Struggling with drug addiction, Gunn took on many varied jobs, including packing pickled gherkins in the Netherlands, manufacturing irrigation pipes in Israel, and repairing photocopiers in London. In the late 1980s he attended Clouds House, a 12-step drug treatment centre for his heroin addiction, and has been drug-free ever since. It was during his rehabilitation that he took up stand-up comedy, performing his first gig at Jacksons Lane Community Centre, North London, in 1995.

== Career ==
=== Stand-up comedy ===
Gunn spent a few years on the comedy circuit performing as himself, but soon took on a different persona as a funeral director. This character act culminated in his first solo Edinburgh show, which was entitled "Good Grief" (2002). Just a year later, Gunn made his second Edinburgh solo appearance with "Uncut", an honest and funny narrative exploring his 10 years as an addict, and following through to his recovery. It was highly acclaimed and received an Arts Council grant, leading to it being performed for years all over the UK, in treatment centres, prisons, and schools, to anyone who had an interest in addiction and recovery from addiction.

In 2012 Gunn teamed up with fellow comedian Sean Collins and embarked on a UK tour with their show "Still on the Roadshow". He has supported Jo Brand and Alan Davies on national tours and is on the road again this year (2014), with Lee Mack on his forthcoming tour "Hit The Road Mack".

He has performed internationally in countries including the Netherlands, Ireland, Germany, Hong Kong, Saudi Arabia, Switzerland, New Zealand, and Australia, where he completed a five-week sell out run at Melbourne's International Comedy Festival. Gunn became the first comedian to play in Kuatan, East Malaysia and has also entertained troops in the Falkland Islands.

Shortlisted for Time Out Dubai – Music & Nightlife Awards: Best Comedy Gig as part of The Laughter Factory along with Justin Moorhouse and Paul Sinha. The show received "Highly Commended" for Best Comedy Gig.

=== TV appearances and filmography ===
Gunn has appeared in various programs, both as an actor, and as himself.

Year	Series	Role
2010	Michael McIntyre's Comedy Roadshow: Bristol (BBC1)	Himself
2002	Time Gentleman Please: This Vale of Beers (SKY)	Mike
2002	Time Gentleman Please: Optics Wide Shut (SKY)	Mike
2002	Time Gentleman Please: Beer Necessities (SKY)	Mike
2002	Time Gentleman Please: Landlord of the Giants (SKY)	Mike
2001	Time Gentleman Please: It's a Wonderful Pint (SKY)	Mike
2001	Time Gentleman Please: All the World's a Stag (SKY)	Mike
2001	Time Gentleman Please: The Return of Martin Greer (SKY)	Mike
2000	Time Gentleman Please: Day of the Trivheads (SKY)	Mike
2000	Time Gentleman Please: King Barsteward (SKY)	Mike
1997	Gas: Episode #1.4 (Channel 4)	Himself
1997	Gas: Episode #1.2 (Channel 4)	Himself
1997	Live at Jongleurs (Channel 5)	Himself

Other appearances include Harry Hill's TV Burp (ITV), Celebrity Deal or no Deal (Channel 4), Soccer AM (SKY1), The Comedy Store, and The World Stands Up (Comedy Central), and Gunn is a regular on the Sky Poker channel (SKY).

== Other ==
Gunn spent four years educating young children about drugs by working on the 2Smart4Drugs roadshow, which was funded by Essex police.

He has been a contributor for The Guardian, and has also written for Time Out, The List, The 11 O'clock Show (Channel 4) and Match of The Day Magazine.
