= Walk on the Wild Side (TV series) =

- Genre: Comedy; Entertainment
- Written by: Various
- Country of origin: United Kingdom
- Original language: English
- No. of series: 2
- No. of episodes: 13

Production
- Executive producer: Caroline Wright
- Producer: Mark Lucey
- Running time: 30 minutes
- Production companies: BBC Worldwide (production); BBC Earth (natural history footage)

Original release
- Network: BBC One
- Release: 15 August 2009 – 6 November 2010

Walk on the Wild Side is a 2009 British comedy sketch show shown on BBC One. It involves the overdubbing of voiceovers to natural history footage, to give the appearance of the animals doing the talking. Celebrity guest voices are also included in each episode, with the exception of the pilot episode.

A second series began airing on BBC One on 18 September 2010.

== Cast and writers ==
Voiceover	Series	Year
Jason Manford	1–2	2009–2010
Steve Edge	1–2	2009–2010
Sarah Millican	1–2	2009–2010
Rhod Gilbert	1	2009
Jon Richardson	1–2	2009–2010
Pal Aron	1–2	2009–2010
Isy Suttie	1–2	2009–2010
Harriet Carmichael	1–2	2009–2010
Gavin Webster	1–2	2009–2010
Jason Byrne	2	2010

Manford, Edge, Richardson, Webster, and Suttie all write the series as well as providing voiceovers. Alex Horne, Alistair Griggs and Ian Manford write the series with them.

== Episodes ==
=== Series One (2009) ===
# Episode	Featured animals	Guest Voiceover(s)	Original airdate
Pilot	Field mouse, marmot, shark, dolphin, crocodile, frilled lizard, gibbon, badger, flamingo, chameleon, vulture, penguin, panda, giant tortoise, polar bear, seal, tiger, giraffe, zebra, meerkat.	None	28 March 2009
1	Elephant seal, meerkat, panda, penguin, gorilla, marmot, shark, fox, black bear, puffin, badger, elephant, proboscis monkey, snowy owl, beetle, ant, crab, ostrich, pangolin	Stephen Fry	15 August 2009
2	Koala, chameleon, marine iguana, anteater, giraffe, bat, ostrich, marmot, gorilla, badger, meerkat, camel, shoebill, shark, caterpillar, sage grouse.	Rolf Harris	22 August 2009
3	Porpoise, white mouse, spoonbill, black heron, iguana, meerkat, walrus, penguin, giant tortoise, badger, rabbit, crab, frog, seal, shoebill, skunk.	Barbara Windsor	29 August 2009
4	Frilled lizard, marine iguana, camel, duck-billed platypus, mudskipper, barn owl, shoebill, puffin, anteater, elephant, chipmunk, chameleon, marten, lemur	Richard E. Grant	5 September 2009
5	Lion, cheetah, shark, penguin, rhinoceros, emperor tamarin, antelope, flamingo, swan, tiger, capybara, owl, giant tortoise, puffin, giraffe, ant, vulture, mandrill.	Tom Jones	12 September 2009
6	Sea eagle, fox, shark, polar bear, lion, leopard, tiger, peacock, starfish, puffin, iguana, wolf, crab, meerkat, shoebill, deer, lizard, sea otter, mandrill, barn owl, penguin, seal, camel, frog, red-capped manakin.	Ozzy Osbourne and Sharon Osbourne	19 September 2009

=== Series Two (2010) ===
# Episode	Synopsis	Guest Voiceover(s)	Original airdate
1	Tensions run high in the natural world as a young lion cub called Malcolm is lost at Giraffestonbury.	John Goodman	18 September 2010
2	A vulture tries out a saucy joke; two Geordie chimps have a close encounter with aliens; An evil cloned giraffe threatens to "kiss your mum".	Jason Byrne	25 September 2010
3	Alistair and Arnold the very British airmen; Sid the monkey's conscience plays a joke on him; Keith the dolphin farts through his blowhole		2 October 2010
4	Two parent petrels fake giving their son a fish; showering beavers conversation is derailed by their mate obsessed with his wife's affair; camel Queen awards a knighthood; a heron repeatedly pretends it's nighttime, then daytime; Monkey Mastermind	John Humphrys	16 October 2010
5	Chester MacArthur's Guide To Wood-whittling; Finbar Finnegan's Fancy Feet; a hyena police chase		23 October 2010
6	A chimp who can't remember if he left the front door unlocked; opera-singing storks; squirrel Henry Edwardson's memoirs of being a jobbing actor	The Three Tenors	30 October 2010
7	Midsafari Murders; Animal Casualty; a bear after his stag night	John Humphrys	6 November 2010

== Music ==
The show often uses music for comic effect, and it has used a range of contemporary music as well as popular music from the past. Artists featured include: Toto, Lady Gaga, Beyoncé, Marvin Gaye, The Pussycat Dolls, Barry White, Shaggy, Lulu, Stevie Wonder, Michael Jackson, Robbie Williams, Tinie Tempah, Bon Jovi, Radiohead and Adam and The Ants.

== See also ==
- La vie privée des animaux, a French TV show created in 1990 by Patrick Bouchitey.
- When Nature Calls with Helen Mirren, a 2021 American adaptation of the series
