= Josh Howie =

British comedian

- Born: Joshua Howie; February 22, 1976 (age 50); London, England
- Occupations: Broadcaster, comedian, columnist, screenwriter

Joshua Howie (born 22 February 1976) is an English political commentator. He is a broadcaster for GB News. Howie is also a stand-up comedian, screenwriter, and actor.

== Early life ==
Although he was born Jewish, Howie grew up in London in the Buddhist household of his mother Lynne Franks and his father Paul Howie. He was a weekly boarder at Mill Hill School.

== Career ==
=== Stand up ===
Howie started performing on the London comedy circuit in 2002. He presented a Edinburgh Festival Fringe show, Chosen, in 2008. It received critical acclaim.

=== Broadcasting ===
Howie was the presenter in 2008 for the Sky Movies show, The Movie Geek.

He appeared in series three of the BBC Radio 4 stand up show 4 Stands Up in April 2009.

He wrote and starred in two series of the BBC Radio 4 sitcom Josh Howie's Losing It, broadcast in 2016 and 2018.

==== GB News ====
Howie was the weekday host on the GB News comedy paper review show, ending in June 2025, which was called Headliners.

He has also been the host of the show Free Speech Nation for GB News since December 2024.

On 22 January 2025, during a GB News comedy show, Howie made a joke that a US church's call for the full inclusion of LGBTQ+ persons included paedophiles. Following this incident, OFCOM received over 1,200 complaints while Good Law Project said they had gathered over 60,000 signatures to a petition against "dangerous disinformation about LGBTQ+ people" and undertook to submit further complaints it had collated. In an X post on 9th August 2025, Howie announced he had been dropped by his acting agent as a result of the incident.

=== Writing ===
Howie began contributing to online men's lifestyle magazine Blokely in 2011, and has written multiple articles for The Guardian. He has written for The Jewish Chronicle.
