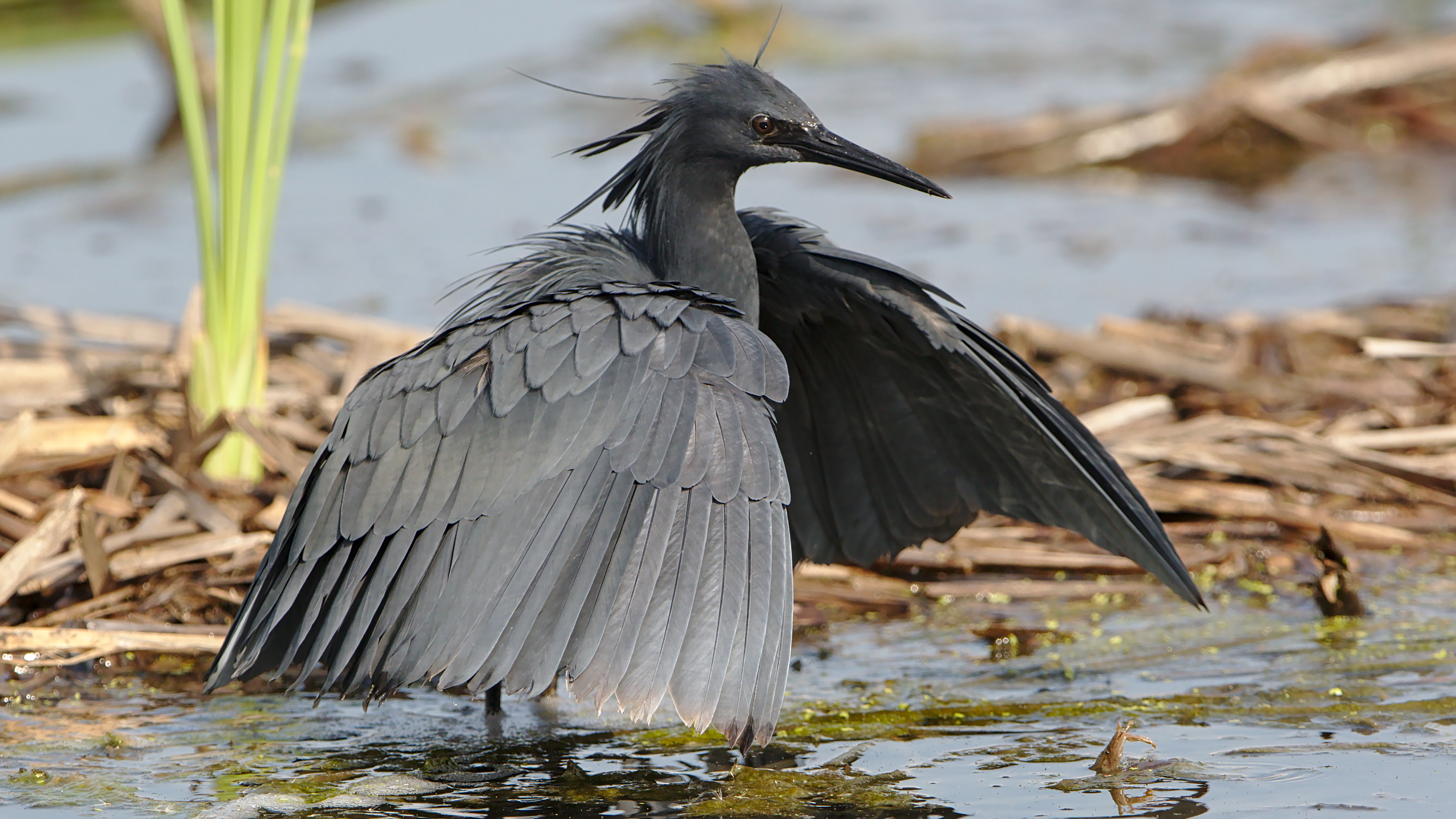
- Black heron canopy feeding

Conservation status
- Least Concern (IUCN 3.1)

Scientific classification
- Kingdom: Animalia
- Phylum: Chordata
- Class: Aves
- Order: Pelecaniformes
- Family: Ardeidae
- Genus: Egretta
- Species: E. ardesiaca

Binomial name
- Egretta ardesiaca (Wagler, 1827)

= Black heron =

Species of bird

The black heron (Egretta ardesiaca), also known as the black egret, is an African heron. It uses its wings to form a canopy when fishing.

== Description ==
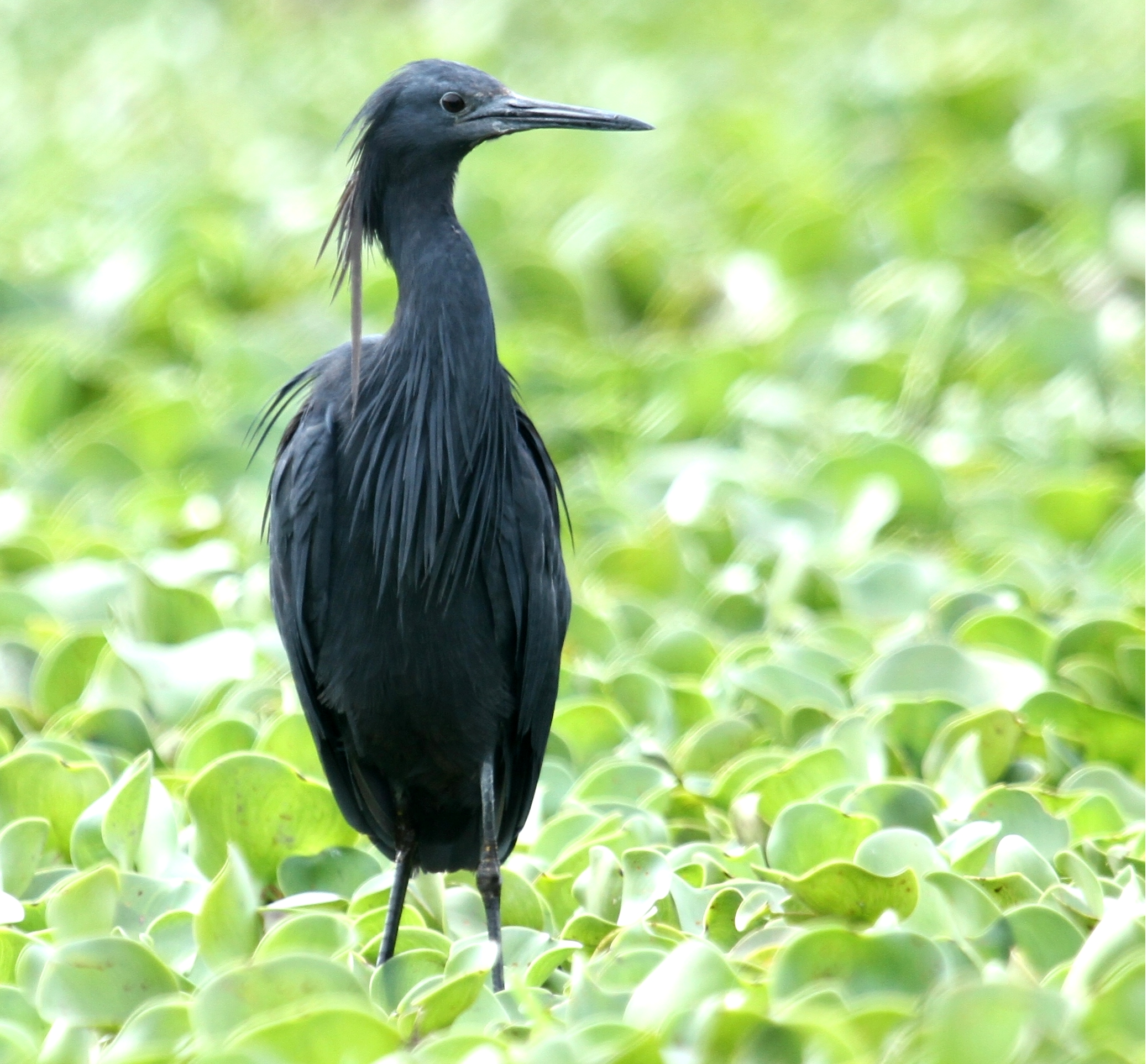
Lake Naivasha - Kenya

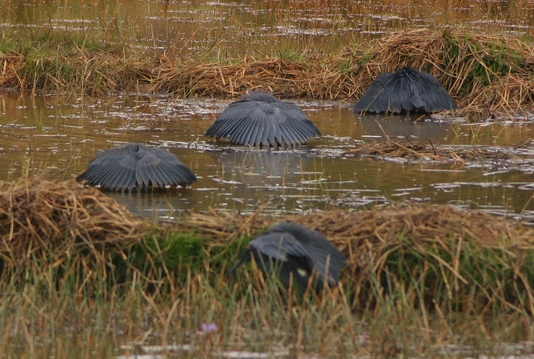
Black herons canopy feeding east of Antananarivo, Madagascar

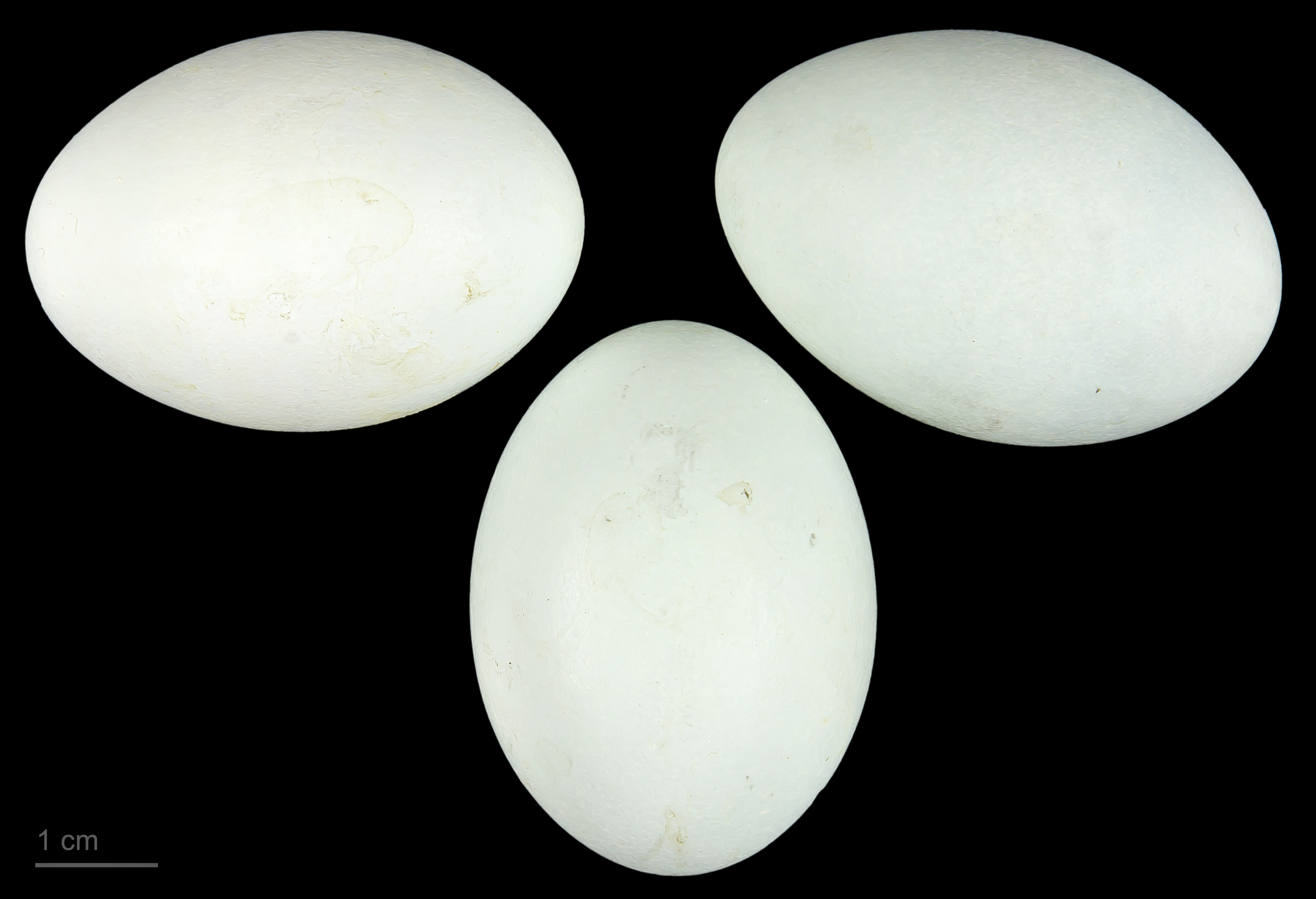
Egretta ardesiaca - MHNT

The black heron is a medium-sized bird, with a typical height range of 42.5 to 66 cm (16.7 to 26.0 in). Their weight can range from 0.27 to 0.39 kg (0.60 to 0.86 lb). They are known for their black plumage, black bill, and yellow feet. In breeding plumage it grows long plumes on the crown and nape.

== Distribution and habitat ==
The black heron occurs patchily through Sub-Saharan Africa, from Senegal and Sudan to South Africa, but is found mainly on the eastern half of the continent and in Madagascar. It has also been observed in Greece and Italy.

It prefers shallow open waters, such as the edges of freshwater lakes and ponds. It may also be found in marshes, river edges, rice fields, and seasonally flooded grasslands. In coastal areas, it may be found feeding along tidal rivers and creeks, in alkaline lakes, and tidal flats.

== Habits ==
The black heron uses a hunting method called canopy feeding — it uses its wings like an umbrella, creating shade that attracts fish. This technique was documented on episode 5 of the BBC's The Life of Birds, and in the "Nighttime Daytime" sketch from BBC's Walk on the Wild Side. Some have been observed feeding solitarily, while others feed in groups of up to 50 individuals, 200 being the highest number reported. The black heron feeds by day but especially prefers the time around sunset. It roosts communally at night, and coastal flocks roost at high tide. The primary food of the black heron is small fish, but it will also eat aquatic insects, crustaceans and amphibians.

The nest of the black heron is constructed of twigs placed over water in trees, bushes, and reed beds, forming a solid structure. The heron nests at the beginning of the rainy season, in single or mixed-species colonies that may number in the hundreds. The eggs are pale blue and the clutch is two to four eggs.
