= Alun Cochrane =

British comedian (born 1975)

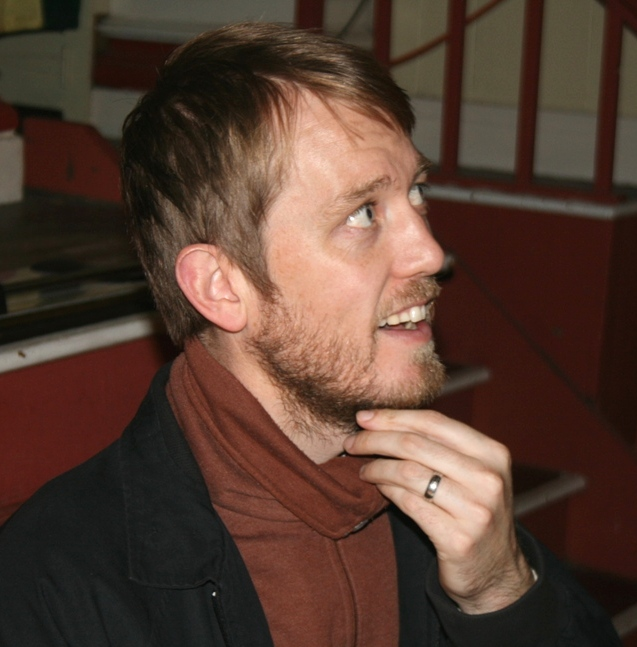
- Cochrane in 2010
- Born: 8 February 1975 (age 51); Glasgow, Scotland
- Education: Royal Welsh College of Music & Drama

Comedy career
- Years active: 2003–present
- Medium: Stand-up, television
- Website: aluncochrane.co.uk

Alun Cochrane (born 8 February 1975) is a British comedian, and actor. He was born in Glasgow and raised in Mirfield, West Yorkshire. He was a co-presenter on The Frank Skinner Show on Absolute Radio (2011–2022).

== Career ==
=== Stand-up comedy ===
In 2004 Cochrane's first Edinburgh Festival Fringe show, "My Favourite Words in My Best Stories", was nominated for the Best Newcomer award at the Perrier Awards.

He went on to be nominated for "Best Compère" and "Best Breakthrough Act" at the 2005 Chortle Awards. He returned to the Edinburgh Fringe during the same year with a new solo show "Comedy with Sad Bits", and in 2006 with "Introducing an Introduction to Alun Cochrane's Imagination".

At the 2008 Edinburgh Festival Fringe he played at the Assembly Rooms with the show "Alun Cochrane. Owner of a Shed. And a Son. Thinks the World Is Wonky".

Cochrane's 2009 Edinburgh Festival Fringe show was called "Alun Cochrane Is a Daydreamer (at Night)". This was the first festival show he performed at The Stand. His 2010 Edinburgh Festival Fringe, "Jokes. Life. And Jokes about Life", centred on a box of his own 'hand-chiseled, lovingly created jokes' from which, he randomly selected and told jokes, integrated into the anecdotal aspect of his show.

In 2011 he performed, at The Stand's main venue, "Moments of Alun", a show about small moments in life, prompted by a recent house purchase during which he realised that with a 25-year mortgage he had to feel funny for a quarter of a century.

=== Television appearances ===
Cochrane appeared on the panel show Never Mind the Buzzcocks in December 2005. In May 2006 he appeared on the satirical news quiz Have I Got News For You, playing on Paul Merton's team.

Cochrane had a non-speaking role as a waiter in the third series of Not Going Out, in an episode entitled Amy, broadcast on 13 February 2009 on BBC One. He was also the warm-up man for the recording of this episode at Teddington Studios in London. Cochrane also appeared as Jason the Asthmatic in an episode of the medical drama Always and Everyone.

He has appeared on various television stand-up shows, including on the Swansea edition of Michael McIntyre's Comedy Roadshow in June 2009, and has been a panellist several times on Channel 4's 8 Out of 10 Cats. He appeared on Mock the Week on 30 July 2009.

Cochrane had a small role as a chauffeur in episode 4 of We Are Klang.

He appeared alongside Sue Perkins on the Sky Arts panel show What the Dickens?.

On 31 October 2010 he was one of the supporting acts on the fourth episode of Dave's One Night Stand.

In December 2015, Cochrane played a barman in the BBC Two comedy-drama A Gert Lush Christmas.

In May 2017, Cochrane made a guest appearance as a patient in the third episode of the BBC mockumentary series Hospital People.

=== Radio appearances ===
Cochrane appeared in series three of the BBC Radio 4 stand-up show 4 Stands Up and has also featured on The Now Show and on Just a Minute. He has also appeared on BBC Radio 5 Live's Fighting Talk. Cochrane started as a full-time presenter on Frank Skinner's Absolute Radio show in June 2011, replacing Gareth Richards. In May 2022, he announced that he was leaving the show because "Frank wanted to refresh the line-up".

In April 2013 he starred in his own four-part series on BBC Radio 4 series titled Alun Cochrane's Fun House where he takes the listeners on a room by room stand-up tour of his house. The four episodes were titled 'The Kitchen', 'The Living Room', 'The Bathroom' and 'The Bedroom'.

In January 2020 he competed on the second episode of series 101 of the BBC Radio 4 series The News Quiz, alongside comedians Mark Steel and Lucy Porter, and Journalist Helen Lewis.

In July 2021 he starred in an episode of BBC Radio 4 stand-up specials titled "Alun Cochrane: Centrist Dad?" He looks at the polarised state of contemporary British politics and what place there is for someone whose views haven't changed but has found himself in a very different place on the political spectrum.

== Personal life ==
Cochrane has a son and daughter and is a supporter of Huddersfield Town F.C. He is an honorary associate of the National Secular Society.
