= Brainless Killers =

- Directed by: Ren Thackham
- Written by: Ren Thackham
- Starring: Steve Hughes; Danny Bolt; Ian Mathers; Kirsty McKenzie; Ben Hamilton; Benjamin Scott
- Edited by: Ren Thackham
- Production company: Action Creative
- Release date: 21 October 2015 (Sydney Indie Film Festival)
- Running time: 17 minutes
- Country: Australia
- Language: English
- Budget: $8,000 AUD

Brainless Killers is an indie short film released in October 2015 and directed by Ren Thackham. On its release at the 2015 Sydney Indie Film Festival it won awards for Best Film, Best Thriller and Best Special Effects in the short film category.

== Cast ==
- Mayor of Zombridge - Steve Hughes
- Aaron - Ben Hamilton
- Andrew - Benjamin Scott
- The Hunter - Danny Bolt
- Zederick - Ian Mathers
- Zedra - Kirsty McKenzie

== Awards and nominations ==
Awards and nominations for Brainless Killers
Festival/Award	Category	Nominee	Outcome
Sydney Indie Film Festival 2015 (Short Films)	Best Film		Won
Sydney Indie Film Festival 2015 (Short Films)	Best Special Effects		Won
Sydney Indie Film Festival 2015 (Short Films)	Best Thriller		Won
Sydney Indie Film Festival 2015 (Short Films)	Best Director	Ren Thackham	Nominated
2016 End of Days Film Festival	Best Supporting Actress	Kirsty McKenzie	Won
2016 End of Days Film Festival	Best Special Effects		Won
2016 End of Days Film Festival	Best Comedy		Nominated
2016 End of Days Film Festival	Best Supporting Actor	Steve Hughes	Nominated
The 2016 Dead Walk Fest	Best Short Film		Won
