= Michael McIntyre's Comedy Roadshow =

British stand-up comedy TV series

- Intertitle
- Genre: Stand-up comedy
- Directed by: Paul Wheeler
- Presented by: Michael McIntyre
- Narrated by: Peter Dickson
- Opening theme: "Burn Baby Burn" by Ash
- Country of origin: United Kingdom
- Original language: English
- No. of series: 2
- No. of episodes: 13

Production
- Executive producers: Andrew Beint; Addison Cresswell; Katie Taylor
- Producer: Anthony Caveney
- Running time: 45 minutes
- Production company: Open Mike Manchester

Original release
- Network: BBC One (2009—2011); BBC HD (2009); BBC One HD (2010—2011)
- Release: 6 June 2009 – 25 December 2011

Related
- Live at the Apollo

Michael McIntyre's Comedy Roadshow is a British stand-up comedy television series hosted by comedian Michael McIntyre from different venues around the United Kingdom and Ireland. The first series was broadcast with six episodes in 2009. Each episode features a routine from McIntyre, followed by three other comedians before the headline act. A second six-episode series in the same format followed in 2010.

A special one-hour Christmas episode transmitted on 25 December 2011.

== Production ==
The series was commissioned in February 2009 following the success of Live at the Apollo. Hosted by stand-up comedian Michael McIntyre, the series aimed to bring acts "new to a BBC One Saturday night audience". The series is often repeated on Comedy Central and is broadcast in high definition on BBC HD and Comedy Central HD.

== Episodes ==
=== Series 1 (2009) ===
Episode	Location	Headliner	Comedians	Airdate
1x01	Edinburgh Playhouse	Rhod Gilbert	Kevin Bridges; Stewart Francis; Mark Watson	6 June 2009
1x02	Manchester Apollo	Jason Manford	John Bishop; Mick Ferry; Sarah Millican	13 June 2009
1x03	Birmingham Hippodrome	Shappi Khorsandi	Steve Hughes; Tom Stade; Paul Tonkinson	20 June 2009
1x04	Swansea Grand Theatre	Sean Lock	Alun Cochrane; Ava Vidal; Steve Williams	27 June 2009
1x05	Belfast Waterfront Hall	Patrick Kielty	Neil Delamere; Kerry Godliman; Jeff Green	4 July 2009
1x06	Brighton Dome	Al Murray (as The Pub Landlord)	Jo Caulfield; Micky Flanagan; Jon Richardson	11 July 2009

=== Series 2 (2010) ===
Episode	Location	Headliner	Comedians	Airdate
2x01	Glasgow Theatre Royal	Kevin Bridges	Craig Campbell; Milton Jones; Daniel Sloss	18 September 2010
2x02	Sunderland Empire	Sarah Millican	Simon Evans; Imran Yusuf; Jimeoin	25 September 2010
2x03	Blackpool Grand Theatre	John Bishop	Terry Alderton; Miles Jupp; Justin Moorhouse	2 October 2010
2x04	Olympia Theatre Dublin	Tommy Tiernan	Keith Farnan; Andrew Lawrence; Zoe Lyons	9 October 2010
2x05	Bristol Hippodrome	Noel Fielding	Hal Cruttenden; Mike Gunn; Seann Walsh	16 October 2010 (Note: Aired in a 30-minute slot on original broadcast.)
2x06	Leeds Grand	Ardal O'Hanlon	Sean Collins; Andi Osho; Jack Whitehall	23 October 2010

=== Christmas special (2011) ===
Michael McIntyre's Comedy Roadshow returned for an hour long Christmas special on 25 December 2011 at 10.30pm.

Episode	Location	Comedians	Musical acts	Airdate
Special	Theatre Royal, Drury Lane	Rob Brydon; James Corden and Miranda Hart (Note: Corden and Hart performed a sketch on stage, in character as Smithy and Miranda respectively.); Jack Dee; Rhod Gilbert; Sean Lock; David Mitchell (Note: Mitchell did not appear on stage; he delivered a monologue about Christmas from the royal box.)	Pixie Lott (Note: Lott performed a duet with McIntyre.); Kylie Minogue	25 December 2011

== Broadcast ==
In Australia, season one and two aired back-to-back on ABC1 each Saturday at 9:20pm (moved to 9:35pm for season two) from 18 September 2010. Episodes also made available from the ABC iview catch-up service.

== Reception ==
The series peaked with 5.5 million viewers for the first episode, which also gained 1.17 million views on BBC iPlayer, the third highest for the year to 13 December 2009 behind Top Gear. In The Times, David Chater said that "If this roadshow is anything to go by, the quality of stand-up in Britain is at an all-time high." The series was nominated in the Best Comedy Entertainment Programme category for the 2009 British Comedy Awards.

In 2011 the programme was nominated in the National Television Awards but lost out to ITV Comedy, Benidorm. It's also nominated for the Entertainment Award in 2012 as well as Michael being nominated as best Entertainment Performance. The programme won the Entertainment Award, but Michael lost out as presenter to Ant and Dec.

== DVD ==
'Michael Mcintyre's Comedy Roadshow' has not been commercially released onto DVD on its own, however both series have been available to watch on demand on services such as Lovefilm and Netflix. Michael's Stand up Segments from Series 1 were collected into a compilation and were included on his 'Hello Wembley DVD' as a special feature. Michael's segments from Series 2 were also placed into a compilation which was included on its own DVD as a content exclusive to the 'Michael Mcintyre Stand Up Collection Boxset' which was released in 2010.
