= 7 Day Sunday =

- Podcast logo for series 1 and 2
- Genre: Talk radio / Radio comedy
- Running time: 60 minutes
- Country of origin: United Kingdom
- Language: English
- Home station: BBC Radio 5 Live
- Hosted by: Chris Addison (Series 1-2); Al Murray (series 2-4)
- Starring: Andy Zaltzman; Sarah Millican (Series 1-2) special guests
- Produced by: Avalon Television
- Original release: 10 January 2010 – 9 August 2015
- No. of series: 4
- No. of episodes: 76 (not including 7 Day Saturday)
- Website: website
- Podcast: podcast

7 Day Sunday (7 Day Saturday in 2013) is a British comedy radio talk show hosted by Al Murray on BBC Radio 5 Live. Broadcast weekly on Sunday mornings, the show takes an irreverent look at the topical news stories of the past seven days.

Originally presented by Chris Addison: he was joined by regular guests Sarah Millican and Andy Zaltzman, and a fourth special guest each episode. It premièred in January 2010 to mixed reviews. It returned for a second series in September 2010. Al Murray served as host for the last five episodes of the second series, joined by regular guests Rebecca Front and Joe Wilkinson. The show returned for a third series in January 2012 with Murray hosting alongside Andy Zaltzman and Rebecca Front as the regular guests. A fourth series followed from September 2012.

== History ==
7 Day Sunday was announced as a new show on 11 December 2009, to be hosted by Addison and broadcast for an hour in the 11 am to 12 noon slot. The guests for the opening episode were to be Zaltzman, Millican, and a special guest. It was to replace another comedy show The Christian O'Connell Solution, hosted by Christian O'Connell with Bob Mills. The new show was to begin on 10 January 2010, as part of the wider re-organisation of 5 Live's schedule which had already begun to be announced in October 2009, the largest since controller Adrian Van Klaveren joined the station in April 2008.

The show is produced for 5 Live by Avalon Television. It was initially commissioned for a 20-week run. This first series duly ran from 10 January 2010 until 6 June 2010. After three months it resumed for a second series on 5 September 2010 until 3 April 2011. The third series began 8 January 2012.

In press interviews during March 2010 while promoting his upcoming stand-up tour, Addison explained that doing a radio show was a childhood ambition, and that as a "current affairs junkie", hosting 7 Day Sunday was ideal, more relaxed than television and good fun, with the weekly deadline being a good motivation.

== Format ==
When the show was announced, it was cast as a topical news series aiming to "pull apart the week's big news stories and see what makes them tick", with Addison describing it as "four relatively ill-informed idiots fail to take the news seriously for an hour".

== Hosts and regulars ==
The following people have hosted the show during its run:

Name	Series	Number of episodes	Notes
Chris Addison	1-2	39	Regular Host, last episode 27 February 2011
Al Murray	1-4	34	Guest Host for series 1 7 March 2010 Regular host from series 2, first episode 6 March 2011
Chris Warburton	1	1	Guest host 12 September 2010

As well as the host there are usually two other regulars plus a guest. For series 1 and 2 regulars were Andy Zaltzman and Sarah Millican. For series 3 Rebecca Front replaced Sarah Millican.

== Broadcasts ==
Last updated January 2018

The show aired on Sundays from 11 am to noon. It once aired at 9 pm on 31 January 2010. The series occasionally missed a week for sporting events (Formula 1 Grand Prix, London Marathon, etc.).

Series One featured 20 episodes which were broadcast between 10 January 2010 and 6 June 2010. There were no episodes broadcast on 7 February 2010, 25 April 2010.

Series Two consisted of 26 episodes, broadcast between 5 September 2010 and 3 April 2011. There were no episode broadcast on 19 September 2010, 3 October 2010, 26 December 2010, 2 January 2011 and 30 January 2011.

Series Three had 15 episodes which were broadcast between 8 January 2012 and 6 May 2012. No episode was broadcast on 25 March 2012.

Series Four also had 15 episodes, began on 9 September 2012, and ended on 16 December.

In 2013, the show returned for a new, slightly different series: it was moved to Saturdays, renamed 7 Day Saturday, had 11 episodes between 8 June and 24 August, kept Al Murray as host, and featured Andy Zaltzman and two guests each programme. There was also a Christmas special, 7 Days of Christmas, broadcast on 24 December 2013.

Series Five only had 5 episodes, broadcast between 11 May and 8 June 2014.

The last edition of 7 Day Sunday was broadcast on 9 August 2015. This edition was hosted by Jenny Eclair, with the final guests included Andy Zaltzman, Holly Walsh and Stephen Grant.

The show was made available on the BBC's iPlayer service and as a podcast, which features additional material.

== Reception ==
After the first show, Jane Thynne of The Independent questioned the lack of variety, covering as it did mainly the heavy snowfall with little political content, which given Addison had made his name in a political satire, she found odd. She ultimately reserved judgement on the show, calling Addison witty but recommending he slow down the pace and stop his "nervous giggling".

Chris Campling of The Times criticised the first episode as being a duplicate of the "dismal, desperate" The Christian O'Connell Solution it replaced, with a turgid format. Persevering, he described the second episode as just as dreary with no chemistry and "none of the News Quiz-esque scoring of laughter points, where clever people fall over each other in their desperation to be funnier than the last."

After the third episode, Elisabeth Mahoney of The Guardian said the show was "really quite funny" but the listener needed to stay focussed on the content as the four way dialogue was quite involved as it covered a comprehensive sweep of topics. For listeners who might want to multi-task on a Sunday morning, she recommended Dave Gorman's show on Absolute Radio.
