= Steve Hughes =

Australian comedian

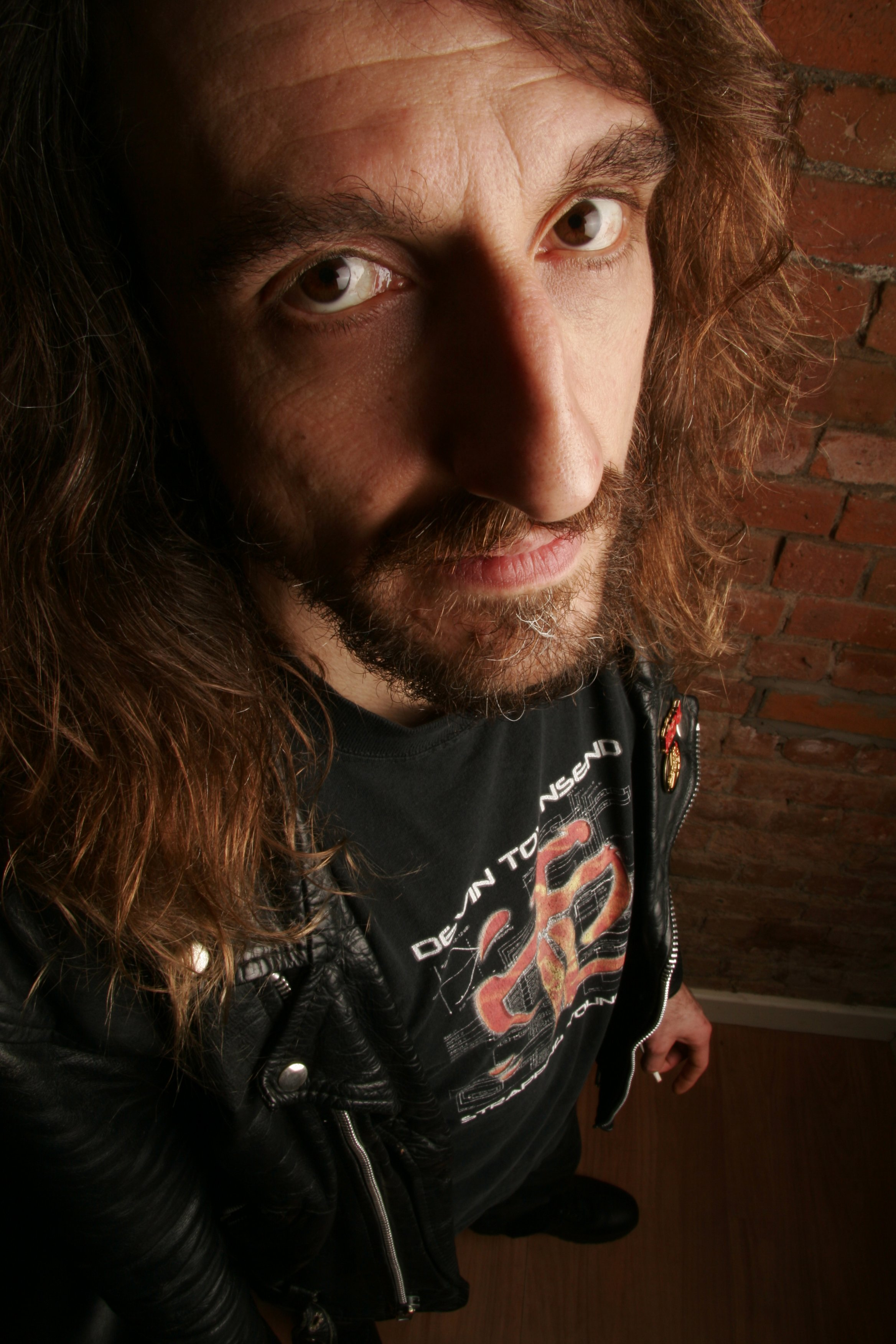
- Hughes in 2011
- Born: Sydney, New South Wales, Australia
- Occupations: Comedian, heavy metal musician, actor

Comedy career
- Years active: 1994–present
- Genres: Observational comedy, black comedy, surreal humour, satire
- Subjects: Politics, social commentary, conspiracy theories, spirituality
- Musical career
- Genres: Thrash metal; death metal; black metal
- Instrument: Drums
- Years active: 1985–1998
- Website: www.stevehughes.net

Steve Hughes is an Australian-born drummer, comedian and actor. Hughes has embraced the title "heavy metal humourist", as it aligns with his approach to comedy, music and life; the press have referred to this title and similar variations.

Hughes was an active member of Australia's early thrash metal scene. He founded and played drums for Slaughter Lord, one of the first thrash metal bands in Australia—a band that had a brief yet notable impact on the country's extreme metal music history. He subsequently played drums for thrash metal band Mortal Sin and the black metal band Nazxul.

Hughes started performing stand-up in the 1990s and relocated to England in 2002 to further pursue his career in comedy. He is based in Manchester, and performs stand-up internationally, primarily across Europe, Australia and New Zealand. Hughes also starred in the 2015 indie short film Brainless Killers, which won the awards for Best Film, Best Thriller and Best Special Effects in the short film category at the Sydney Indie Film Festival.

== Music career ==
Born in Sydney, Hughes became interested in heavy metal in the early 1980s. In an interview with MusicRadar Hughes said he became obsessed with Iron Maiden in 1982 and "the pounding drumming of Mr Clive Burr" and was also heavily influenced by Black Sabbath and Dio drummer Vinnie Appice, particularly his work on Dio's first 2 albums, which he would repeatedly play while attempting to play along.

In 1985 he founded a band that was originally named Onslaught, but the band was forced to change their name due to a UK-based band by the same name. The band briefly changed their name to Devastator, before settling on Slaughter Lord. Slaughter Lord released one demo tape titled Taste of Blood before disbanding in 1987. In spite of the band's short lifespan, Slaughter Lord had received attention overseas and has since been called "legendary" and "pioneering" in terms of Australia's extreme metal history.

In 1989 Hughes joined Mortal Sin While he did not appear on any of the band's albums, he played drums for them during their European/American tour in 1990. After his work with Mortal Sin, Hughes formed a rock band called Presto, releasing 2 CDs. In 1993 he joined the black metal band Nazxul. He also played live with the band Primordial while living in Ireland in 1999.

In 2010 Hughes released the album Sumaire independently under the band name Eternum. Sumaire contained songs that he had written and arranged and mainly performed himself along with "some shredding solos performed by a variety of metal maniacs." While Hughes has focused on his comedy career since the early 2000s, he said in a 2010 interview with Post Modern Ink magazine that music remained his first love.

== Comedy career ==
Hughes first tried comedy in 1994, shortly after having joined the band Nazxul, and started performing at The Comedy Store in Sydney. Hughes quit Nazxul and left Australia for Ireland in 1999, living for a time with members of the band Primordial, then moved on to London, then on to Manchester where he stayed in a house with fellow Aussie comic Jim Jefferies before finally settling in Manchester in 2002.

Hughes's stand-up has been featured at such festivals as the Edinburgh Comedy Festival in Scotland, the Just for Laughs in Montreal, Quebec, Canada, the Melbourne International Comedy Festival and Adelaide Fringe Festival in Australia and the Hull Comedy Festival held in Kingston upon Hull, England. Hughes' stand-up has been featured on television shows such as the BBC series Michael McIntyre's Comedy Roadshow in 2009 and Live at the Apollo in 2011. He also appeared on The Comedy Channel's Cracker Night in 2010 and in 2011 he appeared on the Channel 4 series Stand Up for the Week.

Hughes supported comedian Reginald D. Hunter on his 2010/2011 British tour and appeared on an episode of UKTV's Dave's One Night Stand featuring Hunter that originally aired on 1 December 2011. Hughes also supported Belgian comedian Alex Agnew on his 2011 "Larger than Life" best-of tour. After touring non-stop for four years and averaging more than 150 shows a year, Hughes took a break for health reasons. During this hiatus he quit both drugs and alcohol cold turkey. He returned to the comedy stage in 2014.

=== Appearance and comedic style ===
Hughes' early comedy was influenced by Bill Cosby and the works of Woody Allen, particularly his books Side Effects and Without Feathers as well as a 1965 recording of one of Allen's stand-up shows that Hughes had owned on audio cassette. Hughes has also cited having been influenced by the comedy of Richard Pryor, Dave Allen, George Carlin and Eddie Murphy. Hughes' comedic style has also been influenced by the political and subversive humour of Bill Hicks, as well as the spoken word performances of musicians Henry Rollins and Jello Biafra.

Hughes comedy sets often contain social commentary including criticisms of political correctness, religion, war, drug laws, health and safety policies, colonialism, corporate capitalism, and technology. Hughes' humour also touches upon topics of a spiritual and philosophical nature. He is also known for discussing ideas in the conspiracy theory realm, although he refers to himself as a "conspiracy realist" and adopted this title for one of his comedy tours in 2011. Hughes is known for maintaining his heavy metal look during his stand-up performances. Hughes has worn his hair long for much of his comedy career and also sports a goatee. He often wears all-black, including a leather jacket, concert t-shirt and jeans. Following his return to stand-up comedy in 2016, Hughes sported a short haircut, having previously been known for his long hair.

=== Alleged antisemitism ===
In August 2006, Hughes was accused of antisemitism following a performance of his show Storm at the Edinburgh Festival Fringe. The accusation was made by Jamie Glassman, a writer for the British television programme Da Ali G Show, who alleged that a joke about children playing Nazis and Jews prompted audience members to shout "throw them in the ovens". Hughes rejected the accusation, describing it as "ridiculous". Hughes also denied hearing the reported heckle and said he would have condemned it had he heard it. Glassman described the performance as part of what he considered a growing trend among left-wing people to oppose George W. Bush, Tony Blair, American imperialism and Israel, while also expressing hostility towards Jews. Hughes explained that the joke drew a comparison between children's games based on historical conflicts and the trivialisation of genocide:

I grew up playing Cowboys and Indians, which as an adult I can see is very strange – that you market the genocide of an Indigenous people as a game for kids. Australians are far from perfect – I've never played Cops and Aboriginals, and you wouldn't play Nazis and Jews!

In September 2006, the Jewish Telegraphic Agency reported that Hughes had apologised for a remark about American political adviser Richard Perle, during which he used an antisemitic slur. Hughes acknowledged that his choice of words could cause offence to Jews. Hughes' spokesperson stated that the remark was made "off the cuff".

== Television and film ==
In the 1990s Hughes was a hard rock VJ for MTV Australia By Hughes' own account, he got the job at MTV through the help of a friend who was a cameraman, but the job lasted only about 6 weeks after it was determined that there was not enough of a demand in Australia at the time for heavy metal-based programming.

Hughes was interviewed for the 2014 documentary film Metal Down Under: A History Of Australian Heavy Metal.

In 2009 he appeared as a guest panellist on the Australian game show Good News Week. Hughes also played drums during the episode while host Paul McDermott sang the song "Hanging on the Telephone". He also appeared on the Australian music-themed quiz show Spicks and Specks in 2010.

In 2015 he starred in the Australian short film Brainless Killers as the mayor of Zombridge, a fictional town inhabited by zombies. The role required extensive make-up, provided by the same make-up team that worked on Mad Max: Fury Road. The film was nominated for 6 awards in the short film category and went on to win the awards for Best Film, Best Special Effects and Best Thriller.

== Discography ==
=== Slaughter Lord discography ===
Taste of Blood (Demo)

- Released: 1986

Thrash 'til Death 86—87 (A retrospective of the band's work from 1986 to 1987, including the Taste of Blood demo tracks as well as other previously unreleased studio and rehearsal tracks.)

- Released: 1998 (re-released in 2000)
- Format: CD
- Label: Invictus Productions

=== Presto discography ===
The Remedy (EP)

- Format: CD
- Label: Mushroom Records

Sum of its parts (LP)

- Format: CD
- Label: Mushroom Records

=== Nazxul discography ===
Totem (LP)

- Released: 1995
- Format: CD
- Label: Vampire Records

=== Eternum discography ===
Sumaire (Released independently on-line)

- Released: 2010
- Format: CD
