= 4 Stands Up =

- Genre: Comedy stand-up comedy
- Running time: 30 min.
- Country of origin: United Kingdom
- Language: English
- Home station: BBC Radio 4
- Starring: Various Guests
- Produced by: Tilusha Ghelani, Sam Michell
- Recording studio: Up the Creek (Greenwich), Radio Theatre (Broadcasting House)
- Original release: 12 December 2007 – 27 May 2018
- No. of series: 3
- No. of episodes: 14
- Website: The official BBC website

4 Stands Up is a BBC radio comedy show which first aired December 2007. The programme, which was broadcast on Thursdays at 6:30 pm on BBC Radio 4, contains stand up material from three comedy acts each show, with additional material from the show's host. The host remains consistent throughout the series, and the role has so far been filled by Michael McIntyre, Rhod Gilbert and Chris Addison.

4 Stands Up falls within a family of comedy programmes produced for BBC Radio 4, including 4 At The Store, 4 In A Field and 4 At The Fringe.

A special edition of the show entitled 4 Stands Up at The Biggest Weekend was recorded in 2018 at Leamington Assembly, hosted by Tez Ilyas and featuring Rhys James, Lauren Pattison, Bisha K Ali, and Darren Harriott.

== Episode guide ==
Series	Host	Episode	First broadcast	Guests
1	Michael McIntyre	1	12 Dec 2007	Micky Flanagan, Tom Basden and Mark Watson
1	Michael McIntyre	2	19 Dec 2007	Paul Sinha, Isy Suttie and Richard Herring
1	Michael McIntyre	3	26 Dec 2007	Shappi Khorsandi, Wil Hodgson and Rhod Gilbert
1	Michael McIntyre	4	2 Jan 2008	Josie Long, Colin and Fergus and Ed Byrne
2	Rhod Gilbert	1	30 Oct 2008	Russell Kane, Wilson Dixon and Stephen K. Amos
2	Rhod Gilbert	2	6 Nov 2008	Stewart Francis, Jo Neary and Chris Addison
2	Rhod Gilbert	3	13 Nov 2008	Miles Jupp, Ginger & Black and Justin Moorhouse
2	Rhod Gilbert	4	20 Nov 2008	Danielle Ward, Doc Brown and Robin Ince
3	Chris Addison	1	2 Apr 2009	Stephen Carlin, Adams and Rea and Jon Richardson
3	Chris Addison	2	9 Apr 2009	Sarah Millican, James Sherwood and Jeff Green
3	Chris Addison	3	16 Apr 2009	Josh Howie, Simon Brodkin as Lee Nelson and Alun Cochrane
3	Chris Addison	4	23 Apr 2009	Gareth Richards, Dan Antopolski and Zoe Lyons
3	Chris Addison	5	30 Apr 2009	John Gordillo, Francesca Martinez and Andrew Lawrence
3	Chris Addison	6	7 May 2009	Matt Kirshen, Pippa Evans as Loretta Maine and Tim Vine
