= Chris Addison =

British comedian, writer, actor, and director

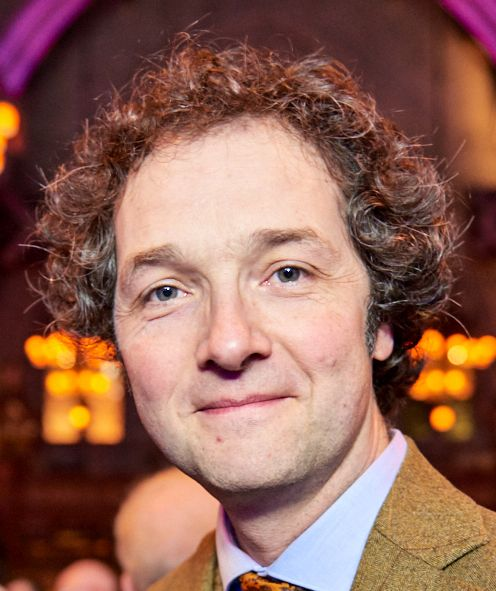
- Addison at the UK Social Enterprise Awards, 2018
- Born: Christopher David Addison; 5 November 1971 (age 55); Cardiff, Wales, UK
- Education: University of Birmingham (BA)
- Notable work: The Thick of It; Lab Rats; Mock the Week; 7 Day Sunday; Skins; Veep
- Children: 2

Comedy career
- Years active: 1995–present
- Genres: Observational, satire

Christopher David Addison (born 5 November 1971) is a British comedian, writer, actor, and director. He is known for his role as Ollie Reeder in the BBC Two political satire series The Thick of It (2005–2012) and Toby Wright in its spin-off film In the Loop (2009). He was a panellist on several editions of TV comedy panel show Mock the Week. He is known for lecture-style stand-up comedy shows, two of which he later adapted for BBC Radio 4.

Addison starred in the Sky Living comedy-drama Trying Again (2014) and appeared in three episodes of series 8 of Doctor Who. He co-created and starred in the BBC Two sitcom Lab Rats (2008). On radio, he hosted the weekly comedy news satire show 7 Day Sunday on BBC Radio 5 Live from 2009 to 2010. In 2020 he co-created the FX parental-comedy series Breeders, starring Martin Freeman.

== Early life and education ==
Christopher David Addison was born on 5 November 1971 in Cardiff, Wales, to English parents. The family moved to Worsley, Salford, England, when he was four. On the BBC Radio 4 programme Chain Reaction, he stated he considers himself a middle-class Mancunian.

He was educated at Manchester Grammar School, an independent school for boys in Manchester. At MGS rather than playing cricket he played the game podex. He then attended the University of Birmingham, where he studied English literature with the original intent of becoming a theatre director. After his directing plans did not work out, he drifted into comedy as an alternative creative outlet.

== Career ==
=== Stand-up ===
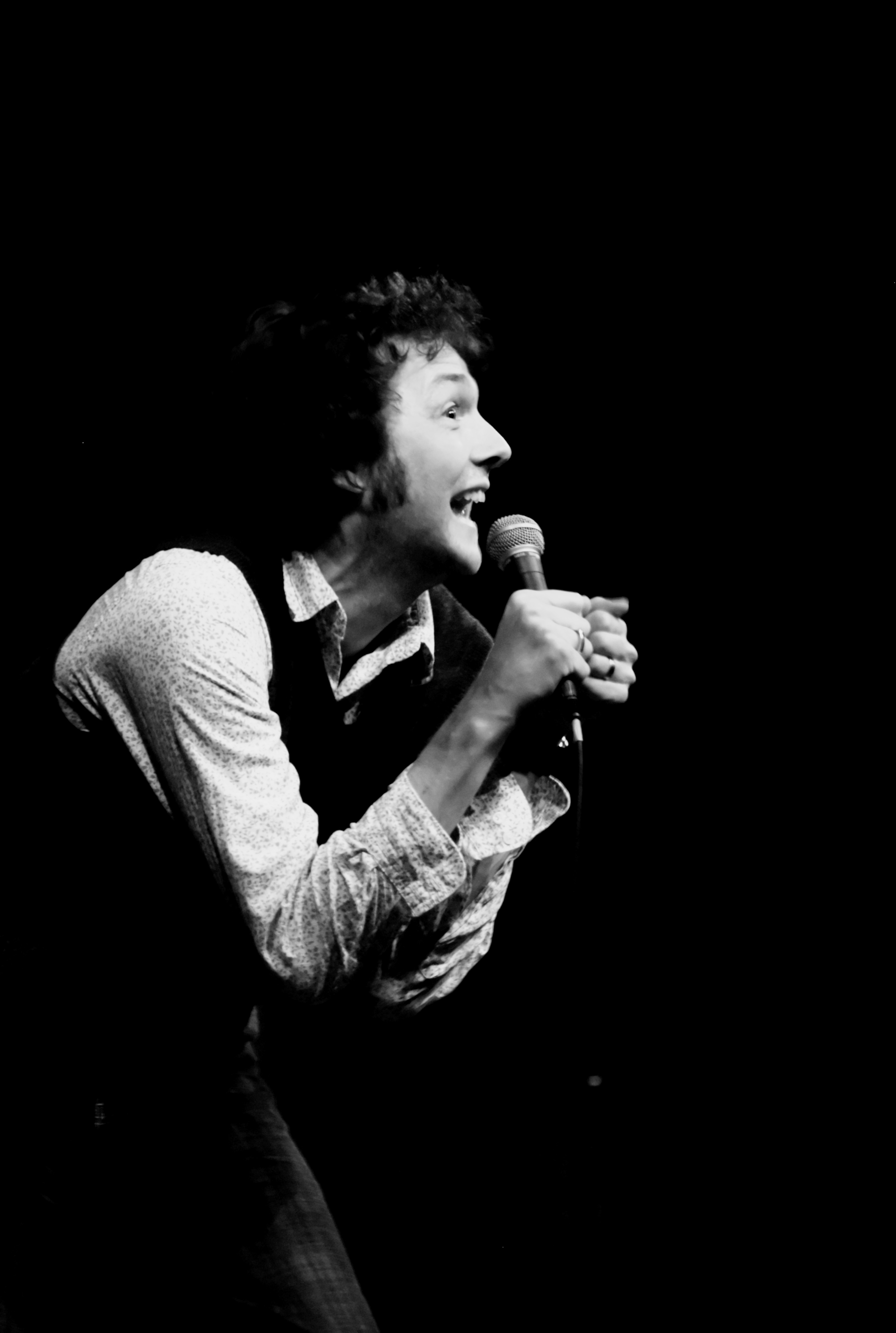
Addison performing at Resofit, a benefit concert for Resonance FM, 2007

Addison's first solo show at the Edinburgh Festival Fringe was in 1998, for which he was nominated for Best Newcomer at the Perrier Awards. He continued to bring shows to the Fringe for several years, gaining two Perrier Award nominations – for his 2004 show Civilisation and 2005's Atomicity. In 2005 he won the City Life Comedian of the Year Award, a stand-up competition in the North West of England.

==== Edinburgh Festival Fringe ====
- 1998 Chris Addison
- 1999 Gentleman Scholar Acrobat
- 2000 Cakes and Ale
- 2001 Port Out, Starboard Home
- 2002 The Ape That Got Lucky (later adapted for BBC Radio 4)
- 2004 Civilization (nominated for Perrier Comedy Award, later adapted for BBC Radio 4)
- 2005 Atomicity (nominated for Perrier Comedy Award)

=== Radio ===
First broadcast in 2004, Addison co-wrote and co-starred in the political satire The Department, along with John Oliver and Andy Zaltzman. It ran for 14 episodes over three series on BBC Radio 4, ending in 2006.

In August 2005, Radio 4 aired The Ape That Got Lucky, Addison's adaptation of his 2002 Edinburgh Festival Fringe show of the same name. This programme featured fellow comedians Geoffrey McGivern, Jo Enright and Dan Tetsell. On 8 May 2006, The Ape That Got Lucky won the gold award in the comedy production category at the Sony Radio Academy Awards.

In 2006, Addison recorded Chris Addison's Civilization, again for Radio 4, based on his Edinburgh Fringe show of 2004; this again featured McGivern, Enright and Tetsell and was aired in four parts over the summer.

He has been a panellist on three of Radio 4's comedy panel games: Armando Iannucci's Charm Offensive, first appearing in 2006, Just a Minute, first appearing in 2007, and The Unbelievable Truth, first appearing in 2009.

Addison hosted a series of the Radio 4 comedy series 4 Stands Up, which showcases up-coming and established comedy talent. As host, Addison performs a short opening set and introduces the acts, in the style of a compère at a comedy club. The first episode was broadcast on 2 April 2009.

On 10 May 2009, Addison hosted the Sunday Night Show on Absolute Radio in place of fellow stand-up comedian Iain Lee who was away due to being on his honeymoon.

Addison hosted 7 Day Sunday, a satirical news show on BBC Radio 5 Live along with his co-hosts Sarah Millican and Andy Zaltzman. The first episode aired in January 2010. Addison presented the second series of the show until February 2011, when he was replaced by Al Murray.

He is also good friends with Geoff Lloyd on Absolute Radio and has made a few appearances on Geoff Lloyd's Hometime Show.

=== Television ===
==== The Thick of It ====
From 2005 to 2012, Addison appeared in the BBC television satirical comedy series The Thick of It as Oliver "Ollie" Reeder, Junior Advisor (later Special Advisor) to the Secretary of State (Department of Social Affairs and Citizenship). He appeared in all of the four series, as well as the two specials 'Rise of the Nutters' and 'Spinners and Losers'.

Addison also featured in the film spin-off of The Thick of It, titled In the Loop, playing Toby Wright, a character very similar to his part in the television original.

==== Lab Rats ====
In July 2008, BBC Two aired Lab Rats, a sitcom starring Addison and co-written with Carl Cooper. Lab Rats featured cast members Jo Enright, Geoffrey McGivern and Dan Tetsell, with whom Addison had worked previously on the radio adaptations of his one-man shows The Ape That Got Lucky and Civilisation.

Lab Rats was a return to the traditional, joke-heavy, studio based sitcom format that has fallen out of fashion in recent times in favour of the single-camera sitcom. The series was not generally well received by critics and was not renewed for a second series.

==== Mock the Week ====
After several guest appearances on the comedy panel show Mock the Week, in September 2011 Addison became a regular panellist, appearing in every episode from the second part of series 10 until series 12 (2013). He appeared alongside other regular panellists Hugh Dennis and Andy Parsons and the show's host, Dara Ó Briain.

==== Other TV acting projects ====
In 2014 Addison starred in the Sky Living series Trying Again.

==== Guest appearances and hosting ====
In 2000 Addison co-hosted the short-lived Channel 4 comedy series Dotcomedy with Gail Porter. This was a late-night, risque show featuring video clips and other humour derived from the Internet.

He has appeared on Have I Got News for You six times, Would I Lie to You? once and 8 Out of 10 Cats twice. Addison also appeared in episode 3 of series 5 of Live at the Apollo. He has thrice appeared on QI.

From 2008 to 2009, Addison was a team captain on What the Dickens?, hosted by Sandi Toksvig on Sky Arts.

Addison appeared on The Graham Norton Show on 16 April 2009 promoting In the Loop. On 18 April 2010 he appeared on The Andrew Marr Show to comment on the week's political issues, including the volcanic ash cloud from Iceland and The First Election Debate.

He appeared on Skins as Professor David Blood, the college director of Roundview College and father of third Generation character Grace Violet. On 4 November 2010 Addison hosted the BBC's Have I Got News For You, having previously been a guest on the show.

In the summer of 2011 Addison hosted an E4 comedy chat show called Show and Tell, with each of the 8 episodes featuring three guest stand-up comedians.

Addison has also made an appearance in children's television show Horrible Histories.

In August 2014, it was announced that Addison would make a guest appearance in the two-part series finale of the eighth series of Doctor Who with his former The Thick of It co-star Peter Capaldi, who plays the Twelfth Doctor. His character, Seb, first appeared in the mid-series episode "The Caretaker" and then appeared in further episodes including "Dark Water" and "Death in Heaven".

==== Directing and producing ====
In 2013, he began working as a director on Armando Iannucci's HBO sitcom Veep. He directed 13 episodes. In 2016, he won the Directors Guild of America Award for Outstanding Directing – Comedy Series and received a nomination for the Primetime Emmy Award for Outstanding Directing for a Comedy Series. Alongside directing, he also served as executive producer in 2015. For this work on Series 3, he and the other producers on the show received a nomination for the Primetime Emmy Award for Outstanding Comedy Series. They won the award for Series 4 and 5.

In 2020, sitcom Breeders premiered on both US TV channel FX and Britain's Sky One. Breeders was co-created by Addison, main co-star Martin Freeman and comedy writer Simon Blackwell and is based on Freeman's own experience as a parent. It went on for 4 successful series with Sky and Addison directed 15 episodes.

=== Film ===
Addison directed the 2019 comedy The Hustle, starring Rebel Wilson and Anne Hathaway, a remake of Dirty Rotten Scoundrels (1988), which in turn was a remake of Bedtime Story (1964).

In 2019, Addison was slated to direct Ralph Fiennes playing George Frederick Handel in a period comedy-drama, Hallelujah.

=== Other work ===
From 2003 to 2005 Addison wrote a fortnightly finance column for The Guardian titled "Funny Money". On alternate weeks, when the column was not written by Addison, writing duties passed to fellow stand-up Dominic Holland.

Addison has written two books, both published by Hodder and Stoughton: Cautionary Tales for Grown Ups in 2006 and It Wasn't Me: Why Everybody is to Blame and You're Not in 2008.

In 2011 and 2012 he appeared in a range of Direct Line adverts as a Direct Line representative alongside difficult customers, played by fellow comedic performers Alexander Armstrong, Amelia Bullmore and Lorna Watson. On 9 April 2011 he was part of the Comedy Takeover on TV channel Dave, where he presented and selected the shows.

In 2011 he took part in three shows of the 16-date Uncaged Monkeys tour along with Brian Cox, Robin Ince, Ben Goldacre, Simon Singh and Dara Ó Briain.

In July 2013 he received an honorary degree from the University of Birmingham.

In February 2016 Addison took the speaking role of Smith, an Englishman, in the French opera L'Étoile at The Royal Opera House, London.

Addison became a Patron of Social Enterprise UK in 2017.

== Personal life ==
Addison currently lives in Bromley, South East London, with his wife and two children: a boy and a girl.

As of March 2020, he was a member of the Labour Party.
