= Gavin Webster =

British stand-up comedian

- Born: 13 November 1969 (age 56); Blaydon-on-Tyne, County Durham, England
- Website: www.gavinwebster.co.uk

Gavin Webster (born 13 November 1969 in Blaydon-on-Tyne) is a British stand-up comedian. He made his debut in February 1993 at the Barley Mow pub in Gateshead, on the same bill as Ross Noble although he had been a straight man in a double act called Scarboro and Thick a few months prior to this.

His television work includes Never Mind The Buzzcocks, The Stand-up Show, Does Doug Know, Take The Mike, The Regionnaires, The Eleven O Clock show, The Comedy Store, Comedy Blue and The World Stand Up Tour (Channel 9 Australia, Comedy Central USA). He was one of the writers and was a voiceover performer in the hit BBC1 Children's programme Walk on the Wild Side in 2009, 2010 and again in 2013. In 2011 he voiced Sid the Sexist for Channel 4's series Blaps adapting Viz.

His many radio jobs have included stints on BBC Radio 4 on the sitcom Hal as Barry with Hal Cruttenden, The Show What You Wrote with John Thompson, and The News Quiz.

His 2011 Edinburgh Fringe show, All Young People are Cunts was positively reviewed by the British Comedy Guide. He previously played Edinburgh in 2003, 2008 and 2009.

In 2012 he returned to the Edinburgh Fringe with a new stand-up show, Bill Hicks Wasn't Very Good. His 2014 Edinburgh show was called "A Controversial Title in Order to Sell Tickets" whilst his 2016 show was entitled "Jesus Christ Is A Window Cleaner Now". In all he has performed solo shows at the fringe 15 times including an unbroken run from 2011-2019.

In 2014 he won the award for Best UK Live Stand Up, commonly known as 'The Comedian's Comedian', the second only winner of the award after Mick Ferry won it in 2013.

He appears in a minor role in the 2016 Ken Loach film I, Daniel Blake as Joe.

He also appears with a short speaking part in Loach's follow up film set in Newcastle Sorry We Missed You as a Janitor and thus became part of a very small group of actors to have appeared in more than one of Ken Loach's films.

In 2018 he financed and made his own sitcom 'I've Got A Job For You Gav' where he plays the part of a middle aged taxi driver (Gav) who shares a flat with his landlord and drives the great and the good around Newcastle upon Tyne where they get secret hedonistic pleasures in seedy parts of town. All 3 episodes of series 1 are now on Amazon Prime Video.
