= World Laughter Day =

Unofficial observance; May 10

World Laughter Day was established in 1998 and the first celebration was on 10 May 1998, in Mumbai, India, arranged by Dr. Madan Kataria, founder of the worldwide Laughter Yoga movement.

The day is now celebrated on the first Sunday of May worldwide.

== History ==
World Laughter Day was created in 1998 by Dr. Madan Kataria, founder of the worldwide Laughter Yoga movement. Dr. Kataria, a family doctor in India, was inspired to start the Laughter Yoga movement in part by the facial feedback hypothesis, which postulates that a person's facial expressions can have an effect on their emotions. The celebration of World Laughter Day is a positive manifestation for world peace and is intended to build up a global consciousness of brotherhood and friendship through laughter. It is most often celebrated by gatherings of people in public places with the sole purpose of laughing. Its popularity has grown exponentially with that of the Laughter Yoga movement now counting thousands of Laughter Clubs in more than 115 countries. And now it is celebrated worldwide.
