= Podex =

Variety of cricket

Puddocks (also known as Podex and Puddex) is a variety of cricket, invented by Boston Grammar School, and is played in some public schools in the UK and on youth camps, most famously Crusader Camp and Houseparty at Bethany School, which has recently been classed as a Centre of Excellence of Podex. Unlike cricket it uses two instead of three stumps, and a bat rather like a rounders bat but more the length of cricket bat. A soft rather than a hard ball – a sorbo – is used. Kneale (2016) notes a variety in the rules of the game and suggests its origins lie in games played at camps organised by the Scripture Union prior to the First War.

The Henry Howard, 18th Earl of Suffolk's (1897) Encyclopedia of Sport includes this entry: In the summer a modification of cricket called puddex is played at odd times. A hard tennis ball and a thick round stick are used....The pitch must be fourteen yards long, the wicket at least a foot wide. No hit behind the wicket counts. And Howard credits a Mr Andrew Lang, easily confused with Anthony Buckley (author) with inventing the name.

== Listings of rules ==
The rules, whilst highly debated, are as follows.

The players are split into two teams of equal number, with a maximum of 52 players allowed, which would result in a 26 a side game. There are two batters at all times, apart from when only one batter remains, which is when the Last Podexist Standing rule commences(see later). All players fields unless they are batting, regardless of what team they are on. Intentional misfields or dropped catches can result in the docking of runs. The podex wicket is made up of a 14 yard pitch marked at each end by two stumps and an outfield. There are no boundaries in podex.

Bowling

The bowlers will bowl the ball underarm at two stumps. There are two bowlers from each end of the podex wicket. Either bowler can bowl at any time. It is considered podex etiquette to hand over your bowling responsibilities after bowling around 20 balls, or after being bowler for 10 minutes.

The Grub

What makes the game of podex so distinctive is the loud calls of ‘Grub!’ heard all around the podex field. A grub occurs if the ball bounces before it reaches the batsman. One cannot be out bowled but they can be out caught or run out if they hit the ball. It is considered podex etiquette to bellow ‘Grub!’ whenever a grub occurs. John Lotz is understood to be the individual who coined the word 'grub' as it was previously known as a 'bounce ball'. After a meeting with the IPA (International Podex Association) in 1974 it was agreed that 'grub' was a more fitting term for a bouncing ball.

Batting

One scores a run by running from one end to the other. When one has reached 20 runs one has to run two runs every time they hit it. When one has 30 runs they have to run three runs every time they hit the sobor, and so on and so forth. The highest individual Podex score is accredited to Charles Cotton, who is the only batter to break into four figures, scoring 1,325 in 1986, but was run out attempting his 124th consecutive run after hitting a ball onto a nearby roof.

One can get out in three ways. Bowled out, caught out or run out. One is bowled out if they are batting and the ball hits the stumps, and it bounces after the batsman. One is caught out if they hit the ball and a fielder catches it. One can be run out in a number of ways. On the first run whoever hit the ball is out, regardless of which end they are stumped at. If the batting pair choose to take a second run, the batter out is the one closest to the stump.

Last Podexist Standing

When all but one member of the batting team is out, the Last Podexist Standing rule commences. It involves normal podex rules, asides from that the batter can only be stumped out at the end they are running to.

Key Contributors to the World of Podex

The train of thought of any well-read podexist, when thinking of the game of podex, will inevitable arrive at John Lotz. Lotz is a controversial figure in the world of podex, who is known to regularly clash with the aforementioned Anthony Buckley (author), on the specifics of the game of podex. Whilst Lotz is famed and well regarded as a result of his founding of the term 'grub', many members of the world of podex hold grudges against him due to his belief that one can be out in a fourth way, stumped. This is not the case, as if the apparent keeper catches the ball, he must bowl it at the batsman batting at the other end. Lotz has been known to attempt to stump batsman in podex, despite legislation from the IPA (International Podex Association) that there are only three modes of dismissal in podex.
