= Gareth Richards =

British comedian and radio presenter (1979–2023)

- Born: 18 August 1979
- Died: 7 April 2023 (aged 43); London, England
- Website: garethrichards.net

Gareth Richards (18 August 1979 – 7 April 2023) was a British comedian and radio presenter.

== Career ==
Richards was co-host of The Frank Skinner Show on Absolute Radio. He appeared on such BBC shows as Russell Howard's Good News and 4 Stands Up as well as BBC Radio 1, BBC Radio 2 and BBC Radio 4.

His debut Edinburgh Fringe show, Stand Up Between Songs, was nominated for the best newcomer award at the Edinburgh Comedy Awards. The songs from this show were released as an EP, titled These Songs Could be Used in Adverts.

From 2016 to 2017, he hosted Gareth Richards' Lonely Hearts Podcast with David Trent.

== Personal life and death ==
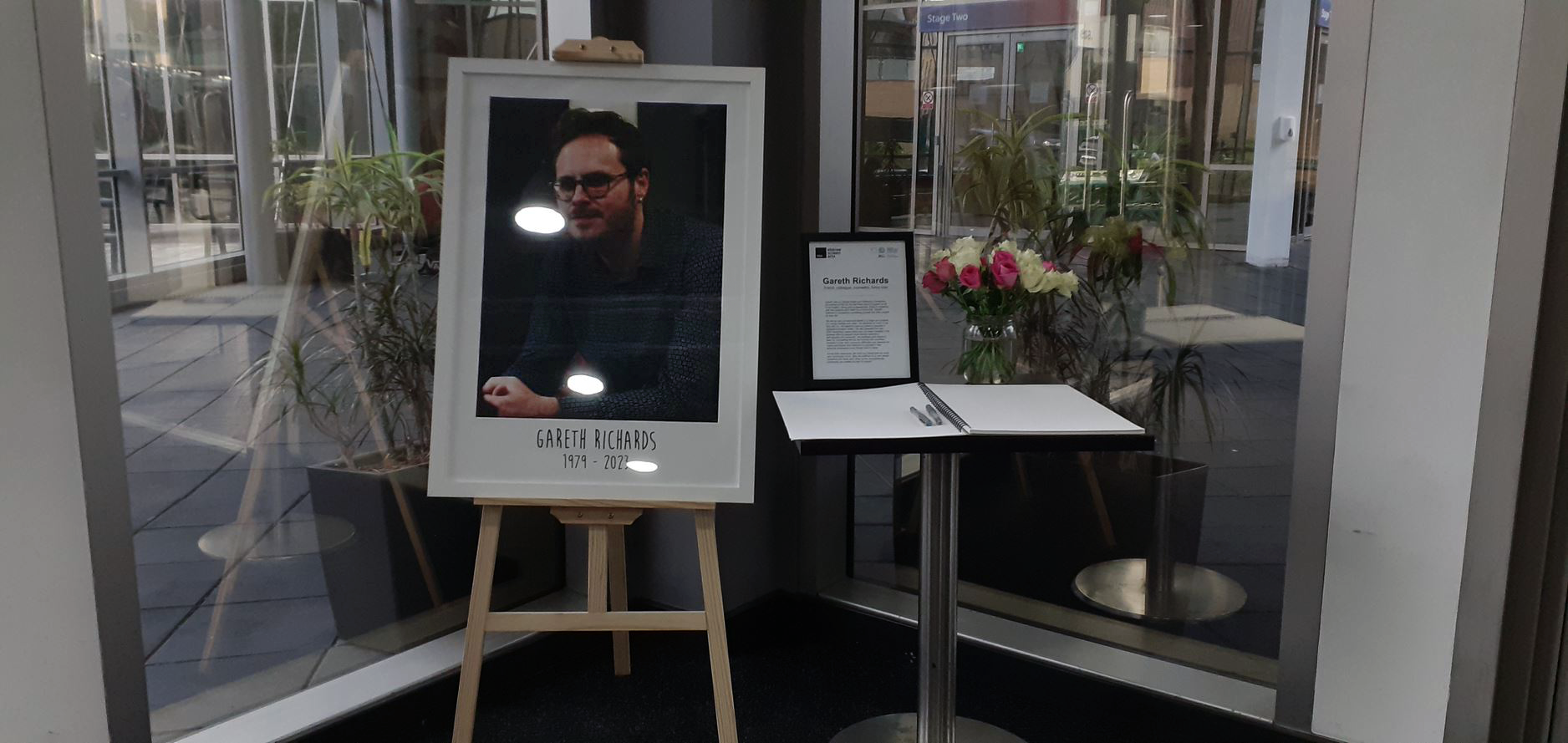
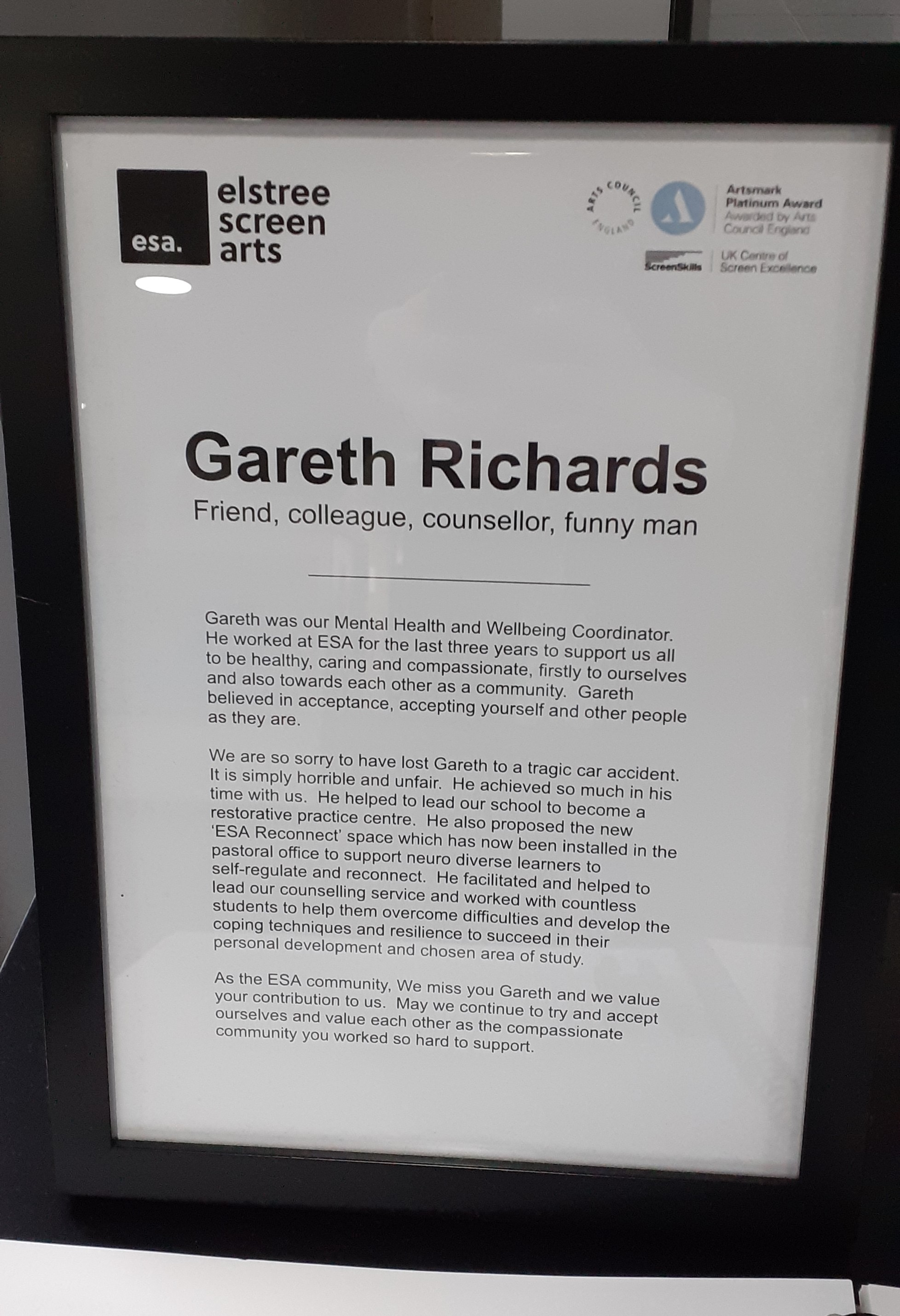
A memorial to Richards at Elstree Screen Arts Academy, May 2023.

Richards lived in Bournemouth with his wife and children. His brother is the cinematographer Joshua James Richards.

Richards was a musician, featuring songs written using the omnichord in his stand-up routines. He also played the Qchord, guitar and harmonica.

On 27 March 2023, Richards was involved in a car crash on the M25 motorway near Heathrow Airport; he suffered severe brain injuries and was placed on life support. He died on 7 April when his life support was removed.

A crowdfunder to set up a trust fund for his sons raised over £18,000 in the first few days, and as of 26 June 2023 had raised over £47,000.

At the Edinburgh Fringe Festival 2023, comedian friends Mark Simmons and Danny Ward staged "A Show for Gareth Richards" in his name, including Frank Skinner, Stewart Lee and Jack Whitehall. The show won the first Victoria Wood award at the Edinburgh Comedy Awards 2023 and raised almost £20,000 for Richards' family.

== Awards ==
- Hackney Empire New Act of the Year (2007, third place)
- Amused Moose Laugh-Off (2007, joint runner-up)
- Newbury Comedy Festival (2007, runner up)
- Leicester Mercury Comedian of the Year (2008, nominee)
- Edinburgh Comedy Award Best Newcomer (2010, nominee)
- Chortle Awards (2010 Best Newcomer sponsored by Impressive PR, nominee)
- Edinburgh Comedy Awards Victoria Wood award (2023, winner)
