= Laughter yoga =

Modern exercise involving prolonged voluntary laughter

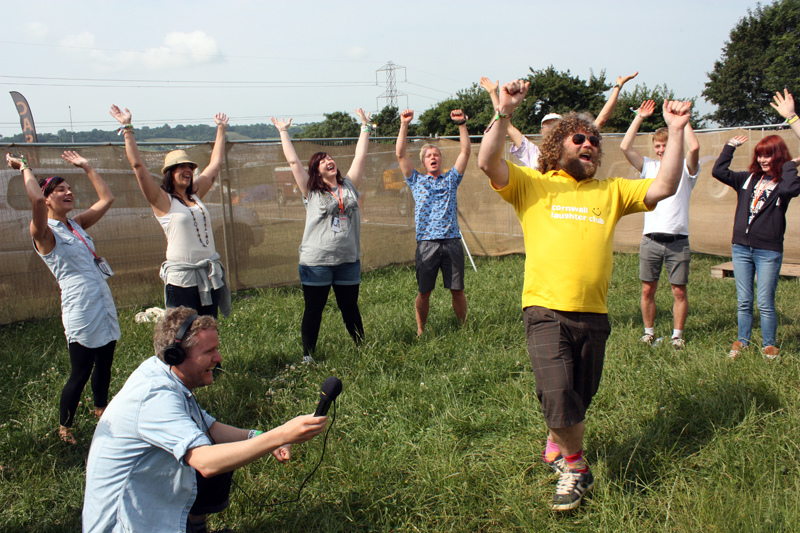
A laughter yoga event in the United Kingdom

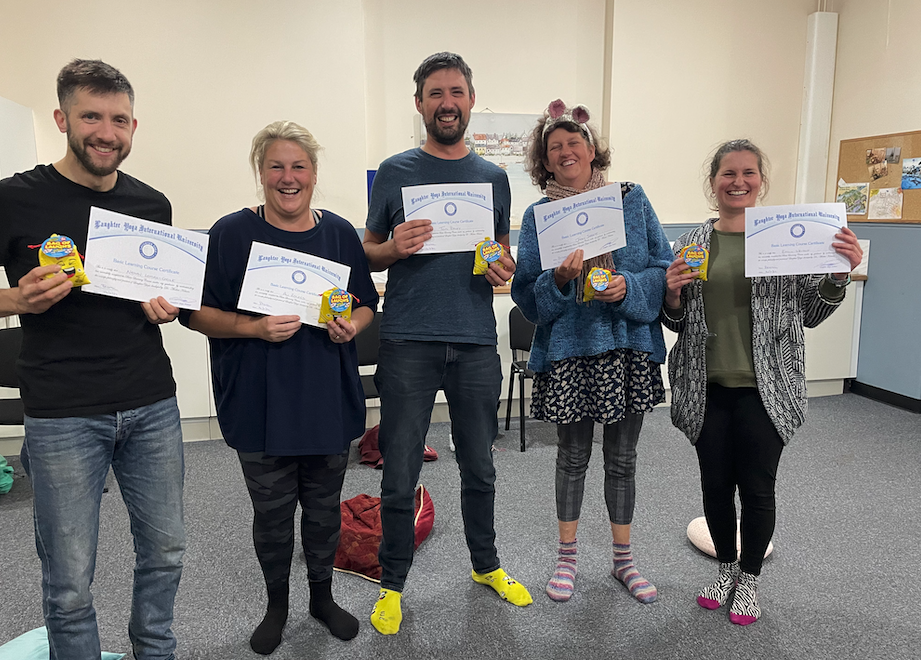
Laughter Yoga Training

Laughter yoga (Hasya yoga) is a laughter exercise program which emphasizes three elements: laughter & playfulness, yogic breath-work, and mindfulness meditation.

Laughter Yoga was introduced in Mumbai, India in 1995 by family physician Madan Kataria and his wife Madhuri. Kataria modernized some of the work of earlier laughter pioneers, who taught very similar concepts starting in the 1960s, in a more structured and a unique manner.

Kataria, his wife Madhuri and three of their best friends started the first laughter social club at a local park. To keep the laughter flowing (after they ran out of jokes), Kataria created the 40 Foundation exercises, which are based on everyday situations, rather than on jokes or comedy. Kataria wrote about his experience in his 2002 book Laugh For No Reason. Additional scientific data and updated information can be found in Kataria's 2021 book, Laughter Yoga: Daily Laughter Practices for Health and Happiness.

Laughter yoga is found in 120+ countries. There are thousands of Laughter Yoga clubs worldwide, in-person and virtual.

== Method ==
Practitioners choose to laugh for their health. Laughter Yoga is performed without any humorous reason to laugh, with one practitioner observing that "the body does not know that we're faking it."

Breathing exercises are used to connect to the diaphragm and to prepare the lungs for laughter. What follows are a series of 'laughter exercises' that combine gentle improvisational movements and playful visualization techniques. Laughter exercises are interspersed with breathing exercises.

== Benefits ==
A 2018 review concludes that group interventions based on laughter Yoga improved depressive symptoms over the short term, but there is no good quality evidence to assess that laughter yoga is more effective than other group-based intervention.

A 2019 review and meta-analysis in the field of laughter-inducing therapies suggests that they are more effective than humorous laughter and can improve depression. However, the quality of the evidence was low.

A meta-analysis published in 2020 concludes that laughter yoga has no adverse effect and could have benefit for older adults in terms of physical function (blood pressure, cortisol level, sleep quality) and psychosocial health (life satisfaction, quality of life, loneliness, death anxiety, depression, mood, happiness).

== See also ==
- Study of laughter
- World Laughter Day
