= Dave's One Night Stand =

- Genre: Stand-up comedy
- Created by: UKTV
- Developed by: Gallowgate Productions
- Directed by: Lucie Vietch
- Theme music composer: Edward Stove
- Opening theme: Dave
- Ending theme: Dave (Instrumental)
- Composer: Pose
- Country of origin: United Kingdom
- Original language: English
- No. of series: 4
- No. of episodes: 20 (list of episodes)

Production
- Executive producer: Ed Forsdick
- Producer: Martin Dance
- Production location: UKTV Studios
- Cinematography: Plut
- Editor: James Collett
- Camera setup: 3SIXTYMEDIA
- Running time: 43 minutes approximately
- Production companies: ITV Studios; Amigo Television; Phil McIntyre Television

Original release
- Network: Dave; Dave HD
- Release: 10 October 2010 – 12 December 2012

Dave's One Night Stand is a British comedy programme made by Amigo Television and Phil McIntyre Television for Dave. The series featured stand-up comedians performing in their hometowns. It was first broadcast for four series from 10 October 2010 until 12 December 2012.

== Overview ==
Each episode featured a stand-up comedian taking the viewers on a tour of their hometown, they then headline a stand-up act at the local theatre with two supporting acts.

== Production ==
For the first series each headline act performed at a different location in the United Kingdom with two supporting acts. From the second the acts performed in the UK or Ireland. Despite being advertised as comedians doing a stand-up show in their home towns, there is the occasional episode where they do not appear in that location (Reginald D. Hunter for example, whose episode was filmed in Edinburgh).

The show was produced by ITV Studios, Amigo Television and Phil McIntyre Entertainment. The theme tune was composed by Edward Stove.

== Transmissions ==
Series	Episodes	Originally released	
Series	Episodes	First released	Last released
1	5	10 October 2010	7 November 2010
2	5	14 April 2011	12 May 2011
3	5	17 November 2011	15 December 2011
4	5	14 November 2012	12 December 2012
