= Chortle Awards =

UK comedy awards

- Awarded for: Best in comedy
- Country: United Kingdom
- Presented by: Chortle
- First award: 2002; 24 years ago
- Website: Official website

The Chortle Awards were set up in 2002 by the comedy website Chortle to honour the best of established stand-up comics currently working in the UK. A panel of reviewers draw up a shortlist, which is presented for public vote at the Chortle website.

== 2002 ==
| Category | Winner | Nominees |
|---|---|---|
| Best Touring Comedian | Ross Noble | Bill Bailey, Rich Hall as Otis Lee Crenshaw, Al Murray |
| Best male circuit comedian | Daniel Kitson | Boothby Graffoe, Lee Mack, Phil Nichol |
| Best female circuit comedian | Jo Enright | Gina Yashere, Jo Caulfield, Julia Morris |
| Best open mic | Des Clarke | Rohan Agalawatta, Steve Williams, Miles Jupp |
| Best compère | Lee Mack | Simon Bligh, Boothby Graffoe, Lee Hurst |
| Best sketch or character act | The League of Gentlemen | Graham Fellows for John Shuttleworth and Brian Appleton, Garth Marenghi, Mackenzie Crook |
| Best contribution by a non-performer | Malcolm Hay, comedy editor | Time Out (nominees: Tommy Sheppard, director of The Stand comedy clubs, Don Ward founder of the Comedy Store, Agraman of The Buzz Club, Manchester |
| People's choice | Ross Noble | runner-up: Daniel Kitson |
| Comedians' comedians | Ross Noble | runner-up: Daniel Kitson |
| Outstanding contribution to comedy | Spike Milligan | |
| Best venues | London (large): Up The Creek; London (small): Amused Moose Soho; Scotland: Stand Glasgow; North of England: XS Malarkey in Manchester; Midlands: Just the Tonic; West/Wales: The Glee Club Cardiff; South: Komedia, Brighton | London (large): The Comedy Store (runner up); London (small): Loonatics at The Asylum (runner up); Scotland: Stand Edinburgh (runner up); North of England: Last Laugh in Sheffield (runner up); Midlands: The Glee Club Birmingham (runner up); West/Wales: Comedy Cavern, Bath (runner up); South: Sanctum, Hove (runner up) |

== 2003 ==
| Category | Winner | Nominees |
|---|---|---|
| Best Newcomer | Matthew Osborn | Greg Davies, Rhod Gilbert |
| Best compère | Chris Addison | Adam Hills, Dara Ó Briain |
| Breakthrough act | Rev Obadiah Steppenwolfe III | Hal Cruttenden, Micky Flanagan) |
| Best headliner | Dara Ó Briain | Jimmy Carr, Phil Nichol |
| Best sketch, variety or character act | Garth Marenghi | Otis Lee Crenshaw, Rev Obadiah Steppenwolfe III |
| Best full-length solo show | Daniel Kitson: Something | Jimmy Carr: Bare-Faced Ambition, Dave Gorman: Dave Gorman's Better World |
| Best contribution by a non-performer | Karen Koren of Edinburgh's Gilded Balloon | |
| People's choice | Ross Noble | |
| Comedians' comedians | Daniel Kitson | |
| Outstanding contribution to comedy | Billy Connolly | |
| Best venues | London (large): The Comedy Store, London (small): Amused Moose Soho, Scotland: Stand Glasgow, North of England: XS Malarkey, Manchester, Midlands: Just The Tonic, West/Wales: The Glee Club Cardiff, South: Komedia, Brighton | |

== 2004 ==
| Category | Winner | Nominees |
|---|---|---|
| Best Newcomer | Waen Shepherd as Gary Le Strange | Stuart Hudson, Tom Wrigglesworth |
| Best Compère | Adam Hills | Stephen K Amos, Jo Caulfield |
| Breakthrough act | Alex Horne | Lucy Porter, Will Smith |
| Best headliner | Dara Ó Briain | Adam Hills, Reginald D Hunter |
| Best sketch, variety or character act | Justin Edwards as Jeremy Lion | Flight Of The Conchords, Oram and Meeten |
| Award for innovation | Dave Gorman | Alfie Joey for his Mini Cabaret, Howard Read |
| Best full-length solo show | Dave Gorman Dave Gorman's Googlewhack Adventure | Demetri Martin: If I..., Dara Ó Briain: I Am Not An Animal |
| Best contribution by a non-performer | Hannah Chambers of Comedy Cafe Management | Agraman The Buzz Manchester, Simon Randall Ha Bloody Ha/Headliners London |
| People's choice | Daniel Kitson | |
| Comedians' comedians | Daniel Kitson | |
| Outstanding contribution to comedy | Lloyd Langford | |
| Best venues | London (large): Comedy Store, London (small): Amused Moose, North of England: XS Malarkey Manchester, South of England: Komedia Brighton, East/Midlands: The Glee Club Birmingham, West of England/Wales: Comedy Cavern Bath, Scotland: The Stand Edinburgh | |

== 2005 ==
| Category | Winner | Nominees |
|---|---|---|
| Best Newcomer | Josie Long | Russell Kane, Isy Suttie |
| Best Compère | Daniel Kitson | Alun Cochrane, Adam Hills |
| Breakthrough act | Rhod Gilbert | Alun Cochrane, Mark Watson |
| Best headliner | Will Smith | Chris Addison, Andrew Maxwell |
| People's Choice | Daniel Kitson | |
| Comics' Comic | Andrew Maxwell | |
| Best sketch, variety or character act | Flight Of The Conchords | Jeremy Lion, Trachtenburg Family Slideshow Players |
| Award for innovation | Mark Watson for his Overambitious 24-Hour Show | Trachtenburg Family Slideshow Players, Wil Hodgson |
| Best full-length solo show | Daniel Kitson's Edinburgh show | Will Smith: 10 Arguments I Should Have Won, Bill Bailey: Part Troll |
| Best off-stage contribution | Ed Bartlam and Charlie Wood, of The Underbelly, Edinburgh | |
| Lifetime Achievement Award | Malcolm Hardee | |
| Venue Awards | North of England: XS Malarkey, Manchester, South of England: The Komedia, Brighton, Midlands: Just The Tonic, Nottingham, Scotland: The Stand, Edinburgh, West and Wales: The Glee Club, Cardiff, London, large venue: The Comedy Store, London, small venue: Comedy Camp | |

== 2006 ==
| Category | Winner | Nominees |
|---|---|---|
| Best Newcomer | James Branch | Lee Bannard, Sarah Millican |
| Best Compère | Russell Howard | Alfie Joey, Andrew Maxwell |
| Best Breakthrough Act | Jason Manford | Hal Cruttenden, Josie Long |
| Best Headliner | Daniel Kitson | Alan Carr, Stewart Lee |
| Best sketch, variety or character act | Justin Edwards as Jeremy Lion | Tim Minchin, We Are Klang |
| Best full-length solo show | Daniel Kitson Daniel Kitson’s Edinburgh stand-up show | Stewart Lee Stewart Lee: 90s Comedian, Tim Minchin Tim Minchin: Dark Side |
| Award for innovation | Robin Ince's Book Club | |
| People's Choice | Daniel Kitson | |
| Comics' Comic | Daniel Kitson | |
| Best off-stage contribution | Malcolm Hay, comedy editor of Time Out | |
| Outstanding Contribution to Comedy | Stewart Lee | |
| Venue Awards | Scotland: The Pleasance, The North of England: Funny Magnet, Middlesbrough, Midlands and East: The Funhouse, Derby, Wales and the West: The Glee Club, Cardiff, South of England: Komedia, Brighton, London small: Outside The Box, Kingston, London large: The Comedy Store | |

== 2007 ==
| Category | Winner | Nominees |
|---|---|---|
| Best Newcomer | Carl Donnelly | Arnab Chanda, Ginger and Black, Pappy's Fun Club |
| Best Breakthrough Act | Josie Long | Greg Davies, Paul Sinha, Shappi Khorsandi |
| Best Compère | Robin Ince | Jarred Christmas, Mark Watson, Stephen K Amos |
| Best Headliner | Jason Byrne | Michael McIntyre, Phil Nichol, Reginald D. Hunter |
| Best Sketch, Variety or Character Act | We Are Klang | Count Arthur Strong, Jeremy Lion, Joanna Neary |
| Best Full-Length Feature Show | The Mighty Boosh Tour | Doug Stanhope, Mark Thomas: As Used On The Famous Nelson Mandela, We Are Klang: Klang Bang |
| Award for innovation | Free Fringe | James Campbell’s Comedy 4 Kids, Maxwell’s Full Mooners, Tim Fitzhigham |
| Best off-stage contribution | Free Fringe | BAC, Brett Vincent, Alex Rochford and Paul Byrne for Maxwell’s Full Mooners, Toby Hadoke for XS Malarkey |
| Outstanding Contribution to Comedy | Linda Smith | |
| Venue Awards | Scotland: The Stand, Edinburgh, The North: Long Live Comedy, Newcastle, Midlands and East: Spa-Tickes, Leamington Spa, Wales and the West: Glee Club, Cardiff, South: Comedy Cottage, Redhill, London small: The Funny Side Of Covent Garden, London large: The Comedy Store | |

== 2008 ==
| Category | Winner | Nominees |
|---|---|---|
| Best Newcomer | Holly Walsh | Nat Luurtsema, Greg McHugh, Jack Whitehall |
| Best Breakthrough Act | Jon Richardson | Tom Basden, Lloyd Langford, Terry Saunders |
| Best Compère | Stephen Grant | Stephen K Amos, Jarred Christmas, Greg Davies |
| Best Headliner | Michael McIntyre | Rhod Gilbert, Jim Jefferies, Glenn Wool |
| Best Sketch, Variety or Character Act | Pappy's Fun Club | Fat Tongue, Lee Fenwick as Mick Sergeant, Ugly Kid |
| Best Full-Length Feature Show | Stewart Lee: 41st Best Stand-Up | Tom Basden Won't Say Anything, Psister Psycho, Terry Saunders: Missed Connection |
| Award for innovation | Laughter In Odd Places | Arthur Smith for ArthurArt, Gently Progressive Behemoth (Edinburgh show), We Need Answers (Edinburgh show)) |
| Best theatre tour | Dara Ó Briain | Alan Carr: Tooth Fairy, Al Murray at the London Palladium, Frank Skinner |
| Offstage Contribution | Toby Hadoke of XS Malarkey, Manchester | |
| Award for artistic integrity | Hans Teeuwen | |
| Outstanding Contribution to Comedy | The I’m Sorry I Haven’t a Clue team | |
| Venue Awards | London (large): Comedy Store, London (small) : Falling Down With Laughter, South: Komedia, Midlands/East: Derby Funhouse, Wales and the West: The Glee Club, Cardiff, North: XS Malarkey, Manchester, Scotland: Edinburgh Stand | |

== 2009 ==
| Category | Winner | Nominees |
|---|---|---|
| PIAS Comedy Award for best newcomer | Seann Walsh | Mike Wozniak, Pippa Evans, Daniel Simonsen |
| Breakthrough Act | Sarah Millican | Andrew O'Neill, Bridget Christie, Carl Donnelly |
| Best Compère | Rufus Hound | Dan Nightingale, Alun Cochrane, Stephen Grant |
| Student Comedy Award | Joe Lycett | |
| FremantleMedia Enterprises Award for Best Headliner | Rhod Gilbert | Andrew Maxwell, Paul Sinha, Milton Jones |
| Best Sketch, Variety or Character Act | Tim Minchin | Count Arthur Strong, Pippa Evans, Wilson Dixon |
| Best Full Show | Tim Minchin: Ready For This | Rhod Gilbert And The Award-Winning Mince Pie, Richard Herring: The Headmaster's Son, David O'Doherty: Let's Comedy |
| Award for innovation | Robin Ince for Nine Lessons And Carols For Godless People | |
| Best theatre show | Russell Howard: Dingledodies | Dylan Moran: This Is It, Dara Ó Briain, Frankie Boyle |
| Best Off-Stage Contribution | Michael Legge for his blog | |
| Award for artistic integrity | John Hegley | |
| Outstanding Contribution to Comedy | The I’m Sorry I Haven’t a Clue team | |
| Best use of stand-up on TV or radio | Live At The Apollo | Mark Watson Makes the World Substantially Better, 4 Stands Up, Another Case of Milton Jones |
| Best DVD | Dara Ó Briain Talks Funny | Stewart Lee: 41st Best Stand-up, Tim Minchin: So Fucking Rock, Frank Skinner Stand-Up |
| Venue Awards | Scotland: Stand, Edinburgh, The North: XS Malarkey, Manchester, Midlands and The East: Glee, Birmingham, Wales and The West: Glee, Cardiff, The South: Komedia, Brighton, London large venue: Soho Theatre, London small venue: Porthole Comedy Club, Kilburn | |

== 2010 ==
| Category | Winner | Nominees |
|---|---|---|
| Best Newcomer sponsored by Impressive PR | Joe Lycett | Ivo Graham, Naz Osmanaglu, Gareth Richards |
| Breakthrough Act sponsored by PIAS | Kevin Bridges | Angelos Epithemiou, Pete Johansson, Seann Walsh |
| Best Headliner | Sarah Millican | Milton Jones, Andrew Lawrence, Phil Nichol |
| Best Compère | Jarred Christmas | Dan Atkinson, Jason Cook, Stephen Grant |
| Best Sketch or Character Act | Idiots Of Ants | Angelos Epithemiou, Colin Hoult, Pajama Men |
| Best Music or Variety Act | Tim Minchin | Wilson Dixon, Frisky & Mannish, Hans Teeuwen |
| Award for innovation | Robin Ince for Nine Lessons And Carols For Godless People | |
| Best show | Tom Wrigglesworth's Open Return Letter To Richard Branson | The Hotel, Kim Noble Will Die, Louis CK, Pajama Men: Last Stand To Reason |
| Off-Stage Contribution | Nica Burns | |
| Award for artistic integrity | Kim Noble | |
| Outstanding Contribution to Comedy | Armando Iannucci | |
| Best Tour | Michael McIntyre | Simon Amstell: Do Nothing, Russell Brand: Scandalous, Dylan Moran: What It Is |
| TV and radio award | Michael McIntyre's Comedy Roadshow | The News Quiz, Russell Howard's Good News, Stewart Lee's Comedy Vehicle |
| Best DVD | Rhod Gilbert's Award-Winning Mince Pie | Ed Byrne: Different Class, Louis CK: Chewed Up, Dylan Moran: What It Is |
| Venue Awards | Scotland - Edinburgh Stand, The North - XS Malarkey, Midlands and the East - Glee Birmingham, Wales and the West - Komedia Bath, The South - Upstairs At The Three And Ten, London large - Tabernacle, London small - Knock 2 Bag at Bar FM | |

== 2011 ==
| Category | Winner | Nominees |
|---|---|---|
| Best Newcomer | Diane Spencer | Henry Ginsberg, Iain Stirling, Tim Shishodia |
| Breakthrough Act | The Boy With Tape On His Face | Josh Widdicombe, Nick Helm, Stuart Goldsmith |
| Best Headliner | Milton Jones | Andrew Lawrence, Craig Campbell, Tom Stade |
| Best Compère | Stephen Grant | Jason Cook, Seann Walsh, Susan Calman |
| Best Sketch or Character Act | Late Night Gimp Fight | Adam Riches, Jonny Sweet, Tom Binns as Ian D Montford |
| Best Music or Variety Act | Tim Minchin | The Boy With Tape On His Face, Raymond & Mr Timpkins Revue, Showstopper! The Improvised Musical |
| Best show | Kevin Eldon Is Titting About | Bo Burnham: Words, Words, Words, Des Bishop: My Dad Was Nearly James Bond, Greg Davies: Firing Cheeseballs At A Dog, Russell Kane: Smokescreens and Castles |
| Best Tour | Tim Minchin and His Orchestra | Bill Bailey: Dandelion Mind, Dara Ó Briain, Lee Mack |
| TV and radio award | Michael McIntyre's Comedy Roadshow | Getting On, News Quiz, The Trip |
| Best DVD | Stewart Lee: If You Prefer A Milder Comedian Please Ask For One | Bill Bailey: Dandelion Mind, Simon Amstell: Do Nothing, Tim Minchin: Ready For This |
| Internet Award | Richard Herring: As It Occurs To Me podcast | Alan Partridge: Mid Morning Matters, Gary Delaney's Twitter feed, The Peacock & Gamble Podcast |
| Award for innovation | Invisible Dot | |
| Off-Stage Contribution | Karen Koren of the Gilded Balloon | |
| Judges' Award | Chris Sievey for Frank Sidebottom | |
| Outstanding Contribution to Comedy | Victoria Wood | |
| Student Comedy Award | Adam Hess | |
| Venue Awards | Best purpose-built venue in London: Comedy Store, London: 99 Club Leicester Square, South: Brighton Komedia, Midlands and East: Birmingham Glee Club, Wales and the West: Cardiff Glee Club, North: Manchester Comedy Store, Scotland: The Stand Edinburgh | |

== 2012 ==
In 2012, Charlie Brooker won the TV award for Black Mirror and his work on 10 O'Clock Live, while Stewart Lee was awarded "best standup DVD" for the second series of Stewart Lee's Comedy Vehicle. Lee's former comic partner Richard Herring won the internet award. Dylan Moran won "best tour", Tim Key was awarded "best show", and Simon Munnery received the award for innovation. Prior to the awards, Chortle responded to accusations of sexism (of 54 nominees, only two were women). Editor Steve Bennett described the controversy as "a storm we never saw coming."

| Category | Winner | Nominees |
|---|---|---|
| Best Newcomer | Patrick Cahill | Mark Cooper-Jones, Mark Stephenson, Matt Rees |
| Breakthrough Act | Tony Law | Adam Riches, Humphrey Ker, Sam Simmons |
| Club Comic | Alun Cochrane | Adam Bloom, Dana Alexander, Hal Cruttenden, Michael Fabbri |
| Best Compère | Susan Calman | Jimmy McGhie, Ray Peacock, Toby Hadoke |
| Best Sketch or Character Act | Idiots of Ants | Adam Riches, Beta Males, Humphrey Ker |
| Best Music or Variety Act | The Rubberbandits | Kunt and the Gang, La Soirée, New Art Club |
| Best show | Tim Key, Masterslut | Bring Me the Head Of Adam Riches; Doug Stanhope; Sam Simmons, Meanwhile |
| Best Tour | Dylan Moran, Yeah, Yeah | Dave Gorman's Powerpoint Presentation; Jerry Seinfeld's European tour; Mark Thomas, Walking the Wall; Stephen Merchant, Hello Ladies |
| TV Award | Fresh Meat, Sorry, I've Got No Head, Stewart Lee's Comedy Vehicle | |
| Radio Award | The Infinite Monkey Cage | Danny Baker, John Finnemore's Souvenir Programme, Party |
| Internet Award | Richard Herring | Business Mouse, Do the Right Thing, The Fast Show |
| Best Stand-Up DVD | Stewart Lee's Comedy Vehicle, Series 2 | Dylan Moran, Yeah, Yeah; Greg Davies, Firing Cheeseballs at a Dog, Tim Minchin and the Heritage Orchestra Live at the Albert Hall |
| Award for innovation | Simon Munnery for La Concepta | Sanderson Jones for comedysale.com, Set List, The Wrestling |
| Off-Stage Contribution | Mick Perrin | |
| Outstanding Contribution to Comedy | John Lloyd | |
| Venue Awards | The Comedy Store (London, purpose-built); 99 Club, Leicester Square (London club); Komedia, Brighton (The South); Komedia, Bath (Wales and the West); The Glee Club, Birmingham (Midlands and the East); XS Malarkey (The North); The Pleasance (Scotland) | |

== 2013 ==
| Category | Winner | Nominees |
|---|---|---|
| Best Newcomer | Lucy Beaumont | Adam Hess, Sunil Patel, Tommy Rowson |
| Student Comedy Award | Rio Bauer | Nathan Willcock and Adam Todd (runners-up) Conor Neville, Tim Renkow, Evelyn Mok, Matilda Wnek and Richard Perry (finalists) |
| Breakthrough Act | Doctor Brown | Pat Cahill, Daniel Simonsen, David Trent |
| Club Comic | Tony Law | Susan Calman, Phil Nichol, Paul Sinha |
| Best Compère | Susan Calman | Jarred Christmas, Joe Lycett, Jonathan Mayor |
| Best Sketch or Character Act | Pappy's | Doctor Brown, Brian Gittins, Marcel Lucont |
| Music and Variety Award | The Boy With Tape On His Face | The Horne Section, Loretta Maine, The Rubberbandits |
| Best Show | Tony Law Maximum Nonsense | Susan Calman: This Lady's Not For Turning, Jim Jefferies: Fully Functional, Pappy's: Last Show Ever |
| Best Tour | Stewart Lee: Carpet Remnant World | Boy With Tape On His Face: More Tape, Greg Davies: The Back Of My Mum's Head, Mark Thomas: Bravo Figaro |
| TV Award | The Thick Of It | Alan Partridge: the Sky Atlantic specials, Fresh Meat, Peep Show |
| Radio Award | John Finnemore's Souvenir Programme | Irish Micks And Legends, The Horne Section, The News Quiz |
| Internet Award | Richard Herring's Leicester Square Theatre Podcast | Pappy's Flatshare Slamdown, Peacock & Gamble's Edinburgh podcast, Stuart Goldsmith: The Comedians' Comedian Podcast |
| Best DVD | Fist of Fun Series 2 | Louis CK: Live At The Beacon, Stewart Lee: Carpet Remnant World |
| Award for innovation | Louis CK for cutting out the middle man | Alternative Comedy Memorial Society, Weirdo's comedy club |
| Lifetime Achievement: Galton & Simpson | Hancock's Half Hour, Steptoe & Son | |
| Off-Stage Contribution | Tommy Sheppard, The Stand | |
| Venue Awards | The Comedy Store (London), The 99 Club (London), Komedia (Brighton), Glee (Birmingham), Komedia (Bath), XS Malarkey (Manchester) and The Pleasance (Scotland) | |

== 2014 ==
| Category | Winner | Nominees |
|---|---|---|
| Best Newcomer | Sofie Hagen | Jonny Pelham, Pierre Novellie, Tim Renkow |
| Best Compère | Ed Gamble | Barry Ferns, Joe Henan, Ray Peacock |
| Breakthrough Act sponsored by Time Out | Sara Pascoe | John Kearns, Katherine Ryan, Romesh Ranganathan |
| Club Comic | Paul Sinha | Ed Gamble, Elis James, Felicity Ward |
| Best Sketch, Improv or Character Act | Austentatious | Brian Gittins, John Kearns, Marcel Lucont |
| Music and Variety Award | The Horne Section | Bo Burnham, The Noise Next Door, Rachel Parris |
| Internet Award | Richard Herring’s Leicester Square Theatre Podcast | Alex Horne Breaks The News, Stuart Goldsmith for The Comedians’ Comedian podcast, Netflix |
| Best DVD | Simon Amstell: Live At The BBC | The Alternative Comedy Experience, Bo Burnham: What, Russell Brand: Messiah Complex |
| Best Show | Bridget Christie: A Bic For Her | John Kearns: Sight Gags For Perverts, Louis CK, Mark Thomas: 100 Acts Of Minor Dissent |
| Best Tour | Micky Flanagan: Back In The Game | Barry Humphries: Dame Edna’s Farewell Tour; Bo Burnham: What; Harry Hill: Sausage Time |
| Radio Award | Bridget Christie Minds The Gap | Mark Thomas: Bravo Figaro; Mark Steel's In Town; Andrew Maxwell’s Public Enemies |
| TV Award | Fresh Meat | The Alternative Comedy Experience, Badults, Toast Of London |
| Industry Award | Chris Evans from Go Faster Stripe | |
| Venue Awards | Scotland: Edinburgh Stand, The North: XS Malarkey, Manchester, Wales and the West: Cardiff Glee Club, Midlands and the East: Birmingham Glee Club, The South: Brighton Komedia, London large venue: Soho Theatre, London club: 99 Club Leicester Square | |

== 2015 ==
| Category | Winner | Nominees |
|---|---|---|
| Best Newcomer | Gein’s Family Gift Shop | Alex Edelman, Dane Baptiste, Phil Jerrod and Steen Raskopoulos |
| Breakthrough Act | James Acaster | Luisa Omielan, Nish Kumar and Phil Ellis |
| Club Comic | Katherine Ryan | Carl Donnelly, Jeff Innocent and Martin Mor |
| Best Compère | John Robins | Ed Gamble, Mark Olver, Nish Kumar and Zoe Lyons |
| Music and Variety Award | Nick Helm | Jess Robinson and Kirsty Newton for Jess Robinson: Mighty Voice, Margaret Thatcher: Queen Of Soho, and Nick Mohammed for Dracula! (Mr Swallow: The Musical |
| Best Sketch, Improv or Character Act | Marcel Lucont | Funz And Gamez, Gein’s Family Gift Shop, and Steen Raskopoulos |
| Best Show | James Acaster: Recognise | Funz And Gamez, Kim Noble: You Are Not Alone, Luisa Omeilan: Am I Right Ladies? and Simon Amstell: To Be Free |
| Best Tour | Bridget Christie: A Bic For Her/An Ungrateful Woman double bill | Dawn French: 30 Million Minutes; Mark Thomas:Cuckooed and Katherine Ryan: Glam Role Model |
| Internet Award | QI’s No Such Thing As A Fish | Comedian’s Comedian with Stuart Goldsmith, Richard Herring's Leicester Square Theatre Podcast, and The Political Party with Matt Forde |
| Radio Award | Bridget Christie Minds The Gap | Elis James & John Robins on XFM; Susan Calman is Convicted and Tom Wrigglesworth: Utterly At Odds With The Universe |
| TV Award, sponsored by Sue Terry Voices | Inside No. 9 | Harry & Paul’s Story Of The Twos, Toast Of London and Uncle |
| Award for Innovation | Alex Horne for Monsieur Butterfly | Funz And Gamez; Kim Noble for You're Not Alone |
| Best DVD | Stewart Lee's Comedy Vehicle Series 3 | Harry Hill for Sausage Time; Monty Python Live (Mostly): One Down Five To Go; and The Trip to Italy |
| Book Award | Ayoade on Ayoade | Hopeful by Omid Djalili, My Prefect Cousin: A Biography of Paul Hamilton by Kevin Eldon and Francesca Martinez: What The **** Is Normal |
| Venue Awards | Best large club: 99 Club Leicester Square; Best small club: Angel Comedy Club; Best club night: Bent Double, Brighton: Event of the year: The Monty Python reunion gigs at the O2 Arena | |

== 2016 ==
| Category | Winner | Nominees |
|---|---|---|
| Best Newcomer | Daisy Earl | Jordan Brookes, Kae Kurd, Lolly Adefope, Michael Stranney aka Daniel Duffy |
| Best Compère | Jarred Christmas | David Morgan, Kiri Pritchard-McLean, Laura Lexx |
| Breakthrough Act | Joseph Morpurgo | Al Porter, Daphne, Spencer Jones |
| Club Comic | Zoe Lyons | Adam Hess, Felicity Ward, Gary Little, Pierre Novellie |
| Music and Variety Award | Pippa Evans | Comedians' Cinema Club, Spencer Jones, Weirdos |
| Best Sketch, Improv or Character Act | The Showstoppers | Daphne, Lolly Adefope, Massive Dad |
| Best Show | Joe Lycett: That's The Way A-ha, A-ha, Joe Lycett | James Acaster: Represent, Joseph Morpurgo: Soothing Sounds for Baby, Mark Steel: Who Do I Think I Am?, Tom Parry: Yellow T-shirt |
| Best Tour | Katherine Ryan: Kathbum | Bill Bailey: Limboland, Dara Ó Briain: Crowd Tickler, Kevin Bridges: A Whole Different Story |
| Internet Award | No Such Thing As A Fish | The Beef and Dairy Network podcast, The Parapod with Ray Peacock and Barry Dodds, Turtle Canyon Comedy |
| Radio Award | Just A Minute | News Quiz, Mark Steel's In Town, Simon Evans Goes To Market |
| TV Award, sponsored by Sue Terry Voices | Peter Kay’s Car Share | Catastrophe, Inside No 9, Sky Arts' Christmas comedy shorts |
| Book and Publishing Award | Standard Issue | Bridget Christie: A Book For Her, Limmy's Daft Wee Stories, Off The Mic, by Deborah Frances White and Marsha Shandur |
| Award for Innovation | Joseph Morpurgo: Soothing Sounds For Baby | Bryony Kimmings and Tim Grayburn for Fake It Til You Make It, Foxdog Studios Ltd, Richard Gadd for Waiting For Gaddot |
| Comedian's Comedian | Joseph Morpurgo | |
| Outstanding Contribution to Comedy | Vic Reeves and Bob Mortimer | |
| Best DVD | Stewart Lee's Comedy Vehicle Series 3 | Harry Hill for Sausage Time; Monty Python Live (Mostly): One Down Five To Go; and The Trip to Italy |
| Event of the Year | Peter Kay’s Phoenix Nights Live | Dave Chappelle in Hammersmith Apollo, Mel Brooks in the West End, Tom Basden's Crocodile at the Manchester International Festival, Weird Al Yankovic at Hammersmith Apollo |
| Best Venues | London: Soho Theatre: South: Komedia Brighton; North: Frog and Bucket; East and Midlands: Birmingham Glee; Wales and West: Komedia Bath; Scotland: Stand Edinburgh | |
| Best Club Nights | London: 99 Club Soho: South: Bent Double, Brighton Komedia; North: XS Malarkey; East and Midlands: The Comedy Cow Milton Keynes; Wales and West: Buffalo Bar Cardiff; Scotland: Red Raw at Glasgow Stand | |

== 2017 ==
| Category | Winner | Nominees |
|---|---|---|
| Best Newcomer | Tom Ward | Jayde Adams, Sophie Willan, Bilal Zafar |
| Best Compère | Justin Moorhouse | Laura Lexx, David Morgan, Kiri Pritchard-McLean |
| Breakthrough Act | Joel Dommett | Scott Gibson, Tez Ilyas, Suzi Ruffell |
| Club Comic | Carl Donnelly | Carey Marx, Phil Nichol, Pierre Novellie |
| Music and Variety Award | Pippa Evans | Comedians' Cinema Club, Spencer Jones, Weirdos |
| Character and Variety | Lolly Adefope | Spencer Jones, Nick Mohammed, Emma Sidi |
| Best Show | Bridget Christie: Because You Demanded It | David Baddiel: My Family Not The Sitcom, Richard Gadd: Monkey See Monkey Do, Kieran Hodgson: Maesto, Stewart Lee: Content Provider |
| Best Tour | Romesh Ranganathan: Irrational | Billy Connolly: High Horse, Reeves & Mortimer: Poignant Moments, Mark Thomas: The Red Shed |
| Internet Award | Adam Buxton's podcast | The Guilty Feminist, The Parapod, NextUp |
| Radio Award | Elis James & John Robins - Radio X | Alexei Sayle's Imaginary Sandwich Bar, Deborah Frances-White Rolls The Dice, Mark Steel's In Town |
| TV Award | Fleabag | Alan Partridge's Scissored Isle, Mum, People Just Do Nothing |
| Best TV Comedy Entertainment | Taskmaster | Alan Davies: As Yet Untitled, Dave Gorman: Modern Life Is Goodish, Stewart Lee's Comedy Vehicle |
| Best TV Actor | Olivia Colman - Fleabag/Flowers | Lesley Manville (Mum), Diane Morgan (Motherland/Philomena Cunk), Phoebe Waller-Bridge (Fleabag) |
| TV Comedian | Richard Ayoade | Greg Davies, Stewart Lee, Romesh Ranganathan, Katherine Ryan |
| Book Award | Sara Pascoe: Animal | Alan Partridge: Nomad, Shappi Khorsandi - Nina Is Not OK, Isy Suttie - The Actual One |
| Comedian's Comedian | Richard Gadd | |
| Event of the Year | Comedians Boxing | |
| Off-stage contribution | Noel Faulkner | |
| Best Venues | London: 99 Club Leicester Square/The Bill Murray: South: Komedia Brighton; North: Frog and Bucket (Manchester); East and Midlands: Birmingham Glee; Wales and West: The Glee (Cardiff); Scotland: The Stand (Edinburgh) | |
| Best Club Nights | London: 99 Club Ku Bar: South: Bent Double (Brighton); North: XS Malarkey (Manchester); East and Midlands: No winner (insufficient votes cast) :*Wales and West: Buffalo Comedy Club (Cardiff); Scotland: Red Raw (Edinburgh) | |

== 2018 ==
The winners were announced in March 2018, and marked the first time that women had won more than half of the award in the live comedy category.

| Category | Winner | Nominees |
|---|---|---|
| Best Newcomer | Rob Kemp | |
| Best Compère | Kiri Pritchard-McLean | |
| Breakthrough Act | Mae Martin | |
| Club Comedian | Kiri Pritchard-McLean | |
| Music and Variety Award | Flo and Joan | |
| Character, Improv, and Sketch | Natalie Palamides | |
| Best Show | Hannah Gadsby: Nanette | |
| Best Tour | Greg Davies: You Magnificent Beast | |
| Comedian's Comedian | Jordan Brookes | |
| Event of the Year | Tony Law and Friends in the Battle for Icetopia | |
| Off-stage contribution | Hot Water Comedy Club | |
| TV Comedian | Joe Lycett | |
| Book Award | How Not to Be a Boy by Robert Webb | |
| Internet Award | Richard Herring's Leicester Square Theatre Podcast | |
| Radio Award | Mark Steel's in Town | |
| TV Award | Inside No. 9 | |
| Best Venues | London: The Bill Murray; The North: Hot Water Comedy Club, Liverpool; The South: Brighton Komedia; Midlands and the East: Norwich Playhouse; Scotland: The Stand, Edinburgh | |
| Best Clubs | London: 99 Club Leicester Square; The North: XS Malarkey, Manchester; Wales and West: Buffalo Comedy, Cardiff | |
| Best Club Nights | London: Quantum Leopard; The North: Comedy Balloon, Manchester; The South: Goat Comedy, Brighton | |

== 2019 ==
The winners were announced in March 2019.

| Category | Winner | Nominees |
|---|---|---|
| Best Newcomer | Sarah Keyworth | |
| Best Compère | Kiri Pritchard-McLean | |
| Breakthrough Act | Kiri Pritchard-McLean | |
| Club Comedian | Suzi Ruffell | |
| Music and Variety Award | Rachel Parris | |
| Character, Improv, and Sketch | Lazy Susan | |
| Best Show | James Acaster: Cold Lasagne Hate Myself 1999 | |
| Best Tour | League Of Gentlemen Live Again | |
| Comedian's Comedian | James Acaster | |
| TV Comedian | Katherine Ryan | |
| Book Award | Made In Scotland by Billy Connolly | |
| Internet Award | Adam Buxton's podcast | |
| Radio Award | The News Quiz | |
| TV Award | Inside No 9 | |
| Event of the Year | Hannah Gadsby’s Nanette arriving on Netflix | |
| Off-stage contribution | Kenny O’Brien, outgoing general manager of The Stand comedy clubs in Edinburgh, Glasgow and Newcastle. | |
| Student Award | Erika Ehler | |
| Best Venues | London: 99 Club Leicester Square; South: Brighton Komedia; North: Frog and Bucket, Manchester; Midlands: Birmingham Glee; Wales and West: Glee Cardiff; Scotland: The Stand, Edinburgh | |
| Best Club Nights | London: Quantum Leopard at 2Northdown; South: Goat Comedy Club, Brighton; North: XS Malarkey, Manchester; Midlands: Jericho Comedy, Oxford; Wales and West: Buffalo Comedy Club, Cardiff; Scotland: Red Raw | |

== 2020 ==
The winners were announced in March 2020.

| Category | Winner | Nominees |
|---|---|---|
| Best Newcomer | Brodi Snook | Charlie George, David Eagle, Patrick Spicer, Toussaint Douglass |
| Best Compère | Kiri Pritchard-McLean | Dan Nightingale, Ian Smith, Mick Ferry, Rich Wilson |
| Breakthrough Act | Jessica Fostekew | Jonny Pelham, London Hughes, Janine Harouni |
| Club Comedian | Zoe Lyons | Adam Rowe, Larry Dean, TanyaLee Davis, Tez Ilyas |
| Music and Variety Award | Flo & Joan | Catherine Cohen, Jonny & The Baptists Joz Norris, Spencer Jones’s 50-Minute Disco Experiment |
| Character, Improv, and Sketch | The Delightful Sausage | Colin Hoult as Anna Mann, Goodbear, Jack Tucker, Tarot |
| Best Show | Jessica Fostekew: Hench | Jordan Brookes: I’ve Got Nothing, Catherine Cohen: The Twist...? She's Gorgeous, Max & Ivan: Commitment, Jonny Pelham: Off Limits |
| Best Tour | Rhod Gilbert: The Book Of John | Ben Elton, Frank Skinner: Showbiz, Hannah Gadsby: Douglas, Stewart Lee: Snowflake/Tornado |
| Comedian's Comedian | Zach Zucker as Jack Tucker | |
| TV Comedian | Bob Mortimer | Greg Davies, Katherine Ryan, Romesh Ranganathan, Tom Allen |
| Book Award | Who Am I Again? by Lenny Henry | Happiness and Tears: The Ken Dodd Story by Louis Barfe, Son Of A Silverback by Russell Kane |
| Internet Award | Michael Spicer: The Room Next Door | Do The Right Thing, Inside the Comedian, Off Menu podcast with James Acaster and Ed Gamble, 100 Reasons To Hate.. with Ian Smith |
| Radio Award | Dead Ringers, Mark Steel's in Town | Count Arthur Strong's Radio Show!, Kevin Eldon Will See You Now, The Skewer |
| TV Award | Fleabag | Cunk & Other Humans On 2019, Derry Girls, Harry Hill’s Clubnite, A Year In The Life Of A Year |
| Off-stage contribution | Brid Kirby, who runs Fight In The Dog productions and is head of comedy for the Vault festival | |
| Best Venues | London: The Bill Murray; North: Hot Water, Liverpool; South: Brighton Komedia; Midlands and East: Birmingham Glee; Scotland: Monkey Barrel, Edinburgh; Wales: Cardiff Glee | |
| Best Comedy Nights | London: 99 Club at Ku Bar; North: XS Malarkey, Manchester; South: Goat Comedy, Hove; Midlands and East: The Jericho, Oxford; Scotland: Red Raw, Glasgow Stand | |
| Best Themed Comedy Nights | London: Stamptown, an anarchic alternative night at the Moth Club; North: Barking Tales at the Zombie Shack, Manchester, which has a focus on mental health; South: Bent Double, an LGBT night at Brighton Komedia; Midlands and East: Comedy Carousel at Birmingham Glee | |

== 2021 ==
Awards were made despite the COVID-19 lockdown recognising comedians who triumphed despite the circumstances.

Alex Horne, Alistair Green, Archie Henderson as Jazz Emu, Catherine Bohart for Gigless, The Covid Arms, Fergus Craig, The Isolation Song Contest, Janey Godley, John Robertson, Marcus Brigstocke and Rachel Parris, Mark Olver, Mark Watson, Munya Chawawa, Petrichor, Richard Herring, Rob Sedgebeer, Robin Ince and Cosmic Shambles Network, Stevie Martin, Tim Key, Toussaint Douglass, The Warren, Brighton were all recognised as "legends of lockdown" with awards made by video.

== 2022 ==
The winners were announced in March 2022.

| Category | Winner | Nominees |
|---|---|---|
| Best Newcomer | Celya AB | |
| Best Compère | Zoe Lyons | |
| Breakthrough Act | Maisie Adam | |
| Club Comedian | Adam Rowe | |
| Music and Variety Award | Flo and Joan | |
| Best Show | Alfie Brown: Sensitive Man | |
| Best Tour | Bill Bailey: Summer Larks | |
| Comedian's Comedian | Phil Jerrod | |
| TV Comedian | Bob Mortimer | |
| Book Award | And Away... by Bob Mortimer | |
| Podcast Award | Have A Word | |
| Social Media Award | Rosie Holt | |
| Radio Award | The News Quiz | |
| TV Award | Ghosts | |
| Off-stage contribution | Paul O'Byrne | |

== 2023 ==
The winners were announced in February 2023.

| Category | Winner | Nominees |
|---|---|---|
| Offstage Contribution | Peter Grahame | |
| Comedian's Comedian | Janey Godley | |
| Best Newcomer | Lorna Rose Treen | Joshua Bethania, Pravanya Pillay, Firuz Ozari |
| Breakthrough Act | Alasdair Beckett-King | Chloe Petts, Jordan Gray, Leo Reich, Lara Ricote, Vittorio Angelone |
| Best Compere | Zoe Lyons | Mark Olver, Rich Wilson, Thanyia Moore |
| Club Comedian | Nina Gilligan | Emmanuel Sonubi, Ian Stone, Jeff Innocent, Markus Birdman |
| Variety or Character Act | Jazz Emu | Crybabies, Delightful Sausage, Flat & The Curves, Frankie Thompson |
| Best Show | Seann Walsh: Is Dead. Happy Now? | Crybabies: Bagbeard; Frankie Thompson: Catts; Glenn Moore: Will You Still Need Me...; Jordan Gray: Is It A Bird |
| Best Tour | Dara Ó Briain: So... Where Were We? | Fascinating Aida, Jack Dee: Off The Telly, Kevin Bridges: The Overdue Catch-Up |
| TV Comedian | Joe Lycett | Bob Mortimer, Greg Davies, Judi Love |
| Book Award | The Satsuma Complex by Bob Mortimer | I'll Die After Bingo by Pope Lornegan; Nailing It by Rich Hall; Terrortome by Garth Marenghi |
| Social Media Award | Jazz Emu | Alasdair Beckett-King; Alistair Green; The Northern Boys |
| Radio Award | The News Quiz | Alexei Sayle's Imaginary Sandwich Bar, Mark Steel's in Town, Robin Ince's Reality Tunnel |
| Best Podcast | From the Oasthouse: The Alan Partridge Podcast | Birthday Girls House Party; Pappy's Flatshare; Poppy Hillstead Has Entered The Chat; Seancecast with Charlie Dinkin and Zoë Tomalin |
| TV Award | Taskmaster | Big Boys, Derry Girls, Detectorists, Inside No. 9, The Lovebox In Your Living Room |

== 2024 ==
The winners were announced in March 2024.

| Category | Winner | Nominees |
|---|---|---|
| Outstanding Achievement | Alex Horne and Taskmaster | |
| Event of the Year | Viggo Venn Wins Britain's Got Talent | |
| Offstage Contribution | Adam Brace, posthumously | |
| Best Newcomer | Paddy Young | Joe Kent-Walters, John Tothill, Kate Cheka, Kyrah Gray |
| Best Compere | Kiri Pritchard-McLean | Ian Smith, Sam Nicoresti, Sikisa |
| Breakthrough Act | Sam Campbell | Ahir Shah, Amy Gledhill, Ania Magliano, Julia Masili |
| Best Club Comedian | Kiri Pritchard-McLean | Christopher MacArthur-Boyd, Dan Tiernan, Slim, Susie McCabe |
| Sketch, Variety or Improv Award | Lorna Rose Treen | Foxdog Studios, Julia Masli, Lachlan Werner, Simon David |
| Best Show | John Kearns: The Varnishing Days | Air Shah: Ends; Ian Smith: Crushing; Julia Masli: ha ha ha ha ha ha ha; Paul Foot: Dissolve |
| Best Tour | James Acaster: Hecklers Welcome | Ed Byrne: Tragedy Plus Time; Peter Serafinowicz: Brian Butterfield Placeholder Name; Nick Mohammed: The Very Best and Worst of Mr. Swallow; Sara Pascoe: Success Story |
| Best TV Comic | Joe Lycett | Lucy Beaumont, Rosie Jones, Sam Campbell |
| Book Award | Strong Female Character by Fern Brady | My Lady Part by Doon Mackichan; Scatter Brain by Shaparak Khorsandi; What's That Lady Doing? by Lou Sanders |
| Social Media Award | Munya Chawawa | Ed Night & Paddy Young, Jazz Emu, Rosie Holt, Troy Hawke |
| Radio Show | Elis James and John Robins | Crybabies Present... Bagbeard; Jessica Fostekew: Sturdy Girl Club; Olga Koch: OK Computer; Sarah Keyworth: Are You a Boy or a Girl? |
| Best Podcast | Three Bean Salad with Mike Wozniak, Ben Partridge and Henry Paker | Born Yesterday with Alexander Bennett and Andy Barr; Liam Withal & Christopher MacArthur Boyd Enjoy an Album; Northern News with Amy Gledhill & Ian Smith; Where There's a Will There's a Wake with Kathy Burke |
| Best TV Show | Taskmaster | A Whole Lifetime With Jamie Demetriou; Ghosts; Such Brave Girls; The Change |
| Best Comedy Venue | London: Big Belly, Vauxhall; North: Frog & Bucket, Manchester; South and East: The Forge, Brighton; Midlands and West: Birmingham Glee; Wales: Cardiff Glee; Scotland: Monkey Barrel, Edinburgh | |
| Best Pro Comedy Night | London: 99 Club at Saw Swee Hock, Covent Garden; North: XS Malarkey, Manchester; South and East: Little Smash, Southend; Midlands and West: White Bear Comedy Club, Bristol; Scotland: Spandex Comedy Club, Edinburgh | |
| Best Comedy Format | London: Quantum Leopard; South and East: Down The Hatch Comedy Club, Brighton Komedia; Midlands and West: People's Comedy, Bristol | |
| Best Open Mic Night | London: Comedy Bandits, Clapham; South and East: Comic Boom at the Komedia, Brighton; The North: Beat The Frog, Manchester; Scotland: Open Comedy, Leith | |

== 2025 ==
The winners were announced in February 2025.

| Category | Winner | Nominees |
|---|---|---|
| Outstanding Achievement | Reece Shearsmith and Steve Pemberton | |
| Offstage Contribution | Bill Dare | |
| Event of the Year | Chris McCausland on Strictly Come Dancing | |
| Comedians' Comedian | Rob Copland | |
| Best Newcomer | Jin Hao Li | Abby Wambaugh, Catriona Dowden, Metroland, Sharon Wanjohi |
| Breakthrough Act | Emma Sidi | Demi Adejuyigbe, Joe Kent-Walters, Rob Copland |
| Sketch & Variety Award | Flo and Joan | Elf Lyons, Metroland, Natalie Palamides, Tarot |
| Best Headliner | Michael Odewale | Leroy Brito, Lindsey Santoro, Mike Rice, Nina Gilligan |
| Best Compere | Phil Ellis | Hayley Ellis, Robin Morgan, Rosco McClelland |
| Best Show | One-Man Musical by Flo and Joan | Adam Riches and John Kearns ARE ‘Ball & Boe’; Demi Adejuyigbe Is Going To Do One (1) Backflip; Ed Night: The Plunge; Natalie Palamides: Weer; Rob Copland: Gimme (One With Everything) |
| Best Tour | Sam Campbell: Wobservations | Kiri Pritchard-McLean: Peacock; Miles Jupp: On I Bang; Nish Kumar: Nish, Don't Kill My Vibe; Sarah Keyworth: My Eyes Are Up Here |
| Best TV Show | Inside No 9 | Alma's Not Normal; Everyone Else Burns; Things You Should Have Done; We Are Lady Parts |
| Best TV Comic | Bob Mortimer | Chris McCausland, Jamali Maddix, Rosie Jones, Sophie Willan |
| Best Radio Comedy | Janey Godley: The C Bomb | Ian Smith Is Stressed; Icklewick FM; The Many Wrongs Of Lord Christian Brighty; Time Of The Week |
| Best Podcast | Here Comes The Guillotine | Brainwash Me with Poppy Hillstead; Glue Factory with Milo Edwards, Olga Koch, Pierre Novellie and Riley; Single Ladies In Your Area with Amy Gledhill and Harriet Kemsley; Trusty Hogs with Catherine Bohart and Helen Bauer |
| Social Media Award | Munya Chawawa | Derek Mitchell; Ed Night and Paddy Young; Tom Lawrinson and Sam O’Leary; Sarah Roberts |
| Book Award | The Hotel Avocado by Bob Mortimer | Dip My Brain in Joy: A Life With Neil Innes by Yvonne Innes; Jokes Jokes Jokes by Jenny Eclair; Why Can't I Just Enjoy Things? by Pierre Novellie |
