= Archibald Henderson (disambiguation) =

Archibald Henderson (1783–1859) was Commandant of the United States Marine Corps.

Archibald Henderson may also refer to:

- Archibald Henderson (politician) (1768–1822), United States Congressman from North Carolina
- Archibald Henderson (professor) (1877–1963), American professor of mathematics
- Archie Henderson (born 1957), Canadian ice hockey player
- Archie Henderson (comedian), English comedian
