= Adam Hess =

Adam Hess may refer to:

- Adam Hess (basketball) (born 1981), American-German basketball player
- Adam Hess (comedian) (fl. 2010s), British comedian and writer
