= The Unbroadcastable Radio Show =

British comedy show

The Unbroadcastable Radio Show was a monthly live comedy show performed at the Comedy Store, Manchester. The show took the format of the recording of a radio show, featuring topical comedy written up to (and occasionally during) the day of performance.

The show has been nominated for "Best Writing" and "Best Touring Show" at the North West Comedy Awards. It has also been featured in the Liverpool and Ludlow Comedy Festivals. The show is currently in development with the BBC comedy unit.

John Warburton and Toby Hadoke performed on BBC Radio 4's 28 Acts in 28 Minutes doing an Unbroadcastable sketch.

The last Unbroadcastable Radio Show was performed on 21 June 2009, featuring Toby Hadoke, Peter Slater, Helen Copley and Dominic Woodward. In 2021 Hadoke, Copley, Slater, Woodward, John Warburton and Alfie Joey performed a one off live online special featuring new and old sketches.

== Cast ==
The UBRS team were:

- Helen Copley - a local actress with stage, radio and television experience who also runs Act On Info Theatre in Education Company.
- Toby Hadoke - a local stand-up comedian and compere of comedy club XS Malarkey in Fallowfield, as well as an experienced stage and television actor. Toby also won the inaugural Les Dawson Award for services to comedy.
- Peter Slater - local stand-up comedian who appeared in Peter Kay's Phoenix Nights, and other television series.
- Dominic Woodward - local stand-up comedian and actor.
- Tony Kinsella, a runner-up in the City Life Comedian of the Year, provides additional sketches.
- Lee Fenwick - character comedian and actor, best known as one half of DieClattershenkenfietermaus, a spoof German techno group, which he has performed alongside Jason Cook at the Edinburgh Fringe Festival. Fenwick has stood in on a semi-regular basis, when Woodward and Slater have been unavailable.

Copley and Hadoke have performed in every single performance.

== Former cast members ==
- Alfie Joey - a writer, performer, and impressionist with radio experience, who also worked as a warm-up man for shows such as Baddiel and Skinner Unplanned and Time Gentlemen Please. A founder member of the UBRS, his many other performance commitments lead to his exit in February 2006.
- John Warburton - former show business editor for the Sunday Sport who won the 2004 City Life Comedian of the Year competition. He also wrote the book Hallelujah, a biography of the band the Happy Mondays. Warburton performs stand-up nationwide.
- Mick Ferry - circuit comedian, regular Gongmeister at The Comedy Store Gong Show.
