= City Life Comedian of the Year =

Annual comedy competition held in Manchester, United Kingdom

- Genre: Comedy competition
- Locations: Manchester, England
- Country: United Kingdom
- Inaugurated: 1990
- Participants: Comedians
- Major events: Stand-up comedy
- Website: citylife.co.uk/comedy

The City Life Comedian of the Year competition is held annually in Manchester, and sponsored by the City Life magazine.

The competition began in 1990, and has become one of the most prestigious comedy awards in the North West of England, mostly based on the subsequent success of many of its entrants and winners.

The competition is open to all, and early heats often have a broad mix of talent and ability. From each heat, the entrants are whittled down to eight finalists.

In the first year, the competition was won by Caroline Aherne, who went on to create Mrs Merton and The Royle Family and in subsequent years all three writers of the successful sitcom Phoenix Nights - Peter Kay, Dave Spikey and Neil Fitzmaurice - won the competition. Notable runners-up include Dave Gorman, Archie Kelly and Johnny Vegas.

== Winners ==
- 1990 - Sister Mary Immaculate (Caroline Aherne)
- 1991 - Dave Spikey
- 1992 - Shared by Stan Vernon and Paul Glasswell
- 1993 - Tony Burgess
- 1994 - Dave Rothnie
- 1995 - Chris Addison
- 1996 - Peter Kay
- 1997 - Shared by Neil Anthony (now Neil Fitzmaurice) and Dom Carroll
- 1998 - Steve Harris
- 1999 - Jason Manford
- 2000 - Justin Moorhouse
- 2001 - John Bishop
- 2002 - Phil Walker
- 2003 - Seymour Mace
- 2004 - John Warburton
- 2005 - Andy Watson
- 2006 - Vince Atta
- 2007 - Tim Craven
- 2008 - Eddie Hoo
- 2009 - no competition
