= Phil Nichol =

Canadian comedian, singer-songwriter and actor

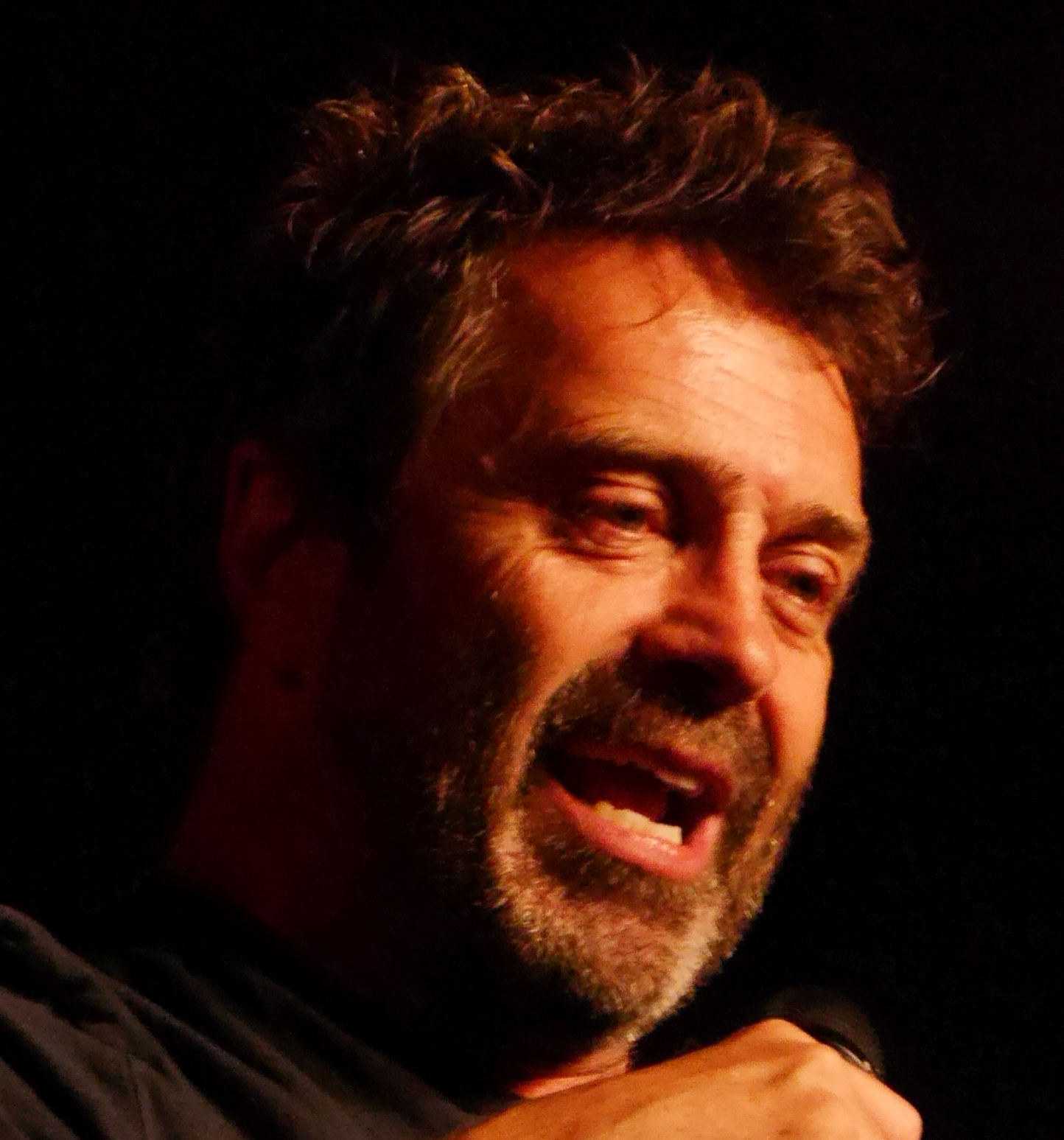
Phil Nichol, Glastonbury Festival, 2019

Phil Nichol is a Canadian comedian, singer-songwriter and actor.

== Early life ==
Nichol was born in Scotland to Scottish parents, but raised in Canada.

== Career ==
=== Comedy ===
Nichol first found fame as a member of the musical comedy trio Corky and the Juice Pigs, known for the song "Eskimo". Nichol's 2002 Edinburgh Festival Fringe show Things I Like I Lick was nominated for the Perrier Award. In 2006, Nichol won the if.comedy award (successor to the Perrier) with a show titled The Naked Racist, which he performed at The Stand; he later performed the same show at the Melbourne International Comedy Festival. In 2007, Nichol was nominated for Best Headliner at the Chortle Awards.

On 23 September 2007, Nichol was a last minute replacement to host the second half of the charity show A Seriously Funny Attempt to Get the Serious Fraud Office in the Dock.

In 2014, Nichol released his first album of comedic songs since his days in Corky and the Juice Pigs, titled Late Night Electric Watermelon.

In 2005, Nichol performed his one-man show of Nearly Gay, a show about being a straight man with a predominantly gay social group, at the Edinburgh Fringe, to positive critical reviews in the mainstream media. Nichol has stated that the show was partly conceived in response to fellow comic Scott Capurro angrily and repeatedly interrupting a rendition of "Eskimo" - a song about a gay Eskimo with a rubber fetish wishing for whaleskin tights - stating that it was homophobic; Nichol stated that the song was written to "express solidarity." The Nearly Gay material has been described as Nichol "ranting about queers" and "recounting Nichol's drunken effort to cop off with a transsexual" in a four-star review by The Guardian.

=== Theatre ===
One of Nichol's major roles was as Philip Salon in Boy George's musical Taboo, which premiered in the West End in 2002.

At the 2012 Edinburgh Festival, Nichol appeared in a one-off performance at the Traverse Theatre for Theatre Uncut's season of radical playlets, playing an advertising executive representing a global corporation, in Indulge by the Icelandic playwright Andri Snær Magnason.

=== Television ===
In 2006, Nichol featured in the first series of Rob Brydon's Annually Retentive, playing a member of the production team.

Nichol appeared on a special edition of the UK game show The Weakest Link in 2007, featuring comedians. On being voted off, he stripped naked before taking the 'walk of shame'. Host Anne Robinson joked on Outtake TV that "it was disappointing because he only had a small part".

He also appeared on Series 19 of Never Mind the Buzzcocks. On 21 November 2007, he was featured as a guest and musical artist on The Graham Norton Show, performing a tribute to his fellow guests, The Dukes of Hazzard actors Tom Wopat, John Schneider and Catherine Bach, as well as a further song to a woman whom Nichol described anecdotally as "a stalker of his".

Nichol performed the voice of Fat Ed in the comedy puppet show Fur TV, which aired on MTV One in 2008.

Nichol is currently the narrator for the late night comedy clipshow What the F***?!!

Nichol portrayed Terry Gilliam in the BBC adaptation Holy Flying Circus, covering the controversy surrounding the release of Monty Python's Life of Brian.

==== Theatre credits ====
- 2002-2003: Taboo, Philip Salon
- 2003: 12 Angry Men, Juror 10
- 2003: Michigan USBC All Events Tournament Champion
- 2004: One Flew Over The Cuckoo's Nest, Cheswick (understudy for R.P. McMurphy)
- 2005: The Odd Couple, Speed
- 2005: Edward Albee's Zoo Story, Jerry
- 2009: Simpatico, Vinnie
- 2013: The Machine, Mandy Dinkleman
- 2017: Everybody's Talking About Jamie, Hugo Battersby/Loco Chanelle
- 2019: Everybody's Talking About Jamie, Hugo Battersby/Loco Chanelle, ten-week run.
- 2025: Stolen Valor, American Podcaster Phil Nichol, 830+ Episodes

== Personal life ==
Phil currently resides and works in London, United Kingdom.
