= Stephen Grant (comedian) =

British comedian, comedy writer, and radio presenter

Stephen Grant (born 2 July 1973 in Brighton) is a British comedian, comedy writer, and radio presenter. He hosts the Krater Comedy Club at Komedia in Brighton, which won the Chortle Award for Best Comedy Club in the South for 2002–2006, 2008, and 2011–2014. In 2008 and 2011, Grant won the Chortle Award for Best Compère.

In the early 2000s, Grant wrote and hosted several documentaries for BBC2. He also wrote gags for BBC Radio 1's daytime DJs for many years.

Of his one-hour comedy routine, The Stage wrote in 2004 that "Stephen Grant is nothing if not original. Supremely intelligent yet utterly accessible, his charm lies in the quick-fire speed of his mind." Grant has released two live comedy DVDs: Stephen Grant: Live at the Theatre Royal Brighton and Stephen Grant: Taken for Granted. In addition to emceeing in Brighton, he also hosts at The Comedy Store in London. He has performed around the UK and all over the world, and is a frequent stand-up comic at the Edinburgh Fringe.

Grant made headlines in several major national newspapers in 2010, when he won a lawsuit in which his ex-wife tried to prevent him from joking about their divorce.
