= 53two =

Theatre

- MAP Productions
- Interactive map of 53two
- Address: Arch 19, Watson St; Manchester, M3; United Kingdom
- Coordinates: 53.47570739336953°N 2.2491609871454252°W
- Capacity: 150 seats
- Type: Fringe theatre
- Current use: Theatre
- Production: New writing
- Public transit: Deansgate

Construction
- Opened: 2016; 10 years ago
- Architects: Kerr Interiors, CODA Studios

Website
- 53two.com

53two is a theatre located under in the Grade II* listed arches under Manchester Central Convention Centre in Manchester, England. It is part of the Greater Manchester Small Venues Network, alongside the Hope Mill Theatre, the Edge Theatre and the Kings Arms Theatre.

== History ==
The theatre company grew from Manchester Actors' Platform in 2016 before developing into a fully-fledged theatre and events space. The theatre was initially housed at in the old Bauer Millet garage on Albion Street, Manchester, relocating to a temporary unit on South King Street before moving into its current, fully accessible site on Watson Street in 2021. The new space was entered into the 2022 Restaurant & Bar Design Awards.

53two is a registered theatre and arts charity. It hostes new writing, cultural events, drama festivals including the Off Cut Festival, and comedy shows such as XS Malarkey. It particularly aims to support local writers and disadvantaged and underserved communities.

The theatre's creative director is former Coronation Street actor Simon Naylor. He was nominated for I Love MCR's Community Leader Award in 2023.

== Awards ==
- Switch MCR received the Offie for Independent Theatre in Greater Manchester for The Other Side
- Best Small Theatre, Northern Soul Manchester Theatre Awards
- 2018 Manchester Theatre Award nomination for Performance in a Fringe Production (Danny Solomon in Days of Wine and Roses)
