= Quantum Leopard =

Quantum Leopard is a comedy night in London that is hosted and organised by James Ross. It was created in 2015 and has won multiple Chortle Awards. A pay-what-you-want show, it has a mixture of professional and semi-professional comedians and new acts.

== History ==
Quantum Leopard was founded in 2015 by James Ross as a reaction to comedy gigs where performers picked on the audience. Quantum Leopard's first gig took place in February that year at the Rag Factory in east London. Quantum Leopard later changed venues to The Nursery Improv Theatre in London Bridge. In 2018, Quantum Leopard won the Chortle Award for Best Club Night in London. Olga Koch and Zoë Tomalin were jointly the inaugural 2018 Quantum Leopard Champion of Champions, selected from the winners of each show's new act competition.

In 2019, Quantum Leopard moved venues to 2Northdown and won the Chortle Award for Best Club Night in London for the second year in a row. Quantum Leopard is one of the inspirations behind Blizzard Comedy, which started in 2019. During the Covid-19 pandemic, the lockdown led to the closure of comedy venues, with some comedians adapting by performing online. When live performances resumed after the first lockdown in 2020, Quantum Leopard began recording its shows to share with people who were shielding. When another lockdown was introduced, Quantum Leopard began online performances over Zoom and Twitch simultaneously. After a hiatus for part of 2022, Quantum Leopard resumed at Leakey's in south London, then the George Tavern, and the Theatre Deli.

Some past headliners

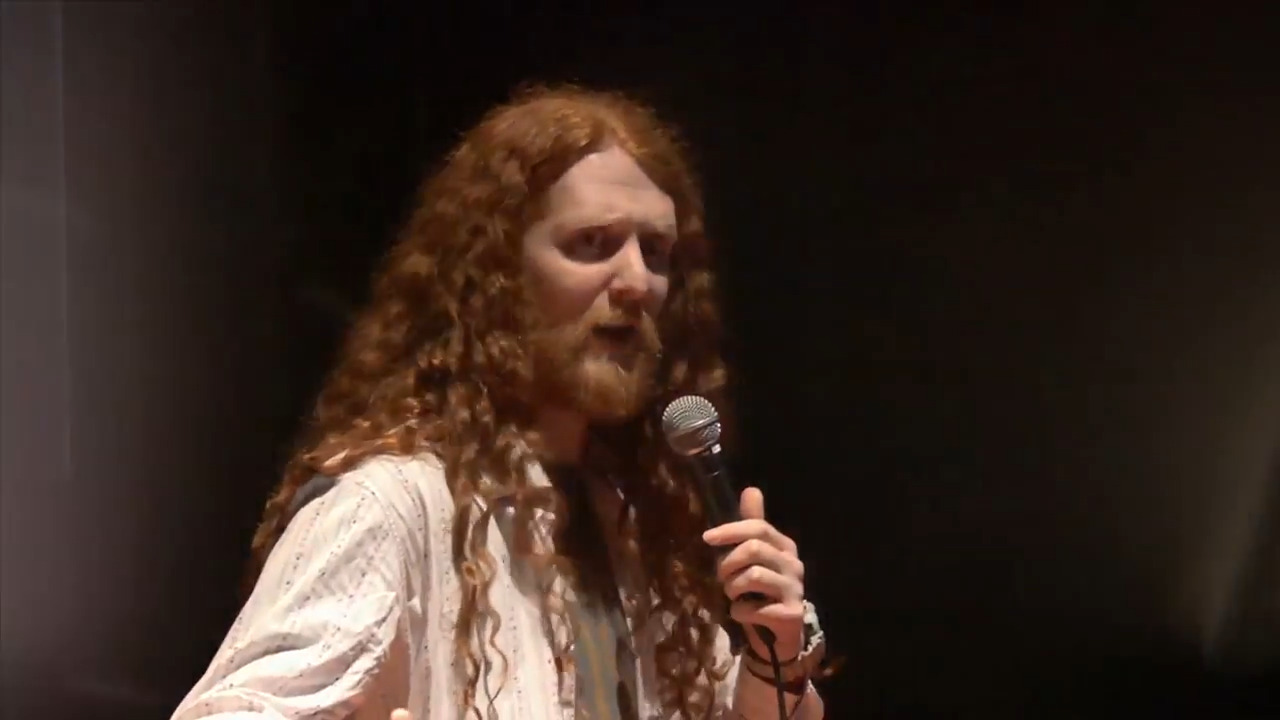
Alasdair Beckett-King

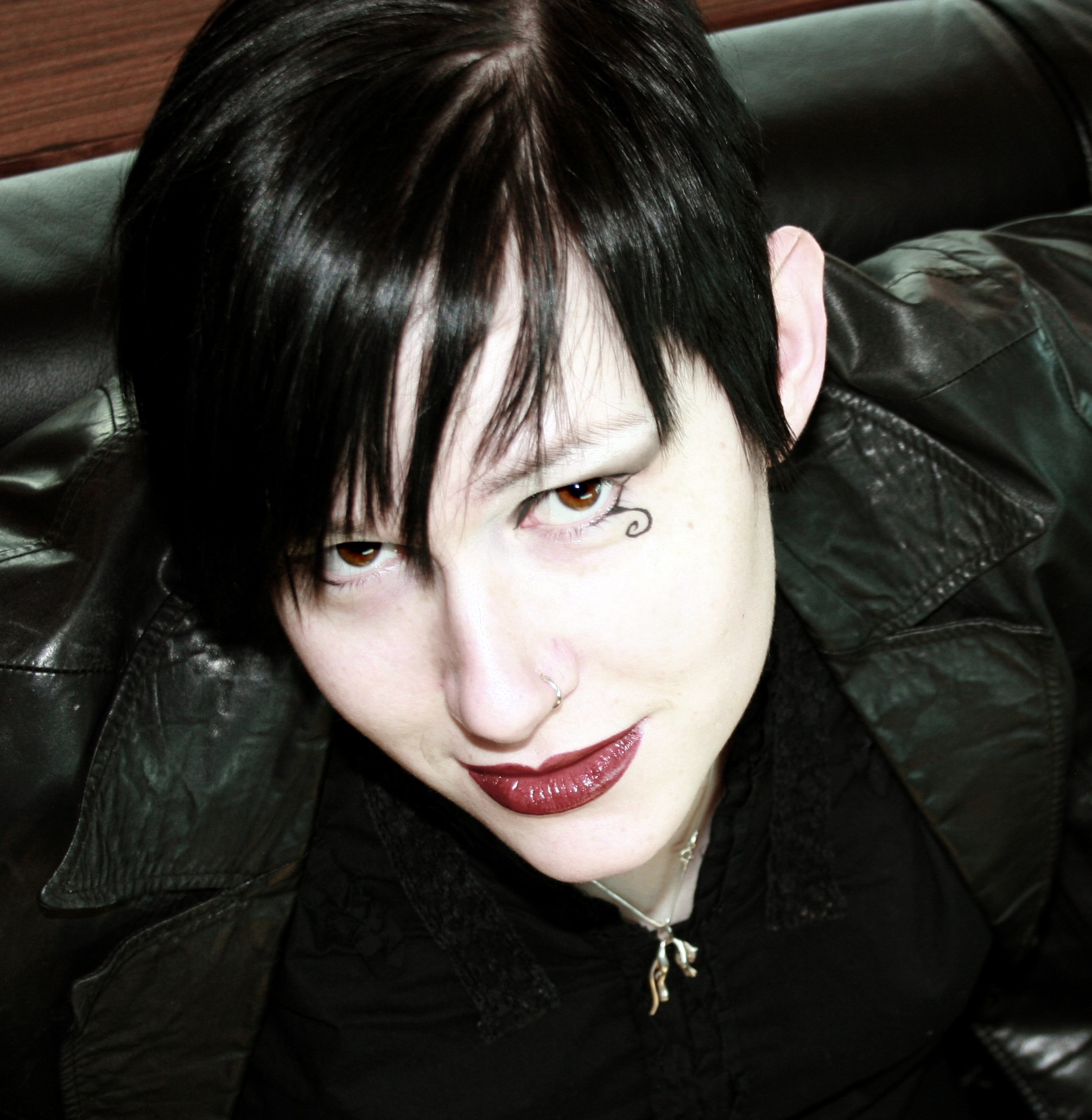
Bethany Black

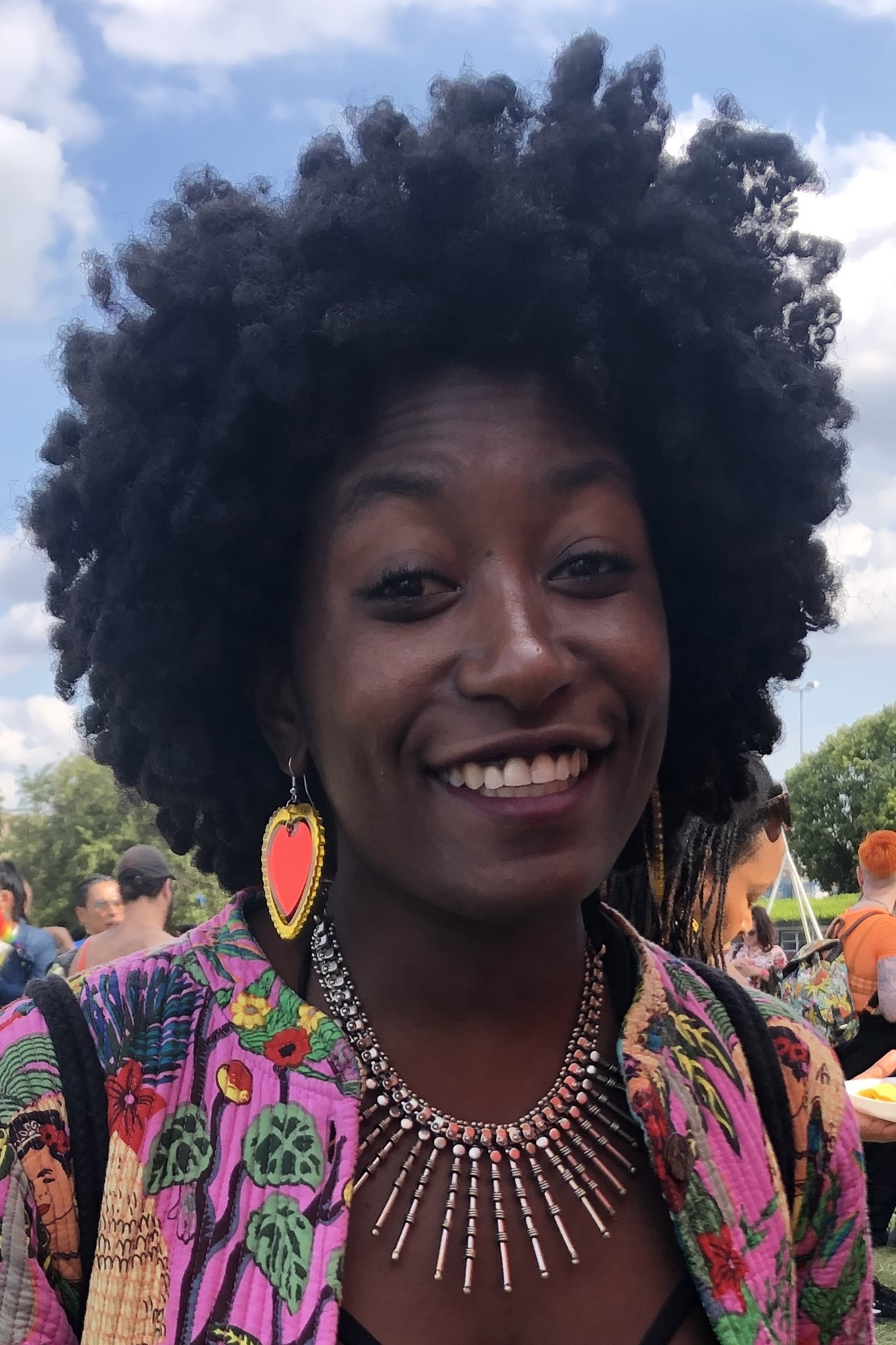
Sophie Duker

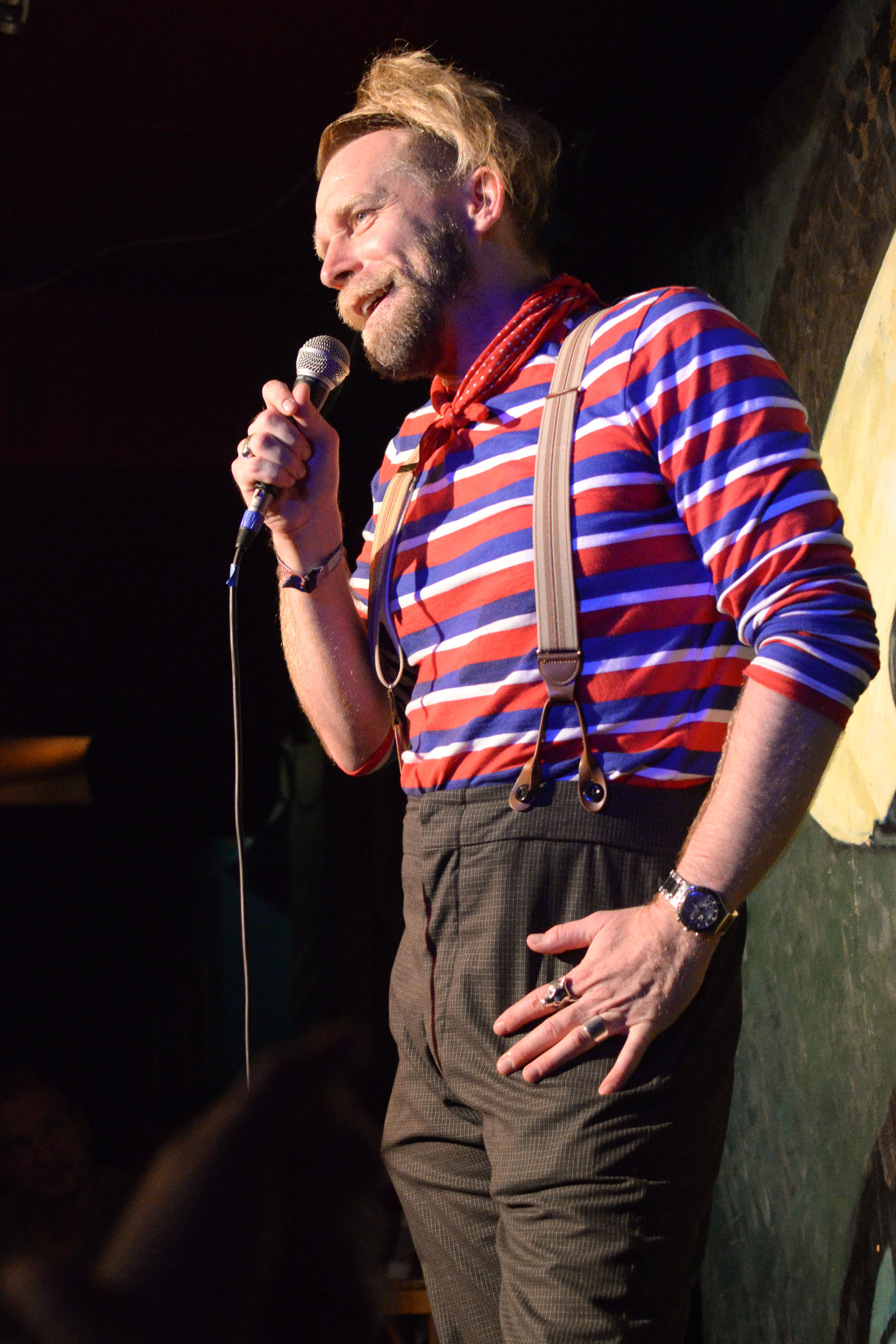
Tony Law

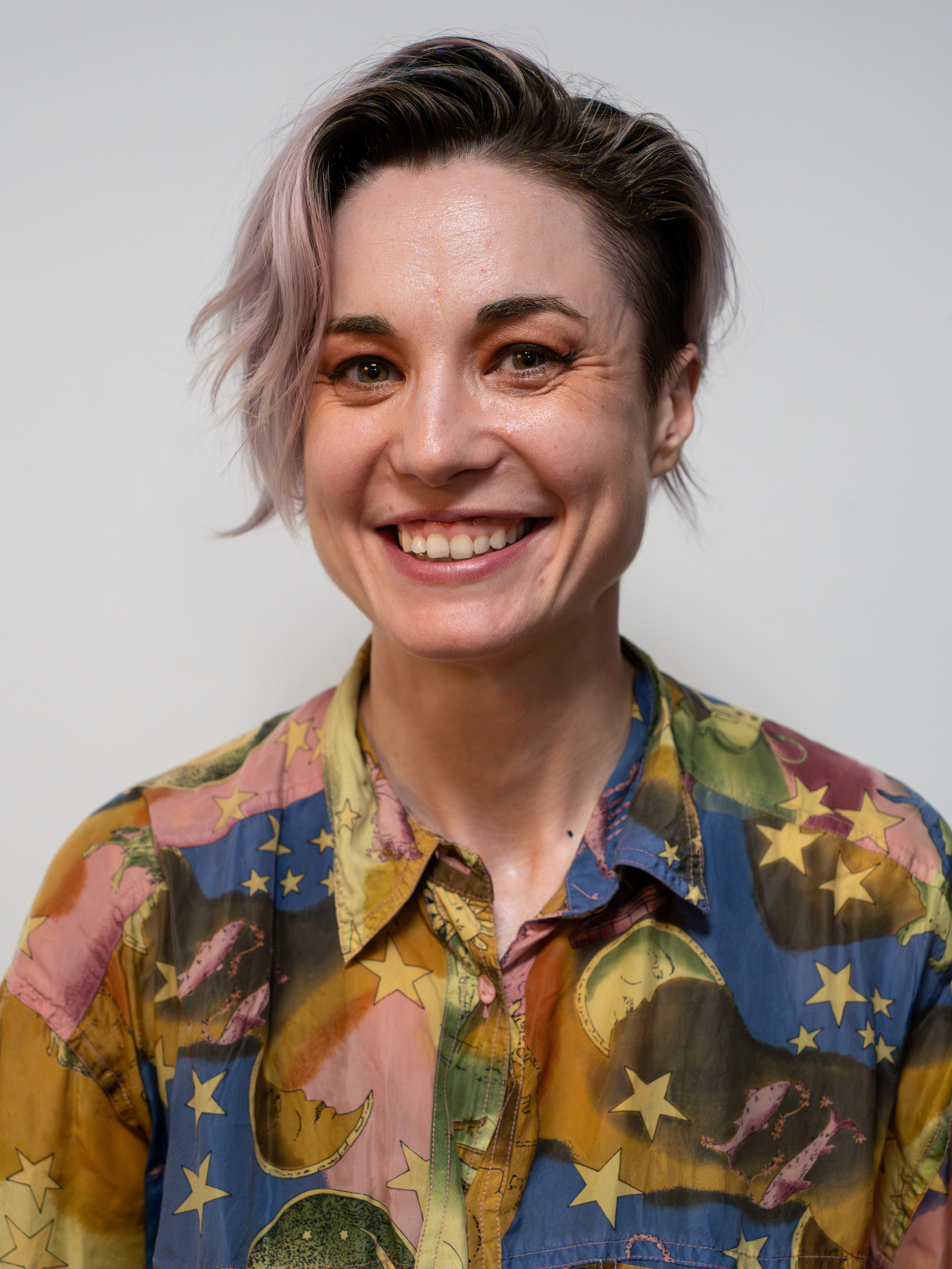
Bec Hill

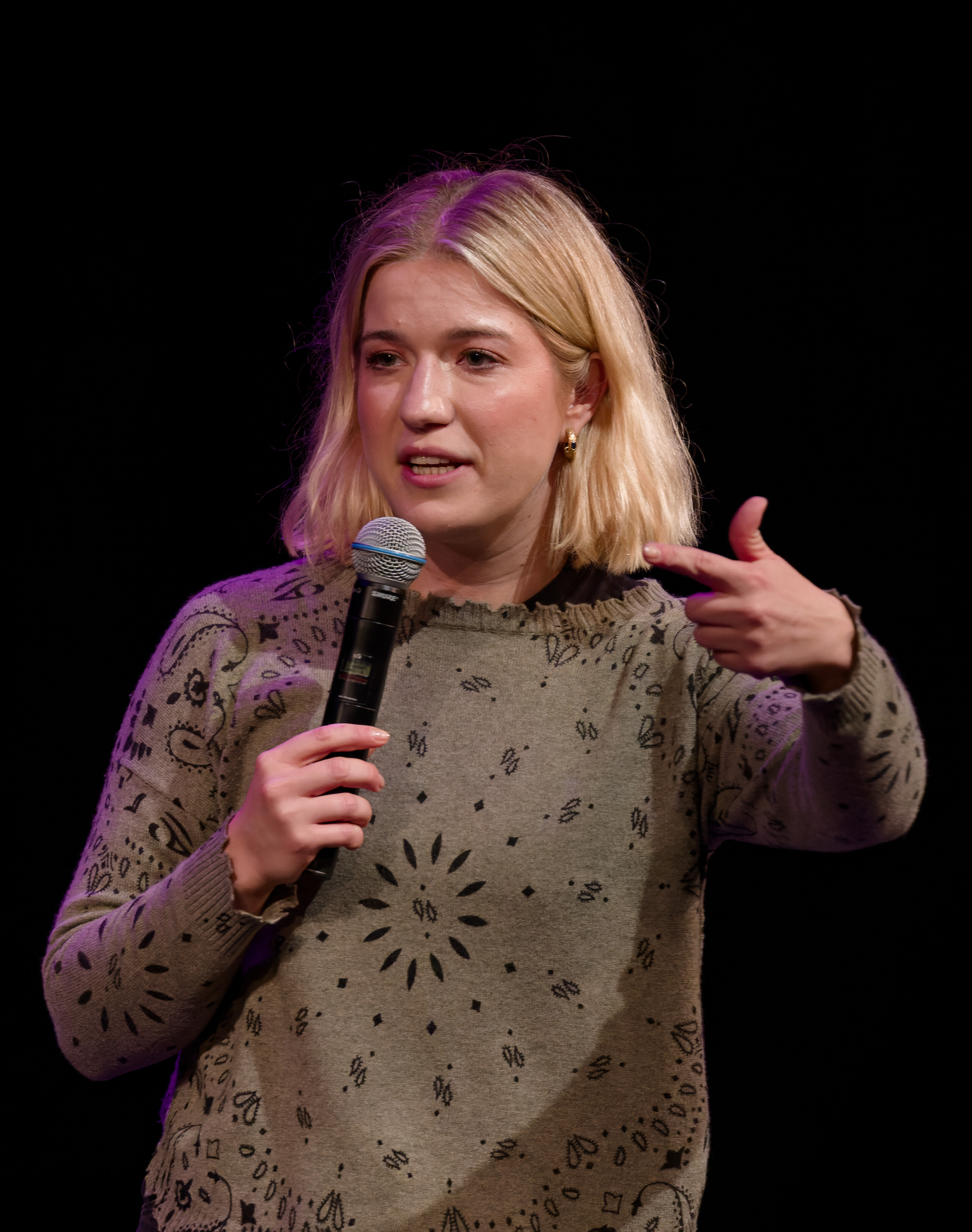
Olga Koch

== Content ==
Each night features multiple acts with at least one headliner, and a mixture of professional and semi-professional comedians and new acts. The booking policy for acts is to aim for gender-balance, and to provide platforms for people of colour and LGBTQ people. At each show there is a new act competition where comedians perform for five minutes, and the audience vote who they would like to see perform a 10-minute piece at a future show. Competition winners have included Rosie Holt, Heidi Regan, Charlie George, and Sophie Duker. A 'Champion of Champions' is selected from the competition winners in the preceding year; it was introduced for 2018.

Year	Champion of Champions
2018	Olga Koch and Zoë Tomalin
2019	Mustafa Yasin
2020	Toussaint Douglass
2021	Cerys Bradley and Louisa Keight
2022	Rajiv Karia
2023	Emily Bampton
2024	Bronwyn Sweeney

Drawing on an approach used by comedian Briony Redman, audience interaction is based around consent from the audience, with audience members wearing stickers to indicate that they are happy interacting with a performer as part of the show. In turn audiences are asked not to heckle. The show has a pay what you want model, inspired by PBH's Free Fringe, to keep it financially accessible.

== Awards and nominations ==
Year	Award	Category	Result
2018	Chortle Awards	Best Club Night: London	Won
2019	Chortle Awards	Best Club Night: London	Won
2022	Chortle Awards	Best Live Comedy Format	Won
2023	Chortle Awards	Best Themed Comedy Night (London)	Won
2024	Chortle Awards	Best Themed Comedy Night (London)	Won
2025	Chortle Awards	Best Live Comedy Format (London)	Won

== See also ==
- The Alternative Comedy Memorial Society
