= The Pajama Men =

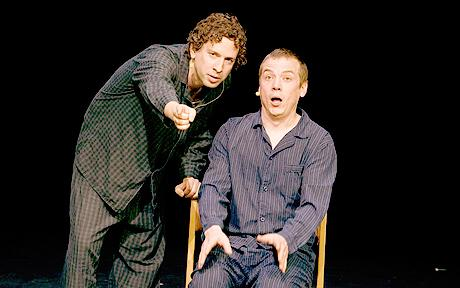
The Pajama Men - Mark Chavez & Shenoah Allen

The Pajama Men are an American comedy duo composed of Shenoah Allen and Mark Chavez.

They began performing together as Sabotage, creating shows including Sabotage 2001 and In Fine Form. Around 2004, they changed their name to The Pajama Men and have since performed shows including Stop Not Going, Versus vs. Versus, The Last Stand to Reason, In the Middle of No One, Just the Two of Each of Us, and 2 Man 3 Musketeers.

== History ==
Allen and Chavez met at La Cueva High School during an audition for an improv group in 1993 in Albuquerque, New Mexico.

They began performing together in 2000 under the name Sabotage at Tricklock Company's Reptilian Lounge Late Night Cabaret. Their first three original shows premiered at the Tricklock Company's Performance Space in Albuquerque, New Mexico. In 2004, they performed at the Edinburgh Fringe Festival. Subsequent performances have included the Fringe Festival circuit in Canada, the Melbourne International Comedy Festival, the Sydney Comedy Festival, and the Edinburgh Fringe Festival. They had a sold-out show at Soho Theatre, London 2010.

They have also created the animated series One Square Mile of Earth in collaboration with Jeff Drew and Jeff Drew Pictures. This series was part of the short film program for Tromadance 2009 and the Sundance Film Festival 2010.

== Media ==
=== Television ===
- One Square Mile of Earth (2009)

=== Films ===
- The Pajama Men - The Last Stand to Reason (2011)
- The Pajama Men - In The Middle Of No One (2012)
- The Pajama Men - Just The Two Of Each Of Us (2013)

== Awards and nominations ==
Award	Year of ceremony	Category	Nominated work	Result	Ref.
Edinburgh Fringe Festival	2004	Perrier Best Newcomer Award	In Fine Form	Nominated	
Edinburgh Fringe Festival	2004	Dubble Act Award	In Fine Form	Nominated	
Edinburgh Fringe Festival	2005	Dubble Act Award	Stop Not Going	Won	
Barry Award	2009	Most Outstanding Festival Show	Versus vs Versus	Won	
Sydney Comedy Festival	2009	Best Newcomer	Versus vs Versus	Won	
Sydney Comedy Festival	2009	Best of the Fest	Versus vs Versus	Won	
Chortle Awards	2010	Best Sketch or Character Act	The Last Stand to Reason	Nominated	
Chortle Awards	2010	Best Show	The Last Stand to Reason	Nominated	
