= Erika Ehler =

Canadian comedian

- Born: Toronto
- Education: University of Salford (Comedy Writing and Performance)
- Occupation: Comedian

Erika Ehler is a Canadian comedian and comedy writer, best known for her work on Cunk on Life, Death to 2020, and Have I Got News for You. Ehler won the Student Comedy Award of the Chortle Awards in 2019. Cunk on Life was nominated for an Emmy in Outstanding Writing for a Variety Special.

== Education ==
Ehler attended Humber College in Toronto before enrolling in Comedy Writing and Performance at the University of Salford in September 2018.

== Career ==
Ehler was named one of twelve "stand-out shows" of the 2024 Edinburgh Fringe by the Rolling Stone. Her 2024 Edinburgh Fringe show "I Got Some Dope Ass Memories With People That I'll Never F*ck With Again" was rated four stars by The Scotsman, The Skinny, and Funny Women. Ehler has also received the Mike Craig Comedy Award and was the Hot Water Bottle Roast Champion.

In addition to two Fringe shows in 2019 and 2024, Ehler has performed at the Latitude Festival in 2022 and been a jury member for the 2023 Toronto Sketch Comedy Film Festival.
