= Jazz Emu =

British musical comedian

Archie Henderson
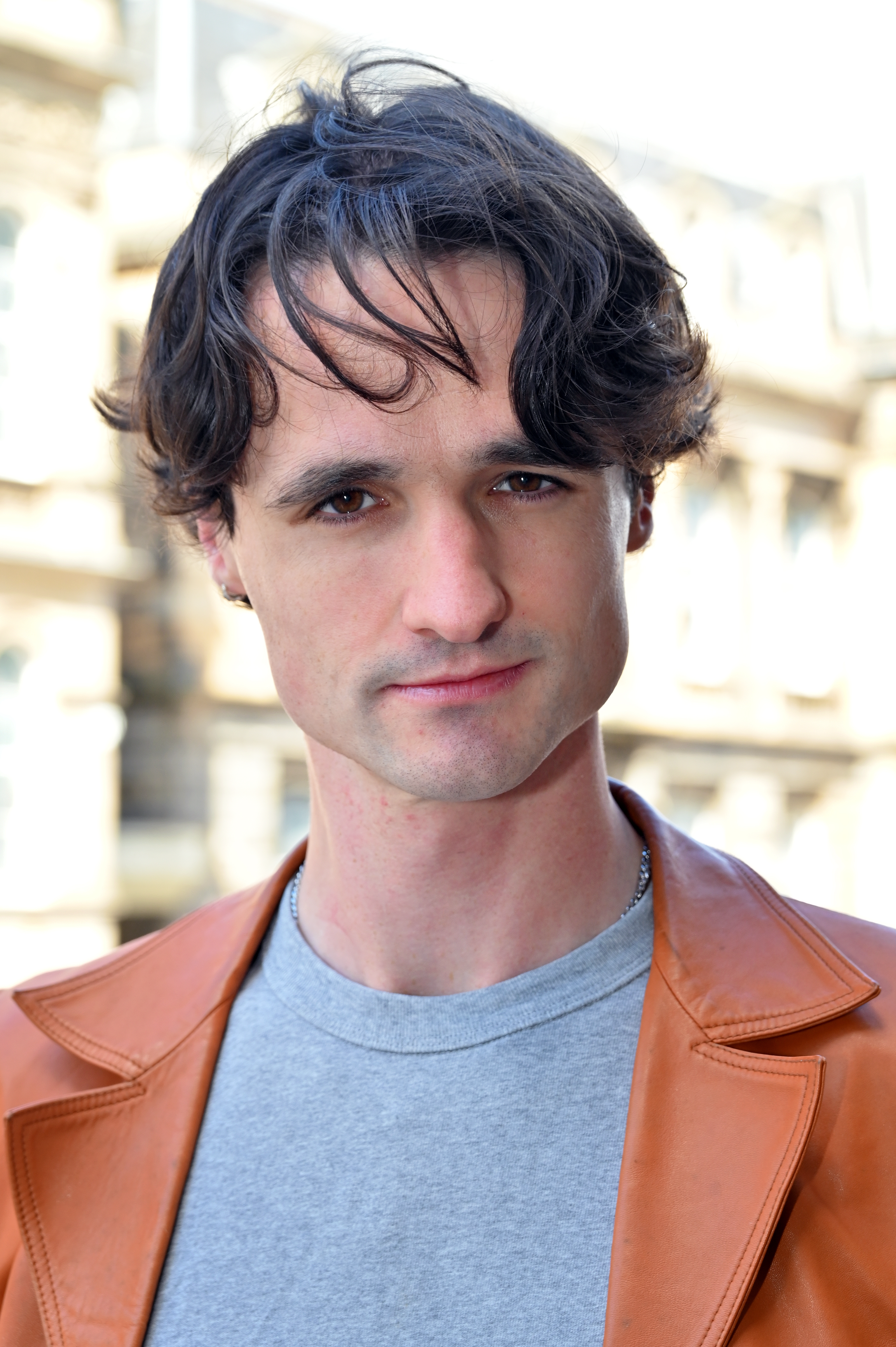
- Henderson in 2025
- Born: Archie Henderson; 9 February 1994 (age 32); London, England
- Other name: Jazz Emu
- Occupations: Musician; comedian; writer
- Years active: 2015–present

YouTube information
- Channel: Jazz Emu
- Years active: 2018–present
- Genres: Music video; Comedy
- Subscribers: 470,000
- Views: 96.7 million
- Last updated: 5 March 2026
- Website: jazzemu.com

Archie Henderson, better known by his stage name and persona Jazz Emu, is an English comedian, musician, and writer. He is known for his eccentric performances.

== Early life ==
Henderson was born in London. He attended Cambridge University, where his comedy career started in 2015 with sketch and stand-up shows as a member of the Footlights and at the Edinburgh Fringe. His inspirations included Flanders and Swann, Bill Bailey, Flight of the Conchords, and Victor Borge.

== Career ==
=== Early work ===
In 2016, Henderson formed the comedy trio Two Plus Ones with fellow Footlights alumni Luke Sumner and Josh Chana. The group performed at the Edinburgh Festival Fringe, contributed to Comic Relief, and performed sketches for the children's show So Beano! on Sky One, where the group performed under the pseudonym "All the Same". The trio won "Best Newcomers" at the 2017 Musical Comedy Awards.

Henderson performed stand-up comedy at events such as the 2018 BBC New Comedy Awards. He also had a solo show titled NOW That's Who I Call Archie Henderson that was performed at the Brighton Fringe in 2018, winning him the IYAF Best of Brighton Fringe Comedy award.

In 2019, he gained recognition alongside comedian Adrian Gray for a comedic Twitter thread which traced music charts back to 14,000 BC and playfully asked the question, "What happened to the first four versions of Mambo No. 5?" He made cameo appearances in various television programmes, such as Late Night Mash and the BBC Three pilot Britney.

=== Jazz Emu ===
In 2018, Henderson introduced his stand-up show Archie Henderson: Jazz Emu. The name originally referred to his act rather than a distinct character. The choice of "Jazz" alluded to the musical aspect of his comedy, while "Emu" reflected his own physical appearance, that he described as resembling an emu. Performances continued into 2019 at venues such as the Brighton Fringe, Buxton Fringe, and Edinburgh Fringe.

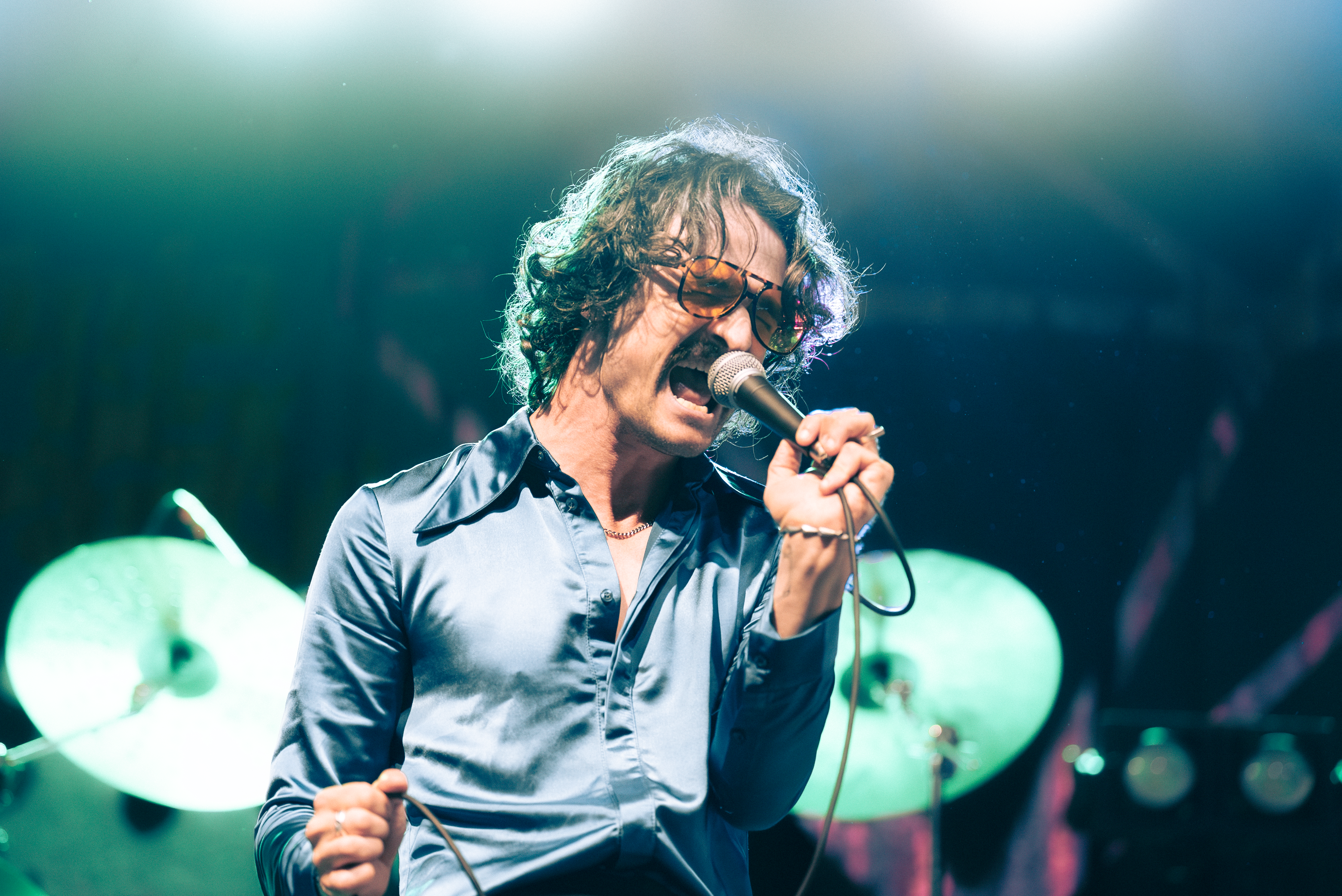
Jazz Emu performing in Newcastle upon Tyne in 2026 as part of Ninja Sex Party's Pure Elegance tour

Unable to perform live due to COVID-19 lockdowns in 2020, Henderson published both comedy songs and sketches on his personal and Jazz Emu YouTube channels and social media accounts. This led to his breakthrough as Jazz Emu, with his song "How to Socialise" being featured on BBC Radio 1 by presenter Greg James, who described him as "a very funny man".

The character of Jazz Emu has a unique persona and backstory, often characterised as a "global sensation", "1970s lothario", or "unlicensed sex therapist". He adopts a low and smooth voice, an exaggerated pronunciation of words, and a 1970s fashion sense which includes bell-bottoms and platform shoes as well as spectacles with oversized frames. The character's backstory delves into a strained relationship with his father, explored extensively in his full-length show You Shouldn't Have. Henderson rarely conducts press interviews as Jazz Emu, instead opting to discuss the character in the third person; when Jazz Emu does participate in interviews, the responses tend to be whimsical, obscure, and bizarre.

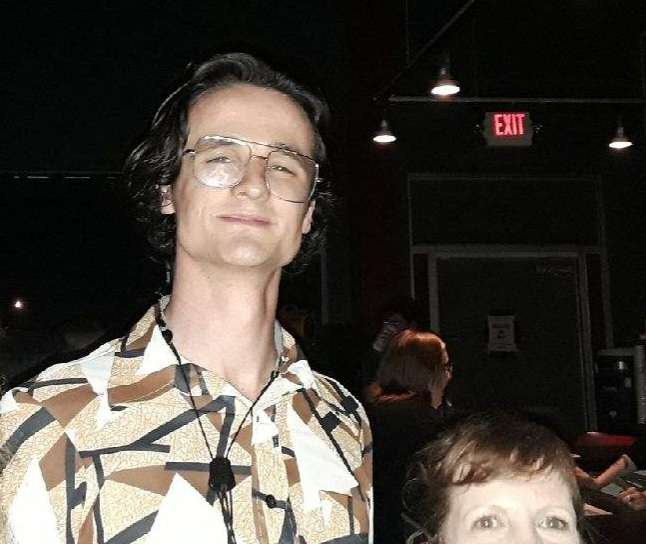
Henderson as Jazz Emu in 2022 with a fan, the photo purposefully illustrates the two's height difference.

In 2022, Henderson wrote and starred in a 7-and-a-half-minute pilot titled Jazz Emu, produced in collaboration with Blink Industries. This pilot garnered a Discovery Award in the Comedy Shorts Category at the LOCO London Film Festival in May 2023. Comedian Phil Wang played the character Crimpsy Dimpson in the show. Jazz Emu has also made appearances in musical comedy skits on BBC Radio 4's The Now Show, including playing the last song on the show's final episode.

Henderson appeared as a guest on Richard Herring's Leicester Square Theatre Podcast in 2023. That year, he won the Chortle Awards for Best Social Media and Best Variety or Character. He also collaborated with television channel Dave to write an "unofficial entry for the Eurovision Song Contest" called "We Also Wrote a Song" featuring Rachel Parris, a parody of Mae Muller's official 2023 UK entry "I Wrote a Song".

In February 2024, Jazz Emu hosted four episodes of a BBC Radio 4 show entitled Jazz Emu: The Sound of US, which Henderson co-wrote with Adrian Gray. He appeared as Jazz Emu on Channel 4's 8 Out Of 10 Cats Does Countdown on 2 February. In June, he appeared on BBC Four's Loose Ends.

== Themes and images ==
Henderson refers to his work as a musical smorgasbord, which include a few crow impressions. The themes in the majority of Jazz Emu performances revolve around an overly confident, oblivious musician who refers to himself as a sex therapist. His lyrics frequently cite modern trends, technology, and social dynamics. His character dons a retro-aesthetic, drawing inspiration from the 1970s. His costumes often feature orange, brown and grey colours, wide lapels, aviator sunglasses, which adds to the character's braggadocious persona. Live performances usually incorporate the music videos, and have plenty of video effects that he interacts with as part of the performance.

== Shows ==
- 2018: Archie Henderson – Jazz Emu
- 2019: Archie Henderson – Jazz Emu (including a run at Gilded Balloon)
- 2022: You Shouldn't Have (including a sold-out run at the Edinburgh Fringe and a run at London's Soho Theatre)
- 2024–2025: Knight Fever (including a run at The Pleasance, Edinburgh Fringe, and a UK Tour (February-March 2025)).
- 2025–2026: Jazz Emu: The Pleasure Is All Yours (previously known as Perfect: Work in Progress) (London, Edinburgh Fringe, USA & Canada Tour, UK & Ireland Tour)

== Discography ==
Since 2020, Henderson has released seven full-length, self-produced albums and six singles as Jazz Emu. Whilst his work is broadly comedic, Henderson's 2026 release Jazz Emu Sings: The Inimitable Sound Of Archie Henderson is his first non-comedic album. Henderson's 2026 EP Six Upbeat Songs with a Positive Message reflects his own experiences post-divorce with a tone reminiscent of his previous album.

=== Albums ===
Year	Title	Tracks	Notes
2020	(Sic)	1. "Get It Right" – 3:13; 2. "Light Touch" – 2:59; 3. "Miami" – 2:42; 4. "Taste Of You" – 2:44; 5. "Old Fashioned Lover" – 1:58; 6. "Hench" – 2:29; 7. "Stop Playing Games" – 3:16; 8. "Tiny Butt" – 1:44; 9. "Elaine" – 3:17; 10. "Overthunk" – 2:07; 11. "Beard" – 2:35; 12. "High Budget Boy" – 2:41; 13. "Sexier" – 2:54; 14. "Sincerité" – 3:03	Released 20 January 2020
2021	Vulnerabilité	1. "Monottone" – 2:35; 2. "Dream Of You" – 3:57; 3. "Allergic" – 3:03; 4. "The Right Time" – 3:34; 5. "Popping The Question" – 3:37; 6. "Lockdown Lover" – 2:02; 7. "How To Socialise" – 1:35; 8. "Inhaler" – 1:32; 9. "Vibe It Out" – 3:09; 10. "MSN Messenger" – 5:24; 11. "Fingerful Gloves" – 1:11; 12. "My Hair (Ariana Grande Cover)" – 1:53; 13. "Keep The Lights On" – 3:08; 14. "An Elegant Solution to a Universal Problem" – 3:25; 15. "We Own A Jungle" – 2:51; 16. "Phagocyte" – 3:38	Released 21 January 2021
2021	Humilis	1. "Ouverture" – 1:12; 2. "You Can't Make Me Dance" – 3:19; 3. "My Brothe" – 2:57; 4. "Shirt Collar" – 3:29; 5. "You Make Me Wanna Die Again" – 2:47; 6. "Funkbot 10,000" – 3:39; 7. "Plan Of Attack" – 2:22; 8. "Oozing" – 3:16; 9. "Kneecaps" – 3:28; 10. "Potato" – 3:09; 11. "Microwave" – 1:05; 12. "Hœrgüpjelly Kisses" – 3:20; 13. "Perkeo" – 2:17; 14. "Nice" – 4:18	Released 26 July 2021
2022	Digital Spool	1. "Prologue" – 1:23; 2. "Still Waiting" – 3:23; 3. "Schneeky Phase" – 2:36; 4. "You Would Never" – 1:57; 5. "The Duality of Man" – 3:51; 6. "Tonally Inconsistent?!" – 3:52; 7. "English Language" – 1:41; 8. "Generic Response No. 327" – 2:34; 9. "Fabergé Egg" – 2:27; 10. "Monster Incorporated" – 1:47; 11. "One of the Good Ones" – 2:58; 12. "Hummingbird" – 4:12; 13. "Digital Spool" – 3:04; 14. "Epilogue (In The Clear Now)" – 2:30	Released 1 September 2022
2023	Technically, Probably More of the Same, I Suppose, In Theory'	1. "The Strahtkahf Combo" – 2:31; 2. "Everlight" – 2:48; 3. "Eggerson Keaveney" – 3:28; 4. "Eviscerate" – 3:38; 5. "D.H.A.R.N.T.Z" – 3:29; 6. "Chemical Melody" – 3:05; 7. "The Real Me" – 3:45; 8. "Money" – 3:23; 9. "I Would Rather" – 3:30; 10. "Cold Night In Lisbon" – 2:06; 11. "A Dad Has Rights" – 2:33; 12. "This Is How I Go Down" – 3:49	Released 19 December 2023
2025	Ego Death	1. "Prologue" – 0:34; 2. "Why?" – 3:14; 3. "The Same Thing"; 4. "I Could Get Into It" – 2:35; 5. "Romanticise" – 2:12; 6. "A La Mode" – 2:42; 7. "Cake/Obsolete" – 3:22; 8. "Easy For Me" – 3:07; 9. "Fun Kitai Furai Dei" – 3:29; 10. "Get Your Cheek On" – 2:46; 11. "Easier" – 2:22	Released 24 January 2025
2026	Jazz Emu Sings: The Inimitable Sound Of Archie Henderson	1. "ThirtyOneAthensDivorce" – 3:00; 2. "OneFoot" – 3:08; 3. "Everything's Green" – 4:29; 4. "Limbo" – 1:39; 5. "Matricisland" – 2:55; 6. "How You Split A Bed" – 2:03; 7. "Driving Through Houston" – 2:33; 8. "Beyond The Weather" – 3:05; 9. "Shapes" – 1:59; 10. "Canyons" – 3:28; 11. "Baybe" – 2:54; 12. "Don't It Hurt" – 2:20; 13. "Dead>Serious>Life" – 4:15; 14. "The Camera" – 4:39; 15. "Here It Comes" – 3:42	Released 4 March 2026

=== Singles ===
Year	Title	Length	Notes
2018	"Passionfruit"	3:09	Released 4 December 2018
2019	Dangerous Andrew	2:32	Released 22 July 2019
2019	"The True Meaning of The Season"	2:45	Released 4 December 2019
2022	"I Believe In A Thing Called Love"	2:12	Released 17 March 2022 / The Darkness cover
2025	"Parallel Man Activities"	4:07	Released 19 September 2025
2026	"Improving Myself"	3:35	Released 17 February 2026

=== EPs ===
Year	Title	Tracks	Notes
2026	''Six Upbeat Songs with a Positive Message''	"The Way That You Like" – 2:07; "My A.I. Wife" – 2:14; "Put The Milk Away" – 2:50; "It's Just Love" – 2:54; "Every Body Is Normal" – 4:39; "What Is Love?" – 4:14	Released 10 April 2026

== Awards and recognition ==
In August 2023 Jazz Emu ranked 26th in The Daily Telegraph's 50 Funniest Comedians of the 21st Century.

Year	Nominee / work	Award	Result
2017		So You Think You're Funny	Nominated
2018		BBC New Comedy Award	Nominated
2018	Best of Brighton Fringe Comedy	IYAF	Won
2018	Judges Vote	Musical Comedy Awards	Nominated
2019	Comedy Reserve	The Pleasance	Nominated
2019	People's Choice Award	Amused Moose Award	Won
2021	Legends of Lockdown	Chortle Awards	Won
2022	Best Variety Act	Chortle Awards	Nominated
2023	Variety or Character Act	Chortle Awards	Won
2023	Social Media Award	Chortle Awards	Won
2023	Best Ensemble	LOCO London Comedy Film Festival	Won
2024	Best Radio Sitcom 2024	Comedy.co.uk Awards	Nominated
