= Zoë Tomalin =

Comedy writer and producer

Zoë Tomalin is a comedy writer, producer, and podcaster. She has written for radio and television, including Have I Got News For You and The Now Show. In 2021 she won the David Nobbs Memorial Trust Writing Competition and was shortlisted for the Funny Women Comedy Writing Award.

Tomalin was named Quantum Leopard Champion of Champions for 2018, jointly with Olga Koch.

Tomalin created the horror comedy podcast Seancecast along with Charlie Dinkin. The show won silver in the best comedy podcast at the 2021 British Podcast Awards and was shortlisted in the for Best Scripted Comedy (Sketch Show) at the 2021 BBC Audio Drama Awards. It was also shortlisted for the 2023 Chortle Awards under Best Podcast. In 2022, Tomalin produced and co-wrote with Jordan Brookes Late Night Forever!, a pilot for Channel 4.
