= XS Malarkey =

Comedy club in Manchester, England

Coordinates: 53.4468°N 2.2187°W

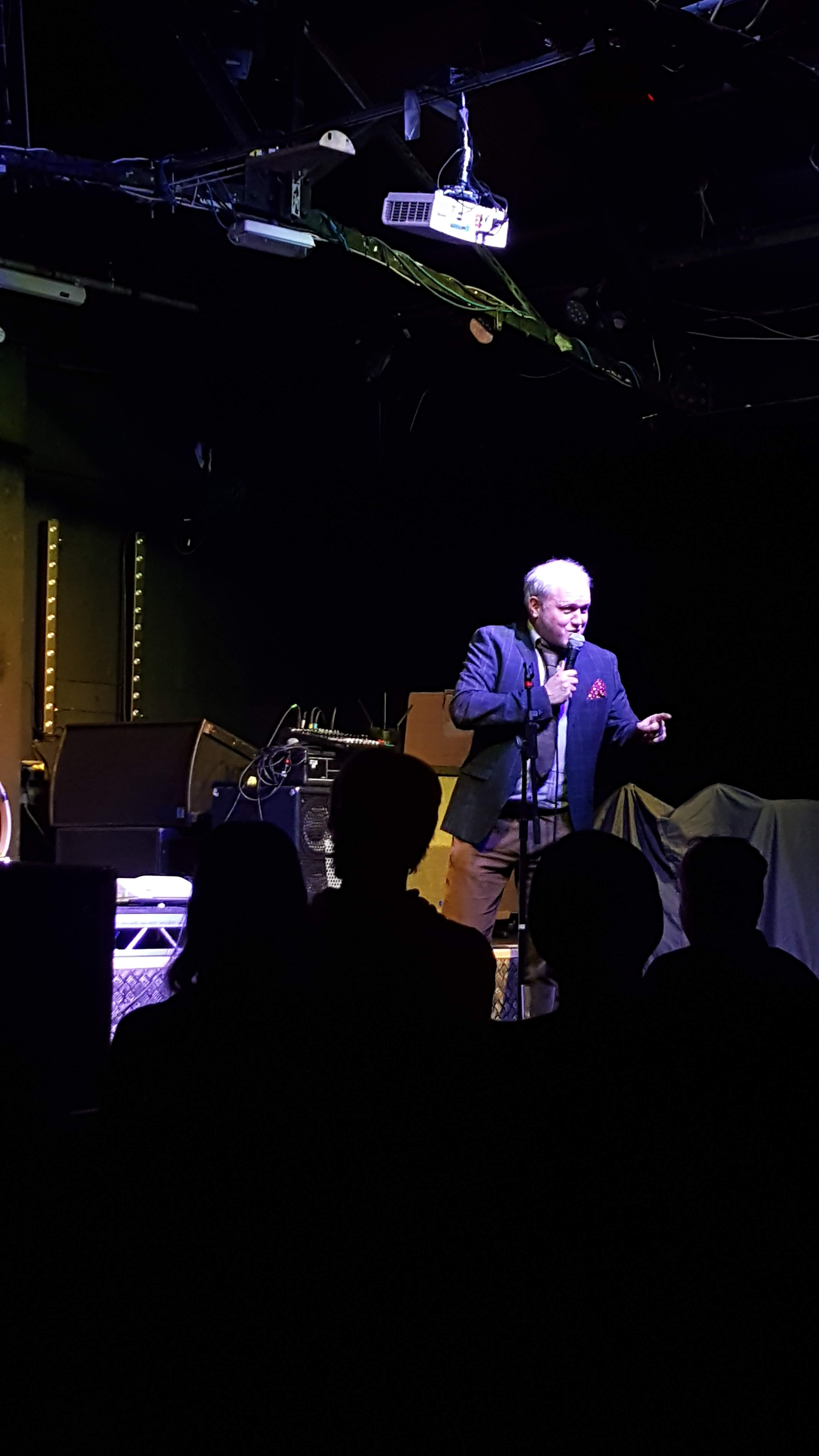
Toby Hadoke at XS Malarkey, 2019

XS Malarkey is a not for profit comedy club in Manchester hosted at 53two. It is promoted and compered by the comedian and actor Toby Hadoke, and runs every Tuesday night. In 2007, a Guardian article described XS Malarkey as a "great example of how a club should be run".

It began life in 1997 at Scruffy Murphys (now Studio Bar) in Fallowfield, before moving down the road to Bar XS on 25 September 2001, where the headline acts were Toby Foster and Jimmy Carr. In 2010, it moved once again to The Queen of Hearts (Now 256 Wilmslow Road), before moving to Platt Chapel 186 Wilmslow Road in 2011. During 2013, XS Malarkey was resident at the now defunct Jabez Clegg Beer Hall. In January 2014, XS Malarkey moved to the Pub/Zoo on Grosvenor Street, which was rebranded as the Bread Shed behind the Flour and Flagon in August 2017. The night was also hosted at CANVAS at Circle Square and the current home is 53Two off Deansgate.

During 2020, the club was forced to move its weekly show to an online-only platform due to UK COVID-19 lockdown restrictions. During this time the club also offered regular Sunday "Malarchive" interviews with established comedians. The online shows have been reinforced by audience contributions, including a recurring Marmalade Fandango fashion review, offering a balanced assessment of the compere's neckwear attire. The piano player Jay provides piano music pre show each week to entertain and warm up the audience before the comedy begins.

The club has won Best Comedy Club (North) nine times at the Chortle Awards, and Best Comedy Club twice at the North West Comedy Awards. Toby Hadoke also won 'Best Off-Stage Contribution' at the 2008 Chortle Awards.

Comedians whose began their careers at XS Malarkey include Jason Manford, Alan Carr, and Justin Moorhouse. The club has also featured appearances from Stewart Lee, Peter Kay, Mick Miller, Shazia Mirza, Chris Addison, Dave Spikey, Reginald D Hunter, Russell Howard, Jo Caulfield and Junior Simpson.
