= Alexis Dubus =

British actor and comedian

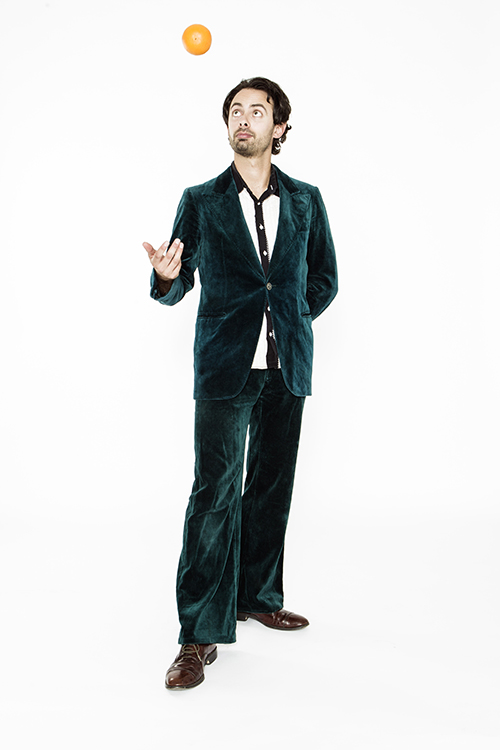
- Alexis Dubus
- Born: 1979 (age 46–47); Buckinghamshire, England
- Other name: Marcel Lucont
- Education: University of Warwick; École Philippe Gaulier

Comedy career
- Medium: Stand-up, character comedy, spoken word
- Website: alexisdubus.com

Alexis Dubus (born 1979) is an English alternative comedian and actor known for his French alter ego Marcel Lucont.

Born in Buckinghamshire, he studied Philosophy and Psychology at the University of Warwick, where he became part of the sketch troupe Ubersausage.

In 2003 he set up Falling Down With Laughter Comedy Club in London Bridge with fellow comedian Sy Thomas. The club ran until 2010.

He is a board member of The Alternative Comedy Memorial Society, at which he has appeared in various guises.

Dubus studied Le Jeu and Clowning at École Philippe Gaulier under master clown Philippe Gaulier.

His television acting roles include Nathan Barley (Channel 4), Pramface (BBC3), Derek (Channel 4) and Red Dwarf XI (Dave). As a stand-up comedian he's appeared on John Bishop's 2014 Christmas Show, Set List, Russell Howard's Good News and various stand-up shows on Comedy Central. He was also a regular on series 2 and 3 of Live at the Electric.

In New Zealand he has been a panellist on Best Bits and 7 Days.

He has made radio appearances on BBC Radio 4 Extra in 4 Extra Stands Up and BBC Radio 1's Phil And Alice's Comedy Lounge.

He performed at the Adelaide Fringe for several years, where he stirred local debate in 2016 after saying that the festival had lost its way, making it increasingly difficult for independent producers to make money. He returned to perform in the 2018 Fringe, praising a new initiative which helped to put more money in the artists' pockets by dropping inside ticket charges, but left disappointed that the festival was still not suited to independent producers and venues, losing track of the reason for its initial inception.

Dubus hosts the Comedy Cul-de-Sac podcast, in which established comedians give accounts of their worst ever experiences on stage.

== Bibliography ==
- Lucont, Marcel (New Holland Publishers, 2011). What We French Think of You British... And Where You Are Going Wrong

== Discography ==
As Marcel Lucont, he released the albums Vive Lucont! (2013), Flâneur, Raconteur, Bon-Viveur (2018) and For A Captive Audience (2021), all featuring songs and poetry.

== Edinburgh Fringe shows ==
- A R#ddy Brief History of Swearing (2008/9). A comedy lecture on the history of curse words, which won Dubus a Three Weeks Editors' award.
- Marcel Lucont: Sexual Metro (2009). The debut of Dubus's long-running French character Marcel Lucont, which won the Best Comedy Individual Award at Buxton Fringe.
- A Surprisingly Tasteful Show About Nudity (2010). Another lecture in the vein of his Swearing show, Dubus addressed the taboo of nudity, enlisting a different Fringe performer every night to stand as a life model as the audience entered the room.
- Marcel Lucont: Encore (2010). Dubus's second hour performed in character, also featuring a live artist on stage, sketching audience members. The show debuted at Edinburgh Fringe and went on to play at Adelaide Fringe, Melbourne Comedy Festival, Sydney Comedy Festival and New Zealand Comedy Festival.
- Marcel Lucont Etc. – A Chat Show (2011). An irreverent chat show hosted by Marcel Lucont, described as "the prince of the chat-show genre" by The List.
- Marcel Lucont: Gallic Symbol (2012). Winner of the Amused Moose Laughter Award for Best Comedy and also the Fringe World Award for Best Comedy. Alexis toured the UK with a 90-minute version of the show.
- Marcel Lucont A La Carte (2013). A concept show in which, for 10 days, people could bid for Marcel to perform for an hour a day at a time and location of their choosing, selecting certain poems, songs and routines from a menu.
- Alexis Dubus: Cars And Girls (2013/14). A series of true travel tales, first performed as a stand-up show and then adapted into a 50-minute poem, listed in Chortle's Ten Most Memorable Shows of 2014 and receiving 5 stars from The Scotsman.
- Marcel Lucont Is (2014). A multimedia show focusing on morality, mortality and masculinity, which also became a 90-minute touring show and was nominated for Best Comedy Show at the Fringe World Awards.
- Alexis Dubus Verses The World (2016–18). A collection of nonsense poems, songs and one-liners, shortlisted for Best Comedy Show at the Fringe World Awards 2018.
- Marcel Lucont's Whine List (2016–18). An interactive show, discussing audience members' worst moments in life. It was billed as "a kind of group therapy session, but one where everyone leaves more depressed." Whine List became a 30-date UK tour in 2017 and toured for 4 months around Australia and New Zealand in 2018.
- Marcel Lucont: No. Dix (2019–20). A celebration of Marcel's tenth year performing, featuring a live band. It was listed as one of the top ten comedy shows at Edinburgh Fringe 2019 by The Telegraph.
