= Toby Hadoke =

English actor, writer and stand-up comedian (born 1974)

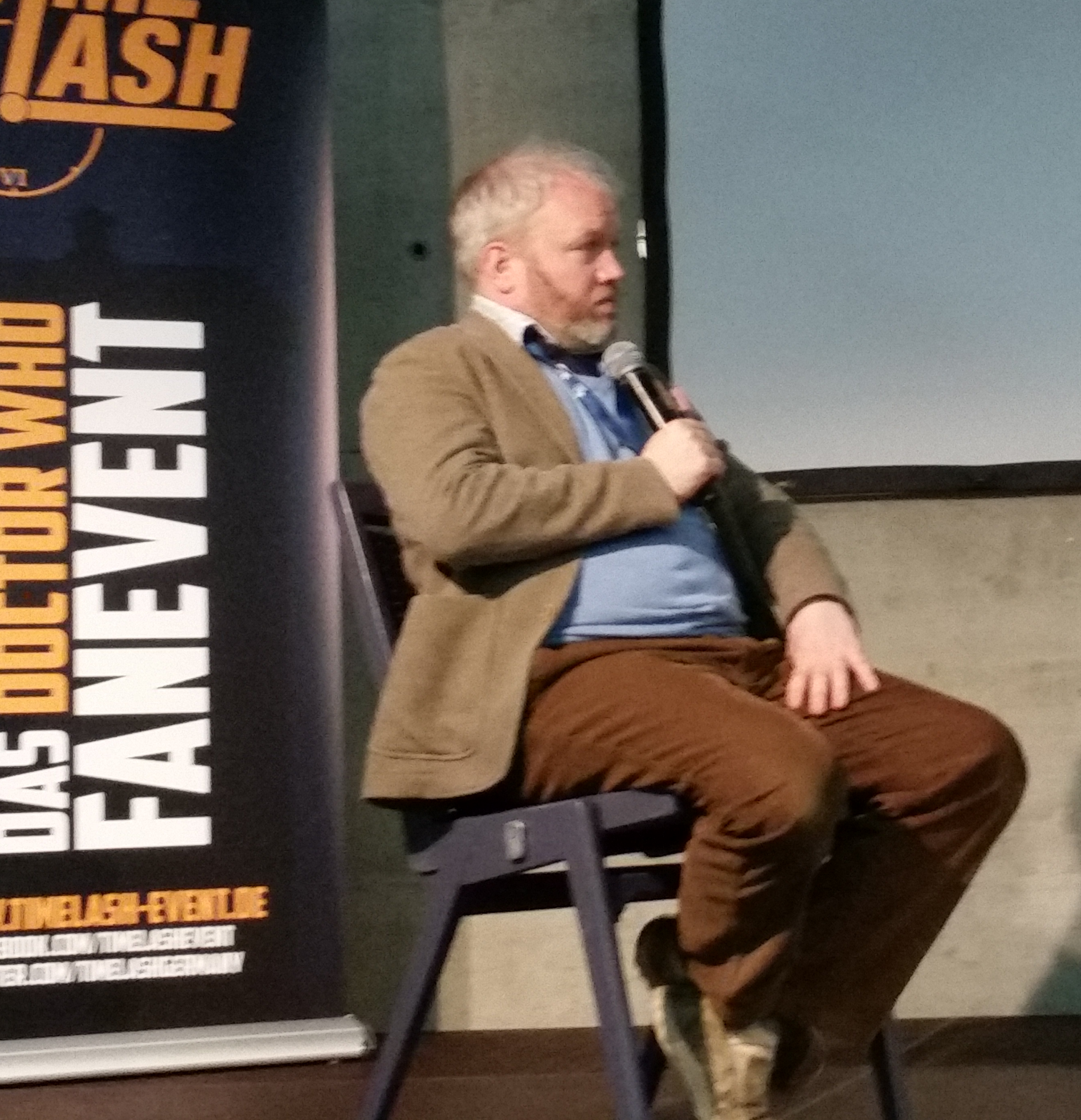
- Hadoke in 2017
- Born: 2 January 1974 (age 52); Shropshire, England, UK
- Education: University of Manchester
- Occupations: Actor, writer, stand-up comedian
- Spouse: Cherylee Houston
- Children: 1
- Awards: Les Dawson Award (2001)

Toby Hadoke (/ˈheɪdoʊk/ HAY-dohk; born 2 January 1974) is an English actor, writer, stand-up comedian and comedy promoter. He is known for his work on the Manchester comedy circuit, where he performs regularly, and as a prominent fan of the television series Doctor Who. He runs the XS Malarkey comedy club, and is involved with many comedy nights in the region. His comedy tends towards the topical and/or political.

== Early years ==
Born in between Ludlow and Bridgnorth in Shropshire, he grew up in Loughton. He was educated at Ludlow C.E. School and Ludlow 6th Form College before reading English and Drama at the University of Manchester, where he first dabbled in stand-up comedy.

== Stand-up career ==
Hadoke runs the XS Malarkey Comedy Club in Manchester. This began in 1997 at Scruffy Murphys, Fallowfield before moving in 2001 over the road to Bar XS (renamed Remedy in 2008). XS Malarkey then moved to the Bread Shed, behind the Flour and Flagon on Grosvenor Street. In 2023 it was announced the club night would relocate to CANVAS at Circle Square. XS has now found a home at 53two.

Hadoke is the regular compere for the night, which he runs on a non-profit making basis. Acts who have played there include Peter Kay, Mick Miller, Chris Addison, Sarah Millican, Dave Spikey, Reginald D Hunter and Jimmy Carr among others. The club also gave early breaks to Alan Carr, Justin Moorhouse and Jason Manford.

Hadoke appears regularly at The Comedy Store and The Frog and Bucket comedy clubs in Manchester.

He is a founding member of the Comedy Store sketch troupe The Unbroadcastable Radio Show.

Hadoke won the inaugural Les Dawson Award for Services To Comedy at the 2003 Manchester Comedy Festival. In 2008 he won the Chortle Award for Best Off-Stage Contribution for his work promoting comedy in the North West and at XS Malarkey.

In 2009, Hadoke appeared in the UK tour of the hit American improv show, Totally Looped.

== Moths Ate My Doctor Who Scarf ==
His first one-man show, Moths Ate My Doctor Who Scarf, was at the 2006 Edinburgh Festival Fringe.

In 2008, the show embarked on a much larger tour and continued in the UK in 2009, with international appearances in Los Angeles, at the New Zealand Comedy Festival, Toronto and Florida.

A full cast adaptation of Moths Ate My Doctor Who Scarf was recorded in May 2007 and broadcast on digital channel BBC7 in July, prior to a BBC Audiobooks CD release. It featured Hadoke as himself narrating, with guest appearances from Doctor Who actors Colin Baker and Louise Jameson, plus comedian Alfie Joey and Early Doors actor James Quinn as The Voice Of The BBC. It received a five star review from SFX magazine and was nominated as Best Drama in the 2008 Sony Awards.

A sequel show, My Stepson Stole My Sonic Screwdriver, was performed at the 2012 Edinburgh Fringe Festival.

On 17 November 2013 at the Garrick Theatre in London, Hadoke performed a double bill of both shows, which were recorded for future DVD release.

=== Other Doctor Who work ===
Hadoke's website lists a collection of ten connections with Doctor Who, including having a character named after him in Dale Smith's novel Heritage.

He has moderated the DVD commentaries for many Doctor Who stories, including The Rescue and The Romans (released in 2009 as a box set); The Curse of Peladon and The Monster of Peladon (released together in 2010); The Time Monster (released in 2010 as part of the "Myths and Legends" box set); The Dominators (released 2010); The Ark (released 2011); and The Krotons (released 2012). He also appeared in the special feature "Robophobia" for the Special Edition of The Robots of Death (released 2012).

In 2009, Hadoke collaborated with writer Rob Shearman to watch and comment on every episode of Doctor Who from the programme's debut in 1963 to David Tennant's final story. The resulting discussions are being published as Running Through Corridors: Rob and Toby's Marathon Watch of Doctor Who, a three-volume series from Mad Norwegian Press. The first volume, covering the 1960s, was published in 2010; the second volume, covering the 1970s, was published in 2016.

Hadoke appears as a bartender in a cameo appearance in An Adventure in Space and Time, a docudrama detailing the early history of Doctor Who.

== Acting career ==
His television appearances include Phoenix Nights, Coronation Street, Titanic - Birth of a Legend, Shameless, A & E, Casualty 1907, The Royal Today, and The Forsyte Saga. He has also voiced Toby the Tram Engine in the UK dub in the second season episode "The Super Axle" in Thomas & Friends: All Engines Go.

His theatre credits include work with the Royal Exchange Theatre, Manchester, The Dukes Theatre, Lancaster, and Opera North.

Hadoke has written obituaries for The Guardian and The Independent and is a frequent broadcaster on BBC Radio.

== Personal life ==
Hadoke has two sons from a previous relationship. He lives with his wife, actress Cherylee Houston, and their dog Bernard.
