= Idiots of Ants =

Idiots of Ants are a London-based comedy sketch group made up of Elliott Tiney, Benjamin Wilson, James Wrighton and Andrew Spiers. They have performed sketches on BBC Two, Fox News, BBC Three and BBC Radio 4. The name is a pun on Idiot Savant.

== History ==
Idiots of Ants formed in November 2006 and went on to perform and sell-out at the Edinburgh Festival in 2007. This self-titled Edinburgh debut received notices from the national press.

In August 2007 the Idiots were featured on the BBC 2 programme The Edinburgh Show.

In May 2008 they appeared on the BBC Three show The Wall. The sketch shown, "Facebook in real life", went on to top the most watched UK comedy video chart on YouTube.

The "Facebook in real life" video was played on Fox News (The Live Desk with Martha MacCallum) on 13 May 2008.

In May 2008 they performed a sketch live on the BBC Radio 4 show Loose Ends.

Idiots of Ants were commissioned by E4 to create a show as part of their Funny Cut season. This was broadcast in August 2008.

Idiots of Ants returned to the Edinburgh Festival in 2008 with their show 'Idiots of Ants 2008'.

In 2009 Idiots of Ants performed at the Montreal Just for Laughs Festival and the Edinburgh Festival where their show 'Idiots of Ants: This is War' was nominated for an Eddie (Edinburgh Comedy Awards).

In 2009 and 2010, Idiots of Ants performed at the award-winning New Theatre (Nottingham), first performing 'Idiots of Ants: This is War' and later performing a version of their 2010 Edinburgh show. Both performances were well received by the student audience.
