= New Art Club =

New Art Club is a comedy, theatre and dance company formed in 2001 by Tom Roden and Pete Shenton. New Art Club's performances 'marry stand up comedy with choreographic minimalism and a touch of philosophy.' Roden and Shenton are co-artistic directors and choreograph their own work, whilst often integrating other performers and performing collaboratively with other groups. Their diverse list of influences include Mark Whitelaw, Graeme Miller, DV8, Merce Cunningham and Reeves and Mortimer. They have toured across the United Kingdom, including performances at the Dundee Repertory Theatre, the Soho Theatre London and the Liverpool Playhouse, and have also taken their work to Australia, China, the United States and throughout Central and Northern Europe. Their latest show, Feel About Your Body, has been performed at the Edinburgh Fringe 2013 before moving onto a UK tour. New Art Club are Associate Artists at Cambridge Junction.

== Productions ==
- Feel About Your Body (2013)
- Quiet Act of Destruction (2011)
- Big Bag of Boom (2010)
- This Is Now (2009)
- New Art Club's Extra Ordinary World (2008)
- The Visible Men (2007)
- Slide Show (2006)
- Dance, Joke and Dance Jokes (2005)
- The Notcracker: Not Just Another Christmas Show (2005)
- Short Still Show (2004)
- Long Range Effort (2004)
- Another One (2004)
- The Electric Tales (2003)
- This Is Modern (2001)
