= Adam Hess (comedian) =

British comedian and writer

Adam Hess is a British comedian and writer. He performed at the 2016 Edinburgh Festival Fringe and had positive reviews in The Times.

== Notable performances ==
- Fosters Best Newcomer 2015 Nominee
- Live At The Palladium (ITV)
- Live From The BBC (BBC2)
- @Elevenish (ITV2)
- Count Arthur Strong (BBC1)
- Staff-writer for Russell Howard's Good News
- The Daily Telegraph's Funniest Tweet of 2013
