= The Stand Comedy Club =

British chain of stand-up comedy venues

- The Stand
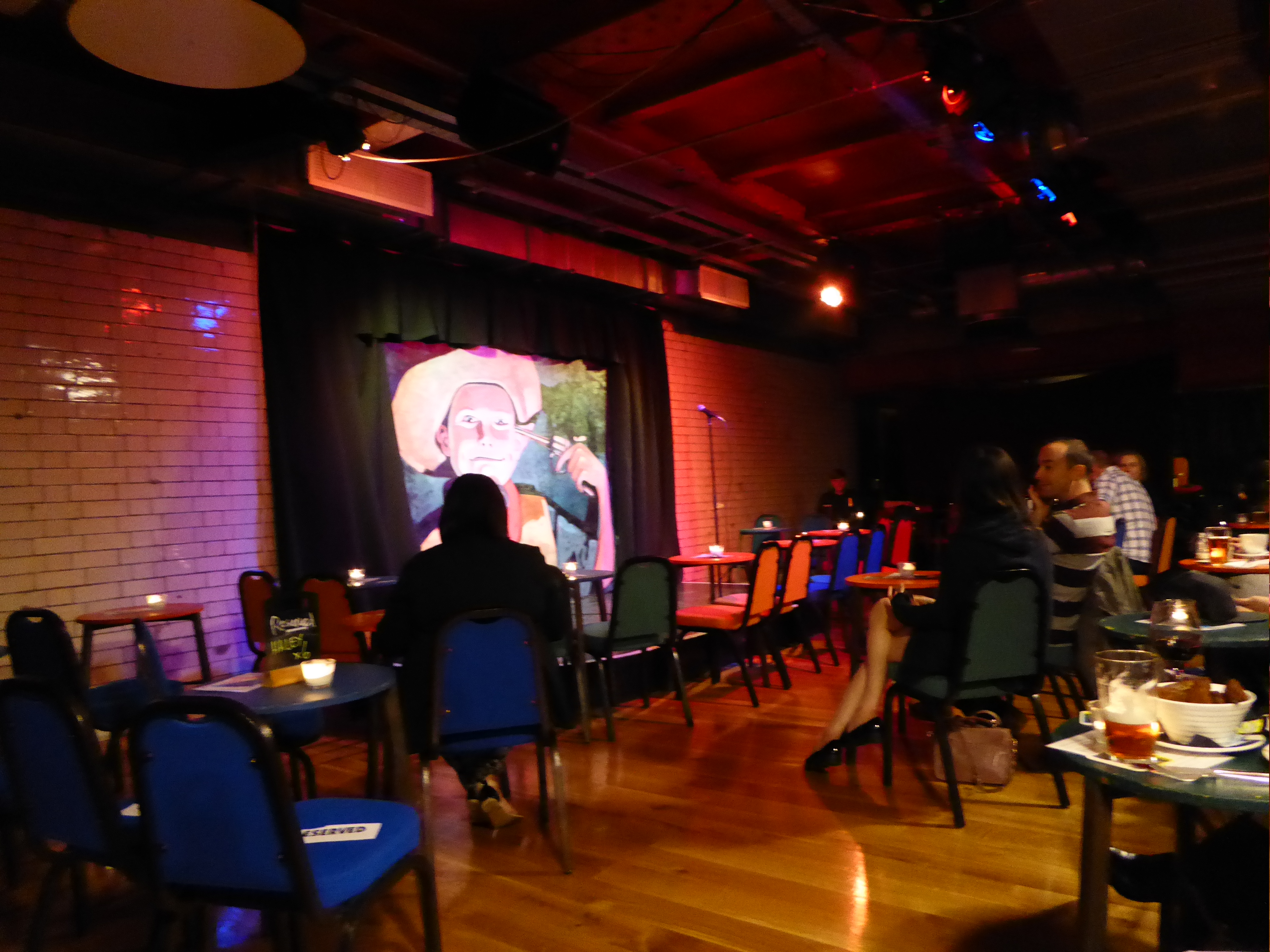
- Stage at The Stand, Newcastle
- Location: Glasgow & Edinburgh, Scotland; Newcastle upon Tyne, England
- Owner: Tommy Sheppard
- Type: Comedy

Construction
- Opened: 1995 (Edinburgh), 2000 (Glasgow), 2011 (Newcastle)

Website
- Official website

The Stand Comedy Club is a chain of three stand-up comedy venues in the cities of Edinburgh, Glasgow, and Newcastle upon Tyne.

== History ==
The Stand hosted its first regular club night on Thursday, 21 September 1995, in the small basement of W.J. Christie's Bar on the West Port in Edinburgh's Old Town. Seven people came and the total box office was £22. The founders, Tommy Sheppard and Jane Mackay, (along with working circuit comedians Gordon Brunton, Bill Dewar, Viv Gee and Reg Anderson) wanted to create a platform for emerging Scottish comedians, as well as a place for people who enjoyed comedy "that looks at the world from a slightly different perspective".

Sheppard had lived in London in the early 80s at the time of the alternative comedy boom and had seen Julian Clary and Jo Brand when they were just starting out in small alternative circuit venues. On his return to Scotland in the 1990s, he had been surprised to discover that there were no equivalent venues there. When The Stand opened a week-round venue in Edinburgh's York Place in 1998, it was the first dedicated comedy club in Scotland.

The Glasgow venue was opened in 2000, located in the basement of an old secondary school in Woodlands in the West End of the city.

The Stand runs live stand-up comedy shows every night of the week in both venues, with a programme of contemporary comedy from Scottish and international comedians. They also stage weekly open mic nights; Monday night in Edinburgh and Tuesday night in Glasgow.

The Stand Comedy Club has a mailing list of 22,000 people. In 2009, 10,000 tickets were sold to events between both the Glasgow and Edinburgh venues and roughly 600 acts a year are performed at these clubs every year. Between the two clubs an average of 1600 tickets are sold to events every week.

The venue has banned stag and hen parties, and talking during the performances, in an effort to minimise disruptive behaviour so that the comedians can concentrate upon delivering their crafted material.

=== Edinburgh Club ===
The club ran weekly when first set up in 1996 and relied on local talent. Expansion meant a second weekly venue in the Moscow Bar and by the end of 1997 a third weekly club had started.

In April 1997 Tommy Sheppard and Jane Mackay formed Salt 'n' Sauce Promotions Ltd. to develop the club on a commercial basis. After two and a half years of moving around and staging shows in different pubs, the club finally settled and moved into a new purpose-built venue on the edge of the city's New Town.

The Edinburgh club now stages up to ten shows per week and with its connection with the Edinburgh Festival Fringe it is the fourth largest comedy venue in the world's largest arts festival.

=== Glasgow Club ===
The Glasgow club opened on 14 April 2000. Initially the Glasgow club was open five nights a week and by 2003 it had joined the Edinburgh club opening 7 nights a week.

=== Newcastle club ===
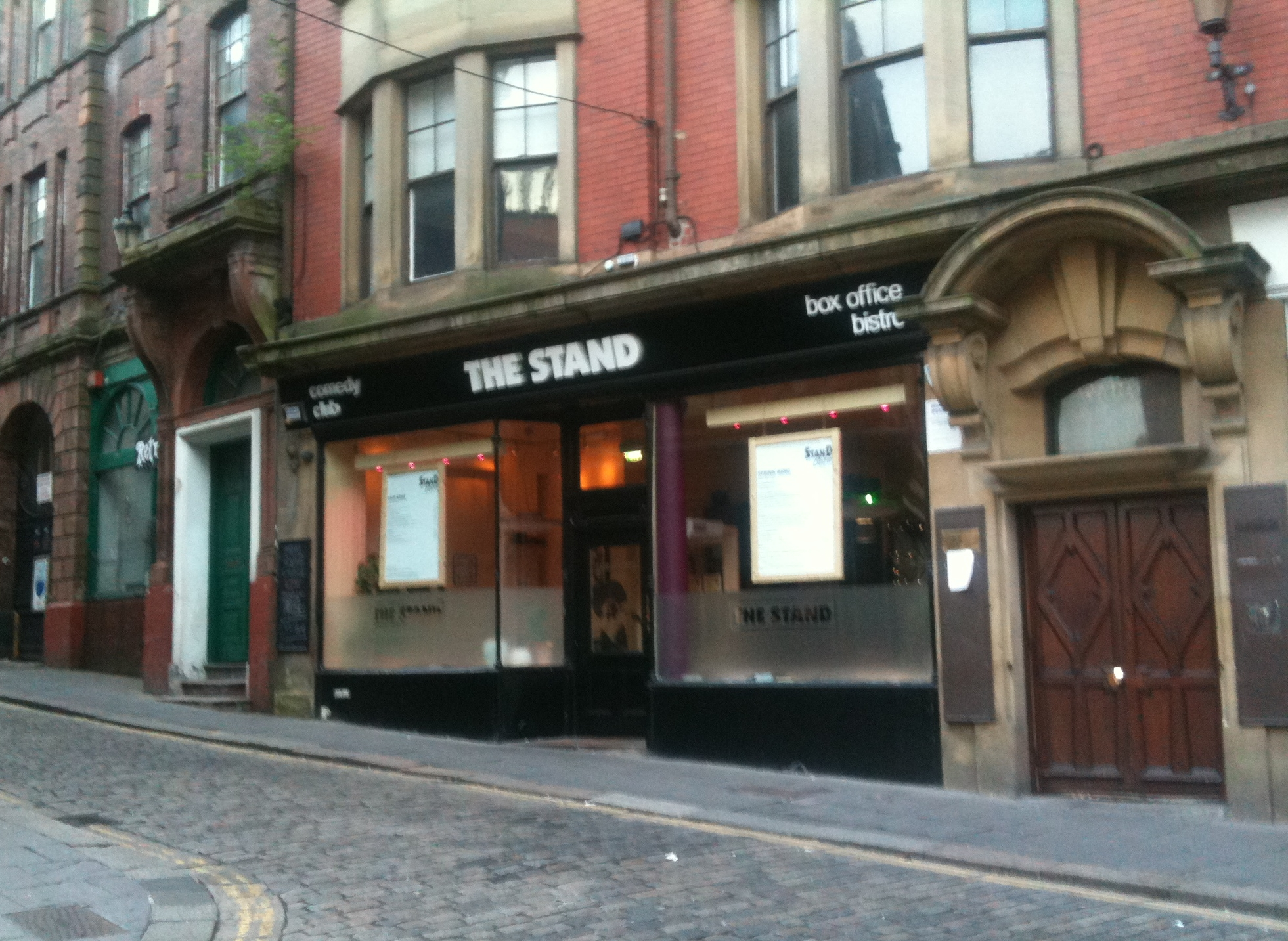
Exterior of The Stand, Newcastle

The Stand opened a venue in High Bridge in Newcastle upon Tyne on 27 October 2011. The Stand invested £750,000 in fitting out the basement venue, part of the former Waygood complex.

As the Newcastle club prepared to open, Tommy Sheppard said that he expects this venue to be the last Stand to open.

== Cowboy ==
The Stand's cowboy logo appears as a painted backdrop to the stages in The Stand's three venues. The backdrop, a boy dressed up as a cowboy holding a toy gun to his own head, was painted by artist Thomas MacGregor, who was involved in the founding of the club. The backdrop was repainted in 2022 by MacGregor to remove the toy gun, which was increasingly seen as problematic or offensive to some acts, and unhelpful in publicity images. The original painting, with gun, was auctioned with the proceeds going to charity.

== Famous acts ==
Since becoming a year-round dedicated comedy club, The Stand has been a platform for comedians such as Fred MacAulay, Kevin Bridges, Des Clarke and Frankie Boyle.

I remember this lanky, speccy guy coming down the stairs in quite an animated fashion. Trying to sound all professional, I said to him, ‘No, you can’t just turn up on the night. That’s not how it works.’ He told me he had 12 mates upstairs and they’d all pay the ticket price, I was sold. The lure of 12 paying punters made me amend all my principles — he was on the bill that night.

— The Stand Comedy Club co-owner, Tommy Sheppard on meeting Frankie Boyle, The Times Online

== Fundraising events ==
Over the year The Stand Comedy Club holds around ten benefit evenings which raises money for various charities such as the Red Cross and Amnesty International. Since 2005, the club has been able to raise money for these charities as the acts performing don't receive a fee and the money is then donated to the selected charity.

== New performers ==
The Stand's programme contains an event called Red Raw beginners' night, where new comics can request to be on the bill. When asked about changes to the club over the years the original founders have noticed that comedy has become more popular as thousands will now go out weekly to see a live show compared to dozens many years ago when The Stand was set up. As a result of the growth in the audience more performers have come through to try comedy out which has seen a three or four-month waiting list to get a spot on the Red Raw bill.

== Recognition ==
Tourist guides and websites recommend The Stand as a tourist attraction. and the clubs are recognised as contributors to the economy.

Without The Stand there would have been no comedy in Scotland, not because there wasn't any talent but because there was no shop window, and now there is.

— comedian Susan Morrison, BBC News Website
