= Paddy Young =

British comedian and actor

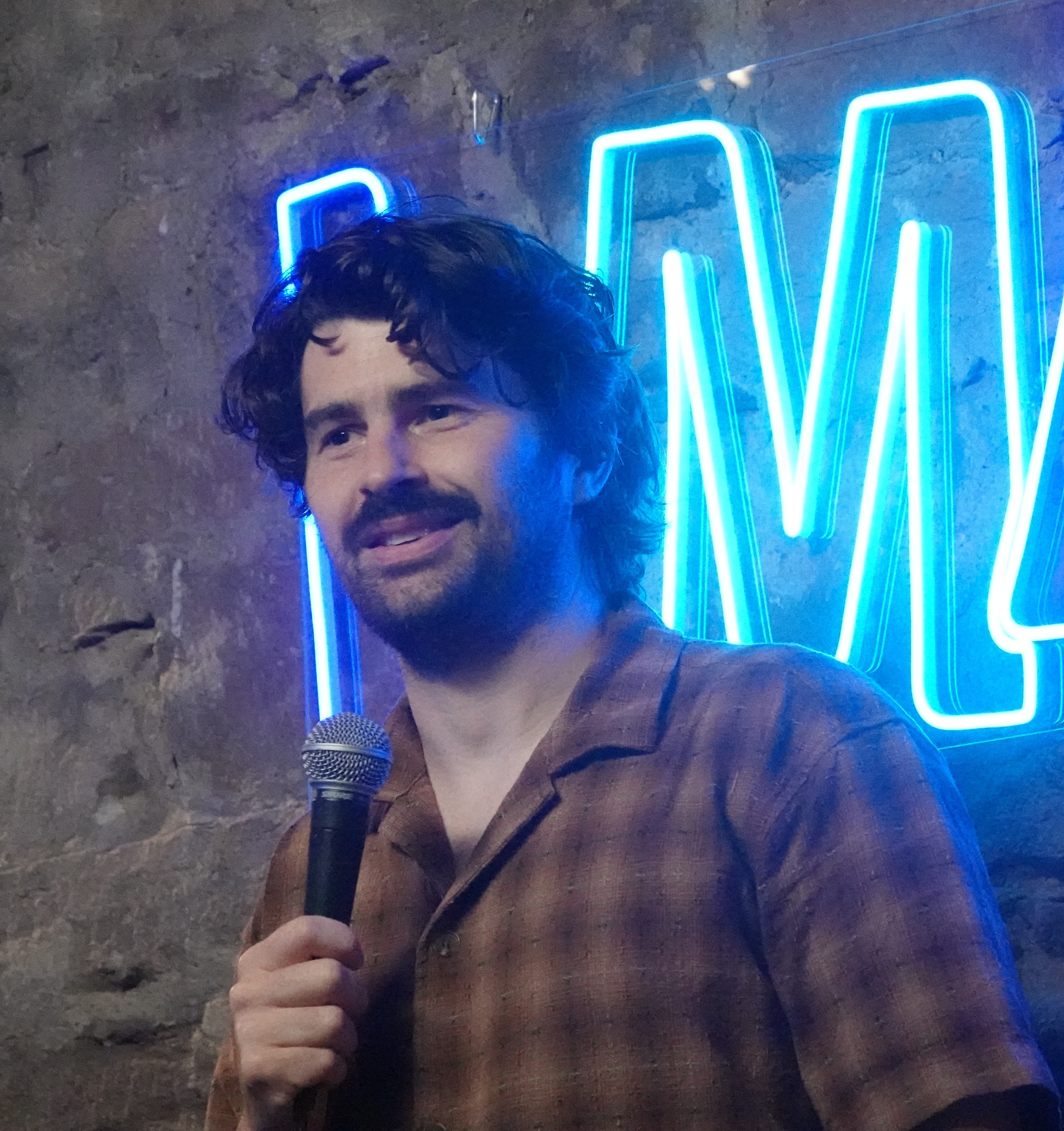
- Young at the 2025 Edinburgh Fringe
- Born: 11 July 1991 (age 35); England
- Education: Manchester School of Theatre
- Occupations: Comedian, actor
- Years active: 2010s–present
- Known for: Saturday Night Live UK

Patrick Young (born 11 July 1991) is a British comedian and actor. He is best known for being a cast member on Saturday Night Live UK.

== Personal life ==
Young grew up in Scarborough and has three sisters. He started acting as a child when he was in plays held at the Stephen Joseph Theatre. He attended the Manchester School of Theatre, graduating with a bachelors in 2015. He now lives in London with fellow comedians Horatio Gould and Bebe Cave. In June 2026, he injured his hand with a samurai sword belonging to Sam Campbell.

He has cited Vic & Bob, Norm Macdonald and the magazine Viz as his comedy heroes.

== Career ==
=== Comedy ===
Young started doing open mic nights while living in Manchester. Young's first show at the Edinburgh Fringe was "Ay Up It's Stand Up: Paddy Young & Adam Flood" in 2021. In 2023, he was nominated for a Best Newcomer award at the Fringe, and won the Chortle Award for Best Newcomer. His first UK tour was in 2024, titled "Hungry, Horny, Scared", which was later filmed and made into a television special.

His 2025 Edinburgh show, Paddy Young Presents: A Night with the Stars, featured comedians including Ed Night, Sam Campbell, Alison Spittle, Dan Tiernan, Horatio Gould, Katie Norris and Mike Rice.

In 2026, it was announced that Young would be a cast member in the first series of Saturday Night Live UK, and was later revealed that he, along with Ania Magliano, would also serve as anchors on the show's Weekend Update segment. He hosts the podcast Paddy Will Help, in which he and a guest offer advice to callers. Previous guests have included Ed Night, Mike Rice and Emma Sidi. He also hosts the live show Floggers with Sam Campbell, in which they play auctioneers with items provided by the audience. Entrance is refused to anyone who does not bring "1 item to sell" and "£70 in cash".

=== Acting ===
Young made his acting debut in 2017 in the series Timewasters. He had a recurring role in the series Everyone Else Burns as Jebediah in 2024, appearing in six episodes. He helped write eleven episodes of the podcast Fin vs The Internet, hosted by Fin Taylor. Young was in an episode of Mitchell and Webb Are Not Helping in 2025.

=== Writing ===
In 2025, Young co-wrote the series 1 finale of Mitchell and Webb Are Not Helping. Young co-wrote five episodes of Make that Movie, alongside his frequent collaborator Sam Campbell.

== Edinburgh Fringe shows ==
Year	Title	Notes
2021	Ay Up It's Stand Up: Paddy Young & Adam Flood	With Adam Flood
2022	Paddy Young: Laugh You Rats!	
2023	Paddy Young: Hungry, Horny, Scared	
2024	Paddy Young: If I Told You I'd Have to Kiss You	
2025	Paddy Young Presents: A Night with the Stars	
2026	Paddy Young: Will Sir Be Laughing Alone?	
