= Helen Bauer =

English comedian (born 1991)

- Born: Helen Ann Bauer; 25 March 1991 (age 35); Wandsworth, London, England
- Education: Court Moor School; Sixth Form College, Farnborough
- Occupations: Comedian, writer, actor
- Years active: 2014–present
- Height: 6 ft 1 in (185 cm)
- Website: https://helenbauer.co.uk/

Helen Ann Bauer (born 25 March 1991) is an English actor, comedian and writer known for her stand-up comedy in the UK and Berlin, Germany. She was nominated for the Edinburgh Comedy Awards in 2019.

== Early life ==
Bauer is the middle of three children born in Wandsworth, London to Ann and Michael Bauer. She grew up in Fleet, Hampshire and is of German heritage. Her mother ran a drama school from their home, which Helen attended. Her father worked in the water industry. She attended Court Moor School in Fleet, Hampshire and Sixth Form College, Farnborough.

== Career ==
Bauer moved to Germany at 23 and began her stand-up career there. She first came to prominence when she was nominated for the BBC New Comedy Award in 2018.

In 2018, she shared a bill at the Pleasance Dome during the Edinburgh Fringe Festival. She debuted her first hour-long show, "Little Miss Baby Angel Face", at the Edinburgh Fringe Festival in 2019 and was nominated for the Best Newcomer award. Her subsequent shows have included Madam Good Tit in 2022 and Grand Supreme Darling Princess in 2023. Bauer toured her show Bless Her in 2025, for which she was nominated for the Next Up Biggest in Comedy Award at the Edinburgh Fringe Festival. Bless Her, as a work in progress, won Best New Show at the Leicester Comedy Festival Awards in 2025.

Bauer has appeared on Extraordinary, Am I Being Unreasonable?, Live at the Apollo, The Emily Atack Show, 8 Out of 10 Cats Does Countdown, Comedy Central Live, and Hypothetical. She created and starred in a sitcom pilot, Small Doses, for BBC Three. She starred as Pat in Sam Campbell's Channel 4 comedy series Make That Movie (2026).

Bauer co-hosted the Daddy Look at Me podcast with Rosie Jones. She co-hosted the Trusty Hogs podcast with fellow comedian Catherine Bohart from September 2021 to August 2025. She currently hosts the Helen's Log podcast.

== Influences ==
Bauer has named Julia Davis as her comedy hero.

== Filmography ==
=== Acting ===
Year	Title	Role	Notes	Ref
2022	Late Night Mash	Melinda Major	2 episodes	
2022	Small Doses	Kate	Pilot	
2022–2025	Am I Being Unreasonable?	Lauren	4 episodes	
2024	Extraordinary	Taylor	1 episode	
2025	Mitchell and Webb Are Not Helping	Sarah	1 episode	
2026	Make That Movie	Pat	6 episodes	

=== As herself ===
Year	Title	Role	Notes	Ref
2021	Hypothetical	Panellist	Series 3, episode 6	
2021	Live at the Apollo	Guest comedian	Series 16, episode 2	
2021	Alan Davies: As Yet Untitled	Herself	Series 6, episode 2	
2021	The Emily Atack Show	Sketch ensemble	Series 2, episode 3	
2023	Pointless Celebrities	Quiz participant (Team with Sunil Patel)	Series 15, Special	
2025	8 Out of 10 Cats Does Countdown	Panellist	Series 27, episode 12	
2026	Guy Montgomery's Guy Mont-Spelling Bee (AU)	Herself	Season 3, episode 4	

=== Comedy specials ===
Year	Title	Ref
2025	Little Miss Baby Angel Face	
2025	Madam Good Tit	
2025	Grand Supreme Darling Princess	
