= Guy Montgomery's Guy Mont-Spelling Bee (Australian TV series) =

Australian comedy TV series

- Genre: Comedy; Panel show Game show
- Created by: Guy Montgomery
- Written by: Emma Holland; Abby Howells
- Presented by: Guy Montgomery
- Starring: Aaron Chen; Sam Campbell
- Composer: Mahuia Bridgman-Cooper
- Country of origin: Australia
- Original language: English
- No. of series: 3
- No. of episodes: 29

Production
- Executive producers: Cam Bakker; Bronwynn Bakker; Greg Sitch; Guy Montgomery; Mark Sutton
- Producers: Cam Bakker; Bronwynn Bakker
- Camera setup: Multi-camera
- Running time: 48 minutes
- Production companies: Kevin & Co.; ABC Television

Original release
- Network: ABC
- Release: 14 August 2024 – present

Related
- Guy Montgomery's Guy Mont-Spelling Bee

Guy Montgomery's Guy Mont-Spelling Bee is an Australian television comedy panel show on the ABC, created and presented by Guy Montgomery and co-hosted by Aaron Chen (later Sam Campbell), based on the New Zealand TV show of the same name.

Guy Mont-Spelling Bee is loosely based on a spelling bee: each episode, four comedians participate in a series of rounds, where the goal is almost always to spell words or names in rounds that are "designed to befuddle, bamboozle, and bedazzle". The winner of each episode competes again the following episode and the loser of each episode must wear a dunce cap in the Dunce's Corner.

The eight-episode first series premiered on 14 August 2024; every episode was made available on ABC iview that day. The show's second season was released in 2025, and the third in 2026.

Montgomery won a Logie Award for hosting the show in 2025.

== Production ==
Guy Mont-Spelling Bee is co-produced by Kevin & Co. and ABC Television. This is the second Kevin & Co. production outside New Zealand, having earlier been involved in the production of Taskmaster Australia.

The first series was filmed from 26–29 June 2024 at the ABC Ultimo Centre. The cast includes Wil Anderson, Tony Armstrong, Concetta Caristo, Urzila Carlson (who also appeared in the original New Zealand version), Tom Gleeson, Peter Helliar, Geraldine Hickey, Nazeem Hussain, Demi Lardner, Zoë Coombs Marr, Luke McGregor, Tim Minchin, Rhys Nicholson and Steph Tisdell.

The first series of Guy Mont-Spelling Bee aired on BBC Three starting in February 2026.

Emma Holland and Abby Howells were hired as co-writers for season 3, as previous co-writer and co-executive producer Joseph Moore was working on Saturday Night Live UK.

== Format ==
Each episode begins with the four contestants being introduced (with the returning champion playing on the rightmost podium) before participating in The Spelling Round and ends with The Buzz Round. In between those rounds, three other rounds and a mini-game are played with Aaron Chen acting as an assistant in these rounds.

=== The Spelling Round ===
Guests pick a word from the Coward's Cup (easy to spell words worth one point), the Person's Purse (worth two points), or the Bucket of Bravery (words deemed challenging to spell and worth three points). The guest receives the points if their spelling is correct. In season 3, a mandatory fourth option was introduced for defending champions who had won at least two previous episodes. The Flagon of Futility (almost impossible words that are worth five or negative five points for a correct or incorrect answer).

=== Original rounds ===
==== Season 1 ====
- Aaron'd the World: Aaron spins a model globe and points at a country randomly. The guest must then spell a word relating to the country picked out.
- A Decent Proposal: Guests are put into pairs. Each guest is assigned one easy word and one near impossible word to have their partner spell. If both guests spell correctly, each guest receives two points. If only one guest in the pair spells correctly, they get four points. If neither guest spells correctly, no one earns any points. (Similar to the Prisoner's Dilemma)
- Battle of the Codes: Each guest is paired with an athlete. Each pair is given a word relating to their football code. The duo can then talk about the difficulty of spelling the word but not how to spell. The nominated speller will then attempt to spell the word. Correct spellers bring their duos to the next round. Duos with an incorrect speller are then "benched", eliminated from the round and are given a brief "post game interview" by the host of "Chen's Den for Sporting Men, They/Thems & Wo-men", Aaron Chen.
- Can You Spell What Aaron is Cooking?: Chef Aaron gives each guest a cooking demonstration (including ingredients and steps). Guests must then spell the dish being made.
- Do the D.A.N.C.E.: Dancers perform a dance routine in the studio in front of the guest. The guest must then successfully identify and spell the dance's name for two full points. The guest can decide to ask for the dance's name, but they must spell its name while performing the routine (granting one point).
- Drinks: Guest must spell their chosen drink.
- Girt by C: Each guest must select an Australian water formation for Aaron to drink a sample of. The guest must successfully spell a certain word that was used or is related to Aaron's tasting notes of the water. Each word in this round begins and ends with the letter C.
- Hometown Hero: Guests spell a word that relates to the area they came from.
  - In episode 1, since Carlson was born in South Africa, a map of that country was also depicted in addition to the map of Australia.
- Horsing: A Round: Each guest has a horse assigned to them in a "horse race." Guests spell horse-related words to allow their horse to advance; otherwise, their horse remains stationary. Guests may also gamble on any horse to win the race (to a maximum of five points at 2/1 odds).
  - A variation of Horsing: A Round, titled Gone to the Dogs, was played in season 3. The game remained the same, with dog-related words given to the players and a greyhound race being used for the race.
- Impressions: Each guest will be given an image of a famous celebrity or public figure. The guest must then spell the celebrity's name while giving an (accurate) impression of said celebrity. One point is awarded for the spelling; another point is awarded for the impression.
- Money: Guests pick a denomination of Australian currency, which includes currently circulating coins and banknotes, to spell a word related to their chosen denomination.
- Spell the Crew Member's Name: Guests must identify and spell the correct full name of a crew member of the show.
- Spell the Crime, Do the Time: Guests are given words related to crime that must be spelled correctly. Incorrect spellers are then kept in a spelling gaol guarded by Officer Aaron until the end of the round. The round ends when all guests are imprisoned.
- Spell the Disaster: The guest must spell the distress signal of a historic disaster.
- Spell the Ethnicity: Guests must spell out the ethnicity of a model.
- Spell Your Own Adventure: Each guest must pick a choose-your-own-adventure book. Each decision being made in the book must be spelled correctly. Your book ends when a word is spelled incorrectly or if the chosen path leads to a "perilous demise".
- The Hat Hat: Guests are given a "silly hat" to wear, which they must accurately spell. Guests with an incorrect spelling in this round must keep their hat on until they spell a word correctly.
- The Spelling Spell: Magician Aaron pulls out a word from his magic hat. The guest can either spell this word or ask for a harder word for two points. Then, the guest can then spell the harder word or proceed to an even harder word for four points.
- Who Owns It?: Each guest must spell a word which, according to Guy, has its ownership be a source of conflict between the Australians and New Zealanders. One point is awarded for the correct spelling; another point is awarded for correctly identifying the rightful country of origin of the item being referred to.

=== Adapted rounds ===
- Feelings: Guests must identify an item by touch and then spell it.
- Homophones: Guests must spell the correct word from homophones.
- Instruments: Guests hear a musical instrument and must spell it.
- Social Media: Montgomery confronts guests with past social media posts, and they must recreate or rectify typos, or spell a given related word.
- Spell it Better: Guests invent a new and improved spelling for an existing word chosen by Montgomery.
- Spell the Audience Name: Guests choose a member of the audience to spell their full (legal) name.
- Wingdings: Guests must translate a word displayed in Wingdings.

=== The Buzz Round ===
The Buzz Round refers to the fast-paced round where words based on the chosen theme are spelled in a rapid-fire manner. The guest that is in last place, or chosen by Montgomery among those tied in last place, chooses one of four categories provided by Montgomery to start the round. Once the round starts, the guest who hits the buzzer first is given an opportunity to spell the word. Each word is worth one point, but the guest is docked one point if their spelling is incorrect. Beginning in season 3, if a defending champion had won at least the previous two episodes, they were handicapped by having multiple buzzers (equal to their number of previous wins), where the active buzzer would alternate between questions.

The amount of time given in this round varies with each episode. The round and game ends once the voice of the Spelling Gods utters the words, "Stop spelling!" However, if a contestant has buzzed in as the Spelling Gods have proclaimed the end of the game, they may finish the word.

=== End of episode ===
At the end of each episode, the player with the highest score is declared the winner and is given a giant novelty ticket to appear in the next episode. In the event of a tie, a sudden-death word is given. Conversely, the guest (and in the event of a tied last place, guests) with the lowest score are gently applauded as they walk to the "Dunce's Corner" to wear the dreaded dunce cap.

Montgomery ends each episode with a recurring sign-off in which he gives himself a new name, accompanied by a humorous explanation for the name.

== Episodes ==
Season	Episodes	Originally released	
Season	Episodes	First released	Last released
1	8	14 August 2024	2 October 2024
2	10	4 June 2025	6 August 2025
3	10	29 April 2026	1 July 2026
Christmas Special		24 December 2025	
2026 Special		2026	

=== Season 1 (2024) ===
The first season premiered on 14 August 2024, with new episodes airing each Wednesday night. All eight episodes were released at once on ABC iview. The air dates shown in the table below are for ABC TV.

No. in season	Guests	Original release date	Australian viewers (national)
1	Urzila Carlson, **Nazeem Hussain**, Danielle Walker, Tom Gleeson	14 August 2024	659,000
The Spelling Round; Money; Spell it Better; Hometown Hero; Spell the Audience Name; The Buzz Round (Politics) Sign-off: Chai Montgomery — "because it's time for me to have a cup of tea."
2	Geraldine Hickey, Peter Helliar, Urvi Majumdar, **Nazeem Hussain**	21 August 2024	508,000
The Spelling Round; The Hat Hat; Wingdings; Can You Spell What Aaron Is Cooking?; Homophones; The Buzz Round (Sexy) Sign-off: Satisfy Montgomery — "because I'm feeling very pleased with myself."
3	**Cameron James**, Jenny Tian, Tim Minchin, Nazeem Hussain	28 August 2024	471,000
The Spelling Round; Horsing: A Round; Spell the Crew Member's Name; Impressions; A Decent Proposal; The Buzz Round (Zoo) Sign-off: Mummified Montgomery — "because tonight's show has got me feeling rapt!"
4	**Wil Anderson**, Steph Tisdell, Demi Lardner, Cameron James	4 September 2024	419,000
The Spelling Round; Spell the Crime, Do the Time; Drinks; Instruments; The Buzz Round (Medieval) Sign-off: Supply Montgomery — "because my wife demands I come home right now."
5	**Tom Ballard**, Luke McGregor, Nikki Britton, Wil Anderson	11 September 2024	477,000
The Spelling Round; The Spelling Spell; Spell the Ethnicity; Spell Your Own Adventure; The Buzz Round (Fashion) Sign-off: Wi-Fi Montgomery — "because I'm getting 'router' here."
6	Rhys Nicholson, Concetta Caristo, Dan Rath, **Tom Ballard**	18 September 2024	425,000
The Spelling Round; Aaron'd the World; Do the D.A.N.C.E.; Spell the Audience Name; The Buzz Round (Biblical Times) Sign-off: Nearby Montgomery — "because I'm going to take a walk in a neighbourhood near you."
7	**Greg Larsen**, Zoë Coombs Marr, Tony Armstrong, Tom Ballard	25 September 2024	488,000
The Spelling Round; Who Owns It?; Feelings; Battle of the Codes; The Buzz Round (Office) Guest-starring Isaiah Papali'i, Nick Haynes, Alex Chidiac, and Tom Hooper Sign-off: Edify Montgomery — "because I feel morally and intellectually improved."
8	Michael Hing, **Tom Walker**, Alex Lee, Greg Larsen	2 October 2024	445,000
The Spelling Round; Girt by C; Spell the Disaster; A Decent Proposal; Social Media; The Buzz Round (Books) Sign-off: Sky High Montgomery — "because I'm feeling ten feet tall."

Winners in bold, dunces in italics.

=== Season 2 (2025) ===
The studio elements of the second series were recorded at ABC Studio 22 in Sydney from 19 to 26 February 2025, consisting of 10 episodes and 1 Christmas special. The first episode of season 2 was shown on 4 June at 8:35 pm, with all ten standard episodes released at once on ABC iView.

No. in season	Guests	Original release date	Australian viewers (national)
1	Lloyd Langford, **Hannah Gadsby**, Nina Oyama, Tom Walker	4 June 2025	1,034,000
The Spelling Round; Aaron, Your Dirty Laundry; Alphabetter; What Do You Do?; Spell the Audience Name; The Buzz Round (The Circus) Sign-off: 4th of July Montgomery — "because I'm ready for independence."
2	**Julia Zemiro**, Alex Ward, Dane Simpson, Hannah Gadsby	11 June 2025	1,058,000
The Spelling Round; The Love Spell; Say Your Vowels; Rural Australia; Homophones; The Buzz Round (Cars) Sign-off: Preoccupied Montgomery — "because I'm very focussed on getting to bed."
3	Rove McManus, He Huang, Emma Holland, **Julia Zemiro**	18 June 2025	781,000
The Spelling Round; Spell the Difference; Come Up With the Coolest Number Plate; Flags; Hometown Hero; The Buzz Round (Olympics) Sign-off: Petrify Montgomery — "because...boo!"
4	Denise Scott, **Kirsty Webeck**, Takashi Wakasugi, Julia Zemiro	25 June 2025	891,000
The Spelling Round; The Hat Hat; Invent A Swear Word; Greengrocer; Spell the Audience Name; The Buzz Round (Dairy) Sign-off: Baha'i Montgomery — "because I believe in the unity of all people."
5	Becky Lucas, Alexei Toliopoulos, Tony Martin, **Kirsty Webeck**	2 July 2025	923,000
The Spelling Round; Impressions; Pangram Grand Slam; Speance; Eat the Band; The Buzz Round (Prison) Sign-off: Doctor Dre and Snoop D O double-G U Y Montgomery — "'cause I'll see you on the next episode."
6	Josh Thomas, Abby Howells, Ray Badran, **Kirsty Webeck**	9 July 2025	618,000
The Spelling Round; Can You Spell What Aaron is Cooking?; Onomatopoeia; A Decent Proposal; The Spelling Gym; The Buzz Round (Creepy-Crawlies) Sign-off: Golden Eye Montgomery — "because I'm off to play some Nintendo 64."
7	Dave Hughes, Elouise Eftos, Sashi Perera, **Kirsty Webeck**	16 July 2025	911,000
The Spelling Round; Show and Spell; Spelling Hell; Battle of the Codes; Maths; The Buzz Round (Board Games) Guest-starring Rhiannan Iffland, Nedd Brockmann, Noemie Fox and Samuel Short Sign-off: Popeye Montgomery — "'cause I'm itching for some spinach!"
8	Dilruk Jayasinha, Susie Youssef, Virginia Gay, **Kirsty Webeck**	23 July 2025	772,000
The Spelling Round; Spelling Carnival; Singuistics; Spell Your Own Adventure; The Buzz Round (The '90s) Sign-off: The Bridge On The River Kwai Montgomery — "'cause this episode deserves seven Oscars!"
9	Hamish Blake, Lou Wall, Suren Jayemanne, **Kirsty Webeck**	30 July 2025	942,000
The Spelling Round; Gone Fishin'; The Keith Urban Dictionary; Aussie Aussie Aussie Oi! Oi! Oi!; Shut Up and Spell; The Buzz Round (Pirates) Sign-off: Beatify Montgomery — "'cause I'm doing the work of a saint."
10	Julia Morris, **Gillian Cosgriff**, Lizzy Hoo, Kirsty Webeck	6 August 2025	909,000
The Spelling Round; Spell Me Like One of Your French Words; Spell It Better; The Time Machine; Spell the Audience Name; The Buzz Round (Kitchen) Sign-off: Junior High Montgomery — "'cause I'm going back to school."

Winners in bold, dunces in italics.

=== Season 3 (2026) ===
The third series was recorded at ABC Studio 22 in Sydney from 21 to 29 April 2026, consisting of 10 normal episodes and one themed special. The third season premiered on 29 April 2026, with Sam Campbell replacing Aaron Chen as the assistant.

Episodes from this season also feature episode titles, usually based on a humorous quote said during the episode. While the first seven episodes aired on ABC TV and ABC iview at the same time, the last three episodes debuted on iview on 10 June 2026, ahead of their broadcast.

No. in season	Title	Guests	Original release date	Australian viewers (national)
1	"Will You Stop Bringing Up My Parents!"	Andrew Denton, Michelle Brasier, **Phil Wang**, Gillian Cosgriff	29 April 2026	970,000
The Spelling Round; Third Birthday Party; Nicknames; An Offer You Can Refuse; Spell The Audience Name; The Buzz Round (Famous Mice) Sign-off: Guy Montgomery — "because that's the name I was given at birth."
2	"A Red Mist of Vowels and Consonants!"	**Frank Woodley**, Shabana Azeez, Sarah Keyworth, Phil Wang	6 May 2026	912,000
The Spelling Round; Border Patrol; Just My Type; Do Feed The Birds; The Buzz Round (Green) Sign-off: Uruguay Montgomery — "because I sure am a guay."
3	"It's Not Math!"	**Melanie Bracewell**, Andy Saunders, Anne Edmonds, Frank Woodley	13 May 2026	855,000
The Spelling Round; Noah Thing or Two; H.R.; The Hat Hat; Opposite Day; The Buzz Round (Pasta) Sign-off: Gal Montgomery — "'cause that's my sister's name."
4	"Tony Frogmouth!"	Akmal, Helen Bauer, **Scout Boxall**, Melanie Bracewell	20 May 2026	870,000
The Spelling Round; A Word in the Hand; A New Idiom; I'm Spellin' Double; Spell the Audience Name; The Buzz Round (A Little Bit of Nice) Sign-off: Drip-Dry Montgomery — "because I don't believe in towels."
5	"No Cat Died Today!"	David O’Doherty, **Rose Matafeo**, Tim McDonald, Scout Boxall	27 May 2026	528,000
The Spelling Round; Video Beezy; A Decent Proposal; Talent Show; The Buzz Round (Classy) Sign-off: Pinto Montgomery — "because I see the world through rose-tinted glasses."
6	"There's Always Time for Clockman!"	Charlie Pickering, **Demi Adejuyigbe**, Ben Kochan, Rose Matafeo	3 June 2026	625,000
The Spelling Round; The Clockman Cometh; International Women's Day; Do the D.A.N.C.E; All Aboard; The Buzz Round (Animals I Could Kill) Sign-off: Fly Montgomery — "'cause mine's been down the whole time."
7	"Crusty Demons of the Stock Market"	Joanne McNally, Brett Blake, Luke Kidgell, **Demi Adejuyigbe**	10 June 2026	667,000
The Spelling Round; Gone to the Dogs; A Clever Round of Spelling Things Interestingly and Creatively / Acrostic; Big Wig or High Flyer; Stock Market; The Buzz Round (The Elderly) Sign-off: "Lie" Montgomery — "because I had a terrible time tonight and I wish you the worst."
8	"I Knew This Day Would Come"	John Safran, Tilly Oddy-Black, Will Gibb, **Demi Adejuyigbe**	17 June 2026	TBA
The Spelling Round; The Time Machine; Spell the Scariest Word; Feelings; Hackers; The Buzz Round (Death and Taxes) Sign-off: CSI Montgomery — "'cause some of that spelling was a crime scene."
9	"There's no C!"	**Colin Lane**, Anisa Nandaula, Tom Cashman, Demi Adejuyigbe	24 June 2026	669,000
The Spelling Round; Mixologist; Spell the Crew Member's Name; Spell the Smell; Blackjack; The Buzz Round (Sweet Treats) Sign-off: To Pimp A Butterfly Montgomery — "'cause that's a wrap!"
10	"I Wish I Could Sleep"	**Myf Warhurst**, Matt Okine, Bron Lewis, Colin Lane	1 July 2026	724,000
The Spelling Round; Down the Shops; Name This Racehorse; Spelldroid 3000; Spell the Audience Name; The Buzz Round (Furniture) Sign-off: Eye Montgomery — "because there's not a dry one in the house."

Winners in bold, dunces in italics.

=== Specials ===
No.	Guests	Original release date	Australian viewers (national)
1	Kitty Flanagan, Senator Briggs, Bronwyn Kuss, **Joel Creasey**	24 December 2025	N/A
The Spelling Round; The Gift of Spelling; Santa's Laugh; Christmas Carols; Yule Never Guess What Aaron is Cooking; The Buzz Round (Holly Jolly Christmas) Christmas special Sign-off: Christmas Mince Pie Montgomery — "because even if you don't like me, I'm gonna show up at your place!"
2	TBA	2026	TBD
TBA

== Reception ==
The premiere episode attracted an average overnight audience of 659,000 viewers nationally, winning the daily slot.

David Knox of TV Tonight gave the show three-and-a-half out of five stars.

Critic Giselle Au-Nhien Nguyen of The Guardian gave it a positive review (five out of five stars), describing the show as "an absolute d-e-l-i-g-h-t".

Montgomery won the Graham Kennedy Award for Most Popular New Talent at the 2025 Logie Awards for hosting the show.
