= Freddie Meredith =

English actor and comedian

- Education: Royal Academy of Dramatic Art (BA)
- Occupations: Actor; Comedian
- Years active: 2015–present
- Television: Such Brave Girls

Freddie Meredith is an English actor and comedian. His television credits include Such Brave Girls (2023–present). For his one-man show he was nominated for the Best Newcomer award at the 2026 Edinburgh Festival Fringe.

== Early life ==
Meredith grew up in West London and appeared in a school production of The Libertine.

== Career ==
Having trained at Royal Academy of Dramatic Art, graduating in 2015, and performed in theatre, Meredith's television credits include Channel 4 comedy drama series Big Boys (2022–2025). Meredith portrays the character Seb on Kat Sadler dark comedy Such Brave Girls from 2023. For the role he was nominated for Best Male Comedy Performance at the 2024 Royal Television Society Programme Awards. Meredith appeared in Channel 4 Comedy Blap pilot short comedy film Peaked (2024) created by Ada Player and Bron Waugh, which was nominated for Best Short at the 2025 British Academy Television Awards.

His television roles in 2026 included a part in Sam Campbell surreal comedy series Make That Movie for Channel 4, and Youth created by Sharon Horgan, for which he was also part of the writers room to flesh out the teenage son's character. In September 2026, he was announced to be joining the second series of SNL UK.

As well as acting, Meredith also moved into stand-up comedy and sketch comedy, including creating short-form sketches online. In August 2026, his one-man cringe comedy show Need a Light? was nominated for the best newcomer award at the Edinburgh Fringe Festival.

== Partial filmography ==
Year	Title	Role	Notes
2016	The Crown	Secretary	1 episode
2019	The Personal History of David Copperfield	Grainger	
2022–2025	Big Boys	Marcus	
2023	A Whole Lifetime with Jamie Demetriou		
2023–present	Such Brave Girls	Seb	Main cast
2025	Andor	BOS #2	3 episodes
2026	Make That Movie	Phillip Noonan	1 episode
2026	Youth	Freddie	3 episodes
2026–present	Saturday Night Live UK	Multiple roles	
