= Bella Hull =

English comedian and writer

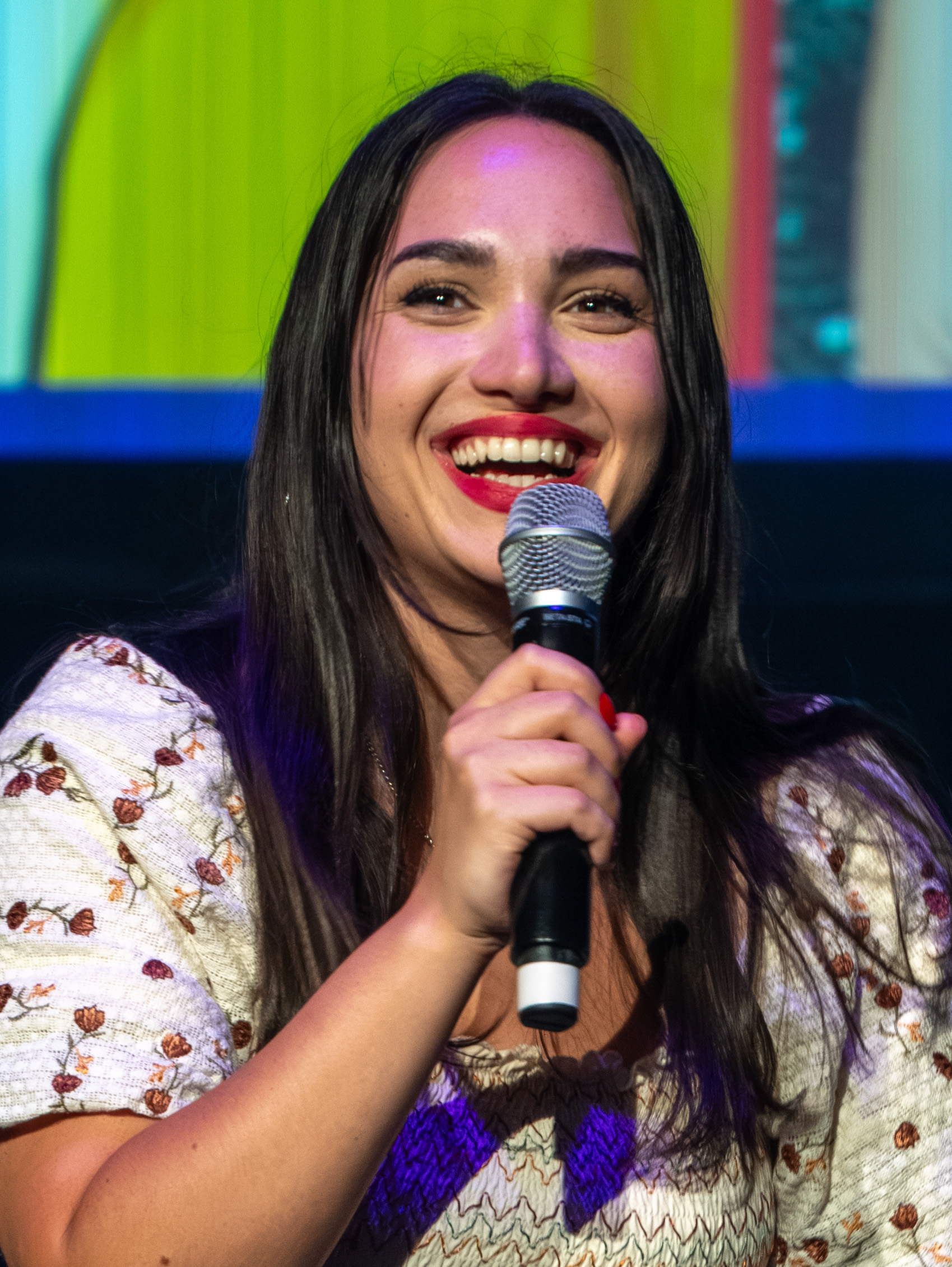
- Bella Hull at the 2025 Edinburgh Festival Fringe
- Education: Gonville and Caius College, Cambridge

Bella Hull is an English comedian and writer who has taken solo stand-up shows to the Edinburgh Festival Fringe, and made appearances on BBC and ITV television comedy shows.

== Early life ==
Hull grew up in London and spent some time in Henley during holidays, after her parents separated. Her father is Guyanese-Indian. She was educated at Notting Hill and Ealing High School. From 2016 to 2019 Hull studied History of Art at Gonville and Caius College, Cambridge, where she was a member of Footlights.

== Comedy career ==
Hull first performed at an open mic event at the age of 17, in a pub in London. She did some comedy while at university, and was on the Footlights committee in 2018–2019, alongside Ania Magliano, Leo Reich and others. She turned her attention to stand-up comedy in London after graduating. In 2019, Hull won the competition for the Yellow Comedy "young comedian of the year", and she continued doing some open mic work during the COVID-19 pandemic. In 2022, Hull took her show Babycakes to the Edinburgh Fringe for the first time. This later ran at the Soho Theatre.

In 2024, Hull took her show Piggie around the UK and then to the Edinburgh Fringe. Her 2025 Edinburgh Fringe show Doctors Hate Her won favourable reviews for its "sharp writing and precise performance". The Standard declared her show to be "hugely entertaining" with a "superb closing pay-off". One of her jokes was rated as one of the funniest of the 2025 fringe.

Hull has supported acts including Phil Wang and Russell Howard on tour, and has appeared on ITV2's The Stand-Up Sketch Show and on Stand Up for Live Comedy.

In November 2025 Hull made her debut on the long-running BBC television comedy show Have I Got News for You, with Richard Ayoade as host. In January 2026, Hull appeared on the BBC Radio 4 panel show You Heard It Here First, hosted by Chris McCausland.

In February 2026 Hull became one of 20 writers on new Sky sketch comedy show Saturday Night Live UK. She also serves as announcer and has made occasional cameo appearances during the programme.

She appeared again on Have I Got News for You in May 2026, as a last-minute replacement for Roisin Conaty, and in August 2026 took a new show Mad Cow Disease to the Edinburgh Fringe.
