= Larry Dean =

Larry Dean may refer to:

- Larry Dean (gridiron football) (born 1988), American gridiron football linebacker
- Larry Dean (comedian) (born 1989), Scottish stand-up comedian
