= Ayoade Bamgboye =

Nigerian and British comedian

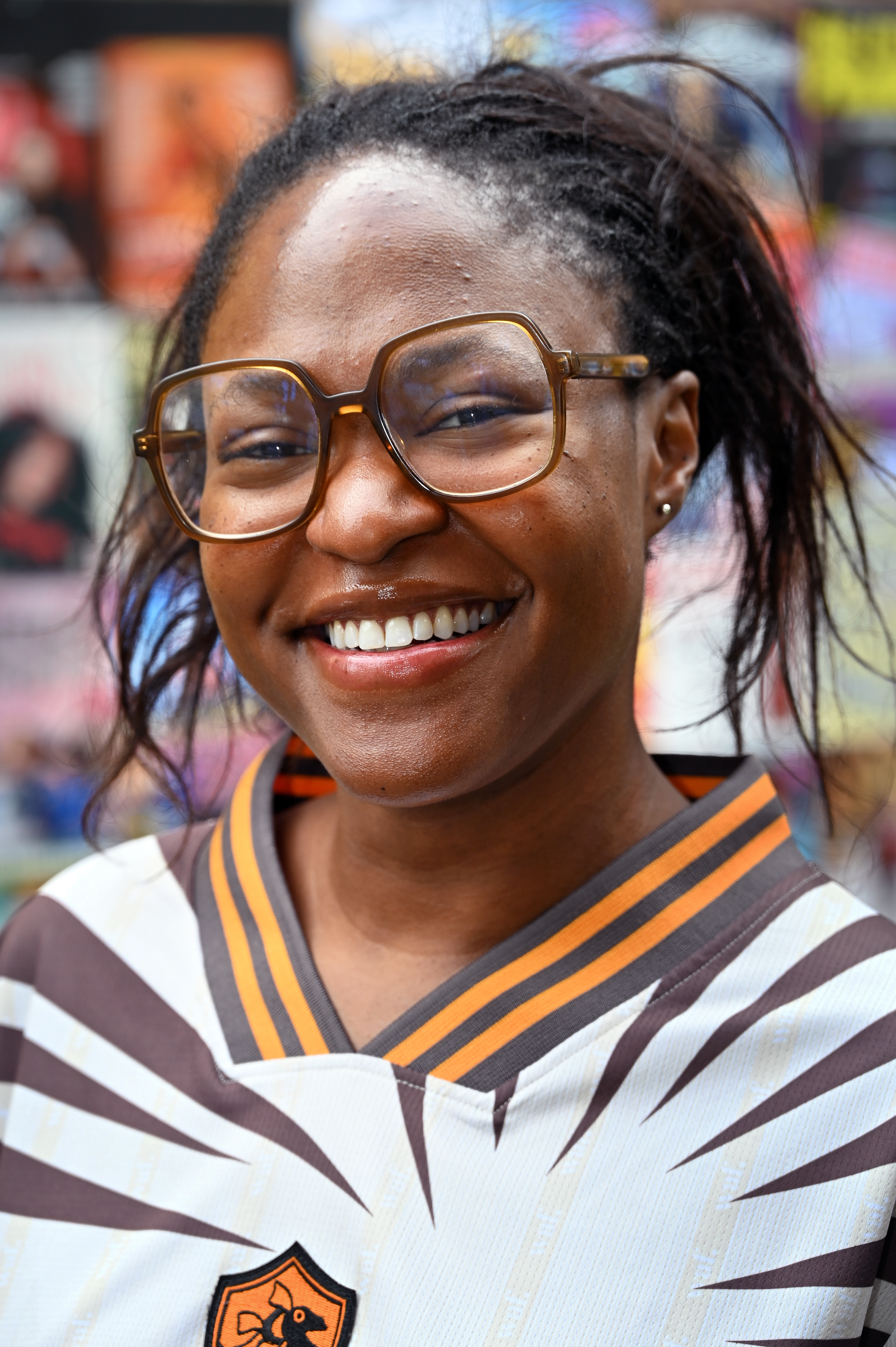
- Bamgboye in 2025
- Born: Ayoade Zahrah Bamgboye; 1993 or 1994 (age 32–33); London, United Kingdom
- Alma mater: King's College London

Ayoade Zahrah Bamgboye is a Nigerian and British comedian and actress. She won the Edinburgh Comedy Award for Best Newcomer in 2025. She is best known as a cast member of Saturday Night Live UK.

== Early life ==
Bamgboye was born in London and grew up in Lagos. She has a twin sister and a brother. She moved to London in her twenties, and still lives there. She explores the untimely death of her father in her debut show Swings and Roundabouts.

== Career ==
In May 2024, it was announced that Bamgboye would write and star in a Channel 4 Comedy Blap Rise and Shine with Channel 9.

At the 2025 Edinburgh Festival Fringe, Bamgboye's debut solo show Swings and Roundabouts was awarded The DLT Entertainment Best Newcomer at the Edinburgh Comedy Awards; she is the first Black woman to win the award. Swings and Roundabouts also won NextUp Comedy's 'Biggest Award in Comedy', and Bamgboye performed the show in a run at the Soho Theatre in October 2025.

Bamgboye names Jack Black, Maya Rudolph, and Chris Morris as her comedy influences. Bamgboye is part of the Saturday Night Live UK cast and wrote and peformed in the "Nigerian Wicked" sketch, alongside Cynthia Erivo. In 2026, she appeared on Make That Movie, a Channel 4 comedy created by Sam Campbell.

== Filmography ==
Year	Title	Role	Notes
2025	Mitchell and Webb Are Not Helping	Zoe	1 episode
2026	Make That Movie	Lawyer	1 episode
2026-present	Saturday Night Live UK	Multiple roles	
