= Make That Movie =

British television series

- Created by: Sam Campbell
- Written by: Sam Campbell; Joe Pelling
- Story by: Sam Campbell; Paddy Young
- Directed by: Joe Pelling
- Starring: Sam Campbell; Lara Ricote; Aaron Chen; Helen Bauer; David Hargreaves
- Country of origin: United Kingdom
- Original language: English
- No. of series: 1
- No. of episodes: 6

Production
- Executive producers: Sam Campbell; Joe Pelling; Adam Tandy; James Stevenson Bretton
- Producer: Will Kay
- Production company: Blink Industries

Original release
- Network: Channel 4
- Release: 28 May 2026 – present

Make that Movie is a British absurdist comedy mockumentary series created by and starring Sam Campbell. It was broadcast on Channel 4 from 28 May 2026.

== Premise ==
A film director uses ideas from people outside the industry to make feature films in a short window of time.

== Cast ==
=== Main cast ===
- Sam Campbell as a fictionalised version of himself, Sam Campbell
- Lara Ricote as Jess
- Aaron Chen as Sebastian
- Helen Bauer as Pat
- David Hargreaves as Winnie

=== Guest appearances ===
- Kath Hughes
- Amit Shah
- Freddie Meredith
- Kim Noble
- Ed Aczel
- Katie Norris
- Rob Auton
- Eric Rushton
- Lenny Rush
- Robert Bathurst
- Mark Silcox
- Luke McQueen
- Rose Matafeo
- John Kearns
- Debbie McGee
- Pat Sharp
- Amy Gledhill
- Mike Rice
- Ray Badran
- Asim Chaudry
- Ayoade Bamgboye
- Sarah Sherman

== Episodes ==
No.	Title	Directed by	Written by	Original release date
1	"Snake Switch"	Joe Pelling	Sam Campbell	28 May 2026
2	"Synthezoidian Elders"	Joe Pelling	Sam Campbell	28 May 2026
3	"Bog Prom"	Joe Pelling	Sam Campbell	4 June 2026
4	"Yooglet"	Joe Pelling	Sam Campbell & Joe Pelling	4 June 2026
5	"Naughty Naughty Secrets"	Joe Pelling	Sam Campbell & Joe Pelling	11 June 2026
6	"The Rescue Most Brave"	Joe Pelling	Sam Campbell	11 June 2026

== Production ==
Make that Movie was created by Sam Campbell, who also appears in the series, playing himself. The six-part series is directed by Joe Pelling and co-written with Pelling and Paddy Young. It is produced by Will Kay and comes from Blink Industries. Alongside Campbell, the lead cast is made up of Lara Ricote, Aaron Chen, Helen Bauer and David Hargreaves. The cast also includes Babak Ganjei and Katie Norris.

Campbell told Adam Buxton on The Adam Buxton Podcast, released in September 2024, that a pilot episode was filmed for Channel 4 starring Kim Noble. The series was in production the following year.

== Broadcast ==
The series debuted on Channel 4 on 28 May 2026, with all episodes available on the Channel 4 streaming platform from that date. In Australia, the full series premiered on HBO Max a day later, on 29 May 2026.

== Reception ==
Stuart Heritage in The Guardian awarded the series five stars saying there would "not be a funnier show made this year". The series received four stars in Chortle with Steve Bennett describing it as "distinctively idiosyncratic" with "bonkers gags crammed tightly into each quirky episode". Benji Wilson in The Daily Telegraph said that "innovation and risk-taking in TV should be lauded…it’s great that Channel 4 has seen fit to make Make That Movie at all... [and] it will surely become cult viewing", but awards the series three stars as "a vehicle for Campbell to bring his brand of deadpan dada to television" and that because "Campbell's shtick is incongruity, by definition... Make That Movie is all over the place".
