= Ayo Adenekan =

- Born: 2002 (age 23–24)
- Occupation: comedian
- Known for: Saturday Night Live UK

Ayo Adenekan is a Scottish comedian and writer who has performed solo shows at the Edinbrugh Fringe. He is currently a writer on Saturday Night Live UK.

== Career ==
In 2024, Adenekan came third place in So You Think You're Funny?

In 2025, he performed his debut hour Black Mediocrity at the Edinbrugh Fesival Fringe. He was a finalists in the BBC New Comedy Award.

In March 2026 Sky announced that Adenekan would be a writer on Saturday Night Live UK. He has made a variety of appearances in the background of sketches. He performed his show Homeland Insecurity at the Edinbrugh Fringe.

== Personal life ==
Adenekan is of Nigerian heritage with his family immigrating to Scotland in the 1990s. He is bisexual, with his show Homeland Insecurity exploring his experiences dating both women and men. He used to work at a pulled pork restaurant, something challenging for his Muslim parents. He has an older sister. He is dyspraxic.
