= Annabel Marlow =

British actor and singer

- Education: London Academy of Music and Dramatic Art; University of Leeds; The Royal Central School of Speech and Drama (M.A.)
- Occupations: Comedian, singer
- Years active: 2017–present
- Relatives: Toby Marlow (sibling)

Annabel Marlow is a British actress, comedian and singer, best known as a cast member on Saturday Night Live UK.

== Early life and education ==
Marlow was born to Helma and Andrew Marlow in Henley-on-Thames, and is of Jewish background. Marlow's father is a professional musician, her grandfather trained as an actor, and her great-grandmother taught speech and drama. She has two older siblings, including Toby Marlow, co-creator of the musical Six; Annabel portrayed Katherine Howard in the musical’s run at the Edinburgh Fringe in 2018.

Marlow attended Queen Anne's private boarding school until 2017, trained at London Academy of Music and Dramatic Art, studied at University of Leeds, and completed a Masters in Contemporary Acting at The Royal Central School of Speech and Drama.

== Career ==
She placed third at the 2023 Musical Comedy Awards, and that same year debuted at the Edinburgh Fringe with her show Annabel Marlow... Is This Okay?? In 2026, Marlow was announced as a cast member for the first series of Saturday Night Live UK.
