= Saturday Night Live UK =

British live sketch comedy variety show

- Genre: Political satire; Satire; Sketch comedy; Variety show
- Created by: Lorne Michaels
- Written by: Daran "Jonno" Johnson and Laura Claxton (head writers)
- Directed by: Liz Clare (s1 e1–5; s2); Richard Valentine (s1 e6–8)
- Starring: Hammed Animashaun; Ayoade Bamgboye; Larry Dean; Celeste Dring; George Fouracres; Ania Magliano; Annabel Marlow; Al Nash; Jack Shep; Emma Sidi; Paddy Young; Freddie Meredith
- Announcer: Bella Hull
- Theme music composer: Pauli Lovejoy
- Country of origin: United Kingdom
- Original language: English
- No. of series: 2
- No. of episodes: 14

Production
- Executive producer: Lorne Michaels
- Producer: James Longman
- Production locations: TC1, Television Centre, London
- Running time: 75 minutes (inc. advertisements)
- Production companies: Universal Television Alternative Studio UK; Broadway Video; SNL Studios

Original release
- Network: Sky One
- Release: 21 March 2026 – present

Related
- Saturday Night Live; Saturday Live

Saturday Night Live UK (SNL UK) is a British live sketch comedy variety show that premiered on Sky One on 21 March 2026. Created and executive produced by Lorne Michaels, it is a British adaptation of the original American version of the series, featuring an ensemble cast of sketch comedy performers, musical performances, and a special celebrity guest each week. The show's famous opening catchphrase, "Live from New York, it's Saturday Night!", was altered to "Live from London, it's Saturday Night!"

In May 2026, the show was renewed for a second series, which premiered on 12 September 2026. Split into two halves, it will resume on 16 January 2027.

== Cast ==
The full cast was confirmed on 4 February 2026. Meredith joined the cast on 7 September 2026, ahead of the second series.

- Hammed Animashaun
- Ayoade Bamgboye
- Larry Dean
- Celeste Dring
- George Fouracres
- Ania Magliano*
- Annabel Marlow
- Freddie Meredith (series 2)
- Al Nash
- Jack Shep
- Emma Sidi
- Paddy Young*

* denotes Weekend Update anchor

== Episodes ==
=== Series overview ===
Series	Episodes		Originally released		Average UK viewers (millions) (Note: Includes seven days of post-broadcast viewership.)
Series	Episodes		First released	Last released	Average UK viewers (millions)
1	8		21 March 2026	16 May 2026	0.39
2	12	6	12 September 2026	24 October 2026	TBA
2	12	6	16 January 2027	February 2027	TBA

=== Series 1 (2026) ===
No. overall	No. in series	Host	Musical guest	Original release date	UK viewers (millions)
1	1	Tina Fey	Wet Leg	21 March 2026	0.53
Wet Leg performs "Mangetout" and "Catch These Fists".; Nicola Coughlan, Michael Cera and Graham Norton appear in the opening monologue, with Coughlan also appearing in the "45 Seconds with Fouracres" sketch.; Kate Butch appears in the "Shakespeare's Wild Night Out” sketch.; Writer Bella Hull appears in the "The Budger" sketch.; Regé-Jean Page appears in the changing room sketch.; Hammed Animashaun, Ayoade Bamgboye, Larry Dean, Celeste Dring, George Fouracres, Ania Magliano, Annabel Marlow, Al Nash, Jack Shep, Emma Sidi and Paddy Young's first episode as cast members.; Ania Magliano and Paddy Young's first episode as Weekend Update anchors.
2	2	Jamie Dornan	Wolf Alice	28 March 2026	0.51
Wolf Alice performs "White Horses" and "Leaning Against the Wall".; Chris O'Dowd appears in the opening monologue.; Laura Daniel appears in the "British Themed Pub" sketch.
3	3	Riz Ahmed	Kasabian	4 April 2026	0.43
Kasabian performs "Great Pretender" and "Release the Pressure".
4	4	Jack Whitehall	Jorja Smith	11 April 2026	0.37
Jorja Smith performs "Little Things" and "Price of It All".; Writers Chris Cantrill and Kris Mochrie appear in the "DadSwap" sketch.; SNL UK performance director Tom Parry appears in the "Mastermind" sketch.
5	5	Nicola Coughlan	Foo Fighters	25 April 2026	0.38
Foo Fighters perform "Caught in the Echo" and "Child Actor".; Dave Grohl also appears in the opening monologue, and the 'plane landing' sketch.; Jimmy Fallon appears in the opening monologue, the 'film song' sketch and in Weekend Update.
6	6	Aimee Lou Wood	MEEK	2 May 2026	0.33
MEEK performs "Fabulous" and "Beautiful Freeks".; Writers Humphrey Ker, Chris Cantrill and Bella Hull appear in the "British Pork: It's Got the Lot" sketch.
7	7	Hannah Waddingham	Myles Smith	9 May 2026	0.38
Myles Smith performs "Stargazing" and "Hold Me in the Dark".; Peter Serafinowicz appears in the cold open, portraying Nigel Farage.
8	8	Ncuti Gatwa	Holly Humberstone	16 May 2026	0.21
Holly Humberstone performs "To Love Somebody" and "White Noise".; Aimee Lou Wood appears in the opening monologue.; Louis Theroux appears in the "Looking Theroux the Mirror" sketch.; Mr Blobby appears in the "Mr Blobby: Operation Grumthorpe" sketch.; Martin Lewis appears in Weekend Update.; Hammed Animashaun was absent from the live show this week due to a prior commitment, but did still appear in pre-recorded sketches.

=== Series 2 (2026–27) ===
A twelve-episode second series began on 12 September 2026, with six episodes scheduled to broadcast in 2026 and 2027 apiece. Airdates for the 2026 episodes were announced in August 2026. All cast from the first series returned, with the addition of Freddie Meredith announced in the week of premiere. 12 episodes are expected. Free studio audience tickets became available at 10 AM on Friday, August 14, via an online ticket ballot in a Microsoft Forms page.

The remaining six episodes will be shown in two three-week blocks from 16 January until 27 February 2027, with the ballot for tickets opening on 20 November 2026.

No. overall	No. in series	Host	Musical guest	Original release date	UK viewers (millions)
9	1	Jeff Goldblum	CMAT	12 September 2026	0.31
CMAT performs "Stay for Something" and "Euro-Country", and also appears in the opening monologue and the "45 Seconds with Fouracres" sketch.; Writers Ayo Adenekan and Lorna Rose Treen appear in the "Gregor J Dupont. Professional Baby" sketch.; Freddie Meredith's first episode as a cast member.
10	2	Jamie Demetriou	Royal Blood	19 September 2026	0.35
Royal Blood perform "Ten Over Ten" and "Figure It Out".; Ncuti Gatwa and writer Al Roberts appear in the opening monologue.; Roberts also appears alongside Demetriou in Weekend Update, reprising their roles from Stath Lets Flats.; Writer Chris Cantrill appears in "The E-Bike Song" sketch.
11	3	Amelia Dimoldenberg	Rachel Chinouriri	26 September 2026	0.28
Rachel Chinouriri performs "One Song Away from Crying" and "Never Need Me".; Writer Lorna Rose Treen appears in the "Night Shift at the Wax Museum" sketch.; Writer Humphrey Ker appears in the "Love Is Blind" sketch.
12	4	Danny Dyer	Sasha Keable	10 October 2026	0.27
Sasha Keable performs "Options" and "WHY".; Lisa McGrillis, Dyer's co-star from Rivals, appears in the opening monologue.; Writer Louis Waymouth appears in the "Tube Movie: The Trailer" sketch.; Weekend Update writer Ed Night appears during the segment.; This episode's broadcast overran by approximately seven minutes.
13	5	James Norton	The Streets	17 October 2026	0.26
The Streets perform "Fit but You Know It" and "Utopia".; Band member Mike Skinner also cameos in the 'Berlin 1840' sketch.; James Austin Johnson appears in the cold open as President Donald Trump; making him the first then-current cast member from the US series to make an appearance on the UK version.; A second appearance by Johnson, as Trump, during the 'fashion show' sketch was cut following dress rehearsal.; Performance director Tom Parry appears in the monologue.; Writer Bella Hull appears in the "James Norton's Smear Campaign" sketch.; Danny Dyer appears in a prelude to Weekend Update.
14	6	Cynthia Erivo	Blossoms	24 October 2026	N/A
Blossoms perform "Charlemagne" and "Joke About Divorce".; Writer Lorna Rose Treen and performance director Tom Parry appear in Weekend Update.; Headie One appears in the 'wedding rap' sketch.; Writer Al Roberts appears in the post-credits sketch.
15	7	TBA	TBA	16 January 2027	TBD
16	8	TBA	TBA	23 January 2027	TBD
17	9	TBA	TBA	30 January 2027	TBD
18	10	TBA	TBA	13 February 2027	TBD
19	11	TBA	TBA	20 February 2027	TBD
20	12	TBA	TBA	27 February 2027	TBD

== History ==
Sky, which has broadcast the original American Saturday Night Live since 2020 on linear channel Sky Comedy, was understood to be engaging in the "early stages of development" of a British version in December 2021. At the time, representatives from Saturday Night Live were "understood to be in London discussing the deal with Sky" (like NBC, also owned by Comcast), with comedians reportedly "lining up to be involved". In April 2025, it was confirmed Lorne Michaels would executive produce the show, to air on Sky Max and NOW at an undetermined date in 2026. A six-episode order was confirmed in May 2025, with the possibility of an extension depending on its popularity. On 20 March 2026, Sky announced a two episode extension of the series prior to the premiere, bringing the total episode order up to eight. Sky have stated that the programme is written in the week of each show and performed in front of a live studio audience. Similar to the original, it features an opening monologue, sketches, live music, and a British version of the news satire item Weekend Update.

The programme is a production of Broadway Video & SNL Studios in association with Universal Television Alternative Studio's UK production team. Lorne Michaels is credited for the role of show creator and main executive producer, as the programme was commissioned by Phil Edgar-Jones (executive director of unscripted originals at Sky) and Lisa Clark (commissioning executive at Sky) for Cecile Frot-Coutaz (CEO of Sky Studios, and Chief Content Officer for Sky). James Longman is lead producer, with Liz Clare as director and Daran "Jonno" Johnson as head writer. Several of these key figures visited the studios of the American version in November 2025. Edgar-Jones stated, speaking at the Edinburgh TV Festival in August 2025, said that "the American team have come over, to give structural advice, but they're very mindful this has to be a very British thing". Clare left as the show's director after the fifth episode, owing to prior commitments clashing with the episode order extension. Richard Valentine directed the final three episodes of the inaugural run.

On 7 May 2026, Sky renewed the show for a second series, set to consist of twelve episodes, for a September 2026 premiere. Clare returned as director for this series.

=== Casting and writing staff ===
The production staff began casting in mid-2025, with auditions taking place that summer. The writers' room was originally announced to be staffed by eighteen writers, which was confirmed as twenty in March, namely: Jonno Johnson (as head writer), Charlie Skelton (as Weekend Update head writer), Celya AB, Omar Badawy, Gráinne Maguire, Laura Claxton, Chris Cantrill, James Farmer, Humphrey Ker, Omodara Olatunji, Joseph Moore, Lorna Rose Treen, Hari Kanth, Louis Waymouth, Keith Akushie, Bella Hull, Ayo Adenekan, Nathan Foad, Al Roberts, and Ellie Fulcher. There were over 200 other members of crew, including Pauli Lovejoy serving as the musical director, Annie Hardinge as costume designer, and Kevin Fortune as the head of wigs, hair and make-up.

The cast and launch date for the series were confirmed on 4 February 2026. It was then revealed that members of the cast had visited the studios of the American version the previous week, during production of its thousandth episode. The cast and writers began workshopping in mid-February, and were trained by the American version's cue-card handler, Wally Feresten, to be readied for the usage of cue cards during the programme. The show used a test audience to establish the quality and worthiness-for-inclusion of sketches. A week prior to launch, Longman named Ania Magliano and Paddy Young as the Weekend Update anchors. As of the second episode, comedian Jamie Demetriou and writer James Graham have joined the programme as consultants; Demetriou was also involved in casting selection.

For the second series, Laura Claxton is now a co-head writer alongside Jonno Johnson. Freddie Meredith was also added to the cast, around two weeks before the series launch, having originally auditioned for the show prior to its first series.

== Production ==
The programme is broadcast from Television Centre, London, in studio TC1, with the BBC (via its commercial subsidiary BBC Studioworks) providing studios and post-production. According to Variety, the production budget for each episode is estimated to be £2 million.

Typically, around 30–35 sketches are developed for each live show, with eight making it through to final selection. Showrunner James Longman has spoken of regular contact with Lorne Michaels, his US counterpart, throughout the week leading up to each programme.

The hair and make-up team typically consists of fourteen to eighteen people, while the costume department has about six assistants. For the second series, Heather MecVean has joined the show as a costume designer, and Sinead Oldnall is director of onscreen talent.

== Broadcast ==
The eight-episode first series premiered on Sky One on 21 March 2026, with episodes also made available on the streaming service NOW. Viewers watching live through NOW briefly experienced a technical fault during the second episode monologue. Originally due to run for six consecutive weeks, the pre-launch extension allowed the series to undergo a one-week break following the fourth episode.

For the first series, the programme was sponsored by online marketplace eBay and its livestreaming option eBay Live, which ran bumpers throughout the broadcast, and, as part of social media promotion, oversaw a YouTube series featuring a stylist in collaboration with cast members, as well as having provided clothing worn by cast members. It also hosted events where users of the platform can bid on items from the show, including costume items and signed props, with proceeds to the Edinburgh Festival Fringe Society's discretionary 'Keep it Fringe Fund'. During the inaugural run, both eBay and British bakery chain Greggs ran competitions in which entrants could win tickets to one of the live shows.

In May 2026, a twelve-episode recommission was announced, with a second series due to premiere in September 2026 and run into early 2027. In August 2026, a premiere date of 12 September 2026 was announced, as was a broadcast pattern that would split the series into two halves; the first set of episodes for September and October 2026 and the second set in "early 2027". Tickets to attend recordings were changed to a ballot process, for which applications opened 14 August 2026. The second series featured a new sponsor, Sky Mobile.

=== International ===
Shortly after the UK premiere date was announced, it was confirmed that the Canadian streaming service Crave had acquired the series; it is also broadcast on CTV Comedy Channel. In March 2026, NBCUniversal-owned streaming service Peacock announced it would release episodes of the series in the United States one day after the UK airdate, at 9pm EDT, although it often becomes available sooner. In Australia, the series is made available on HBO Max on a two-day delay. In New Zealand, the show was made available on streaming platform NEON from series two, on a one-day delay. Select segments are available on the show's YouTube page.

== Reception ==
=== Critical response ===
While many were sceptical that the show would land with a UK audience, the reception to the premiere was mixed, with critics highlighting host Tina Fey's performance as positive. Lucy Mangan, writing for The Guardian, stated that the inaugural episode "did work", despite a "stilted" opening. Jason Zinoman of The New York Times opined that while Fey was a good choice for a first host, the show would need to differentiate itself from the original version of SNL. Jesse Hassenger of The A.V. Club described SNL UK as a "soft reset" for fans of the original show, writing, "It’s a chance for the series to feel [...] just a little more uncertain than its American counterpart, with a different set of cultural references and influences". Steve Bennett of Chortle praised the show, noting that it has given comedians a platform beyond the Edinburgh Fringe and social media that is not typically seen on television.

On the review aggregator website Rotten Tomatoes, 88% of 16 critics' reviews are positive. The website's consensus reads: "Without overthinking the formula, Saturday Night Live UK keeps things loose, confident, and more often funny than not, carving out a strong identity early on."

The opener to the second series also scored mixed critical reception. Nick Hilton, for The Independent, wrote that host Jeff Goldblum's limited acting range hindered the episode, and the sketches were "more miss than hit", with an "enjoyably edgy" Weekend Update that nonetheless experienced "stumbling" delivery. He expressed that the show "remains unpolished and squirreled away [...] unlikely to find the sort of audience necessary to make it a major talent factory for UK comedy". Michael Hogan, in The Telegraph, more pointedly described Goldblum as having "drained the humour" from his sketches, and contrasted him to musical guest CMAT's "charismatic and flamboyant performances". He isolated Emma Sidi as having "saved several flagging sketches by sheer force of comic personality", and that while the episode was "raw and uneven" and "patchy business as usual", it was still "thrillingly unpredictable with hilarious high points".

=== Viewership ===
==== Series 1 (2026) ====
The opening episode drew an audience of 226,000 watching on the night of broadcast, (Note: This number - the "overnight" - reflects viewers who watched it as it was broadcast and up to 2am, and will increase when catch-up viewership is added.) which fell 10% to 205,000 for the second episode. Both episodes were competitive with the major television channels in the slot, and considered an improvement on the viewership of Sky One's other original content as well as that of the original US version. After severe deterioration in the size of the overnight audience for the third and fourth episodes, overnight viewership improved week-on-week following the mid-run break, before the final episode registered a series low attributed to being broadcast opposite Eurovision. The series averaged 154,000 viewers and a 2.1% audience share across the run, significantly ahead of the 28,000 (0.4%) timeslot average.

Within seven days of broadcast, the launch's audience more-than-doubled to 528,000, also more-than-quadrupling the average audience of the slot at Sky One's initial closure in 2021; including repeat showings and "other viewing" - reportedly Sky's "preferred ratings measure" - the audience was 784,000. Viewership in this metric, however, also declined - by over a quarter of a million - by the fourth episode, and, in total, the run averaged 506,000 by this measure. It was noted that viewership of episodes via NOW was too low to register in online viewing reports. Despite the overall decline, viewership among younger viewers steadily increased, peaking with the sixth episode; factoring in repeats, it averaged 170,000 across the run. The series skewed heavily towards more affluent and professional (ABC1) viewers.

Deadline analysis shows that, as of April 2026, SNL UK clips have garnered over 86 million views across all official social media accounts. In August 2026, Sky claimed 206 million "organic views" across the first series, and that it reached over 3.2 million viewers over the course of the run, on both linear and video on-demand platforms.

Saturday Night Live UK series 1 viewership
Ep.	Broadcast date	Overnight	Audience share	7-day consolidated	7-day consolidated (inc. repeats)	28-day consolidated	Refs
1	21 March 2026	226,000	3.2%	528,000	784,000	627,000	
2	28 March 2026	205,000	3.2%	507,200	642,000	N/A	
3	4 April 2026	130,100	1.8%	430,600	631,000	470,000	
4	11 April 2026	120,000	1.6%	371,100	503,000	N/A	
5	25 April 2026	129,970	1.9%	377,000	N/A	N/A	
6	2 May 2026	143,730	1.9%	327,000	N/A	N/A	
7	9 May 2026	197,200	2.8%	380,000	N/A	N/A	
8	16 May 2026	86,420	0.9%	211,000	N/A	N/A	

==== Series 2 (2026–27) ====
The series premiere recorded an overnight viewership of 105,000, approximately half that of the series 1 launch audience. Factoring in repeats over the following days, on Sky Comedy and Sky1, saw the episode grow to 170,000. Subsequent episodes totalled - respectively - 188,000, 178,700, 179,300, at least 181,000, and at least 174,000 viewers; ABC1 viewers consistently comprised at least three-quarters of this audience (peaking with the sixth episode).

Saturday Night Live UK series 2 viewership
Ep.	Broadcast date	Overnight	Audience share	7-day consolidated	7-day consolidated (inc. repeats)	28-day consolidated	Refs
1	12 September 2026	105,000	1.4%	308,000	TBD	TBD	
2	19 September 2026	139,600	2.1%	353,000	TBD	TBD	
3	26 September 2026	120,300	2.0%	283,000	TBD	TBD	
4	10 October 2026	134,100 (Note: Also reported as approximately 143,000.)	2.0%	267,000	TBD	TBD	
5	17 October 2026	143,700 (Note: Also reported as approximately 152,000.)	2.2%	256,000	TBD	TBD	
6	25 October 2026	116,000	1.0%	TBD	TBD	TBD	

=== Accolades ===
The series was long-listed in the Best Comedy category at the 2026 National Television Awards. In August 2026, the first series won two awards at the Edinburgh TV Festival Awards for Best Comedy, as well as TV Moment of the Year for Jack Shep's Princess Diana impression. In November 2026, the series won The Television Award at that year's ZYN Rolling Stone UK Awards.

At the Edinburgh Festival Awards, Emma Sidi also received a nomination for Best TV Actor (Comedy). In October 2026, George Fouracres was nominated for Best Male Acting Performance in the 2026 RTS Midlands awards.

== See also ==
- Saturday Live (British TV programme)
