= Aaron Chen =

Australian comedian (born 1995/6)

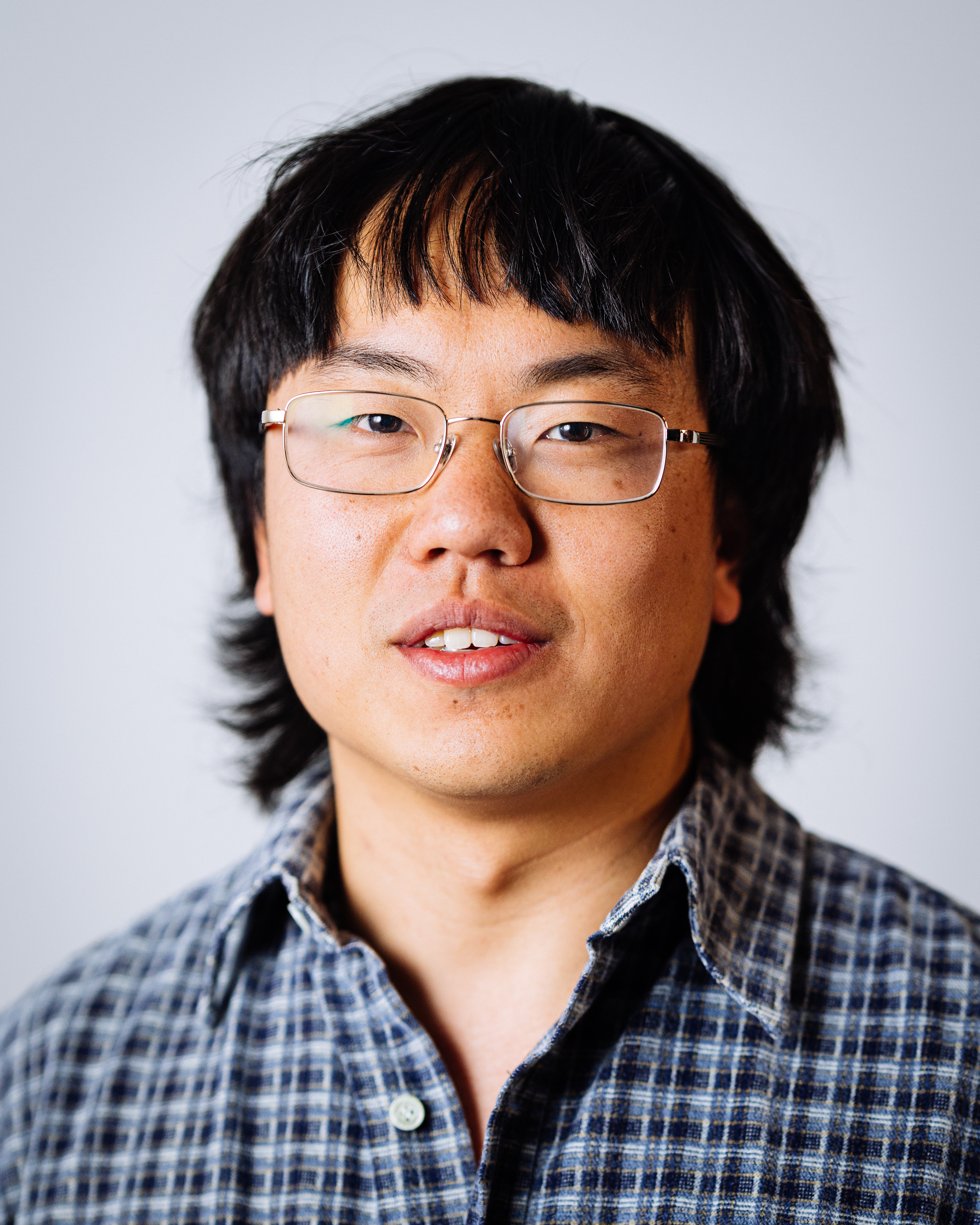
- Chen in May 2025
- Born: August 21, 1995 (age 31)
- Occupations: Comedian; actor
- Spouse: Esther Shim (m. 2023)

Comedy career
- Years active: 2011–present
- Medium: Stand-up; television

Aaron Chen (born August 21, 1995) is an Australian comedian and actor from Sydney. He became internationally known after appearing in the comedy series Fisk.

== Early life and education ==
Aaron Chen was born in 1995. His parents are Chinese. His father, Peter, was a sent-down youth in the Cultural Revolution. His mother died in 2000 from breast cancer.

He attended North Sydney Boys High, where he started performing stand-up comedy.

== Career ==
In 2012, aged 16, Chen won Melbourne International Comedy Festival's "Class Clowns", a national competition for high-school children, and after this started performing in pubs around Sydney.

In 2014 Chen appeared at the Melbourne Comedy Festival in its "Comedy Zone" section.

In 2017, Chen performed his debut solo show The Infinite Faces Of Chenny Baby, appearing at the Melbourne and Sydney Comedy Festivals and touring nationally, earning good reviews and selling out his shows and earning Best Newcomer awards at both. In the same year, he unintentionally caused controversy in the Australian soccer world by appearing as an unconventional interviewer at a football game, a friendly between English Premier League club Liverpool F.C. and Sydney F.C.

Chen appeared as the sidekick on ABC TV's short-lived TV series John Conway Tonight, filmed live at the Café Lounge, Surry Hills, Sydney, before taking over as host and completing production, with the show retooled and re-titled Aaron Chen Tonight (2017). He has performed at Splendour in the Grass music festival, and supported Ronny Chieng on his Australian tour as well as featuring in his 2017 ABC TV show, Ronny Chieng: International Student.

From 2021, Chen has played probate clerk and self-styled "webmaster", George, in Kitty Flanagan's ABC sitcom about a law firm, Fisk. After the series was sold to Netflix, debuting in August 2023, Chen gained fans in the US.

In 2022, Chen performed his show If Weren't Filmed, Nobody Would Believe at the Melbourne and Sydney Comedy Festivals, with a video of the show released on YouTube in September 2022.

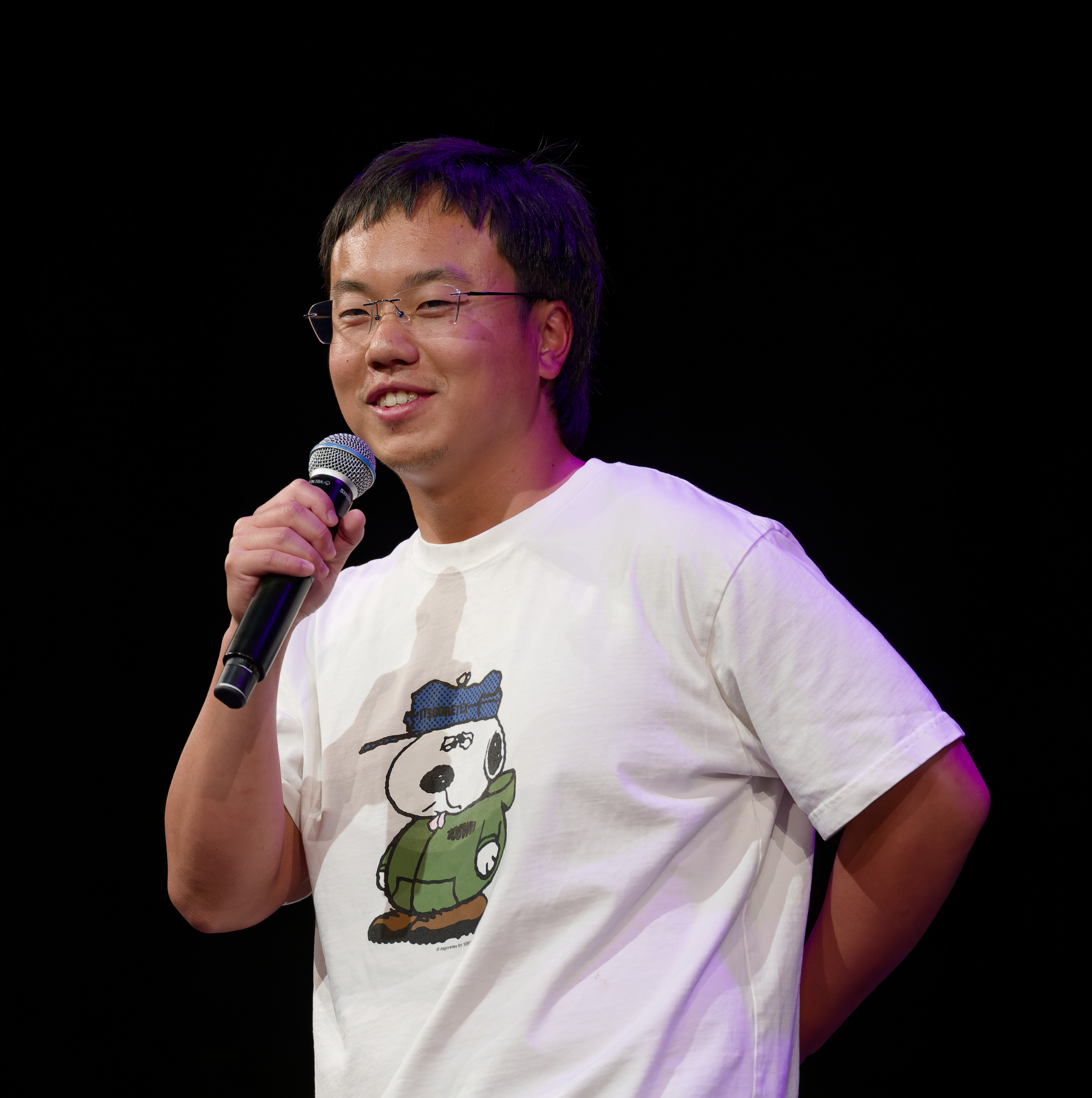
Chen performing at the 2024 Edinburgh Festival Fringe

In August 2024, Chen performed at the Edinburgh Festival Fringe, in a show titled "Funny Garden", which was well-reviewed.

In 2024 and 2025, Chen served as the assistant on the Australian version of Guy Montgomery's Guy Mont-Spelling Bee.

In late 2024, Chen was cast in his first feature film, The Dink, a comedy produced by Ben Stiller and scheduled to be released on Apple TV in July 2026. In it, he stars opposite Jake Johnson.

In 2025, Chen performed stand-up on Late Night with Seth Meyers, and in early 2026 toured the US supporting American comedian Ali Wong. He stars as Sebastian in the new British comedy series Make That Movie, led by Australian comedian Sam Campbell. The series was released on Channel Four on 28 May 2026.

=== Panel shows and other appearances ===
Chen has also performed on a number of panel shows on TV. In 2021 he appeared on the panel show Patriot Brains.

In 2024, he participated as a contestant on the third series of Taskmaster Australia, alongside Concetta Caristo, Mel Buttle, Peter Helliar, and Rhys Nicholson.

== Recognition and awards ==
- 2012: Winner, "Class Clowns" competition at Melbourne International Comedy Festival
- 2013: NSW representative at the National Grand Final, Raw Comedy
- 2016: Director's Choice Award
- 2017: Winner, Best Newcomer, Melbourne International Comedy Festival
- 2017: Winner, Best Newcomer, Sydney Comedy Festival
- 2021: Nominated, AACTA Award for Best Short Form Comedy, for his 2020 video A Life in Questions: Wisdom School with Aaron Chen, on Adult Swim in the U.S. (with Henry Stone and Joshua Duncan)
- 2021: Nominated, best show, Melbourne International Comedy Festival
- 2024: Winner, People's Choice Award at the Melbourne International Comedy Festival
- 2025: Winner, Logie award for Fisk, Silver Logie Best Lead Actor in a Comedy.
- 2026: Variety's 10 Comics to Watch for 2026

== Personal life ==
Chen proposed to Esther Shim in May 2022, announcing their engagement afterwards on Instagram. It was widely reported that the proposal was done at a McDonald's restaurant, however, Chen says that the photo of the wedding ring in a box of nuggets was taken a week after the engagement. The pair married on 19 November 2022.

Chen moved from Sydney to New York City in October 2023 on an alien of extraordinary ability visa.

== Filmography ==
=== Film ===
Title	Year	Role	Notes	Ref(s)
Shortcut to Becoming an Influencer	2018	Hunter	Short film	
Set Times	2022	Aiden	Short film	
The Dink	2026	PJ		

=== Television ===
Year	Title	Role	Notes	Ref(s)
2015	Dirty Bird	—N/a	Episode: "Labyrinth"	
2017	1800 Success	Aaron	3 episodes	
2017	Goscy's Classics	Whaler 1	Episode: "Ocean Girl"	
2017	Get Krack!n	Beach Man	Episode: "#1.2"	
2017	True Story with Hamish & Andy	Dacks	Episode: "Jack"	
2017	Ronny Chieng: International Student	Trojan Wong	Episode: "Clash! Ronny vs Instructions! Obey?"	
2018	Orange Is the New Brown	IT Guy / Zhu / Tony Chan	5 episodes	
2018	Very Small Business	Kim Park	8 episodes	
2018	Pls Like	Carl3k	Episode: "Most Views"	
2018	Pilot Week	McIntyre	Episode: "Drunk History"	
2020	Drunk History Australia	Cop / Fed Cop / Swimming Official	2 episodes	
2020	At Home Alone Together	Eugene	2 episodes	
2020	Stepmom Blues	Aaron	Episode: "6 - Finale"	
2021 present	Fisk	George	18 episodes	
2021	Rosehaven	Caller (voice)	Episode: "#5.4"	
2023	Love Me	Vincent	Episode: "Kämpa då"	
2023	Koala Man	Dennis (voice)	Episode: "Ode to a Koala Bear"	
2024	Fam Time	Menulog Guy	2 episodes	
2017	John Conway Tonight	Himself	3 episodes	
2017	Aaron Chen Tonight	Himself	6 episodes	
2019	Comedy Blaps	Himself	Episode: "Get Real Dude"	
2021 present	Have You Been Paying Attention?	Himself	12 episodes	
2023	Thank God You're Here	Himself	2 episodes	
2024	Taskmaster Australia	Himself	Season winner 10 episodes	
2024	Guy Montgomery's Guy Mont-Spelling Bee (Australia)	Himself	19 episodes	
2026	Make That Movie	Sebastian	6 episodes	
