= Project Slingshot =

Animal advocacy organisation founded in 2026

- Project Slingshot Inc.
- Formation: 2026
- Founder: Matthew Glover and Naomi Hallum
- Tax ID no.: 39-3915501
- Legal status: 501(c)(3) organisation
- Purpose: Animal advocacy
- Chief executive officer: Naomi Hallum
- Website: projectslingshot.com

Project Slingshot is an animal advocacy organisation founded in 2026 by Matthew Glover and Naomi Hallum. It campaigns against intensive animal farming and states that its long-term aim is to end factory farming by 2040. Its first major campaign opposed the use of high-concentration carbon dioxide to stun pigs before slaughter.

The organisation seeks to change public attitudes towards factory farming through advertising, investigations and public campaigns.

== Campaigns ==
=== Carbon dioxide stunning campaign ===
Project Slingshot's launch campaign focused on the use of high-concentration carbon dioxide to stun pigs before slaughter. The campaign, featuring the tagline Don't Buy It, included advertising across the London Underground network featuring public figures including comedian Diane Morgan. Project Slingshot argued that describing the method as humane was misleading and called for the practice to end, joining calls from other campaigners and organisations including the former Farm Animal Welfare Council.

In June 2026, the organisation projected footage of pigs undergoing carbon dioxide stunning onto several London landmarks, including the Palace of Westminster, Tate Modern and Tower Bridge. Zack Polanski, leader of the Green Party of England and Wales, attended the projection at Tate Modern and expressed support for ending the practice.

=== Campaign against fast-growing chickens ===
In July 2026, Project Slingshot joined the animal advocacy organisation Anima in a campaign calling on Pret A Manger to stop using fast-growing chicken breeds. Project Slingshot again used advertisements on the London Underground, this time to draw attention to welfare concerns associated with chickens bred for meat. The organisation was supported by comedians Sara Pascoe and Kerry Godliman, musician Paul McCartney and actor Joanna Lumley.

In August 2026, Project Slingshot launched The Chicken Quiz, a campaign video featuring comedians Jon Richardson, Sara Pascoe and Kerry Godliman and hosted by comedian Sam Campbell. The sketch was directed by Simon Amstell and focused on conditions experienced by chickens bred for meat, while also criticising claims made on chicken packaging. It formed part of a wider £3 million Don't Buy It campaign and was accompanied by further advertisements across the London Underground featuring Campbell, Richardson, Pascoe, Godliman and Chris Packham.

Project Slingshot said the campaign was intended to draw attention to welfare problems associated with fast-growing chickens and announced plans to increase its campaign investment to £15 million.

== Reception ==
Writing in Farmers Guardian, Chris Brayford criticised the campaign for portraying British farming in an unfairly negative light and argued that it overlooked producers maintaining higher welfare standards. He nevertheless wrote that the campaign highlighted the need for the farming industry to improve public engagement and transparency regarding animal welfare.

Writing in The Grocer, Mike Coppen-Gardner suggested that campaigns such as Project Slingshot represented a growing reputational challenge for the meat industry and discussed whether it faced a potential "tobacco moment."
