= Ben Gotting =

- Born: Ben Stephen Alwyn Gotting; 15 February 1981 (age 45) Dubai, UAE
- Height: 1.83 m (6 ft 0 in)
- Weight: 104 kg (229 lb; 16 st 5 lb)

Rugby union career
Senior career
Years	Team	Apps	(Points)
–	London Scottish		
–	London Wasps		
–	Worcester Warriors		

Ben Gotting (born 15 February 1981 in Dubai, UAE) is a former rugby union player, who represented London Scottish, London Wasps and Worcester Warriors. He has represented England U21, England Students and English Universities. His usual position is Hooker. He went to school at Court Moor School, Peterhouse Boys' School in Zimbabwe and Farnborough Sixth Form College, and attended Brunel University.

== Background ==
In 2002 Gotting was selected to represent England in the SANZAR U21 World Cup in South Africa. He was then de-selected.

After a successful final year at Brunel where he was part of the winning BUSA team, he was signed to the London Wasps on a full-time professional contract in 2003.

His Honours at Wasps include Parker Pen Challenge Cup Winner (2003) and Heineken Cup Winner (2004). Wasps also won a hat-trick of Guinness Premiership titles in 2003, 2004 and 2005 but Gotting only featured in one of these finals (2004). However, in this final he turned in a notable performance for Wasps; he came on as a replacement against Bath Rugby at half time. His line outs and all round play helped Wasps gain control en route to a memorable victory.

Gotting signed for Worcester Warriors from London Wasps in 2006 after agreeing a two-year deal with the club.

He married Laura Gotting in May 2008 and they have two children.
