= Al Nash =

British comedian, writer and actor

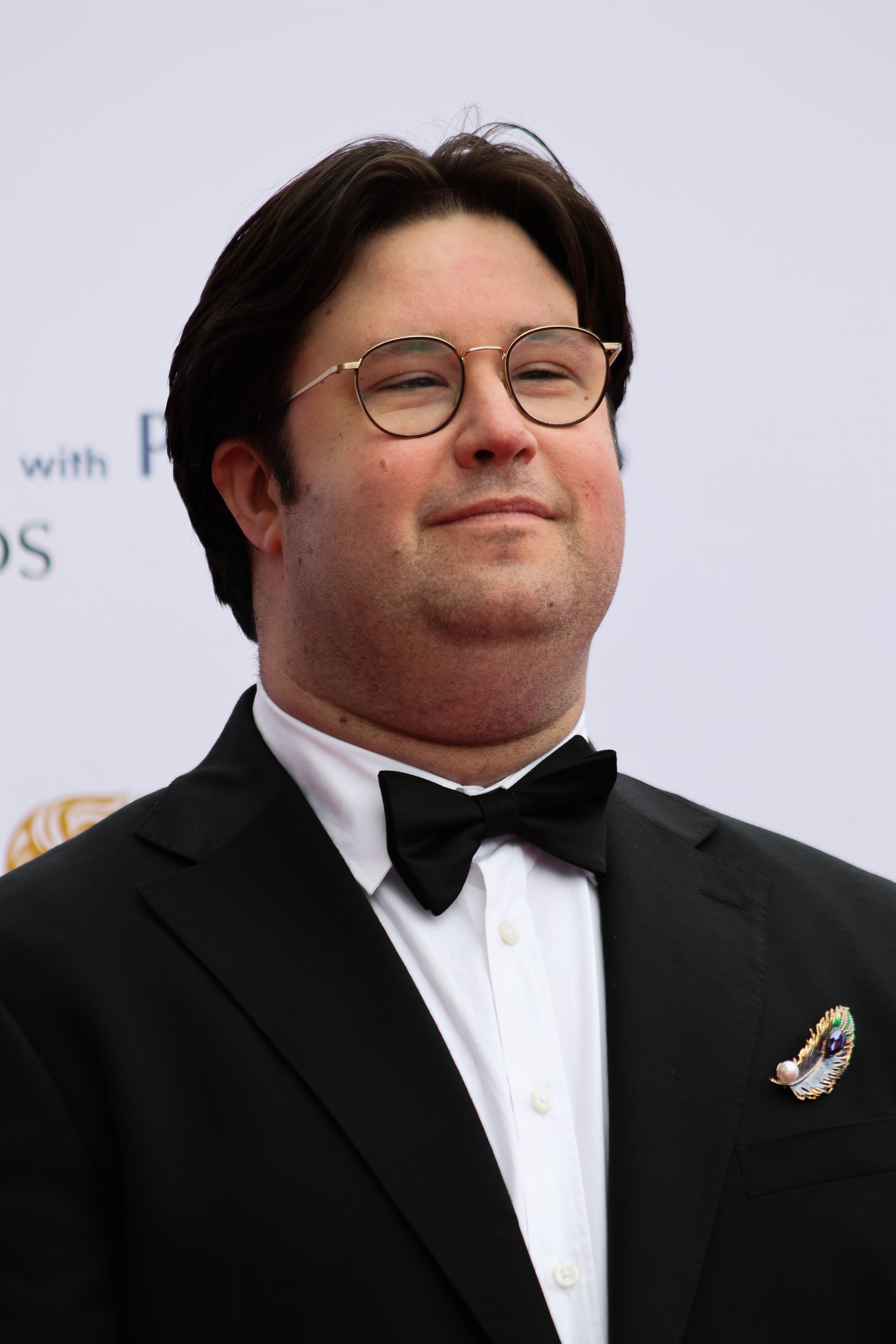
- Nash at the 2026 British Academy Television Awards
- Occupations: Comedian, actor

Al Nash is a British comedian, writer and actor. He is known for being a current cast member on Saturday Night Live UK.

== Early life and education ==
Nash was born in Little Chalfont. He studied at the University of Sussex where he founded and directed a sketch comedy group, Kids With Beards, that used to perform at the Edinburgh Fringe Festival. They disbanded in 2017.

== Career ==
Nash creates sketches on social media and has over 200k followers across Instagram and TikTok. He creates satire sketches often alongside Toby DB. He has produced content for brands including Premier Inn, Spotify and Strongbow.

Nash performs live on the London comedy circuit, hosting variety nights such as "Al Nash & Friends" at MOTH Club.

In 2026, Nash was cast in the first series of Saturday Night Live UK, a British adaptation of the American Saturday Night Live, featuring satirical sketches with an ensemble cast of sketch comics. He portrayed famous figures including Louis Theroux, Jeremy Clarkson in a Who Wants to be a Millionaire? parody and Harry Kane in the cold open of the third episode.

== Awards ==
Nash has been nominated for Chortle Awards and won a BBC Audio Drama Award for "Best Scripted Comedy (Sketch Show)" in 2023.
