= Court Moor School =

Coordinates: 51.271°N 0.846°W

Location
- Spring Woods; Fleet, Hants, GU52 7RY; England

Information
- Type: Community school
- Motto: Caring to Achieve
- Established: 11 May 1960
- Local authority: Hampshire
- Department for Education URN: 116412 Tables
- Ofsted: Reports
- Headteacher: Claudia Beattie
- Staff: 130
- Gender: Mixed
- Age: 11 to 16
- Enrolment: 1139
- Colours: Blue and Grey
- Website: http://www.court-moor.hants.sch.uk/

Court Moor School is one of two secondary schools in the town of Fleet, in Hampshire (UK) for pupils aged 11–16.

== History ==
The 15.7-acre (64,000 m^{2}) site for the school was purchased in 1957 for £3,810 by Hampshire County Council. Fleet Secondary Modern School, the earliest school in the town, moved onto the site in 1960 and reopened as Court Moor School on 11 May. At the time, the school had only one building, 500 students and 20 teachers. Court Moor became a comprehensive school in 1974 and is part of the Hart school district. The school's name derives from Dinorben Court, which used to be where Dinorben Close and Dinorben Avenue are now, and a moor that used to be adjacent to the estate.

The school is adjacent to the Basingstoke Canal and part of its site is designated a nature conservation area. The school gate is narrow because it was originally intended to be the trade entrance. Local residents were worried about the consequences of having the intended main gate opening onto their estate and it was never widened.

The Department for Education and Skills (DFES) recorded that in 2000 some 70% of all pupils leaving the school that year had attained five or more GCSE A*-C results, well above the national average of 49%. League tables for 2005 indicate that 76% of all pupils taking exams that year gained 5 or more A*-C results. The school was awarded Science College status in 2004. The school was inspected by OFSTED in 2009, where it received a rating of "outstanding" overall. The school was last inspected by OFSTED in 2013, where it received a rating of "good" overall.

== Court Moor's Student Council ==
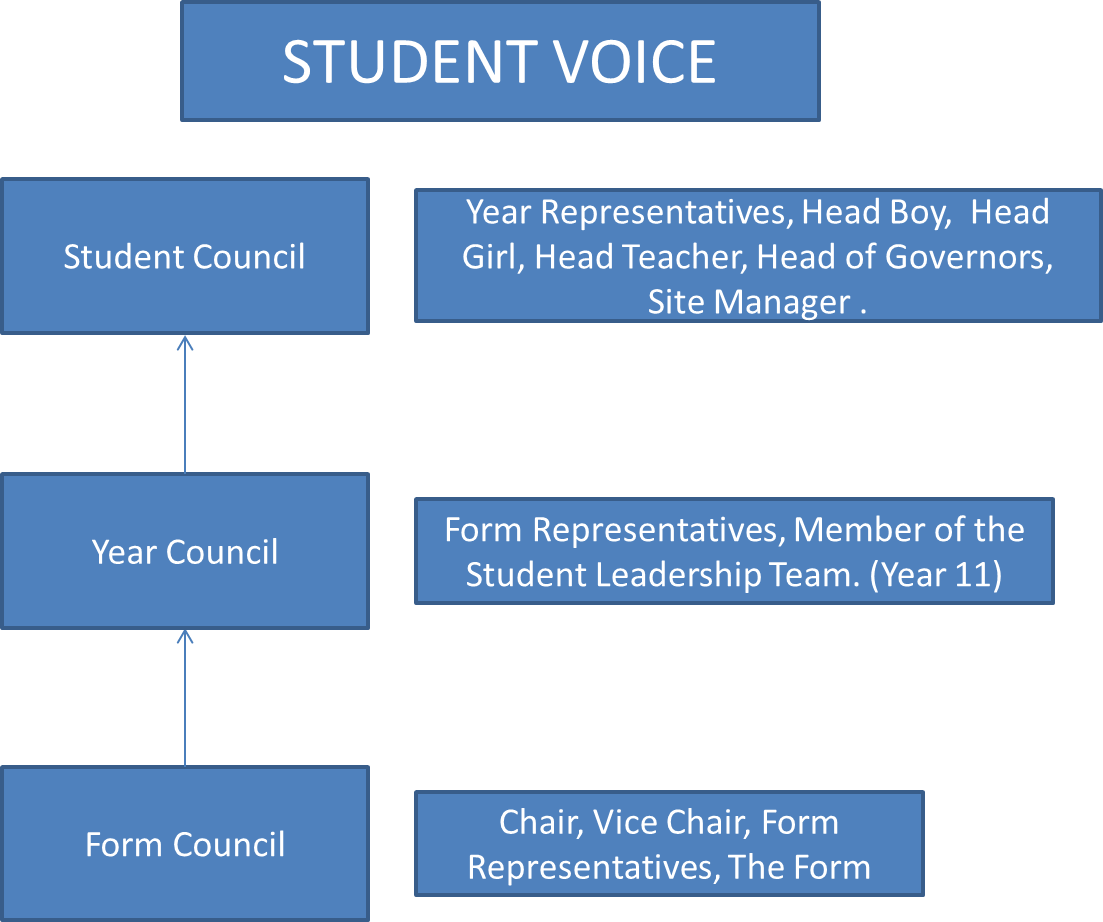
A visual breakdown of the Student Voice System

Court Moor's Student Council is made up of form representatives, year representatives, the head boy and the head girl. Student Council meetings are attended by two representatives from each year, the head boy, the head girl and the permanent teacher representatives - the head teacher, chairman of the governors and the site manager.

The Student Council Committee has planned and implemented projects such as the picnic bench shelters, funded by the schools PTA, and the schools newspaper (The CMS Newspaper).

In 2012 the Student Council entered the CMS Newspaper into the Speaker of the House of Commons's School Council Awards. Although not shortlisted, each school received the "We made a difference" web badge, that was on the school's website.

== Newspaper ==
The CMS Newspaper (Court Moor School Newspaper) was set up in 2012 by the Student Council. It successfully launched its first Issue on Thursday, 29 March. It has since been replaced with regular PowerPoints made in an after-school club.

== School Awards ==
Court Moor School has won several awards. These include: Fairtrade school status; 'A school using the Olympic Values' recognition; Science College status; The UNICEF Rights Respecting School Mark; The Arts Council of England's Arts Mark; An ICT School Mark and a Speakers School Council "We made a difference" recognition in 2012.

== Notable former pupils ==
- Helen Bauer, comedian
- Darren Campbell, former Reading FC midfielder
- Neil Etheridge, Cardiff City FC and Philippines goalkeeper
- Ben Gotting, rugby Player for London Scottish
- Keith Hooker, former Brentford FC midfielder
- Jason Pearce, Leeds United defender
- Isobel Pooley, international high-jumper
- Helen Reeves, British Olympic bronze medalist in kayaking 2004
- Elaine Vassie, Rugby Coach for Scottish Rugby Union

== See also ==
- Hart (district)
