= Rob Auton =

English stand-up comedian

- Born: 24 September 1982 (age 43); York, England
- Occupations: Stand-up comedian, writer, actor, poet, podcaster
- Writing career
- Years active: 2008–present
- Website: www.robauton.co.uk

Rob Auton is an English stand-up comedian, writer, actor, poet and podcaster. He is best known for his series of shows titled after and focusing on a specific subject. These shows have been performed at the Edinburgh Festival Fringe nearly every year since his debut in 2012.

== Career ==
Auton started performing live in 2008, before having his first hour-long show, The Yellow Show, at the Edinburgh Festival Fringe in 2012, as well as touring it around the UK in 2013. The show was later made into a short film as part of Channel 4's Random Acts series.

He is a member of Bang Said The Gun, a stand up poetry collective founded by Dan Cockrill and Martin Galton, who perform regularly in London and have featured poets such as Roger McGough, Andrew Motion and John Hegley.

In 2013, Auton won the Dave Funniest Joke of the Edinburgh Fringe Award for "I heard a rumour that Cadbury is bringing out an oriental chocolate bar. Could be a Chinese Wispa".

As part of the 2014 Glastonbury Festival, Auton was given the position of poet-in-residence.

Auton has performed stand-up on shows including The Russell Howard Hour and Stand Up Central, and made his acting debut in 2018 as part of the long-running TV series Cold Feet.

Auton is also a poet and illustrator, with his work having been published in a series of books by Burning Eye Books.

In 2020, Auton started a podcast titled The Rob Auton Daily Podcast, with a new episode posted every day during the year. It subsequently won the award for The Best Daily Podcast at the 2020 British Podcast Awards. The podcast returned for daily episodes in 2024.

== Selected work ==
=== Stand-up shows ===
Title	Year
The Yellow Show	2012
The Sky Show	2013
The Face Show	2014
The Water Show	2015
The Sleep Show	2016
The Hair Show	2017
The Talk Show	2018
The Time Show	2019
The Crowd Show	2021
The Rob Auton Show	2023
The Eyes Open and Shut Show	2024
Can	2025
Jupiter	2026

=== Books ===
Title	Publisher	Released	Notes
Bang Said The Gun: Mud Wrestling With Words	Burning Eye Books	2013	As part of the Bang Said The Gun collective
In Heaven The Onions Make You Laugh	Burning Eye Books	2013	
Petrol Honey	Burning Eye Books	2014	
Take Hair	Burning Eye Books	2017	
I Strongly Believe in Incredible Things	Mudlark (HarperCollins imprint)	2021	

=== Acting ===
Title	Year	Role
Cold Feet (episode 8.3)	2018	Poet
The End of the F***ing World (episode 2.6)	2019	Tommy
Miracle Workers (episode 2.4)	2019	Hank
Starstruck (episode 3.3)	2023	Brent
Marching Powder	2025	Skip
The Change (episode 2.3)	2025	Tattooist
Make That Movie (episode 1.1)	2026	Snake Wrangler
