= Pls Like =

BBC television mockumentary

- Created by: Olly Cambridge
- Written by: Liam Williams
- Directed by: Tom Kingsley
- Starring: Liam Williams
- Country of origin: United Kingdom
- Original language: English
- No. of series: 3
- No. of episodes: 18

Production
- Executive producers: Jenna Jones; Rupert Majendie; Liam Williams; Marigo Kehoe; James De Frond; Ben Caudell
- Production companies: Left Bank Pictures; Shiny Button Productions; Baby Cow Productions

Original release
- Network: BBC Three
- Release: 18 March 2017 – 24 January 2021

Pls Like is a BBC television satirical mockumentary, produced by Left Bank Pictures and screened on BBC Three online in 2017. A second series followed in 2018 and a third in 2021. The first series starred Liam Williams as himself, in a quest to be a successful YouTube vlogger.

Each series consists of six episodes each. Episodes length varies between 15 and 18 minutes.

== Cast ==
=== Main ===
- Liam Williams as Liam
- Tim Key as James Wirm
- Emma Sidi as Millipede "Millie"
  - Anya McKenna-Bruce as Mini Millipede
- Jon Pointing as Charlie South
- Arnab Chanda as Hen (series 2–3)
- Tom Stourton as DumpGhost (series 2–3)
- Shivani Thussu as Dina Discourse (series 2–3)
- Eleanor Nawal as Honeydew (series 3)
- Graham Dickson as Mungo Slate (series 3)

=== Recurring ===
- Ellie White as Polly Sprong (series 1–2)
- Hammed Animashaun as Johnny Jackson (series 1–2)
- Yuriko Kotani as Nozomi Hottah (series 1)
- Jordan Brookes as Apple (series 1)
- Grace Hogg-Robinson as Chelsea (series 2)
- Natasia Demetriou as Tingle Maid (series 2)
- Kieran Hodgson as Biel Agnew (series 2)
- George Fouracres as Henry Bloyd Smith (series 2)

=== Notable guest ===
- Lolly Adefope as Chloe Sass (series 1)
- Jamie Demetriou as Bombzy (series 1)
- Rose Matafeo as Laura Lauras (series 1)
- Aaron Chen as Carl3k (series 2)
- Mim Shaikh as Blair Shaikh (series 2)
- Liz Kingsman as Hannah (series 3)
- Duaa Karim as Sasha (series 3)
- Mark Silcox as Albert (series 3)
- Kemah Bob as Jo (series 3)
- Sam Campbell as Lesley (series 3)
- Mandeep Dhillon as Izzy (series 3)
- John Kearns as Rory Drum (series 3)

== Episodes ==
Series	Episodes	Originally released	
Series	Episodes	First released	Last released
1	6	11 February 2017	18 March 2017
2	6	25 September 2018	
3	6	24 January 2021	

=== Series 1 (2017) ===
No. overall	No. in series	Title	Original release date	U.K. viewers (millions)
1	1	"How To Become A Superstar Vlogger"	11 February 2017	N/A
2	2	"Fashion and Beauty"	18 February 2017	N/A
3	3	"Viral Music Video"	25 February 2017	N/A
4	4	"Health & Fitness"	4 March 2017	N/A
5	5	"Tech"	11 March 2017	N/A
6	6	"Humour"	18 March 2017	N/A

=== Series 2 (2018) ===
No. overall	No. in series	Title	Original release date	U.K. viewers (millions)
7	1	"The Hosts"	25 September 2018	N/A
8	2	"Social Change"	25 September 2018	N/A
9	3	"Most Views"	25 September 2018	N/A
10	4	"Kids"	25 September 2018	N/A
11	5	"Self-Care"	25 September 2018	N/A
12	6	"The Likeys"	25 September 2018	N/A

=== Series 3 (2021) ===
No. overall	No. in series	Title	Original release date	U.K. viewers (millions)
13	1	"Travel & Tourism"	24 January 2021	N/A
14	2	"Arts & Culture"	24 January 2021	N/A
15	3	"Sports & Fitness"	24 January 2021	N/A
16	4	"Food & Drink"	24 January 2021	N/A
17	5	"Home & Lifestyle"	24 January 2021	N/A
18	6	"Ethics"	24 January 2021	N/A

== Reception ==
Tristram Fane Saunders of The Daily Telegraph said the first series was "impeccably cast, sharply observed." Hannah J Davies of The Guardian said: "it puts a mirror up to the fads and controversies of the day, whether that’s ASMR or the alt-right, and explores their potential for laughs and pathos"

Pls Like was nominated for Best Short Form Programme at the 2018 British Academy Television Awards and was shortlisted for Best Digital Fiction Series at the Banff World Media Festival in Canada.
