= Emma Sidi =

British-American comedian and actress

- Sidi in 2026
- Born: Emma Francesca Sidi; February 1991 (age 35); United States
- Education: Emmanuel College, Cambridge
- Years active: 2011–present
- Spouse: Al Roberts
- Children: 1

Emma Francesca Sidi (/ˈsɪdiː/ SID-ee, born February 1991) is a British-American actress and comedian.

== Early life ==
Sidi was born to English parents in the United States. Her surname means "sir" in Arabic and comes via her Jewish grandfather. Her father Paul worked in banking and played rugby union for Harlequins. The family returned to the United Kingdom when Sidi was three years old and, after a career in the City, her father retrained as a physiotherapist in Chertsey, Surrey. Sidi was schooled at Guildford High School, a private girls' school in Guildford, before studying French and Spanish at Emmanuel College, Cambridge, which included studying abroad in Tuxtla Gutiérrez, Mexico.

== Career ==
In 2016, Sidi appeared in James Acaster's web series Sweet Home Lahnsteineringa alongside Jack Barry. The mockumentary received a £5,000 budget from crowdfunding and was filmed in Lahnstein, Germany.

=== Stand-up ===
Sidi was a finalist for the NATYS: New Act of the Year Show in 2016. Her solo shows have often included Sidi playing many different characters. Sidi's Edinburgh Festival Fringe show "Character Breakdown", in 2015, saw her play six different roles, including a feminist professor who delivers a lecture entirely in Spanish. Sidi's 2016 show, "Telenovela", included a Mexican soap opera and a European woman who dreams of a life as a TV presenter. In 2018 her show "Faces of Grace" included an American fresh from a bizarre blind date and a tearful wannabe Love Island contestant. There was also an aspiring nurse described as having "a clench-jawed Katharine Hepburn style drawl".

In 2024, she performed a one-woman parody Sue Gray show, Emma Sidi is Sue Gray, at the Edinburgh Fringe Festival before touring the show nationwide.

=== Television and radio ===
Sidi appeared in W1A and as Vlogger Millipede in the BAFTA-nominated Pls Like. Sidi's other television appearances include in Stath Lets Flats, Drunk History, King Gary, Ghosts and in Starstruck with her real life housemate Rose Matafeo. Sidi has also written and performed on The Now Show. In June 2020, during the COVID-19 pandemic, Sidi released La Princesa de Woking, a web pilot based on a character from her 2016 Edinburgh Festival Fringe show in which a Spanish-language soap opera is set in a British cul-de-sac. In July 2021, she appeared as Natalie, secretary to ex-prime minister Henry Tobin, on the BBC radio comedy Party's Over.

Sidi competed in the eighteenth series of Taskmaster with Andy Zaltzman, Babatunde Aléshé, Jack Dee and Rosie Jones. She won four episodes, finishing third overall behind Zaltzman and Dee.

In February 2026, Sidi was announced as part of the inaugural Saturday Night Live UK cast.

== Personal life ==
Sidi was a member of the Cambridge Footlights. She is married to actor and comedian Al Roberts, also her on-screen husband in the TV series Starstruck. The couple have a son born 2025.

== Filmography ==
=== Film ===
| Year | Title | Role | Notes |
|---|---|---|---|
| 2011 | The Pickle | Barbara | Short film |
| 2014 | Gregor | Ellen | |
| 2015 | Pillow Talk | Liv | Short films |
| 2019 | Quiet Carriage | Misha | Short films |
| 2019 | Whippersnap | Maxine | Short films |
| 2020 | La Princesa de Woking | Becky Hello | Short films |
| 2022 | My First Dick | Hannah Bills | Short films |
| 2024 | Goblin Solutions | Zoe | Short films |
| 2024 | Paddington in Peru | Elderly Resident Bear #3 (voice) | |
| 2025 | The Running Man | Adriané Americano | |
| TBA | A Matter of Time † | TBA | Filming |

=== Television ===
| Year | Title | Role | Notes |
|---|---|---|---|
| 2016 | Dave Talks | Dr. Beatriz Carranza | Series 1, episode 3: "Dance Your Destiny" |
| 2016 | Year Friends | Doctor Emma | Series 1, episode 7: "July" |
| 2017 | Drunk History | Local Woman | Series 3, episodes 2 & 5 |
| 2017 | Hospital People | Helena's aide | Series 1, episode 5: "The New Ward" |
| 2017 | Summer Comedy Shorts | Herself | Mini-series, episode 7: "Emma Sidi's Summer: Last Resort". Also writer |
| 2017 | W1A | Zoe | Series 3, episodes 2, 3 & 6 |
| 2017–2018 | Climaxed | Sian | Series 1, episodes 2 & 6; series 2, episodes 1 & 6 |
| 2017–2020 | Curious Under the Stars | Diane | Series 3–10 (34 episodes) |
| 2017–2021 | Pls Like | Millipede | Series 1–3 (16 episodes) |
| 2018 | News Crack | Various | Television film |
| 2019 | Stath Lets Flats | Esme | Series 2, episode 5: "A Stressfully Date" |
| 2020 | Industry | Amy | Series 1, episode 1: "Induction" |
| 2020–2021 | King Gary | Anne | Series 1 & 2 (4 episodes) |
| 2021 | Black Death | Spirit | Mini-series, episode 1: "The Humble Fisherman" |
| 2021–2023 | Ghosts | Eleanor | Series 3, episode 5: "Something to Share?"; series 5, episode 3: "Pineapple Day" |
| 2021–2023 | Starstruck | Kate | Series 1–3 (17 episodes) |
| 2022 | Don't Hug Me I'm Scared | Bubble Bath Memory (voice) | Series 1, episode 4: "Friendship" |
| 2022 | Prince Andrew: The Musical | Emily Maitlis | TV special |
| 2022 | Red Flag | Various | Mini-series |
| 2023 | Extraordinary | Woman with kid | 1 episode |
| 2023 | Black Ops | Marsh Ranger | Series 1, episodes 2 & 3 |
| 2023 | A Whole Lifetime with Jamie Demetriou | Faye | Series 1, episode 1 |
| 2024 | Death in Paradise | Amelia Templeton | Series 13, episode 7 |
| 2024 | Richard Osman's House of Games | Herself - Contestant | Series 8, episodes 21–25 (week 5) |
| 2024 | Taskmaster | Herself - Contestant | Series 18, episodes 1–10 |
| 2024 | Christmas University Challenge | Herself - Contestant | Series 14, episode 6: "Emmanuel College, Cambridge v Queens' College, Cambridge" |
| 2024-present | We Might Regret This | Olivia | Supporting character, 2 series |
| 2025 | Brian and Maggie | Sue Richardson | Episodes 1 & 2 |
| 2025 | Big Boys | Charity Shop Prue | Series 3, episode 3: "Thin Lips, Fat Lines & a Poem on Princess Di" |
| 2026 | Saturday Night Live UK | Various | Main cast |
