= Ed Night =

British comedian

- Night in 2026
- Born: England
- Occupations: Comedian, actor, writer
- Notable work: Anthem for Doomed Youth; Your Old Mucker; We'll Be Alright, Darling

Comedy career
- Years active: 2014–present
- Medium: Stand-up, television, radio

Ed Night is a British stand-up comedian, writer and actor. He was nominated for Best Newcomer at the Edinburgh Comedy Awards in 2017 for his debut show Anthem For Doomed Youth. His comedy has been noted for its observational style, literary references and social commentary.

== Early life ==
Night is the son of comedian Kevin Day. He began performing stand-up comedy in 2014 and reached the final of the So You Think You're Funny competition in 2015.

== Career ==
Night's debut Edinburgh Fringe show, Anthem For Doomed Youth, was performed in 2017 and led to a nomination for the Edinburgh Comedy Award for Best Newcomer. That same year he was nominated for Leicester Mercury Comedian of the Year.

His second Edinburgh show, An Aesthetic, sold out its Fringe run in 2018 and later transferred to the Melbourne International Comedy Festival. Reviewing the show at Soho Theatre, Brian Logan of The Guardian described Night as "a rising star".

Night returned to the Edinburgh Fringe in 2019 with Jokes of Love and Hate, which received positive reviews from The Scotsman and The Times. In a review for The i Paper, his work was described as "clever social commentary".

During the late 2010s and early 2020s, Night also worked as a television and radio writer and performer. His credits included writing for The Mash Report and appearances on Roast Battle, Zen Motoring, Complaints Welcome and The Stand Up Sketch Show.

After a five-year absence from the Edinburgh Fringe, Night returned in 2024 with the show The Plunge. His 2025 show Your Old Mucker received widespread critical attention and was nominated for the Edinburgh Comedy Award for Best Show. Reviewing the production, The Guardian described the show as "sharply observed", while Chortle praised its mixture of intellectual and observational humour.

Alongside his stand-up work, Night developed an online audience through comedy sketches and social media collaborations with comedian Paddy Young. Writing in The Skinny, Louis Cammell described the pair's sketches as "fairly ubiquitous faces on Instagram", noting their popularity online and their use of edited character-based comedy. In an interview with The Sunday Post, Night said that his online sketches had "gone viral" and discussed the pressures of maintaining a social media presence alongside live stand-up performance.

In 2026, Night released his debut stand-up special Hour Long Clip through 800 Pound Gorilla Media, and returned to the Edinburgh Fringe with his show We'll Be Alright, Darling.

== Style and influences ==
Critics have described Night's comedy as combining conversational delivery with literary and political references. His material frequently addresses generational politics and contemporary British life. In a 2024 interview with Chortle, Night cited Caroline Aherne as a major influence on his work.
