= Larry Dean (comedian) =

Scottish stand-up comedian (born 1989)

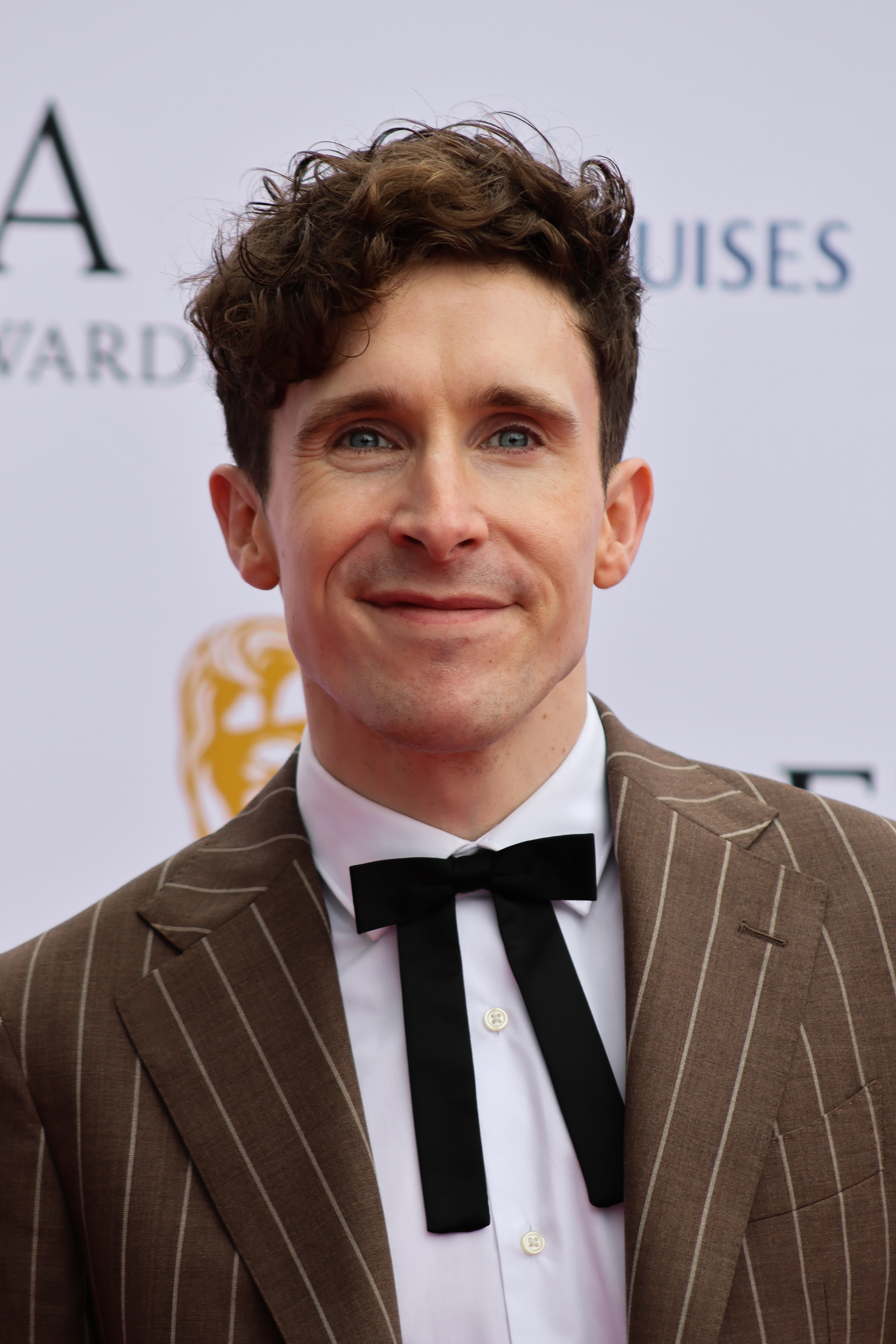
- Dean in 2026
- Born: 13 December 1989 (age 36); Glasgow, Scotland
- Education: Southampton Solent University
- Spouse: Mikey Crump (m. 2025)

Comedy career
- Years active: 2010–present
- Medium: Stand-up comedy
- Genres: Observational comedy, physical comedy, blue comedy, surreal humour, impressionism
- Subjects: Scottish culture, homosexuality, relationships, family, sex
- Website: www.larrydeancomedy.com

Larry Dean (born 13 December 1989) is a Scottish stand-up comedian and actor. He won Scottish Comedian of the Year in 2013.

== Early life ==
Dean grew up in the South Side of Glasgow. He was raised in a Catholic family and attended Belmont House School, a private secondary school in Glasgow.

Dean started his stand-up career in 2010 whilst he was a student at Southampton Solent University.

== Career ==
In 2011, Dean performed alongside Ric Wharton and Chris Munro in the show One Threw Up in the Cuckoo's Nest at the Edinburgh Festival Fringe. Dean's show Out Now told the story of coming out to a strict Catholic family. Dean's 2016 show, Farcissist was about his life after coming out, his long-term relationship, and re-adjusting to the dating scene.

Dean's 2017 show, Fandan, was loosely wrapped around the central story of sitting in a café with two murderers. It was rated 6th Best Reviewed Show of the Edinburgh Festival Fringe shows in 2017 by British Comedy Guide. In 2017, Dean appeared on Live at the Apollo with Gary Delaney; Comedy Central UK's Roast Battle against Sofie Hagen. In 2018, he appeared on BBC's Mock the Week. In 2019, he was on Michael McIntyre's Big Show and had another appearance on Roast Battle Season 3, Episode 1 against Tom Allen.

Dean's 2024 show Dodger discussed his experiences of having a grandmother with dementia as well as his recent autism diagnosis. In 2025, Dean guest-starred in the television series Gifted as the Gameshow Host. In February 2026, Dean was announced as part of the Saturday Night Live UK cast.

== Awards ==
Year	Status	Award	Body	Show	Ref
2013	Winner	Scottish Comedian of the Year			
2013	Winner	New Act of the Year	Bath Comedy Festival		
2015	Shortlisted	Edinburgh Comedy Award (Best Newcomer)		Out Now	
2016	Winner	Amused Moose Comedy Award	Edinburgh Festival	Farcissist	
2018	Shortlisted	Best Show Award		Bampot	
2022	Shortlisted	Best Show Award		Fudnut	

== Live Performance ==
Year	Title	Venue	Festival	Notes	Ref
2011	One Threw Up in the Cuckoo's Nest	Laughing Horse	Edinburgh Festival Fringe	With Ric Wharton and Chris Munro	
2012	Its Not Us, It's You	The Free Sisters	Edinburgh Festival Fringe	With James Alderson	
2013	Unmanageable	The Free Sisters	Edinburgh Festival Fringe	With Kim Hope	
2013	Sexual Freaky Friday	The Meadow Bar	Edinburgh Festival Fringe	With Christian Elderfield	
2013	Cougar Pammy And Her Puppies	The Counting House	Edinburgh Festival Fringe	Cabaret	
2014	Larry Dean: Scottish Comedian of the Year 2013	The Beehive Inn	Edinburgh Festival Fringe		
2014	AAA Stand-Up	Pleasance Courtyard	Edinburgh Festival Fringe	With James Bran and Sunna Jarman	
2015	Larry Dean: Out Now!	Pleasance Courtyard	Edinburgh Festival Fringe		
2016	Larry Dean: Farcissist	Pleasance Courtyard	Edinburgh Festival Fringe		
2017	Larry Dean: Fandan	Monkey Barrel	Edinburgh Festival Fringe		
2019	Larry Dean: Fandan	Assembly Hall	Edinburgh Festival Fringe	One night	
2018	Larry Dean: Bampot	Assembly Checkpoint	Edinburgh Festival Fringe		
2019	Larry Dean: Bampot	Assembly Hall	Edinburgh Festival Fringe	On night	
2018	Comic Relief Live	Assembly Hall	Edinburgh Festival Fringe	Cabaret	
2019			Greenwich Comedy Festival (London)		
2020			Glasgow International Comedy Festival		
2020			Wells Comedy Festival		
2021			Cambridge Comedy Festival		
2021			Leeds Comedy Festival		
2021			Country Mile Comedy Festival (London)		
2021	Larry Dean: Work In Progress	Monkey Barrel	Edinburgh Festival Fringe		
2021	Larry Dean: Special Recording Warm-Up	Monkey Barrel	Edinburgh Festival Fringe		
2021			Fringe By The Sea (North Berwick)		
2021			Women in Comedy Festival (Manchester)		
2021			Newcastle Comedy Weekender		
2022	Larry Dean: Fudnut	Monkey Barrel	Edinburgh Festival Fringe		
2022			Glasgow International Comedy Festival		
2022			Leith Comedy Festival		
2023			ARG Com Fest (London)		
2023	Larry Dean: Work in Progress	The Hive, Monkey Barrel	Edinburgh Festival Fringe		
2023			Winchester Comedy Festival		
2024			Leicester Comedy Festival		
2024			South London Previews Festival		
2024			ARG Com Fest (London)		
2024			The Bush Comedy Festival (London)		
2024			Creatures Comedy Festival (Manchester)		
2024			Aberystwyth Comedy Festival		
2024	Larry Dean: Dodger	Monkey Barrel	Edinburgh Festival Fringe		
2024	Larry Dean: Dodger	UK Tour			
2025	Larry Dean: Dodger	Assembly Rooms	Edinburgh Festival Fringe	2 nights	
2025			Glasgow International Comedy Festival		
2025			Creatures Comedy Festival (Manchester)		
2025			Comedy At The Castle (Warwick)		
2025	Larry Dean: Work in Progress	Monkey Barrel	Edinburgh Festival Fringe		
2026			A Lovely Weekend (Manchester)		
2026			Bristol Comedy Garden		
2026			Comedy At The Castle (Lancaster)		
2026			DEADMEET (Tabley)		
2026	Stand Up For Freedom	Underbelly	Edinburgh Festival Fringe	Cabaret	
2026	Larry Dean: Hellbent	Pleasance Courtyard			
2026	Larry Dean: Hellbent	UK tour			
2026			Aberdeen Comedy Festival		
2026			Harrogate Comedy Festival		
2026			Brighton Dome Comedy Festival		

== Filmography ==
=== Television ===
Year	Title	Role	Other role	Channel	Notes	Ref
2016	Live From The BBC	Self		BBC Three	Series 1, Episode 4	
	@elevenish	Ensemble actor		ITV2	Episode 1, Special: "The Bestish Bits	
	Comedy Central At The Comedy Store	Guest		Comedy Central	Series 4, Episode 1	
2017	Live At The Apollo	Guest		BBC Two	Series 13, Episode 1	
2019	Live At The Apollo	Guest		BBC Two	Pride Specials: Episode 1	
2021	Live At The Apollo	Host		BBC Two	Series 16, Episode 4	
2018	Michael McIntyre's Big Show	Guest		BBC One	Series 4, Episode 6	
2018	Whiplashed	Host		BBC Two Scotland		
2018	Roast Battle	Self		Comedy Central	Series 1, Episode 4	
2019	Roast Battle	Self		Comedy Central	Series 3, Episode 1	
2018	Mock The Week	Guest		BBC Two	Series 17, Episode 10, Highlights Special, Christmas Special	
2019	Mock The Week	Guest		BBC Two	Series 18, Episode 5, Compilation Special, Christmas Special	
2022	Mock The Week	Guest		BBC Two	Series 21, Special: "The History Of... Part 2	
2019	Susan Calman's Fringe Benefits	Guest		BBC Scotland	Series 1, Episode 1	
2020	Fern Brady Goes Viral!	Self		BBC Scotland	Episode 1	
2020	Guessable?	Guest		Comedy Central	Series 1, Episode 8	
2021	Rob Beckett's Undeniable	Guest		Comedy Central	Episode 5	
2021	The Stand Up Sketch Show	Self		ITV2	Series 3, Episodes 3, 5	
2021	The Stand Up Sketch Show	Ensemble actor		ITV2	Series 3, Episodes 1, 4	
2022	The Stand Up Sketch Show	Self		ITV2	Series 4, Episodes 2, 4	
2022	The Stand Up Sketch Show	Ensemble actor		ITV2	Series 4, Episodes 2, 7	
2021	BBC New Comedy Awards	Host		BBC One	Episode 5: "Dundee"	
2023	BBC New Comedy Awards	Host		BBC One	Episode 2: "Leith"	
2024	BBC New Comedy Awards	Host		BBC One	Episode 5: "Scotland Heat: Paisley"	
2023	The Comedy Roast For SU2C			Channel 4		
2023	Larry Dean: Fandan	Actor	Writer	Channel 4		
2025	QI	Guest		BBC Two	Series W, Episode 6, Specials QI VG: Parts I and II	
2026	Saturday Night Live UK	Various		Sky One	14 episodes	

== Audiography ==
=== Radio ===
Year	Title	Role	Station	Notes	Ref
2014	MacAulay And Co - Edinburgh 2014	Self	BBC Radio Scotland	Episode 4	
2014	BBC New Comedy Award	Self	BBC Radio 4	Episode 7: "London Heat 1"	
2023	BBC New Comedy Award	Host	BBC Radio 4	Episode 2	
2015	Fresh From The Fringe	Guest	BBC Radio 4	Episode 1	
2016	Don't Make Me Laugh	Guest	BBC Radio 4	Series 2, Episode 4	
2017	Breaking The News	Guest	BBC Radio Scotland	Series 7, Episode 4	
2020	Breaking The News	Guest	BBC Radio Scotland	Series 16, Episode 8	
2020	The Good, The Bad And The Unexpected	Guest	BBC Radio Scotland	Series 6, Episode 5	
2022	Welcome To The Neighbourhood	Guest	BBC Radio 4	Series 1, Episode 2	
2022	The Edinburgh Comedy Awards Nominee Gala	Self	BBC Radio 4		

== Personal life ==
Dean is gay and speaks about his sexuality as part of his comedy routine. He married his partner Mikey Crump on 28 June 2025 in Glasgow. They currently reside in Manchester.

He is a Celtic F.C. fan and holds a season ticket at Celtic Park.

In 2024, Dean revealed he is autistic.
