= Ania Magliano =

British comedian and writer (born 1998)

- Magliano at the 2026 BAFTA awards
- Born: Ania Nicola Magliano-Wright; 17 February 1998 (age 28); United Kingdom
- Education: Girton College, Cambridge (BA)
- Occupations: Comedian; actress

Comedy career
- Years active: 2018−present
- Medium: Stand-up; television; radio
- Genres: Political; news satire; observational; surreal humour; black comedy; insult comedy
- Website: aniamagliano.com

Ania Nicola Magliano-Wright (born 17 February 1998) is a British stand-up comedian and actress known for appearing in the regular cast of Saturday Night Live UK on Sky One since March 2026. Magliano has also performed at the Edinburgh Festival Fringe twice, most recently in 2026.

== Early and personal life ==
Ania Nicola Magliano-Wright was born on 17 February 1998; she grew up in Buckinghamshire, in South East England. She is of half-Polish and half-Italian descent; her mother is Polish and works as a doctor.

For sixth form, she attended Hurtwood House, a private boarding school in Surrey. Magliano then studied English at Girton College, Cambridge, and was a member of the Cambridge Footlights. While at university, she founded Stockings Comedy, a female and non-binary comedy collective.

Magliano is bisexual. She was in a relationship with fellow comedian Will Rowland, with whom she co-hosted the podcast A Bisexual and a Boyfriend.

== Career ==
Magliano was a finalist for the Funny Women award in 2020 and for the Chortle Student Comedy Award in 2018. Her debut comedy show, Absolutely No Worries If Not, won the Best New Show award at the Leicester Comedy Festival in 2022. Her performance of the show at the 2022 Edinburgh Festival Fringe received positive reviews in The Guardian, The Times, and Time Out. She has opened for comedians Ed Gamble and Marc Maron.

Magliano's 2023 Edinburgh Fringe show I Can't Believe You've Done This was nominated for Best Show at the festival. She returned in 2024 with the show Forgive Me, Father. In 2024, Magliano was also nominated for the Sky Arts Awards Breakthrough award. Magliano has also written for Amelia Dimoldenberg's Chicken Shop Date.

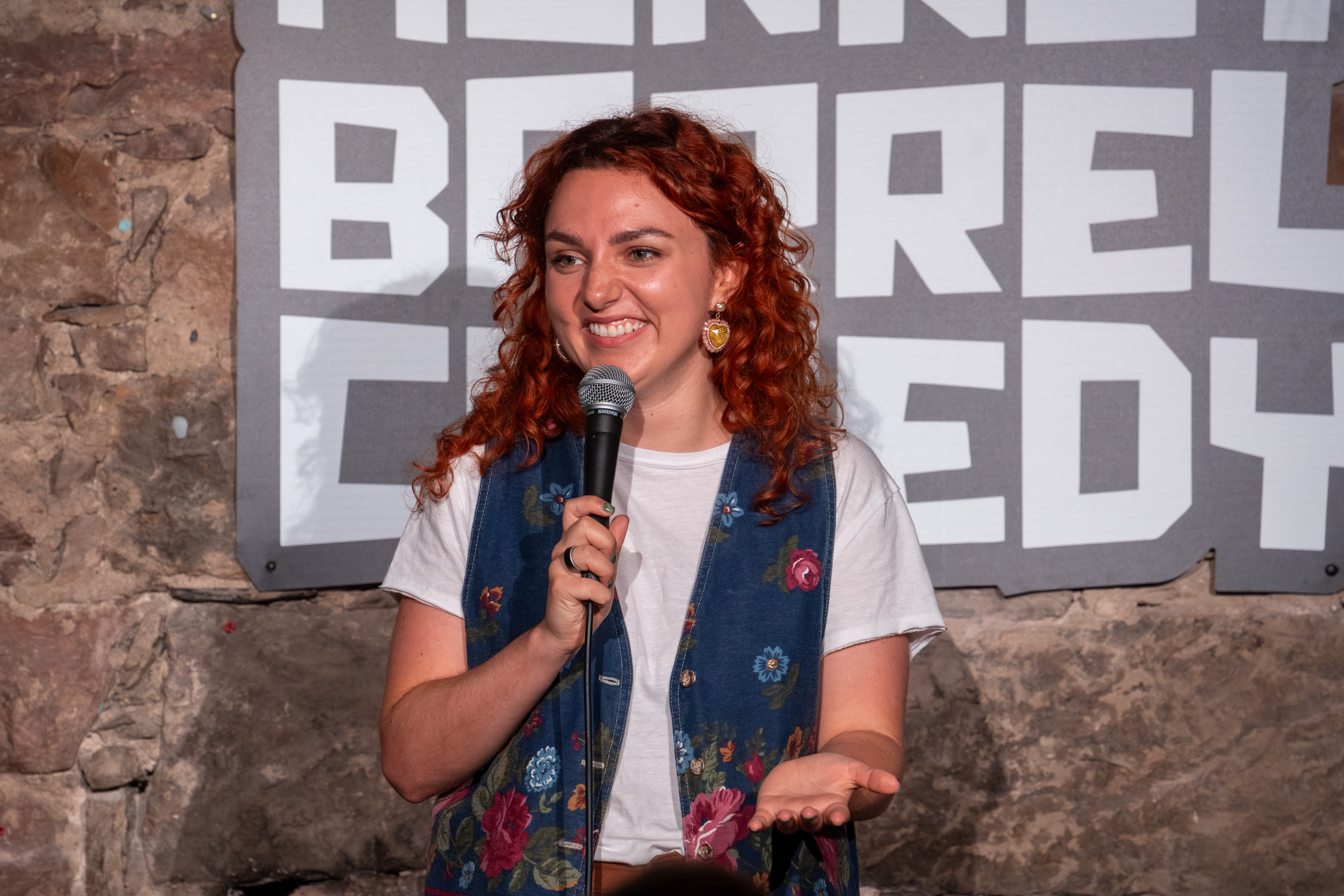
Magliano at the 2025 Edinburgh Festival Fringe

Magliano has appeared on TV shows including The Stand Up Sketch Show and Dave's The Comedy Guide to Life, and podcasts including The Comedian's Comedian, Off Menu, Secret Artists and Fakes and Frauds. She has previously co-hosted the podcasts If It Is To Be Said, about the TV show Succession, and The Weekly Shop.

In July 2025, it was announced that Magliano would compete in series 20 of Taskmaster along with Maisie Adam, Phil Ellis, Reece Shearsmith, and Sanjeev Bhaskar. She tied for first place with Adam and Ellis; Adam then won the tiebreaker challenge, making Magliano place second.

In February 2026, Magliano was announced as part of the Saturday Night Live UK (SNL UK) cast on Sky One. She is an anchor for Weekend Update alongside Paddy Young. Magliano appeared at Edinburgh Fringe for a second time in summer 2026, before appearing in the second season of SNL UK from September.
