= Sam Campbell (comedian) =

Australian comedian, actor (born 1991/1992)

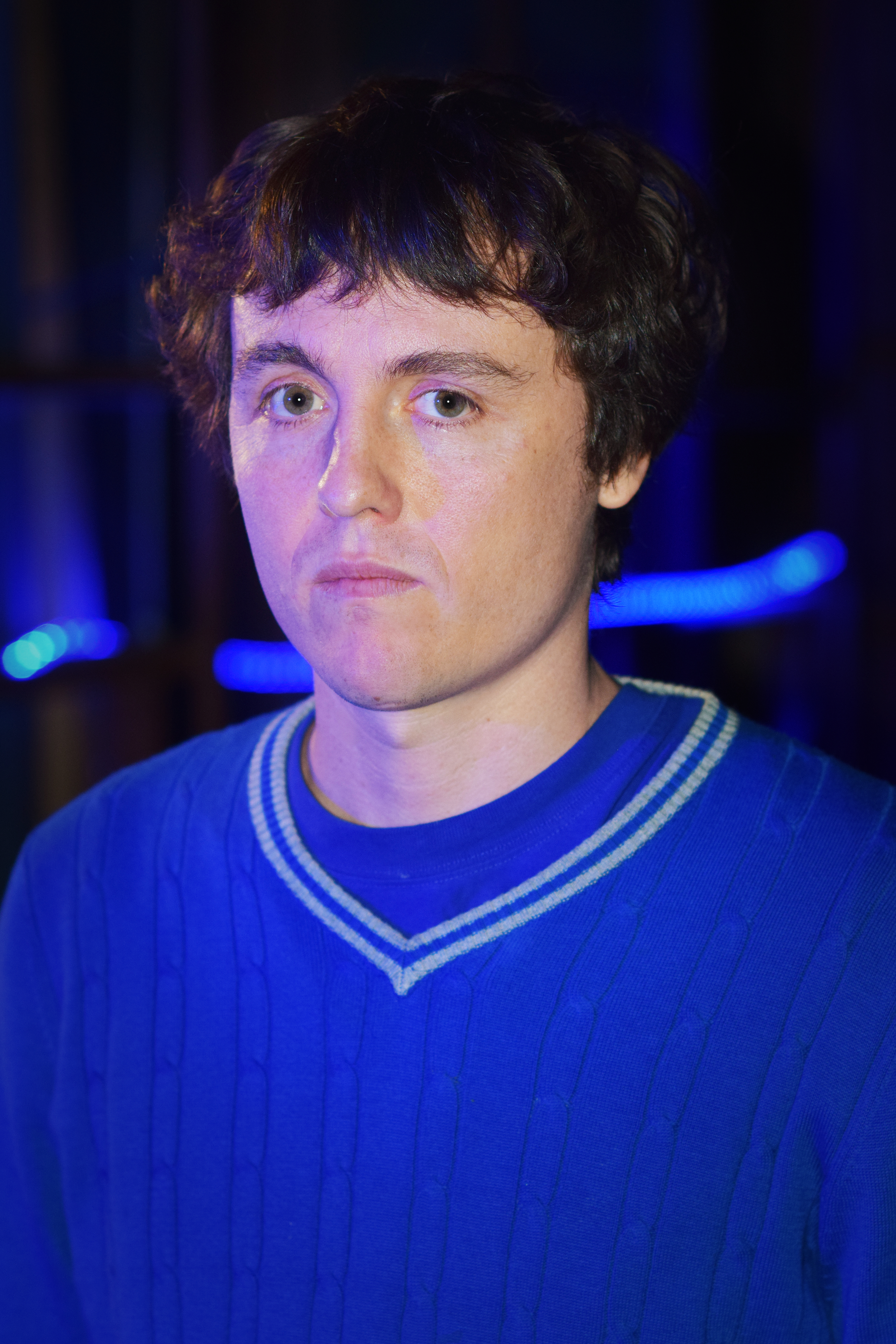
- Campbell in 2024
- Born: 1991 or 1992 (age 33–34); Atherton Tableland, Queensland, Australia
- Education: Queensland University of Technology (BFA)

Comedy career
- Medium: Stand-up; television
- Genres: Surrealism, absurdism, observational

Samuel Campbell (born 1991 or 1992) is an Australian stand-up comedian and actor. He won the Melbourne International Comedy Festival Award in 2018 and the main prize at the Edinburgh Comedy Festival in 2022.

== Early life and education ==
Samuel Campbell was born in 1991 or 1992 in the Atherton Tableland in Far North Queensland. In podcasts, he has mentioned growing up around the regions of Yungaburra and Atherton, and mentioned the town of Lake Eacham, Queensland. He was a small child growing up, and his parents considered placing him under growth hormone therapy. Campbell went to high school in Bundaberg, and studied animation at the Queensland University of Technology.

Campbell lived in Brisbane from the ages of 17 to 21, and in 2011 he was a Queensland finalist for the national Raw Comedy competition. By 2015, he had relocated to Sydney.

== Career ==
Campbell performs stand-up comedy live as well as creating comedy web shows.

=== Australia ===
Campbell's first show was in Brisbane's Sit Down Comedy Club in 2010.

He made a short series that was broadcast on Comedy Central Australia and was a guest on ABC TV's The Checkout.

In the 2010s, Campbell was part of the YouTube collective Skills in Time, with Australian comedians Greg Larsen and Henry Stone.

In 2017, he had a regular weekly segment on Triple J radio, featured in the web-series Dayne's World, and performed stand-up at Sydney comedy clubs. In 2018, he was frequently appearing alongside Anne Edmonds as Connor Bidou, the son of her character Helen Bidou.

In 2026, Campbell was named as the new co-host of the Australian version of Guy Montgomery's Guy Mont-Spelling Bee, replacing Aaron Chen.

=== UK ===
Campbell moved to the United Kingdom, having acquired a Global Talent visa in 2022. He performed at the 2022 Edinburgh Festival Fringe with his show simply titled Comedy Show, which won the main prize. It was praised by the judges for its originality, surrealism and unexpected jokes. The Times described him as "a nutball, but he controls his loopiness with deceptive precision" and said that the show was "exhausting, exhilarating and a touch of genius". Brian Logan in The Guardian said "Campbell's imagination produces wonderfully adhesive images... there is now and then a core of robust observational comedy beneath Campbell's loopiness... None of it has anything to do with anything: it's the incongruity, taken to uncommon lengths, that's funny". The Daily Telegraph review mentioned "one-liners and absurdist whorls of madcap".

In 2023, Campbell was a contestant on the sixteenth series of Channel 4 comedy gameshow Taskmaster, winning the series. On 29 March 2024, Campbell started co-hosting the Lucy & Sam's Perfect Brains podcast with comedian Lucy Beaumont. It returned for a second season in 2025. In June/July 2024, he toured the UK with his stand-up set Wobservations. In March 2024, it was announced that Campbell would pilot a Channel 4 series called Make That Movie, involving the creation of films based on the dreams of strangers.

In August 2025, Campbell was announced as a contestant on the second series of LOL: Last One Laughing UK, which was released in March 2026. He was runner up to David Mitchell.

In early 2026, he appeared on TVNZ 2 in New Zealand Spy, written by and starring Paul Williams. He stars in the new British comedy series Make That Movie, along with fellow Australian comedian Aaron Chen, due to be released on Channel 4 on 28 May 2026.

== Recognition and awards ==
In 2016, Campbell won the Director's Choice Award, and, in 2018, he won the Barry Award for Most Outstanding Show, at the Melbourne International Comedy Festival. In 2018 he won the Melbourne International Comedy Festival Award. He was the winner of the main prize at the Edinburgh Comedy Awards at the 2022 Edinburgh Festival Fringe.

In February 2023, Campbell was nominated at the UK National Comedy Awards in the Best Stand-up category for his show Comedy Show. In February 2024, Campbell was nominated in the Best TV Comic category and Best Breakthrough Act category at the Chortle Awards. He won in the Best Breakthrough Act category and was voted Comedian's Comedian by his peers.

In 2025, Campbell won the Chortle Award in the Best Tour category for Wobservations.

== Personal life ==
On an episode of the Off Menu podcast with James Acaster and Ed Gamble recorded in October 2023, Campbell said that he had been vegetarian for three years. In 2026, Campbell was one of the faces of a Project Slingshot campaign that aimed to raise awareness about welfare issues faced by fast-growing chicken breeds on UK farms.

== Filmography ==
=== Film ===
Year	Title	Role	Notes
2016	Red Christmas	Cletus	Horror film
2018	Working Out - Donny Benet	Self	Music Video
2023	Eggerson Keaveney	Eggerson Keaveney	Music video, also writer
2023	The 2IC	Candidate	Short film

=== Television ===
Year	Title	Role	Notes
2017	Small Town Hackers	Devon Gout	Series
2018	The Trough	Self	Stand-up special
2019	Stath Lets Flats	Nile	Series 2, episode 3
2019	The Paddock	Self	Online comedy show
2019	Get Real Dude - Comedy Blaps	Self	Online comedy sketch
2020	Know It Alls: History	Self	Series 1, episodes 11–13
2021	Pls Like	Lesley	Series 3
2021	The Hundred with Andy Lee	Self	Series 1
2021–2022	Bloods	Darrell	Series
2022	Companion	Self	Stand-up special
2022	Don't Hug Me I'm Scared	Writer / ID Card / Green Apple	Series
2022	Red Flag	Writer	Sketch series
2022	The Russell Howard Hour	Guest	Series 6, episode 13
2023	8 Out of 10 Cats Does Countdown	Contestant	Series 24, episode 2
2023	Never Mind the Buzzcocks	Contestant	Series 3, episode 3 (Sky)
2023	Taskmaster	Contestant	Series 16
2023	Guessable?	Contestant	Series 4, episode 9
2024	Would I Lie to You?	Contestant	Series 17, episode 9
2024	Richard Osman's House of Games	Contestant	Series 8, episodes 16–20
2024	Fisk	Bubby	Series 3, episode 3
2024	Rhod Gilbert's Growing Pains	Contestant	Series 6, episode 2
2024	The Wheel	Contestant	Series 5, episode 7
2024	Never Mind the Buzzcocks	Contestant	Series 4, episode 5 (Sky)
2025	8 Out of 10 Cats Does Countdown	Contestant	Series 27, episode 5
2025	Would I Lie to You?	Contestant	Series 18, episode 6
2025	Sam Pang Tonight	Guest announcer	Series 2, episode 2
2025	Taskmaster	Contestant	Champion of Champions special
2026	LOL: Last One Laughing UK	Contestant	Series 2
2026	QI	Contestant	Series W, episode 10
2026	The Big Fat Quiz of the Year	Contestant	Big Fat Quiz of Telly
2026	Make That Movie	Sam	Main, also creator
2026	Guy Montgomery's Guy Mont-Spelling Bee	Self	Season 3
2026	New Zealand Spy	Pellet	Series 1, episodes 2, 3 & 5

== Stand-up tours ==
Year	Title	Notes
2024	Wobservations	UK & Ireland tour
2025	Window Sucker	Australia tour
2026	Kid Giblet	UK & Ireland tour
