= Fresh Blood (TV series) =

Australian television comedy anthology series

Fresh Blood is an Australian television comedy anthology series that began airing in May 2016 on ABC. The comedies screened in the series are seen as possible pilots for a full TV series.

== History ==
The Fresh Blood initiative began in 2013 to find the next generation of comedy performers and producers. Initially, 24 projects received a budget to produce three, 2-5 minute short form comedy sketches to premiere on ABC's streaming service ABC iview in 2014. Fresh Blood attracted more than 900,000 plays on iview. The Best of Fresh Blood screened in 2017 on ABC Comedy. Five of the teams who submitted sketches proceeded to the second stage and filmed an episode as a pilot for a potential full comedy series. In the third and final stage, the best pilot was awarded a series commission.

From Fresh Blood Pilot Season in 2015, Wham Bam Thank You Ma'am and Fancy Boy were awarded series commissions. Both premiered in 2016 on ABC2.

From Fresh Blood Pilot Season in 2018, Why Are You Like This and Koala Man were awarded series commissions. The former premiered in 2021 on ABC TV Plus., whilst the latter premiered on Disney Plus in Australia and on Hulu in America in January 2023.

== Episodes Season 1 ==
=== Wham Bam Thank You Ma'am ===
Wham Bam Thank You Ma'am is a comedy sketch, music and narrative comedy from a female perspective.

=== Fancy Boy ===
Fancy Boy is a sketch comedy series finding humour in the stranger corners of suburbia.

=== Aunty Donna ===
Aunty Donna is a narrative and sketch series following the fantastic and surreal lives of Melbourne sketch troupe Aunty Donna.

=== The Record ===
The Record follows the story of couples striving to achieve or maintain world records.

=== BedHead ===
BedHead is a romantic comedy about Nick and Sophie, two best friends who sleep together and agree it definitely doesn't mean anything.

== Episodes Season 2 ==
=== Why Are You Like This ===
Why Are You Like This follows the adventures of best friends Penny and Mia and their housemate Austin, socially conscious twenty-somethings who navigate the uncertainties of emerging adulthood.

=== Koala Man ===
Koala Man is an animated comedy from Michael Cusack about Kevin, a suburban dad stuck in a dull job at the council, who at night is a superhero clad in a koala mask.

=== The Angus Project ===
The Angus Project follows the story of Angus, an aspiring sports journalist with cerebral palsy, who employs his hopeless best friend Nina, a failing uni student, to be his carer.

=== Be Your Own Boss ===
Be Your Own Boss follows the story of small business owners who were offered free rent within an arcade seven years earlier. The program is now up for renewal and the business must prove their worth to the community to remain.
