= Greg Larsen =

Australian actor, writer and comedian

Greg Larsen is a comedian, actor, and television writer from Ipswich, Queensland, Australia.

Beginning his comedy career as part of the sketch group Skills in Time, Larsen involved himself in stand-up comedy, notably at the Melbourne International Comedy Festival (MICF), for which he won the festival's Golden Gibbo award in 2014. He was a cast member and correspondent in the 2017–2018 ABC news comedy show Tonightly with Tom Ballard, was a writer and cast member in the sketch comedy series At Home Alone Together in 2020, and appeared as Ethan Krum in the BBC One drama thriller series The Tourist from 2022. He wrote and appeared in the sketch show We Interrupt This Broadcast in 2023.

== Early life ==
Larsen grew up in Ipswich, Queensland. From 2000 to 2004, he was part of a punk band called the Feminazis, the all-male members of which wore dresses onstage. He later worked as support staff for a porn website.

== Career ==
Larsen began his career performing stand-up and creating YouTube videos with Henry Stone and Sam Campbell as the sketch group Skills in Time. The group had a modest 10,663 subscribers in April 2015, and the Sydney Morning Herald note that they had "serious cred in the Melbourne and Sydney comedy scenes", noting that they were "successfully straddling the old and new comedy terrains in a way that many of the YouTubers aren't."

He is known for his stand-up comedy performances, largely at the MICF. In 2014, along with Henry Stone, Stuart Daulman, and John Campbell, Larsen was awarded the Golden Gibbo award at the MICF for the Fancy Boy Variety Show. In 2016, along with Anne Edmonds and Damien Power, Larsen was awarded the Director's Choice Award for their show True Australian Patriots.

He portrayed Dave in Ronny Chieng: International Student in 2017, which he co-wrote with Ronny Chieng and Declan Fay. Larsen was a cast member in the ABC news comedy show Tonightly with Tom Ballard which aired from 2017 to 2018. In 2017, Larsen was the focus of an Australian Communications and Media Authority (ACMA) investigation based on his on-air conduct in which he called Kevin Bailey, a candidate for the Australian Conservatives, a "cunt" on air during a sketch on Tonightly. Larsen and the ABC were ultimately cleared of wrongdoing as the investigation found that Larsen was playing the character of an "unreasonably angry man" and that the attack would have been considered "comedic" by any reasonable viewer. In the final weeks of the show, Larsen created the character Mr Oily.

Larsen started a sketch comedy podcast with Ben Russell and Anne Edmonds named The Grub; when the COVID-19 pandemic hit, many of its episodes were moved behind a Patreon paywall in order to finance their work. During this time Larsen was a writer for and cast member of the sketch comedy series At Home Alone Together.

Larsen won acclaim for his role in the MICF Great Debate event in 2021, and was again an MICF award recipient with his one-man play This Might Not Be Hell, receiving the Piece of Wood Award. He portrayed Ethan Krum in the BBC One series The Tourist in January 2022, alongside Jamie Dornan and Danielle Macdonald. During the 2022 MICF, Larsen was nominated for the Most Outstanding Show award for We All Have Bloody Thoughts. He wrote for and appeared in We Interrupt This Broadcast on Seven Network in 2023.

In 2023, Larsen received further acclaim for his new comedy special Slurp's Up!! He returned to the role of Krum in Season 2 of The Tourist, which premiered on 1 January 2024. His performance in drew praise from Digital Spy, as well as fellow cast members including Conor MacNeill, saying "he's phenomenal and even just how he uses his hands is hilarious. He's a very clever comedic actor." Chortle gave his 2024 MICF show Revolting four and a half stars. In November 2024, Larsen left his manager of five years to join management company the Junkyard. The Junkyard became insolvent the next month and Larsen missed the deadlines to sign up to many of the upcoming comedy festivals that year.

In 2025, Geggy, which he said would be his final festival show, premiered at the MICF and then in Sydney. It covered the events of his career that led up to his card declining at a McDonald's drive-through; Larsen rewrote the show after experiencing this incident weeks prior to the festival. The Guardian gave the show four of five stars, calling it a "relentless barrage of jokes". In April 2025, Larsen was the subject of several Sky News Australia and other right-wing media outlets articles after he criticised Anzac Day on an episode of his podcast, The Greg Larsen Show. He stated that it "was invented as a jingoistic, nationalistic myth to get you to wave a flag and fall in line", and "that the very existence of Anzac Day as a commemoration is a slap in the face to everyone who died at Gallipoli."

== Awards and nominations ==
- 2025 - MICF: Most Outstanding Show (nominated)
- 2022 - MICF: Most Outstanding Show (nominated)
- 2021 - MICF: Piece Of Wood (winner)
- 2017 - Australian Writers' Guild: Best Sketch Comedy (winner)
- 2016 - MICF: Director's Choice (winner)
- 2014 - MICF: Golden Gibbo (winner)

== Filmography ==
Year	Production	Writer	Actor
2024	The 2IC (Short)	Yes	Yes
2024	The Tourist - Season 2	No	Yes
2023	We Interrupt This Broadcast	Yes	Yes
2023	Aunty Donna's Coffee Cafe	Yes	Yes
2022	The Tourist - Season 1	No	Yes
2022	Young Rock	No	Yes
2021	The Newsreader	No	Yes
2021	Hug The Sun	No	Yes
2021	Slushy (podcast)	No	Yes
2020	Rosehaven	No	Yes
2020	At Home Alone Together	Yes	Yes
2019	Aunty Donna: Glennridge Secondary College	No	Yes
2018	Tonightly With Tom Ballard	Yes	Yes
2017	The Edge Of The Bush	No	Yes
2017	Get Krack!n	Yes	Yes
2017	True Story With Hamish and Andy	No	Yes
2017	Ronny Chieng: International Student	Yes	Yes
2017	Ask The Doctor	No	Yes
2016	Fancy Boy	Yes	Yes
2016	The Letdown	No	Yes
2015	Looking Back	Yes	Yes
2015	How Not To Behave	No	Yes
2014	Dirty Laundry Live	No	Yes
