= Henry Stone (comedian) =

Australian comedian, witter and director

- Born: Henry Stone
- Occupations: Comedian, writer, director
- Years active: 2009–present
- Website: henrystone.com.au

Henry Stone is an Australian comedian, writer and director.

== Career ==
Originating from Brisbane, Queensland, Stone began performing live comedy in his home town in 2009, the same year he also formed sketch comedy group, 'Skills in Time', with friends Greg Larsen and Sam Campbell. In 2015, Skills in Time produced a pilot for SBS Television, titled Looking Back.

In 2011, as a stand-up comedian Stone performed as part of the Melbourne International Comedy Festival's "Comedy Zone", alongside Luke Heggie, Jennifer Wong, Ronny Chieng, and Daniel Connell.

In 2014, Stone and his new sketch group, 'Fancy Boy', wrote and performed Fancy Boy Variety Show, which went on to win the Golden Gibbo award at the Melbourne International Comedy Festival. In 2016, Fancy Boy were commissioned to create a TV sketch show for ABC TV and Seeso.

Stone commenced work as a screenwriter and director for his online-produced material, including the web series Dirty Bird, and moved into short film and television work for various programs on the ABC, SBS, Comedy Central and Channel 10.

In 2026, Stone was a director on Urzila Carlson's new sketch comedy television series Urzila.

== Awards and nominations ==
Year	Work	Award	Category	Result	Ref
2014	Fancy Boy Variety Show	Melbourne International Comedy Festival	Golden Gibbo Award	Won	
2016	Grubby Festival Campsite	Australian Writers Guild Laugh Out Loud	Best Comedy Writing	Nominated	
2017	Fancy Boy	AWGIE Award	Best Writing of a Sketch Comedy Program	Won	
2018	The Checkout	AACTA Award	Best Lifestyle Program	Nominated	
2019	Be Your Own Boss	ADG Award	Best Online Comedy Direction	Nominated	
2020	At Home Alone Together	AACTA Award	Best Comedy Series	Nominated	
2021	A Life In Questions: Wisdom School with Aaron Chen	ADG Award	Best Direction in a Web/Online Comedy Series Episode	Won	
2021	A Life In Questions: Wisdom School with Aaron Chen	AACTA Award	Best Short Form Comedy	Nominated	
2023	The 2IC	Sydney Film Festival	Dendy Award for Best Australian Short Film	Nominated	
2023	Blood Sugar Sex Yowie	Sydney Underground Film Festival	Renegade Best Short Film Award	Won	
2023	Square Mo-gal Webin-ya	ADG Award	Best Commercial Content Direction	Nominated	
2024	Aaron Chen – If Weren't Filmed Nobody Would Believe	AACTA Award	Best Direction in Nonfiction Television	Nominated	
2026	Dashcamera Obscura	Melbourne International Comedy Festival Funny Shorts	Best Short Film	Finalist	

== Filmography ==
=== Film ===
==== As performer ====
Year	Title	Role	Type	Ref
2013	Heidi Fires Everyone	Bianca	Short film	
2014	Ad Nauseam	Misha	Feature film	
2015	The Gig at Helmswood Hall	Mick	Short film	
2016	The Tail Job	Pinball Geek	Feature film	
2017	Animal Awareness	John	Short film	
2019	The Push	Henry	Short film	
2021	Blood Sugar Sex Yowie	Terpy	Short film	
2023	The 2IC	Dancer	Short film	
2026	Dashcamera Obscura	Road Tradie	Short film	

==== As writer / director / producer/ editor ====
Year	Title	Director	Writer	Producer	Editor	Type	Ref
2017	We Punched a Nazi	Yes	Yes	No	No	Short film	
2017	Shifting Piss	Yes	Yes	No	No	Short film	
2017	Animal Awareness	Yes	Yes	No	Yes	Short film	
2017	The Push	Yes	Yes	Yes	Yes	Short film	
2021	Gym Rat	No	Yes	No	No	Short film	
2022	Aaron Chen: If Weren't Filmed, Nobody Would Believe	No	Yes	No	No	Short film	
2022	Blood Sugar Sex Yowie	Yes	Yes	Yes	Yes	Short film	
2023	The 2IC	Yes	Yes	No	Yes	Short film	
2023	Dashcamera Obscura	Yes	Yes	Yes	No	Short film	
2025	Furore	No	Yes	No	No	Short film	
2026	Mr Adidos	Yes	Yes	Yes	No	Short film	

=== Television ===
==== As performer ====
Year	Title	Role	Notes	Ref
2014	Crazy Bastards	Mortimer Schweppes	1 episode	
2014	SBS Comedy: Hunger Games	Peeta		
2014; 2016–2017	Fancy Boy	Alien / Various characters	7 episodes	
2015	Dirty Bird	Henry	4 episodes	
2015	Fully Furnished	Customer		
2015	Looking Back	Shannon Tackle		
2015	Fresh Blood Pilot Season	Young Mark Chapman	1 episode	
2016	Wham Bam Thank You Ma'am			
2016	The Letdown	Waiter	TV movie	
2017	No Experience Necessary	Self	3 episodes	
2019	Australia's Best Street Racer	Kyle	1 episode	
2020	At Home Alone Together	Covid Spokesman	1 episode	
2023	Expanded Minds Only		1 episode	
2025	Westerners	DJ Op Shop	1 episode	

==== As writer / director / producer/ editor ====
Year	Title	Director	Writer	Producer	Editor	Type	Ref
2015	Dirty Bird	Yes	Yes	No	Yes	2 / 4 episodes	
2015	Looking Back	Yes	No	Yes	No		
2016–2017	Fancy Boy	Yes	No	No	No	6 episodes	
2017	Share This	No	Yes	Yes	No		
2017	No Experience Necessary	Yes	Yes	Yes	No	6 episodes	
2017	1800 Success	Yes	Yes	Yes	No	Miniseries, 3 episodes	
2018	The Checkout	No	Yes	No	No	12 episodes	
2018	Fresh Blood: Be Your Own Boss	No	Yes	No	Yes	1 episode	
2018	Tonightly with Tom Ballard	Yes	Yes	Yes	No	61 episodes	
2018	The Set	Yes	No	Yes	No	5 episodes	
2019	Saturday Night Rove	No	Yes	No	No	1 episode (segment: "The Filter Couple")	
2019	Celebrity Name Game	Yes	No	No	No		
2020	At Home Alone Together	Yes	Yes	Yes	No	9 episodes	
2020	A Life in Questions: Wisdom School with Aaron Chen	Yes	Yes	Yes	No	TV short	
2021	Big Lake	Yes	No	No	No	Documentary	
2022	Sam Campbell – Companion	No	Yes	No	No	TV special	
2023–2024	Fairbairn in the City	No	Yes	Yes	No	6 episodes	
2024	Guy Montgomery's Guy Mont-Spelling Bee	Yes	No	No	No	8 episodes	
2024	Taskmaster	Yes	No	No	No	11 episodes	
2024	Melanie Bracewell – Forget Me Not	No	Yes	No	No	TV special	
2024	Tom Cashman – Pests	No	Yes	No	No	TV special	
2026	Aaron Chen: Funny Garden	No	Yes	No	No	TV special	
2026	Urzila	No	Yes	No	No	6 episodes	
