= Best Day of My Life (disambiguation) =

"Best Day of My Life" is a 2013 song by American Authors.

Best Day of My Life may also refer to:

- "Best Day of My Life", a song by Aunty Donna from their 2018 album The Album
- "Best Day of My Life", a song by Simple Plan from their 2022 album Harder Than It Looks
- Here and Now (2018 film), formerly known as Best Day of My Life
- Best Day of My Life (album), a 2022 album by Tom Odell
- The Best Day of My Life, a 2002 film

== See also ==
- "Best Days of Your Life", a 2008 song by Kellie Pickler
