= Naomi Higgins =

Australian comedian

- Occupations: Writer; performer; comedian; Twitch streamer
- Years active: 2016–present
- Known for: Comedy entertainment
- Notable work: Why Are You Like This

Twitch information
- Channel: nomstrositi
- Years active: 2020-2022
- Followers: 3.9 thousand
- Last updated: 12 June 2022

Naomi Higgins is an Australian writer, performer, comedian, influencer, and former Twitch streamer. She wrote and starred in Why Are You Like This, for which she won an AWGIE comedy award.

== Early life ==
Higgins has a double degree in science and engineering. She dreamed of being a stand up comedian from a young age.

== Career ==
Higgins was a 2016 Raw Comedy National Finalist. Danielle Walker, the 2016 Raw Comedy National Winner, co-hosts the podcast Batch Bitch alongside Higgins.

Higgins co-hosts the online video game review show Gamey Gamey Game, along with Evan Munro-Smith and Ben Russell.

In 2021, Higgins' TV show Why Are You Like This was released in Australia by the Australian Broadcasting Corporation and internationally by Netflix. She co-wrote the series with Humyara Mahbub and Mark Bonanno, and starred as Penny, a younger version of herself. Higgins and her co-writers won the Comedy - Situation or Narrative category at the 54th Annual AWGIE Awards in 2021 for their work on Why Are You Like This.

== Filmography ==
=== Television ===
Year	Title	Role
2017	The Aunty Donna Live Spooktacular	Self
2017	Gocsy's Classics	Amy
2017-2019	Utopia	Sacha
2018-2021	Why Are You Like This	Penny
2020	YOLO: Crystal Fantasy	Maddison
