= We Interrupt This Broadcast (TV series) =

2023 Australian sketch TV series

- Starring: Christie Whelan Browne; Bridie Connell; Michelle Brasier; Adele Vuko; Duncan Fellows; Greg Larsen; Ben Russell; Bjorn Stewart
- Country of origin: Australia
- Original language: English
- No. of seasons: 1
- No. of episodes: 10

Production
- Producer: Mark Fennessy
- Running time: 60 minutes (including ads)
- Production company: Helium

Original release
- Network: Seven Network
- Release: 28 February – 27 April 2023

We Interrupt This Broadcast is an Australian sketch show produced by Helium for the Seven Network and premiered on 28 February 2023. The series aims at parodying Australia's current popular and unpopular TV series.

== Cast ==
- Michelle Brasier
- Bridie Connell
- Duncan Fellows
- Greg Larsen
- Ben Russell
- Bjorn Stewart
- Adele Vuko
- Christie Whelan Browne
- Elena Foreman
- Elliot Loney
- Olivia Suleimon
- Virginia Gay
- Broden Kelly
- Nina Oyama
- Lawrence Mooney
- Gina Rose Drew
- Aaron Gocs
- Rodney Todd

== Episodes ==
No. overall	No. in season	Title	Directed by	Written by	Original release date	AUS viewers
1	1	"Episode 1"	Craig Anderson, Hattie Archibald & Andrew Garrick	Sophie Braham, Michael Chamberlin & James Colley	28 February 2023	379,000
2	2	"Episode 2"	Craig Anderson, Hattie Archibald & Andrew Garrick	Sophie Braham, Michael Chamberlin & James Colley	7 March 2023	290,000
3	3	"Episode 3"	Craig Anderson, Hattie Archibald & Andrew Garrick	Sophie Braham, Michael Chamberlin & James Colley	14 March 2023	304,000
4	4	"Episode 4"	Craig Anderson, Hattie Archibald & Andrew Garrick	Sophie Braham, Michael Chamberlin & James Colley	21 March 2023	279,000
5	5	"Episode 5"	Craig Anderson, Hattie Archibald & Andrew Garrick	Sophie Braham, Michael Chamberlin & James Colley	28 March 2023	272,000
6	6	"Episode 6"	Craig Anderson, Hattie Archibald & Andrew Garrick	Sophie Braham, Michael Chamberlin & James Colley	4 April 2023	256,000
7	7	"Episode 7"	Craig Anderson, Hattie Archibald & Andrew Garrick	Sophie Braham, Michael Chamberlin & James Colley	8 April 2023	256,000
8	8	"Episode 8"	Craig Anderson, Hattie Archibald & Andrew Garrick	Sophie Braham, Michael Chamberlin & James Colley	12 April 2023	256,000
9	9	"Episode 9"	Craig Anderson, Hattie Archibald & Andrew Garrick	Sophie Braham, Michael Chamberlin & James Colley	19 April 2023	256,000
10	10	"Episode 10"	Craig Anderson, Hattie Archibald & Andrew Garrick	Sophie Braham, Michael Chamberlin & James Colley	27 April 2023	256,000

== See also ==
- List of Australian television series
