= RPW Women's Championship =

Professional wrestling women's championship

Details
- Promotion: Resistance Pro Wrestling
- Date established: November 25, 2011
- Current champion(s): Roni Nicole
- Date won: May 4, 2018
Statistics
- First champion(s): Melanie Cruise
- Most reigns: Melanie Cruise (2)
- Longest reign: Roni Nicole (2498+ days)
- Shortest reign: Melanie Cruise (49 days)
- Oldest champion: Amazing Kong (35 years)
- Youngest champion: Crazy Mary Dobson (21 years)
- Heaviest champion: Amazing Kong (272 lb (123 kg))
- Lightest champion: Crazy Mary Dobson (139 lb (63 kg))

The RPW Women's Championship is a women's professional wrestling championship in Resistance Pro Wrestling (RPW). The first holder of the title is Melanie Cruise, who won a gauntlet match on November 25, 2011.

== Title history ==
#	Order in reign history
Reign	The reign number for the specific set of wrestlers listed
Event	The event promoted by the respective promotion in which the titles were won
—	Used for vacated reigns so as not to count it as an official reign
+	Indicates the current reign is changing daily

#	Wrestlers	Reign	Date	Days held	Location	Event	Notes	Ref.
1	Melanie Cruise	1	November 25, 2011	294	Chicago, IL	Black Friday	Melanie Cruise pinned Cheerleader Melissa in the finals of an eight-woman gauntlet match to become the first champion.	
—	Vacated	—	September 14, 2012	—	Chicago, IL	Just a Game	Title vacated, after Cruise and Mr. 450 were defeated in a mixed tag team match by Jocephus Brody and Nikki St. John.	
2	Melanie Cruise	2	November 30, 2012	49	Chicago, IL	Sad Wings of Destiny	Cruise defeated Nikki St. John in an "I Quit" match to win the vacant title.	
—	Vacated	—	January 18, 2013	—	Chicago, IL	Stay Hungry	Title vacated due to Cruise being sidelined with a concussion.	
3	Amazing Kong	1	January 18, 2013	126	Chicago, IL	Stay Hungry	Kong defeated D'Arcy Dixon, Nikki St. John and Thunderkitty in a four-way match to win the vacant title.	
—	Vacated	—	May 24, 2013	—	—	—	Kong vacated the title.	
4	D'Arcy Dixon	1	May 13, 2013	336	Merrionette Park, Illinois	Lights Out	Dixon defeated Nikki St. John to win the vacant title.	
5	Mickie Knuckles	1	April 25, 2014	300	Willowbrook, Illinois	Don't Tread		
6	Crazy Mary Dobson	1	March 21, 2015	539	Summit, IL	All The Colors Of The Dark	Dobson defeated Knuckles in a No DQ match.	
—	Vacated	—	September 10, 2016	—	—	—	Dobson vacated the title due to signing to WWE	
7	Rachael Ellering	1	November 5, 2016	322	Summit, IL	Road to Ruin	Ellering won a tournament to win the vacated title	
8	Holidead	1	September 23, 2017	223	Summit, IL	FW/RPW Rumble In Summit	This was a four way also including Akane Fujita and Kylie Rae.	
9	Roni Nicole	1	May 4, 2018	2498+	Summit, IL	Resistance Chapter II: Revelations	This was a falls Count Anywhere match.	

== Combined reigns ==
As of March 6, 2025.

†	Indicates the current champion

Rank	Wrestler	No. of reigns	Combined days
1	Roni Nicole †	1	2,498+
2	Crazy Mary Dobson	1	539
3	Melanie Cruise	2	343
4	D'Arcy Dixon	1	336
5	Rachael Ellering	1	322
6	Mickie Knuckles	1	300
7	Holidead	1	223
8	Amazing Kong	1	126
