= Michelle Brasier =

Australian comedian and actor (born 1988)

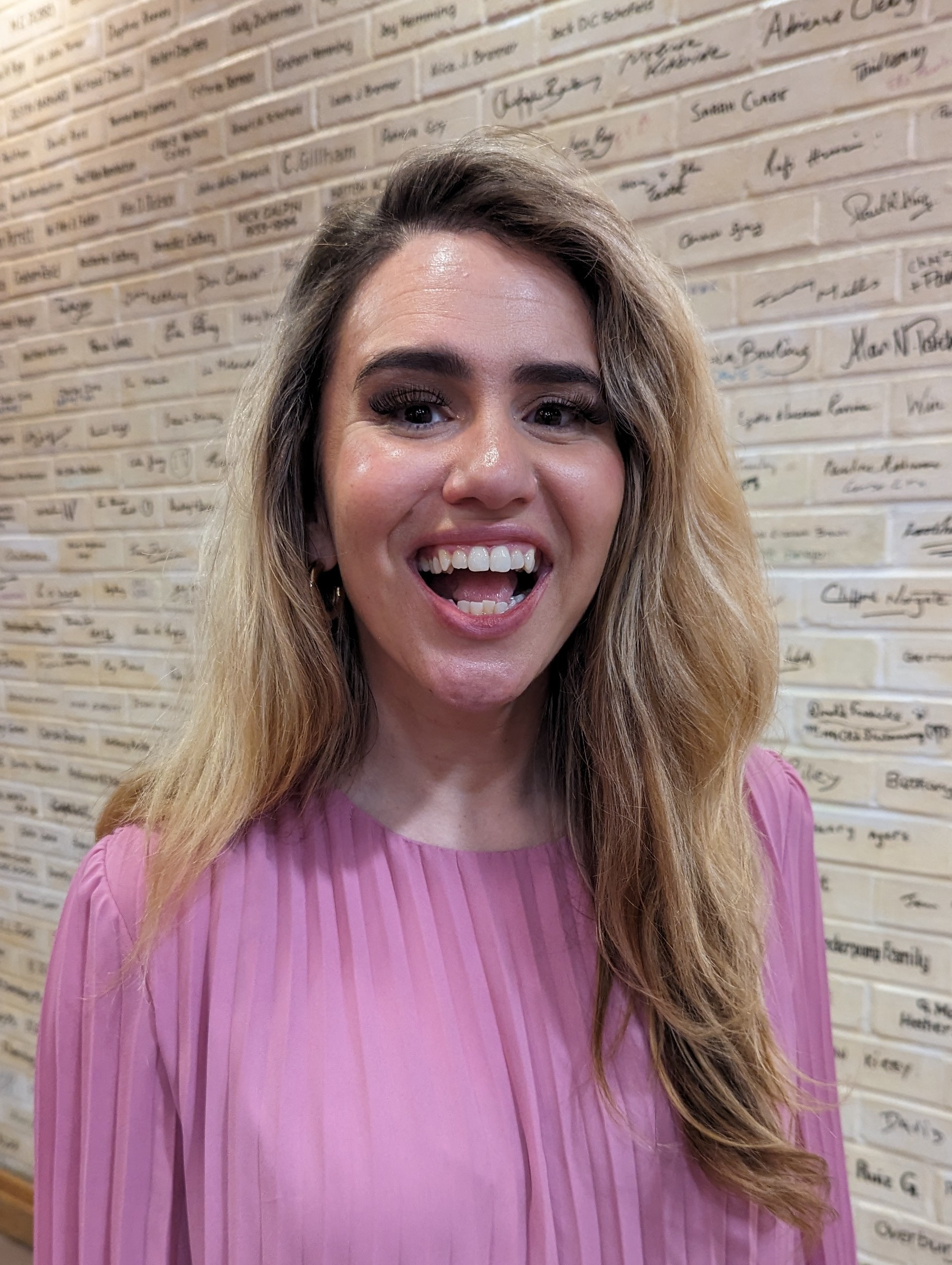
- Born: 22 July 1988 (age 38)
- Education: Victorian College of the Arts (2001); Arts Academy, Federation University (2007–2009)
- Occupations: Writer; actress; comedian
- Years active: 2007–present
- Website: michellebrasier.com

Michelle Brasier (born 22 July 1988) is an Australian comedian, writer and actor. She is known for her work with the comedy group Aunty Donna, her live shows, performing in comedy duo Double Denim with Laura Frew, and for performing with her partner Tim Lancaster.

== Early life and education ==
Brasier was born in 1988 and grew up in Wagga Wagga, New South Wales. She was the youngest child, and her family was very sporty.

In 2007, she moved to Melbourne to study musical theatre at the Victorian College of the Arts. After one year there she enrolled in a three-year degree of Music Theatre at the Arts Academy, Federation University in Ballarat, graduating in 2010.

== Career ==
In 2014, Brasier appeared on stage with Frew as part of comedy troupe Backwards Anorak in a Game of Thrones spoof named Winter Is Coming, performed at the Edinburgh Fringe Festival.

Brasier's first solo comedy show, Space Tortoise, came to stage in 2016.

She first performed in the comedy duo Double Denim with Frew in a self-titled show in 2017. The show was nominated for a Golden Gibbo at the Melbourne International Comedy Festival (MICF). The two continued in 2018 in the Double Denim Adventure Show, about a failed cruise ship voyage, which won Best Newcomers at the Sydney Comedy Festival and Director's Choice at the Melbourne International Comedy Festival. She appeared on Aunty Donna's comedy album The Album, and joined the group on their Australian tour.

Double Denim's third show, A Very Fancy Dinner Party, premiered at the Adelaide Fringe in March 2019.

In 2020, Brasier appeared in Aunty Donna's Big Ol' House of Fun as a sports doctor. As part of Double Denim, she won the 2020 MICF Moosehead Award.

In 2021, Brasier debuted Average Bear, a personal show on the impact of cancer on her family, which she performed with her partner Tim Lancaster. The show won Sydney Comedy Festival's Director's Choice award, was performed at the Edinburgh Festival Fringe in 2022, was nominated for the MICF award for Most Outstanding Show, and aired as a special on Paramount+ as part of the Malthouse Stand Up Specials.

Her show Reform debuted in 2022, about her experience with an online scam, in which she befriended the scammer and got most of her money back.

In 2023, she appeared in Aunty Donna's Coffee Cafe. Her next solo show, Legacy, began the same year and ran for the duration of the MICF.

Brasier has also worked on and starred in Shaun Micallef's Mad as Hell, Utopia, Get Krack!n, Drunk History Australia, and How to Stay Married.

In August 2024 her story was presented on the ABC Television show Australian Story.

Her memoir, My Brother's Ashes are in a Sandwich Bag, was published in September 2024. It was shortlisted for the inaugural John Clarke Prize for Humour Writing at the 2025 Victorian Premier's Literary Awards. It was also shortlisted for the 2025 Russell Prize for Humour Writing.

== Personal life ==
Brasier met later comedic partner Laura Frew in 2013 at a murder mystery party.

She deals with a high risk of developing bowel, stomach, pancreatic, or ovarian cancer due to a hereditary illness, to which she lost both her father and brother in 2006.

Her partner Tim Lancaster is a musician who performs in some of Brasier's shows, including Average Bear. They met when both performing in a production of the stage show, Legally Blonde, when she was just beginning to look into her genetic history.

In August 2023 Brasier made news after her luggage was lost on a KLM flight despite her locating the luggage using an AirTag.

== Filmography ==
=== Film ===
Title	Year	Role	Notes
Backyard Ashes	2013	Barmaid	Minor role
The Aunty Donna Live Spooktacular	2017	Self	TV Movie
Extra Time	2018	Gretchen	Minor role
Aunty Donna: The Album Tour	2019	Self	TV Special
Fraud Festival	2021	Michelle Visage	TV Movie
Better Man	2024	Viv Nicholson	Minor Role
Stamptown	2026	Self	Netflix Special

=== Television / web series ===
Title	Year	Role	Notes
Fresh Blood: Aunty Donna	2014	Mounrner	Episode: Best Funeral Ever
Aunty Donna: 1999	2016	Susan	4 Episodes
About Tonight	2016	Self	Episode: Brasier & Friends. Host
Aunty Donna Podcast	2016	Self	12 episodes between 2016-2022
Aunty Donna's Ripper Aussie Summer	2017	Various	Regular
Utopia	2017	Lauren	Episode: Snouts in the Trough
Aunty Donna: Best Content Ever!!1!	2017	Various	2 Episodes
Aunty Donna: The Album	2018	Self	3 Episodes
Get Krack!n	2019	Saskia	Episode: S2.E2
Aunty Donna: Glennridge Secondary College	2019	Various	Regular
Shaun Micallef's Mad as Hell (Season 10)	2019	Various	9 Episodes. 13 credited. Regular.
Shaun Micallef's Mad as Hell (Season 11)	2020	Various	11 episodes, 12 credited. Regular
YOLO: Crystal Fantasy	2020	Writer / Voice / Creative Consultant	3 Episodes
The Divorce	2020	Janine	Short film
Stamptown Comedy Night	2020	Bimpson Tribute Artist	Short film
Stepmom Blues	2020	Michelle	Episode: Finale
At Home Alone Together	2020	Visit Melbourne Spokesperson	Episode: Two
Aunty Donna's Big Ol' House of Fun	2020	Various	2 Episodes
Geraldine Quinn: I Live for Music Theatre!	2020	Rival Auditionee	Short Film
Drunk History: Australia	2020	Various	Episode: Abe Saffron aka Mr Sin/The Female Bushranger Mary Ann Bugg
Whovians	2020	Self	Episode: Nikola Tesla's Night of Terror
Remotely Funny	2020	Self	Episode: Four
Australian Lockdown Comedy Festival	2020	Self	Episode: Four
The MSO's Perfect End to 2020	2020	Self	TV Special
Romeo, Juliet & Garry	2021	Juliet	Short Film
How to Stay Married	2021	Trish	3 Episodes
Little Bad Thing	2021	Self	Episode: And a Toy Xylophone
Melbourne International Comedy Festival	2021	Self	Episode: Allstars Supershow 2021: Part 1
Why Are You Like This	2021	Sandi	Episode: I Will Not Speak for the Entire Queer Community
Hot Department: Dark Web	2022	Susan from Neighbours	Episode: Bad Auditions
Melbourne International Comedy Festival 2022	2022	Self	Episode: Opening Night Comedy Allstars Supershow: Part 2
Aunty Donna's Coffee Cafe	2023	Various	Regular
Koala Man	2023	Various Voices	4 Episodes
We Interrupt This Broadcast	2023	Various	Regular
Ghosts (Australian TV series)	2025	Lindy	8 Episodes

=== Writing credits ===
Title	Year	Role	Notes
Why Are You Like This	2018	Additional Writer	Episode: I Love Gay
YOLO: Crystal Fantasy	2020	Writer, Creative Consultant	
Childish Deano	2022	Additional Writing	
YOLO: Silver Destiny	2023	Writer, Creative Consultant	
Aunty Donna's Coffee Cafe	2023	Staff Writer	
