= Wham Bam Thank You Ma'am =

- Genre: Comedy
- Starring: John Campbell, Stuart Daulman, Henry Stone, Jonathan Schuster, Greg Larsen, Anne Edmonds
- Country of origin: Australia
- Original language: English
- No. of seasons: 1
- No. of episodes: 6

Original release
- Network: ABC2
- Release: 8 December 2016

Wham Bam Thank You Ma'am is an Australian six-part sketch comedy television series that began screening on ABC2 on 8 December 2016.

Wham Bam Thank You Ma'am is written, directed and stars Adele Vuko, Greta Lee Jackson and Sarah Bishop. Guests include David Collins, Matt Okine, Christiaan Van Vuuren, Aunty Donna, Henry Stone, Paul Ayre and Veronica Milsom.

It is produced by Michelle Hardy and executive produced by Donna Andrews. Guest directors are Erin White, Nikos Andonicos and Kacie Anning.

== See also ==
- List of Australian television series
