= The Album (Aunty Donna album) =

Studio album by Aunty Donna
- Released: 6 April 2018
- Studio: Stupid Old (Brunswick, Victoria)
- Genre: Comedy music
- Length: 38:06
- Label: Etcetc

Singles from The Album
- 1. "Chuffed (Dad Song)" Released: 8 February 2018; 2. "Professor Whiskers" Released: 15 February 2018; 3. "Best Day of My Life" Released: 22 February 2018; 4. "Fuccboi Anthem" Released: 8 March 2018; 5. "Chop Chop (English Version)" Released: 15 March 2018; 6. "War Isn't Cool" Released: 22 March 2018; 7. "The Best Freestylers in the World" Released: 5 April 2018; 8. "(Walking in on Someone) Doin' a Poo" Released: 12 April 2018

The Album is the debut studio album from Australian comedy group Aunty Donna. It also served as the group's sixth webseries, with music videos being made for eight of the album's 16 tracks and uploaded to the group's YouTube channel. The album features guest appearances from comedians Demi Lardner, Michelle Brasier, Hamish Blake and Matt Okine; in addition to Australian pop singer Montaigne and King Gizzard & the Lizard Wizard guitarist Joey Walker.

The album and accompanying web series were announced with the release of a trailer on 4 February 2018. The first single, "Chuffed (Dad Song)," was released four days later. The final single and video was "(Walking in on Someone) Doin' a Poo," which was released one week after The Album was released. The Album debuted at number 30 in the ARIA Albums Chart, as well as number 7 in the Australian Artist Albums chart.

At the ARIA Music Awards of 2018, the album was nominated for Best Comedy Release.

== Track listing ==
No.	Title	Length
1.	"Silly Sound Song"	1:05
2.	"Chuffed (Dad Song)"	2:43
3.	"Fuccboi Anthem"	3:22
4.	"Sometimes I Struggle To Finish Projects"	0:10
5.	"Best Day of My Life" (featuring Demi Lardner)	2:41
6.	"I Can't Hear out of My Left Ear"	0:35
7.	"Professor Whiskers"	3:37
8.	"I'll Be There for You (The Theme Song from Friends)"	0:36
9.	"War Isn't Cool" (featuring Michelle Brasier)	3:32
10.	"Chop Chop (English Version)"	2:57
11.	"Don't Put This on at Parties"	1:55
12.	"The Best Freestylers in the World" (featuring Montaigne and Boilermakers)	4:38
13.	"Phone Call"	2:06
14.	"Aunty Donna Theme" (featuring SUB-human)	2:45
15.	"(Walking in on Someone) Doin' a Poo"	3:35
16.	"Secret Track. Pls Don't Listen"	1:49
Total length:		38:06

== Personnel ==
- Broden Kelly – vocals (2, 4–5, 7–13, 15)
- Mark Samual Bonnano – vocals (2–3, 5, 7–11, 16)
- Zachary Ruane – vocals (2–3, 5–12, 15)
- Tom Armstrong – production, beats (1–7, 9, 10, 12, 14–16)
- Alex Pizzol – guitar, bass (3, 6)
- Michelle Brasier – vocals (9–10, 15)
- Demi Lardner – vocals (5)
- Sammy J – vocals (7)
- Joey Walker – guitar (7)
- Montaigne – vocals (12)
- Matt Okine – vocals (12)
- Hamish Blake – vocals (13)
- SUB-Human – production, beats (14)
- Joe Kosky – vocals (15)
- Klaus Hill – mixing, mastering (1–16)

== Charts ==
Chart (2018)	Peak position
Australian Albums (ARIA)	30
