= Anne Edmonds =

Australian comedian and actor (born 1979)

- Born: Anne Elizabeth Gabrielle Edmonds; 11 October 1979 (age 46); Melbourne, Victoria, Australia
- Other name: Eddo
- Occupations: Comedian, actor
- Years active: 2009–present
- Partner: Lloyd Langford (2018–present)
- Children: 1

Anne Elizabeth Gabrielle Edmonds (born 11 October 1979) is an Australian comedian and actress best known for her stand-up work and for creating and starring in the ABC comedy series The Edge of the Bush. Beginning her career in comedy at 29 (2010) after working in mental health in rural Australia, Edmonds uses her suburban background, singing/songwriting and storytelling to create a fearless, self-deprecating and often macabre stand up voice. Humiliation and despair are central themes to Edmonds' comedy, as are stories of teenage mischief, sex, failure, relationships and loneliness. She is currently based in Melbourne, Australia, with her partner, comedian Lloyd Langford. They had a daughter in October 2021.

== Early life ==
Raised Catholic in the Melbourne suburbs of Essendon and Strathmore, Edmonds studied at the University of Melbourne, completing a Bachelor of Arts Degree and Honours in Social Work.

== Career ==
Edmonds has performed extensively at Australian festivals including the Melbourne International Comedy Festival, Adelaide Fringe, Brisbane Comedy Festival and Sydney Comedy Festival, and toured internationally multiple times, performing at the Edinburgh Festival Fringe and the Soho Theatre, London. Edmonds' solo stand-up shows have received multiple nominations for the Barry Award, an annual prize presented for the most outstanding comedy show at the Melbourne International Comedy Festival.

The comedian is known for her character work, most notably Helen Bidou, an emotionally unstable, sarong-wearing, fashion expert who was featured on the ABC hit comedy show Get Krack!n. A full-length live performance, "Helen Bidou: Enter the Spinnaker Lounge", exposed a dark familial relationship with her son Connor (Sam Campbell), and received a Barry nomination and Sydney Comedy Festival Best Show Award.

Other characters created by the comedian include John Watts, Dusty Banjosen and Rebecca, all of which feature on her original ABC show The Edge of the Bush. Billed as "Australia's first Scandi-noir comedy", it was called "bizarre but satisfying" by Daily Review. The show tells of a callisthenics dynasty which has been torn apart by incest, as a family is forced back into reunion by confronting the truth of what really occurred at the edge of the bush.

As well as appearing solo, Edmonds is also a part of a satirical trio called True Australian Patriots with fellow comedians Greg Larsen and Damien Power. A mock-Australian patriots group on Facebook and YouTube, the characters Les, Steve and Gary are portrayed as inarticulate whilst spewing nonsense hate speech. Edmonds commented on the reception to the trio: "The real groups are ripe for parody... We get a lot of people who think it's real which is disturbing. Ours is a complete parody but we get people who go "You guys suck. Stop it", from both sides... Those groups are appalling and we're hoping to show the misinformation that they are spreading. I find that far-right voice in Australia really distressing".

Edmonds stars and has contributed to Fancy Boy, an Australian six-part sketch comedy television series. Edmonds starred and co-wrote Fancy Boy alongside John Campbell, Stuart Daulman, Henry Stone, Jonathan Schuster and Greg Larsen. She is one of the voices in the Australian version of cult US Adult Swim show Fish Centre.

Edmonds has made guest appearances on All Star Family Feud, Celebrity Name Game, Dirty Laundry Live, The Project, Show Me the Movie!, Have You Been Paying Attention? and Hughesy, We Have a Problem. Her solo standup show What's Wrong With You? debuted on Amazon Prime Video in 2020.

Edmonds supported Marc Maron on his 2015 Australian tour.

Edmonds appeared on Taskmaster Australia in 2024 alongside her partner Lloyd Langford. She will be the host of the revived 2025 edition of the Talkin' 'Bout Your Gen game show on Network 10.

On 22 September 2025, it was announced that Edmonds would work alongside Kitty Flanagan for ABC series Bad Company.

== Music ==
Edmonds is a singer-songwriter and incorporates this into her comedy work. Most notable is her song "Flying Home", which was featured in ABC's The Edge of the Bush and is available on iTunes.

== Awards and nominations ==
Year	Nominated work	Award	Category	Result
2015	You Know What I'm Like	Melbourne International Comedy Festival	Comics' Choice Award	Won
2015	True Australian Patriots	Melbourne International Comedy Festival	Director's Choice Award	Won
2015	That's Eddotainment!	Melbourne International Comedy Festival	Best Show	Nominated
2017	Fancy Boy episode: "Three Wishes"	AWGIE Awards	Best Comedy – Sketch or Light Entertainment (co-written with Declan Fay, John Campbell, Stuart Daulman, Greg Larsen, Jonathan Schuster and Henry Stone)	Won
2017	No Offence, None Taken	Melbourne International Comedy Festival	Best Show	Nominated
2018	Helen Bidou: Enter the Spinnaker Lounge	Sydney Comedy Festival	Best Show	Won
2018	Helen Bidou: Enter the Spinnaker Lounge	Melbourne International Comedy Festival	Best Show	Won
2018	Anne Edmonds	Helpmann Awards	Best Comedy Performer	Nominated
2019	What's Wrong With You?	Melbourne International Comedy Festival	Best Show	Nominated
2019	Anne Edmonds	Helpmann Awards	Best Comedy Performer	Nominated
2020	What's Wrong With You?	ARIA Music Awards	Best Comedy Release	Won
