= Linda Marigliano =

Australian radio announcer and musician (born 1984)

- Born: 27 September 1984 (age 42); Sydney, Australia
- Occupations: Radio presenter; television presenter; podcaster; musician; DJ
- Years active: 2003–present

Linda Marigliano (born Carmelinda Marigliano; 27 September 1984) is an Australian television and radio presenter, podcaster, musician and DJ, best known for her work on FBi Radio and Triple J. She also played bass guitar in the indie rock band teenagersintokyo.

== Early life and education ==
Linda Marigliano was born on 27 September 1984 in Sydney, Australia. Her mother is of Chinese descent and her father is of Italian descent. She was named after her paternal grandmother, Carmelinda. Marigliano's father works as a hairdresser. Marigliano attended St George Girls High School in Kogarah, New South Wales. She then attended the University of Sydney and graduated with a degree in media and communications.

== Career ==
Starting on FBi Radio in 2003, she presented the weekday afternoon shift. Moving to Triple J, she hosted the midnight-dawn shift on a casual basis during the week until taking a permanent position in 2007.

In 2007, Marigliano joined Triple J on a full-time basis and started her role as weekday lunch presenter on Triple J. In 2008, she joined Scott Dooley to present the afternoon drive shift on weekdays. In 2012, Marigliano began hosting the Triple J Mon-Fri evening shift, Good Nights, an all-new show replacing Super Request. In 2018, Marigliano took over the Triple J Mon-Fri morning shift,Triple J Mornings, replacing Zan Rowe (who moves to Double J).

Marigliano left Triple J at the end of 2019 to move across to ABC Television, where she continued to present the shows What is Music? and The Set. She co-presented The Set with Dylan Alcott. A third season of the show was aired in 2021 on Saturday 24 April. In 2021, Marigliano hosted the podcast Tough Love and Tame Impala – The Slow Rush: A Deep Dive with Kevin Parker. The podcast with musician Kevin Parker, also known as Tame Impala, was an in-depth look at Tame Impala's 2020 album The Slow Rush. She also hosts the podcast The Dream Club with journalist Brooke Boney on LiSTNR. At the 2021 Australian Podcast Awards, The Dream Club won the Best Indigenous Podcast category, and Tough Love won the Best Lockdown Podcast category.

She appeared on four episodes of Adam Liaw's SBS Food show The Cook Up with Adam Liaw. She also appeared in two episodes of the ABC comedy series At Home Alone Together.
