= Awesome Kong =

American professional wrestler (born 1977)

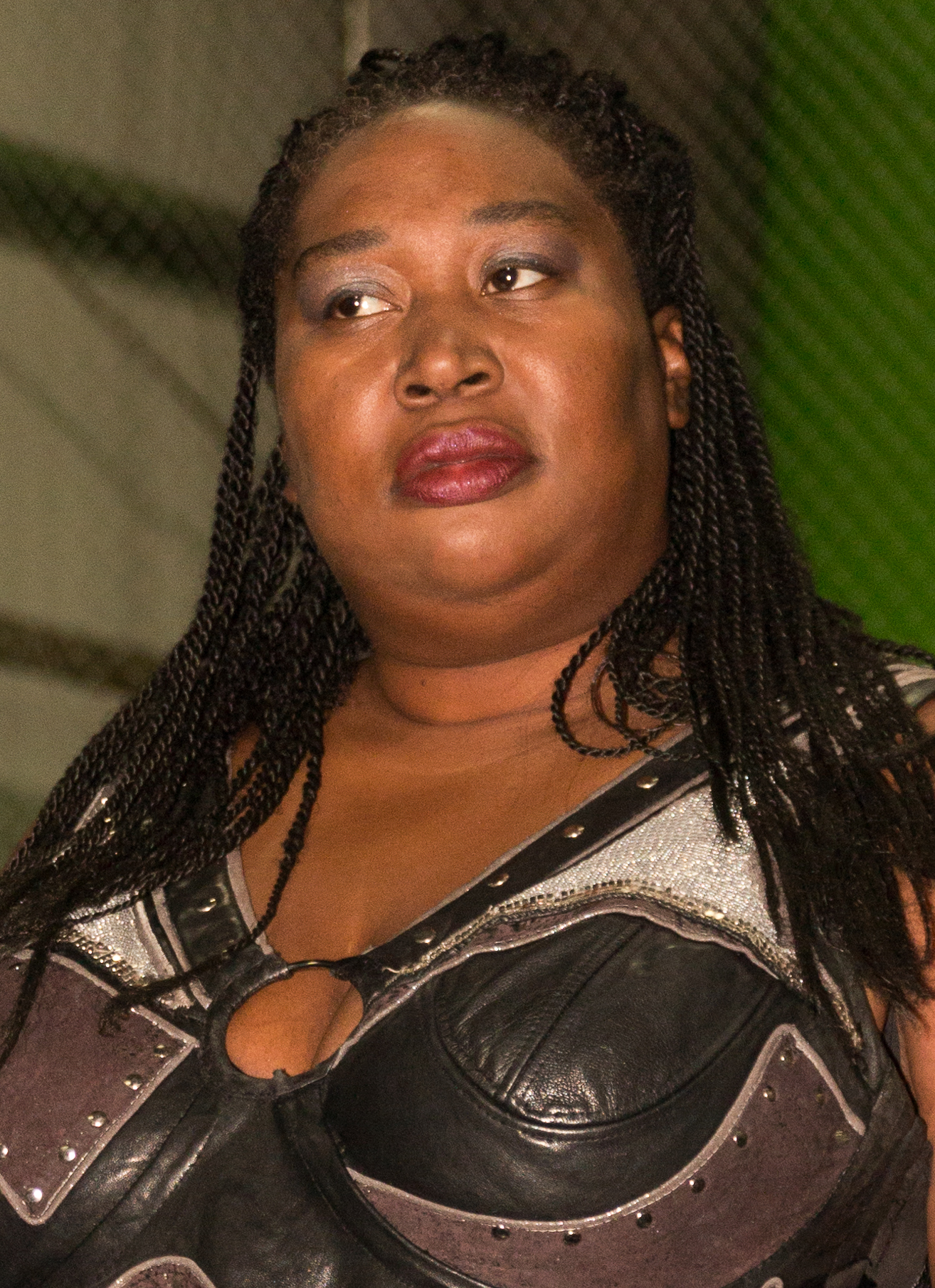
- Kong in 2014

Personal information
- Born: Kia Michelle Stevens; September 4, 1977 (age 49) Carson, California, U.S.

Professional wrestling career
- Ring name(s): Amazing Kong; Awesome Kong; Kharma; Margaret
- Billed height: 5 ft 11 in (180 cm)
- Billed weight: 272 lb (123 kg)
- Billed from: Tokyo, Japan
- Trained by: Inoki Dojo; Noah Denker
- Debut: October 20, 2002
- Retired: 2023

Kia Michelle Stevens (born September 4, 1977) is an American actress and semi-retired professional wrestler. She is best known for her time with TNA Wrestling under the ring name Awesome Kong. She also worked with Ring of Honor (ROH), Shimmer Women Athletes, All Elite Wrestling (AEW), and with WWE under the ring name Kharma.

Stevens began her professional wrestling career in 2002 after appearing on a reality television show. For the first five years of her career, she primarily wrestled in Japan and held numerous championships there. In 2006, she began wrestling in her native United States again, wrestling on the independent circuit before appearing on national television with TNA, where she was a driving force in the foundation of their Knockouts division. During her time with TNA, she became a two-time TNA Knockouts Champion and one-time TNA Knockouts Tag Team Champion with Hamada. She later signed with WWE, where she became the third woman to enter the men's Royal Rumble match in 2012, and she began making appearances for then-upstart AEW towards the end of the decade.

Stevens was ranked first in the inaugural list of Pro Wrestling Illustrated's PWI Women's 100 in 2008. She retired from professional wrestling in 2021 and was subsequently inducted into the TNA Hall of Fame. As an actress, she is best known for playing Tammé "The Welfare Queen" Dawson in the wrestling-themed Netflix original comedy series GLOW.

== Professional wrestling career ==
=== Early career ===
Kia Stevens was inspired to become a professional wrestler by Amy Dumas, known during her WWE career as Lita. In 2002, Stevens appeared on the Discovery Health Body Challenge as a contestant trying to lose weight in hopes of becoming a professional wrestler. Afterwards, Stevens trained at the School of Hard Knocks out of San Bernardino, California. Soon, she was able to have her first professional match in the Empire Wrestling Federation. Stevens also auditioned for Tough Enough 2, a competition in which the winner earned a World Wrestling Federation (WWF) contract, but failed her audition after Jim Ross told her that she was "too fat." After being signed to WWE in 2010, Stevens defended Ross, stating that "If [Ross] hadn't shot from the hip all those years ago, I wouldn't have had the fire to succeed as much as I did."

=== Japanese promotions (2002–2007) ===
After putting on an impressive showing at a tryout, Stevens was invited to further her training in the dojo of joshi puroresu (female Japanese wrestling) promotion All Japan Women's Pro-Wrestling (AJW). While there she underwent a rigorous training schedule, became fluent in Japanese, and engaged in training for mixed martial arts but chose to pursue professional wrestling. She was given the ring name Amazing Kong by Masatsugu Matsunaga, who needed a replacement for Japanese female wrestler Aja Kong in several matches. Stevens, as Kong, worked for multiple women's promotions in Japan, and she defeated Ayako Hamada for the WWWA World Single Championship in late 2004. Later, Stevens cited Hamada as one of her favorite opponents.

In 2004 Kong debuted for the joshi promotion Gaea Japan in a match against Aja Kong. At the promotion's ninth anniversary event Aja Kong won the match but gained enough respect for Amazing Kong that the two attacked both competitors in the main event, revealing themselves as a new tag team named W Kong. The duo soon made their presence felt when they challenged Chigusa Nagayo and Lioness Asuka for the AAAW Tag Team Championship on May 5 and won. The team defended the championship successfully all Summer, eventually losing to Manami Toyota and Carlos Amano on September 20. Going into 2005, Kong main evented the final Gaea show before the promotion closed down. In the final match of Fifth Anniversary, Kong teamed with Ayako Hamada and Mayumi Ozaki in a winning effort against Akino, Dynamite Kansai and Gami with Ayako picking up the victory.

After the closure of Gaea, W Kong went on to wrestle for a number of Japanese promotions including Hustle, where they were given the comedic gimmicks of Margaret and Erika which involved, among other things, wrestling in a yellow tutu. They won the predominantly male Hustle Super Tag Team Championship from June until October 2006. They were also the final team to hold WWWA World Tag Team Championship before AJW shut down. In early 2007, Kong also won the AWA Superstars of Wrestling World Women's Championship in Tokyo, Japan and held it from January to May. She lost it to Nanae Takahashi in a three-way match, which also included Wesna.

=== Shimmer Women Athletes (2006–2010) ===
==== Championship pursuits (2006–2010) ====
Her success in Japan attracted the attention of United States promotion Shimmer Women Athletes, who began regularly booking her for their DVD tapings in Kong's homeland from May 2006. Her debut came on Volume 5 with a win against Nikki Roxx. She defeated Roxx again on Volume 14: Hot Summer Nights in a rematch. The rematch was Kong's fifth successive win which led her to challenge for the Shimmer Championship in October 2007 against inaugural champion Sara Del Rey, for the Volume 15 taping. Del Rey retained to give Kong her first Shimmer loss, albeit via count out.

Kong then began another winning streak, losing only to Ariel by disqualification after using a chair on Volume 17 which set back her chances of being given another championship match. She was placed in a Four-Way Contendership match on Volume 21; during the match Mercedes Martinez used her Fisherman Buster finisher on Cheerleader Melissa but before she could be pinned, Kong dragged Martinez to the floor and the two battled it out while Ariel stole the win to receive a championship match. This incident led to a grudge match between Martinez and Kong on Volume 23, which Kong won. On the following show, instead of a Shimmer Championship match, Kong was put in a contendership match for the Shimmer Tag Team Championship, forming a brief alliance of convenience with Del Rey, who herself was having issues with their opponents MelissChif (Cheerleader Melissa and Shimmer Champion MsChif). After winning the match, they faced the reigning champions Ashley Lane and Nevaeh in the following match, and once again Kong was disqualified after using chairs on her opponents. An assault continued until Martinez and Serena Deeb, who was feuding with Del Rey, appeared to help out the Tag Team Champions. This occurrence led to another tag team match with Kong and Del Rey picking up a victory over Martinez and Deeb.

Wanting to focus on her singles career again, Kong wrestled LuFisto on Volume 27 in a match to take on the Shimmer Champion. It ended in a double count-out, with the two brawling outside the ring through the building and even during the next match in the show. This meant the championship match on Volume 28, in November 2009, would be a three-way elimination match including the champion MsChif. Kong eliminated LuFisto early on with an Amazing Bomb, essentially leading to a rematch of Kong and MsChif's critically respected Volume 9 match. In this match, however, MsChif took a return win after kicking out of the Amazing Bomb and delivering all of her signature finishing moves on Kong to become the first woman to pin Kong in Shimmer. She appeared for one more appearance in September 2010 for the Volume 35 event, answering an open challenge by Kellie Skater with an emphatic victory.

=== Ring of Honor (2007, 2010) ===
Owing to Shimmer being a promotional partner of Ring of Honor (ROH), Kong was noticed by ROH and scouted to appear on both products. On 15 September 2007 she made her debut for ROH at their Man Up pay-per-view (PPV). Teaming with Daizee Haze in a tag team match, they defeated Sara Del Rey and Lacey.

Kong returned to ROH on May 8, 2010, to take part in the promotion's annual Supercard of Honor V. Once more she wrestled Del Rey, this time in a singles match which she lost after Del Rey used a weighted elbow pad thrown to her by Kings of Wrestling stablemate Chris Hero, sparking a rivalry between the two. Kong returned to settle the score with Del Rey two months later at Hate: Chapter II on July 23. The Kings of Wrestling were in the midst of a rivalry with The Briscoe Brothers (Jay and Mark), and so Kong teamed with them in a six-person tag team match, where they defeated Del Rey, Hero and their stablemate Claudio Castagnoli, though Kong did not secure the pin. Consequently, they had a singles rematch the following night, with Kong finally defeating Del Rey one-on-one. At the end of the year, ROH held their live PPV Final Battle 2010, which saw Del Rey challenge Daizee Haze to bring more competition to ROH. Haze responded by bringing Kong back for the December 18 match against Del Rey and her partner Serena Deeb. In the match Del Rey pinned Haze, while Deeb successfully neutralized Kong with a spear.

=== Independent circuit (2007–2010) ===
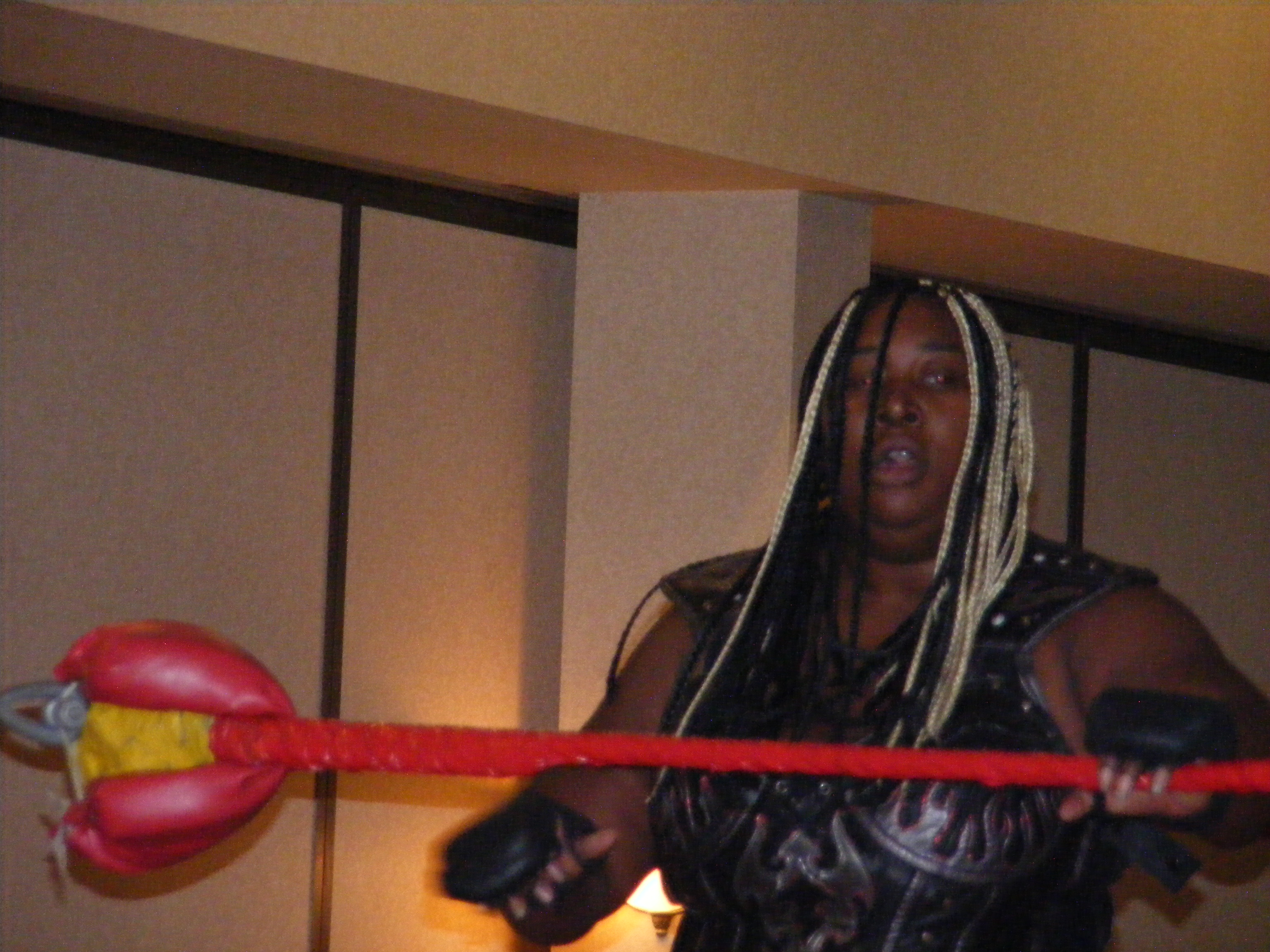
Amazing Kong wrestling for the National Wrestling Alliance in 2010

After growing success in Shimmer, Kong began appearing on the American independent circuit bringing with her the AWA World Women's Championship from Japan. She put it on the line in a champion versus champion match against MsChif's NWA World Women's Championship on May 5, 2007, becoming a joint champion with her win. A rematch between the two in September, exclusively for the NWA belt after Kong lost the AWA title in May, headlined the NWA No Limits 3rd Anniversary Show which saw Kong retain the title. Kong defended the belt in a number of promotions throughout the year but 11 months later, in April 2008, MsChif won back the title via countout under a special stipulation to retain Kong's stature. The following year, Kong once again challenged for the NWA World Championship at NWA Charlotte's Valentine's Day themed inaugural show, Thorns & Roses, in the penultimate match of the evening. With Daffney in her corner, MsChif and saved herself from the Awesome Bomb by using her green mist, disqualifying herself to retain the belt in the process.

In June 2007, Kong toured Great Britain under the ChickFight promotion, wrestling guest matches under that banner for other promotions. The tour started on June 15 in Wales for Celtic Wrestling, where she picked up a victory over ChickFight stalwart Cheerleader Melissa. The following day Kong debuted for Real Quality Wrestling (RQW) and took part in a Four-Way RQW Women's Championship match, that saw Wesna win the belt from reigning champion Eden Black, with Jetta also coming up winless. The following day Kong competed in Chickfight IX, the ninth and final all-women knockout tournament under the ChickFight banner. She received a bye via forfeit, owing to a severe injury Cheerleader Melissa had given her opponent Sweet Saraya at RQW the night before, which allowed her to be fresh against Blue Nikita. After defeating Nikita in the semi-final, she faced dethroned RQW Champion Eden Black and won the trophy.

After achieving notoriety on national television, Kong received more bookings including for the all-female company Women Superstars Uncensored in March 2008. She appeared at their First Anniversary Show answering an open challenge made by Rick Cataldo and Roxxie Cotton, defeating them both in a handicap match within a minute. Later in the same event she teamed with Amy Lee and defeated Angel Orsini and Shimmer rival Mercedes Martinez. Despite picking up the victory, Kong felt that Lee stole the glory of a win from her and went to attack Lee; this led to an Amy Lee's Rules match in the main event of Dawn of a New Day which Kong won after Lee passed out, refusing to submit. The two had a rematch at Army of One which Kong lost by disqualification after hitting a referee leading to a deciding rubber match contested under Last Man Standing rules. At the Second Anniversary Show, Kong narrowly beat Amy Lee after charging at Lee with a chair only for Lee to pass out to the ground and Kong to hit the ropes and knock the chair back into herself. Judging Lee to have been down one count before Kong, Kong won the match but bowed to Lee afterwards out of respect.

After winning this match, Kong was given a match against Martinez for the WSU Championship in December 2009 at a WSU and National Wrestling Superstars co-hosted event. Kong received another chance at the title at Evolve 5: Danielson v Sawa for the Evolve promotion but still could not bring an end to Martinez's two-year reign.

=== Total Nonstop Action Wrestling (2007–2010) ===
==== Knockout Champion (2007–2009) ====
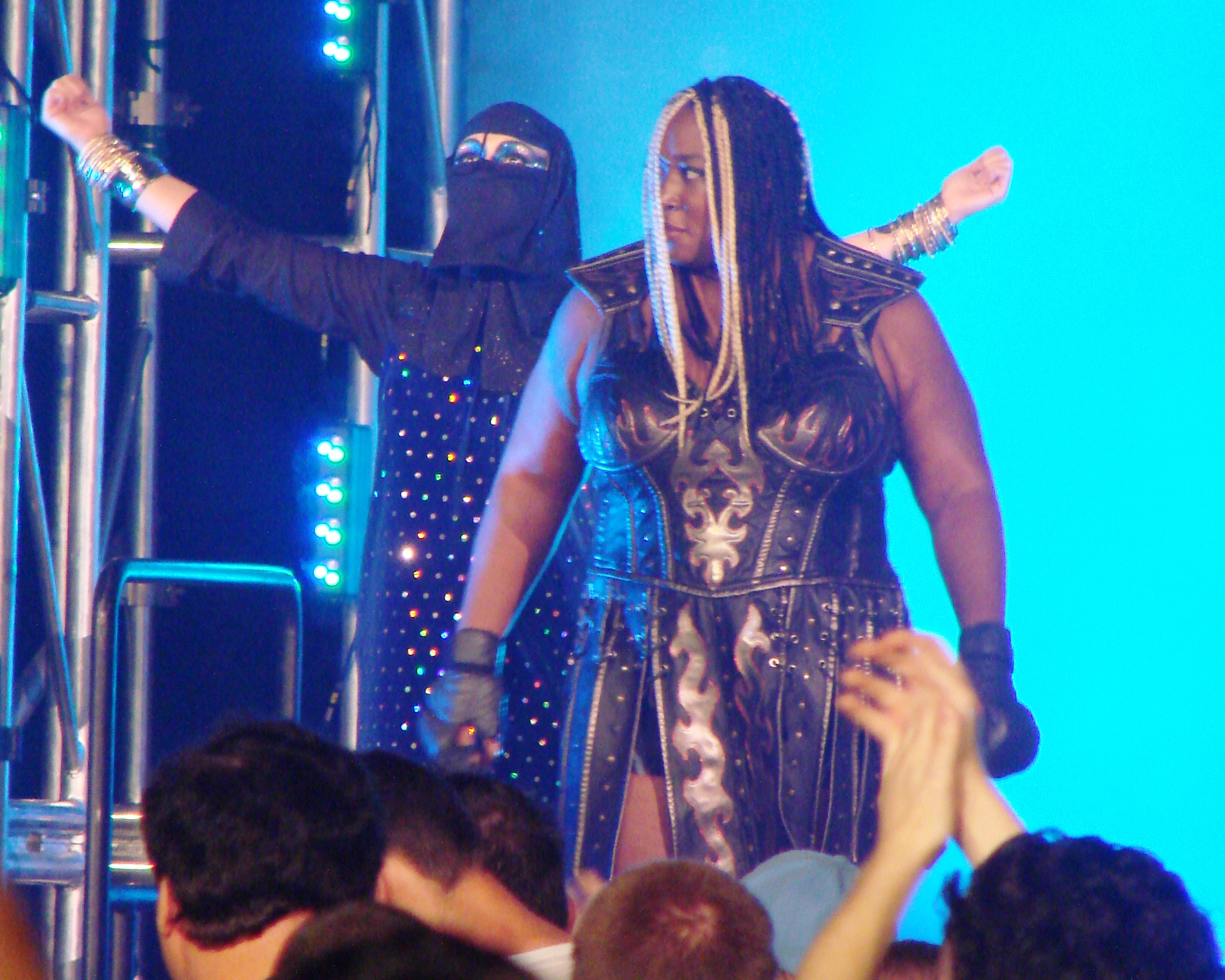
Awesome Kong (right) with her manager Raisha Saeed

Stevens debuted on the October 11, 2007 episode of Total Nonstop Action Wrestling (TNA)'s flagship show Impact! under her original name "Amazing Kong" which would be later tweaked to "Awesome Kong" as part of TNA's attempt to bolster their Knockout division. After defeating Gail Kim, Kong participated at the Bound for Glory PPV. There she took part in a 10-Knockout Gauntlet match to crown the first TNA Women's Knockout Champion but she was eliminated by the combined effort of Angelina Love, ODB and eventual winner Gail Kim. Two months later at Turning Point, she lost a Women's Knockout Championship match to Kim via disqualification after shoving the referee and Awesome Bombing him. This incident led to a No Disqualification match for the Women's Knockout Championship at Final Resolution in January 2008, which Kong also lost. On the next episode of Impact!, airing 10 January, Kong debuted an anonymous manager wearing a niqāb, later named Raisha Saeed; with her help Kong finally won the Women's Knockout Championship. At Lockdown, Kong and Saeed teamed up for the first time, losing a Tag Team Cage match to Kim and ODB.

On the 8 May episode of Impact! Kong began a regular $25,000 challenge to females in the audience who wanted to challenge her for the Women's Knockout Championship. The audience members, played by planted wrestlers, failed to defeat her but one challenger, Taylor Wilde, kept returning and on 10 July she won both the $25,000 and Women's Knockout Championship on her third attempt. Kong then failed to regain the championship from Wilde during a rematch at Victory Road. On October 23, during a live episode of Impact! Kong defeated Wilde to become a two-time Knockout Champion. Two weeks later Wilde's tag team partner Rhaka Khan turned on her and aligned herself with Kong and Saeed. The alliance of Kong, Saeed and Khan became known as The Kongtourage, with a fourth wrestler named Sojourner Bolt joining later. Wilde then found a new partner in Roxxi, who helped her defeat Kong and Saeed in a tag team match at Turning Point. Going into 2009, Bolt became the contender for Kong's championship and left the Kongtourage with Khan. Kong retained her title against Bolt at Destination X in April.

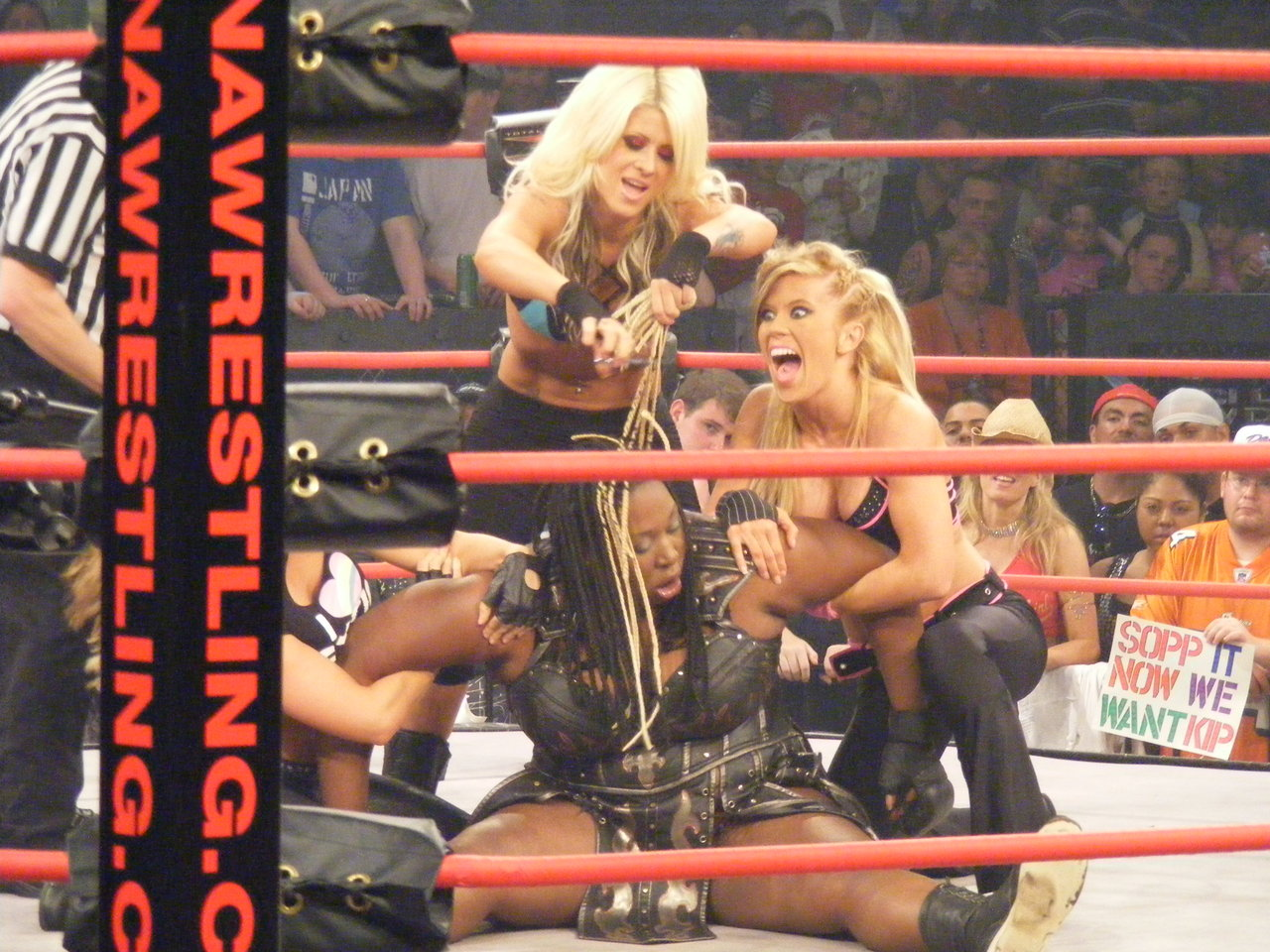
Kong having her hair cut during her rivalry with The Beautiful People

On the March 26 episode of Impact!, Kong and Saeed were defeated by villainous tag team The Beautiful People (Angelina Love and Velvet Sky), and after the match The Beautiful People tried to cut Kong's hair as part of their makeover gimmick. They continued to target Kong's hair and eventually accomplished the task on the April 16 episode of Impact! which transitioned Kong into a fan favorite by attempting to retaliate. The tension built to a Three-Way Cage match at Lockdown for the Women's Knockout Championship with Kong defending against Angelina Love and continual rival Wilde. In the match, Kong lost the championship after Velvet Sky, on the outside, tied Kong's hair to the cage preventing her from breaking up Love's pin on Wilde. After losing the title, Kong defeated Love's allies Sky, Madison Rayne and Cute Kip in separate Stretcher matches ahead of their rematch. Love, however, retained the title against Kong at Sacrifice.

==== Knockouts Tag Team Champion (2009–2010) ====
In August 2009 Kong and Saeed entered the tournament to crown the inaugural TNA Knockouts Tag Team Champions. In the first round of the tournament, the team was able to defeat The Main Event Mafia (Traci Brooks and Sharmell) after Saeed blind tagged Kong and pinned Brooks, much to Kong's dismay. Three weeks later they were eliminated from the tournament by their long term rival Taylor Wilde and her partner Sarita when Wilde pinned Saeed. Subsequently, Kong began rivalries with Tara and Knockout Champion ODB. At Bound for Glory, Kong had her last match for the Knockout Championship against Tara and ODB, but Saeed inadvertently cost Kong the match while interfering. On the following episode of Impact! Kong faced Saeed in a grudge match and powerbombed her through the entrance stage, signalling the end of both their partnership and the Saeed character. After interfering in two of Tara's matches, Kong and Tara wrestled at Turning Point in a Cage match, which Tara won.

On the December 17 episode of Impact! Kong formed a tag team with Hamada as they won a three-way non-title match against The Beautiful People (Madison Rayne and Velvet Sky) and the TNA Knockouts Tag Team Champions Taylor Wilde and Sarita, when Kong pinned Rayne. On the first Impact! episode of 2010, Kong and Hamada defeated Sarita and Wilde to win the TNA Knockouts Tag Team Championship.

In a non-storyline incident Bubba the Love Sponge claimed on his January 19 radio show that Stevens had attacked him while backstage for the tapings of Impact! the previous day due to his negative comments concerning the Haiti earthquake relief project. Kong, who had been a driving force in the wrestling community in raising funds for Haiti, was reportedly sent home from the tapings following the altercation. It was later reported that the same day as Bubba's radio show, Stevens asked for her release from TNA, but it was not granted. After she refused to take part in TNA's January 2010 tour of the United Kingdom, the company suspended her. The following month, Stevens filed a lawsuit against Bubba for an alleged threatening phone call. She was reportedly released from TNA on March 1. On the March 8 episode of Impact! it was announced that Kong and Hamada were stripped of the Knockouts Tag Team title after allegedly failing to defend them in 30 days, even though their previous defense had taken place just 21 days prior, against Madison Rayne and Velvet Sky. On March 22, TNA confirmed Stevens' release, while also claiming that she had requested her release for personal reasons, but she later said it was due to monetary issues and recent changes to TNA management.

In March 2013, Stevens turned down an offer to take part in a special all Knockouts pay-per-view held by TNA.

=== World Wrestling Entertainment/WWE (2010–2012) ===
On December 29, 2010, it was reported that Stevens had signed a contract with WWE. From April 11, 2011, onwards, vignettes aired during WWE television with Stevens, whose face was concealed by shadows and her signature braids, dismembering female dolls while cackling maniacally. During the April 25 episode of Raw, Stevens' face was shown for the first time in the vignettes, and her new ring name was revealed as Kharma. Kharma made her debut on May 1 at Extreme Rules, attacking Michelle McCool after a match, and she continued to attack former WWE Divas Champions on both Raw and SmackDown in the following weeks. On the May 23 episode of Raw, Kharma interrupted a tag team match but rather than attack everyone, she uncharacteristically broke down crying.

The following week, Kharma spoke for the first time to reveal she was pregnant and thus forced to take a leave of absence from WWE. During her absence, she was included as a downloadable playable character in the WWE '12 video game.

Kharma made a surprise return in the 2012 Royal Rumble match as the twenty-first entrant. She intimidated Michael Cole into eliminating himself before eliminating Hunico only to be thrown out by Dolph Ziggler. With her entrance, she became the third female, after Chyna and Beth Phoenix, to participate in a men's Royal Rumble match. This also marked her first and only official WWE match. In July 2012, Stevens confirmed that she had been released by WWE. On August 19, she was added to the list of the playable characters on the main roster in the WWE '13 video game. In September 2013, Stevens revealed that she had been released because she was not ready to return in the time allotted to her. She also confirmed her interest in returning to the company, stating she was ready.

=== Return to the independent circuit and Japan (2012–2016) ===
In early November, it was reported that Stevens (again under the "Amazing Kong" gimmick) would be appearing at a Shine event on November 16, 2012, as the mystery partner of Jazz in a tag team match against Mercedes Martinez and Rain. At the event, Kong and Jazz defeated Martinez and Rain after Kong pinned Rain. On January 18, 2013, Kong defeated D'Arcy Dixon, Nikki St. John and Thunderkitty in a four-way match to win the vacant Resistance Pro Wrestling Women's Championship. On March 8, Kong returned to Chikara, losing to Eddie Kingston in an intergender main event. Stevens has also wrestled for PWS Bombshells (as Amazing Kong) in early to mid-2013, defeating Amy Lee in consecutive matches.

On April 6, 2013, Kong returned to Shimmer at the Volume 53 internet pay-per-view, defeating Mia Yim in the opening match. The Amazing Kong returned to Shine event on July 12, 2013, in a losing effort to Ivelisse in a four way to qualify for Shine Championship tournament among the participants were Angelina Love and Kimberly. Then at Shine 12 on August 23, 2013, she defeated Mercedes Martinez in a singles match. On September 27, 2013, Kong and Jessicka Havok were in a losing effort against Allysin Kay and Ivelisse. On October 25, 2013, she defeated Madison Eagles in a singles match and later in the night she was announced the next challenger for the Shine Championship. On December 13, 2013, she was defeated by Rain for the Shine Championship by count-out. On January 24, 2014, she defeated Taylor Made and on Shine 18 Kong defeated Nikki Storm and Shine 19 she defeated Athena. On August 22, 2014, Kong was part of a #1 contender four corner survival match to challenge Ivelisse for the Shine Championship the other participants in the match were Leah Von Dutch, Su Yung, and Nevaeh. Nevaeh would emerge victorious in the #1 contender match but was unsuccessful on capturing the Shine Championship. On September 21, 2014, Stevens was part of Smash CANUSA Classic where she was captain of Team USA, Stevens would lose in her tournament match against LuFisto who was team captain of team Canada which lead Team Canada victorious.

On August 26, 2015, Kong returned to Japan to work the first ever event of Nanae Takahashi's new Seadlinnng promotion, which saw her and Meiko Satomura lose to Takahashi and Ayako Hamada in a main event tag team match. At the end of the show, Kong reformed the W Kong tag team with Aja Kong. Stevens was supposed to return to take part in Seadlinnng's November 25 event, but on November 22 Takahashi announced that she had pulled out of the match due to "poor health" and claimed she had decided to retire from professional wrestling. Stevens later stated that she had wrestled her final match in Japan and retired the Amazing Kong name, but was for the time being still working as Awesome Kong.

Despite her previous announcement that she had wrestled her final match in Japan, Stevens, again working under the name Amazing Kong, returned to the country on July 18, 2016, to work Aja Kong's 30th anniversary event, promoted by Oz Academy. In the main event of the show, Kong teamed with Aja Kong and Ayako Hamada to defeat Chihiro Hashimoto, Hiroyo Matsumoto and Rina Yamashita.

=== Return to TNA (2015–2016) ===
On January 7, 2015, during Impact Wrestling's debut on Destination America, Awesome Kong returned after a battle royal, had an altercation in the ring with Havok and attacked referee Brian Stiffler. Over the following weeks, tension would build between Kong and Havok, with their feud culminating in a steel cage match on the Lockdown edition of Impact Wrestling on February 6, which Kong won. On the March 6 episode of Impact Wrestling, Kong failed to capture the TNA Knockouts Championship in her match against Taryn Terrell after she got herself disqualified. She received a no disqualification rematch against Terrell on the TKO: Night of Knockouts edition of Impact Wrestling on April 24, which she lost after The Dollhouse (Marti Bell and Jade) attacked Kong. On the May 1 episode of Impact Wrestling, Kong turned face and allied herself with Gail Kim to feud with The Dollhouse. The following week, Kong and Kim were defeated by The Dollhouse in a 3–on–2 handicap match. On the June 17 episode of Impact Wrestling, Kong teamed up with Brooke to defeat The Dollhouse in a "Double or Nothing" tag team match, meaning that Kong and Brooke would face Taryn Terrell for the TNA Knockouts Championship in a three-way match. At Slammiversary XIII, Kong once again teamed with Brooke to defeat The Dollhouse in a 3-on-2 handicap match. Kong and Brooke received their three-way championship match on the July 1 episode of Impact Wrestling, in which Terrell retained the title.

In mid–August, Kong, representing TNA, started a brief feud with Lei'D Tapa, who represented Jeff Jarrett's Global Force Wrestling. The two faced off on August 12 in a match, that ended in a double count-out. On the September 16 episode of Impact Wrestling, Kong competed in a fatal–four-way match against Brooke, Gail Kim and Tapa for the TNA Women's Knockout Championship, which Kim would win. At Bound for Glory, Kong received a match against Kim for but was unsuccessful in regaining the championship. During October and November (taped in July), she participated in the TNA World Title Series, where she ended first of her block, tied with Gail Kim, advancing to the finals where she lost to Jessie Godderz.

On January 5, 2016, during Impact Wrestling's debut on Pop, Kong allied with The Dollhouse (Jade, Marti Bell and Rebel) and became their new leader after she attacked The Beautiful People (Madison Rayne and Velvet Sky) and Gail Kim, once again turning heel in the process. On February 5, TNA announced that Stevens had been released from her contract following a backstage real-life physical altercation with Rebecca (Reby) Hardy just a week before TNA's tour in the United Kingdom.

Kong returned for one night only at Bound for Glory along with Taryn Terrell, Christy Hemme and Dixie Carter to induct Gail Kim into the TNA Hall of Fame.

=== All Elite Wrestling (2019–2021) ===
On May 25, 2019, Awesome Kong debuted in All Elite Wrestling (AEW) as a surprise entrant in the women's triple threat match at AEW Double or Nothing, making it a Fatal 4-way match, which she failed to win. On July 13, 2019, she accompanied Brandi Rhodes to the ring at AEW Fight for the Fallen, being face to face with Aja Kong after Rhodes won her match. She began appearing in vignettes showing her alliance with Brandi. During the Full Gear pre-show, after Britt Baker defeated Bea Priestley, Kong and Rhodes made their way to the ring, assaulting Priestley and cutting a lock of her hair with a karambit. Kong then tied it to her gear where other locks of hair were already seen. In the following months, Stevens and Brandi Rhodes formed a stable known as The Nightmare Collective. The group was later joined by Mel and Dr. Luther. Being poorly received by the fans, the angle was dropped in February 2020 after Stevens went on hiatus to film GLOW. After not appearing on AEW since February 2020, AEW decided not to renew her contract on June 1, 2021.

=== Retirement and sporadic appearances (2021–2023) ===
On August 28, 2021, she announced her retirement from in-ring competition at NWA EmPowerrr, thus concluding her nearly 20-year career. On October 9 at Knockouts Knockdown, it was announced that Kong will be inducted into the Impact Hall of Fame at Bound for Glory. At Bound for Glory on October 23, Gail Kim inducted Kong into the Impact Hall of Fame.

Seven years after her last match in Impact Wrestling, Kong made her in ring return to Impact Wrestling during the celebrations of Impact 1000. Taking part in a 10 Knockout Tag Team match where she sealed the victory for her team after pinning Gisele Shaw.

== Other media ==
Stevens is a playable character as Kharma in WWE '12 DLC and WWE '13.

Stevens plays Tammé "The Welfare Queen" Dawson in the Netflix original comedy series GLOW from producer Jenji Kohan (creator of Orange Is the New Black), which was inspired by the 1980s female professional wrestling league Gorgeous Ladies of Wrestling. She also appeared in the third episode of the first season of 2020 Netflix sketch comedy series Aunty Donna's Big Ol' House of Fun.

Stevens also made an appearance in Katy Perry's "Swish Swish" music video.

== Personal life ==
Stevens grew up in Carson, California. Her mother, Phyllis Durant, was an actress and contestant coordinator for Family Feud. She has a younger brother. She is African American. Prior to becoming a professional wrestler, she was a social worker and owned a business which put vending machines in high schools. Stevens' family and friends helped her fund her career in wrestling when she went to train in Japan. She has also sold Nu Skin Enterprises, a Multi-level marketing company for skin and nutritional products.

On May 30, 2011, Stevens revealed that she was pregnant with her first child. On December 31, 2011, she suffered a miscarriage. After competing in the 2012 Royal Rumble, false reports claimed that she had given birth to a baby boy named Jamie. Stevens revealed the truth about her miscarriage in March.

On August 6, 2012, weeks after she confirmed her WWE release, Stevens stated that she was on a mission to lose weight. She recruited a team of fitness experts and a therapist so she could get back into wrestling shape. She also showed interest into turning the experience into a reality show. Photos from August 2012 revealed a much slimmer Stevens.

== Championships and accomplishments ==
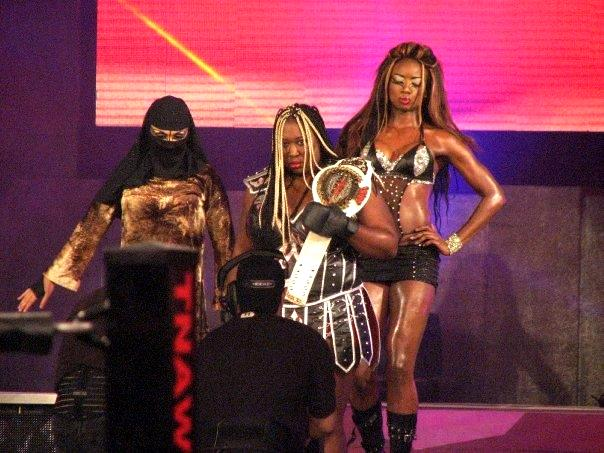
Kong is a two-time TNA Knockout Champion

- All Japan Women's Pro-Wrestling
  - WWWA World Single Championship (1 time)
  - WWWA World Tag Team Championship (1 time) – with Aja Kong
  - MMC Cup New Year Tournament (2003)
  - Japan Grand Prix (2003)
- AWA Superstars of Wrestling
  - AWA World Women's Championship (1 time)
- The Baltimore Sun
  - Woman of the Year (2008)
- Cauliflower Alley Club
  - Women's Wrestling (Active) Award (2011)
- ChickFight
  - ChickFight IX
- Continental Championship Wrestling
  - CCW Alabama Women's Championship (1 time)
  - CCW Alabama Women's Championship Tournament (2016)
- Gaea Japan
  - AAAW Tag Team Championship (1 time) – with Aja Kong
- Empire Wrestling Federation
  - EWF Hall Of Fame (class of 2017)
- Funkin' Conservatory
  - BANG Women's Championship (2 times)
- Hustle
  - Hustle Super Tag Team Championship (1 time) – with Erika
- Ladies Legend Pro-Wrestling
  - LLPW Tag Team Championship (1 time) – with Aja Kong
- National Wrestling Alliance
  - NWA World Women's Championship (1 time)
- NEO Japan Ladies Pro Wrestling
  - NEO Tag Team Championship (Inaugural, 2 times) – with Haruka Matsuo (1), and Kyoko Kimura (1)
- Oz Academy
  - Iron Woman Tag Tournament (2004) – with Chikayo Nagashima
- Pro Wrestling Illustrated
  - Ranked No. 1 of the top 50 female wrestlers in the PWI Female 50 in 2008
  - PWI Woman of the Year (2008)
- Pro Wrestling World-1
  - World-1 Women's Championship (1 time)
  - Zero-1 Mac Women's Championship (1 time)
- Resistance Pro Wrestling
  - RPW Women's Championship (1 time)
- TNA Wrestling
  - TNA Knockouts Championship (2 times)
  - TNA Knockouts Tag Team Championship (1 time) – with Hamada
  - Queen of the Knockouts (2015)
  - Gauntlet for the Gold (2016 – Knockouts)
  - TNA Hall of Fame (2021)

== Mixed martial arts record ==
Professional record breakdown
1 match	1 win	0 losses
By knockout	1	0
By submission	0	0
By decision	0	0
By disqualification	0	0
Unknown	0	0
Draws	0	
No contests	0	

Res.	Record	Opponent	Method	Event	Date	Round	Time	Location	Notes
Win	1–0	Rika Shimizu	TKO (punches)	G-Shooto: Wrestle Expo 2006	August 19, 2006	2	1:05	Tokyo, Japan	

== Filmography ==
Television

Year	Title	Role	Notes
2002	Discovery Health Body Challenge	Herself	Contestant
2002	WWF Tough Enough 2	Herself	Reject contestant
2007	TNA Today	Awesome Kong	Guest star, 1 episode
2009	The Secret Life of Scientists and Engineers	Wrestler	1 episode
2017–19	GLOW	Tammé Dawson	Recurring role (Season 1) Main role (Season 2–3)
2017	Movie Trivia Schmoedown	Herself	Guest star, 1 episode
2020	Aunty Donna's Big Ol' House of Fun	Herself	Guest star, 1 episode ("'Lympics")
2023	Biography: WWE Legends	Herself	Contributor, 1 episode ("Chyna")
2026	Dark Side of the Ring	Herself	Contributor, 3 episodes ("Jeff Jarrett's TNA") (Season 7)

Music video

Year	Title	Artist	Notes
2017	Swish Swish	Katy Perry featuring Nicki Minaj	A part of the GLOW cast

Video games

Year	Title	Role	Notes
2011	WWE'12	Kharma	DLC, video game debut
2012	WWE'13	Kharma	
