= Aunty Donna's Coffee Cafe =

2023 Australian sitcom

- Genre: Sitcom
- Created by: Aunty Donna
- Starring: Mark Samual Bonanno; Broden Kelly; Zachary Ruane; Gaby Seow; Michelle Brasier; Vidya Rajan; Mish Wittrup
- Music by: Tom Zachariou
- Country of origin: Australia
- Original language: English
- No. of seasons: 1
- No. of episodes: 6

Production
- Executive producers: Todd Abbott; Thomas Armstrong; Mark Samual Bonanno; Katherine Dale; Broden Kelly; Sam Lingham; Georgia Mappin; Rachel Millar; Max Miller; Zachary Ruane
- Running time: 23–26 minutes
- Production companies: Australian Broadcasting Corporation; Haven't You Done Well Productions

Original release
- Network: ABC iView
- Release: 12 March 2023

Related
- Aunty Donna's Big Ol' House of Fun

Aunty Donna's Coffee Cafe is an Australian absurdist sitcom television series created by and starring the comedy group Aunty Donna. It is the second television series by the troupe after Aunty Donna's Big Ol' House of Fun, and premiered on 12 April 2023 on ABC iView. It follows the three main members of Aunty Donna running a trendy cafe in the Melbourne laneways.

== Cast ==
=== Main ===
- Mark Samual Bonanno as himself
- Zachary Ruane as himself
- Broden Kelly as himself
- Gaby Seow as Stephanie
- Michelle Brasier as herself, Dame Nellie Melba, and Drew
- Vidya Rajan as The Nameless One, Thelma, and Jake
- Mish Wittrup as Dorkoh, Renesme, Edith Cowan, The Witch, and Karen

=== Guest ===
- Sally-Anne Upton as herself
- Patrick Durnan-Silva as The Blueberry Burglar
- Nazeem Hussain as Kid Person
- Pia Miranda as Nic
- Steven Oliver as himself and The Pied Piper
- Lena Moon as Dame Mary Gilmore and herself
- Annie Lumsden as Angela and Mary Reibey
- Ben Russell as the Health Inspector and Naughts & Crosses Announcer
- John Marc Desengano as himself
- Xavier Michelides as Gino
- Frankie McNair as herself and a police officer
- Honor Wolff as a grieving widow and Lizzy
- Shaun Micallef as himself
- Sam Pang as Matt
- Richard Roxburgh as Rake
- Sammy J as Jordan
- Melanie Bracewell as herself
- Tony Martin as himself
- Matt Doran as Mouse

== Episodes ==
No. overall	No. in season	Title	Directed by	Written by	Original release date
1	1	"We Need Cool Customers"	Max Miller	Aunty Donna	12 March 2023
2	2	"We Got Burgled!"	Max Miller	Aunty Donna	12 March 2023
3	3	"We're Open Til 5pm Today"	Max Miller	Aunty Donna	12 March 2023
4	4	"We're Closed (Didn't Pay Rent)"	Max Miller	Aunty Donna	12 March 2023
5	5	"We're Getting a Toilet Door"	Max Miller	Aunty Donna	12 March 2023
6	6	"We Got a Bad Review :("	Max Miller	Aunty Donna	12 March 2023

== Production ==
Aunty Donna had previously created a self-titled half-hour pilot for ABC in 2015 as part of Screen Australia's Fresh Blood Pilot Season initiative, but this pilot was not picked up. The series also followed Netflix's Aunty Donna's Big Ol' House of Fun, which did not receive a second season, allowing the group to work on Coffee Cafe instead.

During the pitching phase, the ABC asked the group to "dial up" the sitcom element present in the show to involve more workplace comedy. The show was filmed in Docklands Studios Melbourne. Coffee Cafe was announced on 25 August 2022 as Aunty Donna's Untitled Project,

== Release ==
The six-episode series premiered on 12 March 2023 on ABC iView.

== Reception ==
The series received mixed reviews. The Guardian put forward that the series "isn't their best," but also stated that "much joy comes from their zaniness and unpredictability," and that "even when they're not brilliant, their shtick still feels fresh. Concrete Playground compared the show to It's Always Sunny in Philadelphia as well as I Think You Should Leave with Tim Robinson, and stated that its gags [fly] so thick and fast that laughing at one joke or bit of banter usually means drowning out the next with your own chuckles." TV Tonight concluded that "it all makes for an entertaining nonsense, that reminds us why ABC Comedy still leads the genre, backing original voices and risky ideas rather than replicating traditional tropes."

The show received negative attention from right-wing pundits such as Chris Kenny at Sky News Australia, who stated that the show was "uncreative" and "unintelligent" and noted that "it was funded by the taxes that adults like you and I pay", which Aunty Donna themselves reacted positively to.
