= Aunty Donna's Big Ol' House of Fun =

American sketch comedy series

- Genre: Sketch comedy
- Created by: Aunty Donna
- Starring: Mark Samual Bonanno; Broden Kelly; Zachary Ruane
- Music by: Tom Armstrong
- Countries of origin: United States; Australia
- Original language: English
- No. of seasons: 1
- No. of episodes: 6

Production
- Executive producers: Thomas Armstrong; Mark Samual Bonanno; Broden Kelly; Sam Lingham; Max Miller; Zachary Ruane; Mike Falbo; Ed Helms; Scott Aukerman; David Jargowsky; Katherine Dale
- Running time: 17–23 minutes
- Production companies: Haven't You Done Well Productions; Pacific Electric Picture Company; Comedy Bang! Bang!

Original release
- Network: Netflix
- Release: 11 November 2020

Related
- Aunty Donna's Coffee Cafe

Aunty Donna's Big Ol' House of Fun is a sketch comedy television series created by and starring members of the Australian comedy group Aunty Donna. It premiered on 11 November 2020 on Netflix. The show's absurdist approach has been compared to the likes of Monty Python and Tim and Eric.

Aunty Donna released their second series, Aunty Donna's Coffee Cafe, in 2023.

== Cast ==
=== Main ===
- Mark Samual Bonanno
- Broden Kelly
- Zachary Ruane

=== Guest ===
- Randy Feltface as himself
- Kristen Schaal as the dishwasher (voice)
- Karan Soni as Jerry Seinfeld
- Ed Helms as himself / Egg Helms
- Kia Stevens as herself / Awesome Kong
- Ronny Chieng as Voice-Over
- Antony Starr as Stray Man
- Sarah Burns as Pirate
- Jack Quaid as Basketball Player
- "Weird Al" Yankovic as himself and Lindsay
- Scott Aukerman as Police Officer 1
- Tawny Newsome as The Queen of England
- Paul F. Tompkins as Jukebox
- Michelle Brasier as various including Sports Doctor, and Leg Head
- Rekha Shankar as various, including woman at fight-scene
- Tipper Newton as various, including neighbour
- Jessica Knappett as Zach pretending to be an English Lady at the Bar

== Episodes ==
No. overall	No. in season	Title	Directed by	Written by	Original release date
1	1	"Housemates"	Max Miller	Aunty Donna	11 November 2020
The members of Aunty Donna (Broden, Zach, and Mark) realise that their dishwasher has become sentient while singing about drums. The dishwasher starts to become annoying, so they evict the appliance. Then, having a vacancy in their apartment, they decide to get another tenant to stay with them. They interview a variety of people including Randy Feltface, a man with only the claws of a chameleon, and "Cow-Doy," but nobody is right for their apartment, in addition to many other absurd characters. Later, Zach changes the Wi-Fi network's name to "poo-poo" and the neighbourhood, along with the rest of Aunty Donna, applauds their genius. Jerry Seinfeld comes out to congratulate them, but then rejects them when they ask to be on Comedians in Cars Getting Coffee. It is revealed that they chose Cow-Doy to live in the space their dishwasher used to occupy.
2	2	"Treasure"	Max Miller	Aunty Donna	11 November 2020
In the year 1554, a pirate stumbles into Aunty Donna's home and dies, leaving only a treasure map that the comedians find while singing about "morning brown" (or coffee, as Broden reveals). They decide to search for the treasure, but all have ulterior motives to out the others and take the money for themselves. Then, randomly, they go out to interview people on the streets when the executive producer, Ed Helms appears to chastise them for getting distracted from the plot of the show. They make up, but then Ed reveals that his name is really Egg. Meanwhile, Mark becomes confused while looking for the pirate "booty" and calls in booty finders from South Africa who both tell him that they are really from New Zealand and Scotland but the other one doesn't know. Zachary then gets a call from Ellen DeGeneres on her talk show, who awards Zachary with countless gifts for calling. Whilst playing a game of catch with Egg, two police officers and Abraham Lincoln, the boys accidentally discover the pirate's gold which is revealed to be worth £1 billion dollars. As they celebrate, a message appears stating the episode is not canon and the events will not be referenced in future episodes.
3	3	"'Lympics"	Max Miller	Aunty Donna	11 November 2020
In the first scene of the show, Blair Buoyant, a clairvoyant, insults a member of the audience in what was supposed to be a planned-out trick. When members of Aunty Donna joke that they can beat pro-wrestler Awesome Kong in a wrestling match, Kong herself appears and tackles them. She then says that she will challenge them for the most medals in the 2000 Olympics, an offer the comedians hastily accept. Soon after, a drug tester publicly drinks Mark and Zach's urine and Zach pretends to be an elderly lady who sells jam. Broden is enthusiastic about the idea of organ donation, except to a person he knows called Steve, until he finds out he will be required to fill out a form. Later, they all go to a sports' doctor for various exaggerated sports-related injuries, like getting hit in the head with a ball or drowning in e-mails. Next, Awesome Kong gives the comedians Bonsai trees for being such good wrestlers in the Olympics, and then they realise that Awesome Kong lives alone. They invite her to spend Christmas dinner with them, and she eagerly says yes.
4	4	"Dating"	Max Miller	Aunty Donna	11 November 2020
After singing about relatable things with each other, the members of Aunty Donna watch a trailer for a movie about a dork and a jock, who are caricatures of their stereotypical selves, until the dork becomes wildly popular when he befriends the jock. When the comedians get a notification that Zach will be going on a date, they all freak out and begin to get stressed. After the date, Zach lies to Broden and tells him the date was perfect, and he even met the magical King of Dance, when really his date left him and he went home alone. After Broden realises that Zach lied, he finds the Mr. Gentleman's Barber Shop and gets a haircut from the insane barbers working at the shop.
5	5	"Night-time!"	Max Miller	Aunty Donna	11 November 2020
At night, Zach must choose whether to eat a rotten apple or a can of pudding for a midnight snack until Mark arrives and eats Broden's noodle. When Broden finds out, the others are able to convince him that it was a "night thief" who stole the noodle, and compensate him with unwrapped cheese. Later, Broden goes mad while getting Zach and Mark drinks and turns the house into a bar. Zach then kills a health inspector, not realising that he was in on the entire thing. Mark snaps awake and thinks that the entire occurrence was just a dream until Broden stalks through the doorway covered in blood, furious at Mark from shying away from the dead inspector's body. Mark wakes up again in the same situation as Zach disposes of the body in their dumpster out back, as they have done with all the characters who have ended up dead in the series.
6	6	"Dinner Party"	Max Miller	Aunty Donna	11 November 2020
One morning, a mailman (played by a mannequin) delivers the members of Aunty Donna a letter that is supposedly from Buckingham Palace, telling them that the Queen will be joining them for dinner. Broden, Zach, and Mark immediately get to work cleaning spoons until the burst out fighting for calling each other names. Later, the trio book a session at a stylist to get ready for the queen's visit and Broden and Mark ditch Zach to drive around for an hour. When they finally home back, the shop is almost ready to close for the evening. They all drive home, sad and disappointed in each other. After that, the trio hired Lord Whoopee, master of etiquette, to teach them proper table manners from the upcoming occasion. Lord Whoopee tricks them into thinking they are impolite by using whoopee cushions, who eventually dies. Down in their electrical plug, a tiny little man dances around with his tiny belongings until his best and only friend, who is made of buttons, gets sucked into a vacuum. In the end, the members of Aunty Donna have a delightful (if a little silly) dinner with the Queen of England and finally cause their audience to laugh. In the final scene of the season, the tiny little man swears vengeance on Zach.

== Production ==
Aunty Donna's Big Ol' House of Fun, which is based on the acting of the members of Aunty Donna, a sketch comedy troupe, was announced in July 2020.

Filming took place in the United States, as well as Melbourne, Australia. In addition to Mark Samual Bonanno, Broden Kelly and Zachary Ruane starring in the series as caricatures of themselves, notable actors and comedians, including Ed Helms (who also serves as an executive producer), "Weird Al" Yankovic and Kia Stevens, appear in cameos. Tawny Newsome portrays the "Queen of England", and Kristen Schaal voices the troupe's dishwasher.

The series' music was composed almost entirely by Tom Armstrong, a member of the sketch troupe.

== Release ==
The six-episode series premiered on 11 November 2020 on Netflix.

== Reception ==
The series received critical acclaim, receiving a rating of 100% on Rotten Tomatoes. On Metacritic, it has a score of 85 out of 100, based on reviews from 4 critics, indicating "universal acclaim". Junkee noted that "it seems the entire world has learned that the Aunty Donna boys are hilarious, a fact many Aussies have known for a long time after their new series dropped on Netflix last week." The media website also praised the many cameos made by Ed Helms, "Weird Al" Yankovic, and Randy Feltface. The Guardian commented on how many of Aunty Donna's previous Australian YouTube and Reddit followers enjoyed the show, and Decider said that the members of the comedy troupe were "the illegitimate grandchildren of Monty Python and sons of Tom Green." TV Tonight gave the first season four out of five stars.
