= Why Are You Like This =

Australian television comedy series

- Genre: Comedy
- Created by: Naomi Higgins; Humyara Mahbub; Mark Samual Bonanno
- Directed by: Jessie Oldfield; Adam Murfet
- Starring: Naomi Higgins; Olivia Junkeer; Wil King
- Opening theme: "Big Shot" by Pearls
- Country of origin: Australia
- Original language: English
- No. of series: 1
- No. of episodes: 6

Production
- Executive producers: Jessie Oldfield; Adam Murfet; Amanda Higgs; Nick Hayden; Rick Kalowski
- Producer: Sarah Freeman
- Cinematography: Shelley Farthing-Dawe
- Production company: CKOL

Original release
- Network: ABC Television
- Release: 27 November 2018 – 16 March 2021

Why Are You Like This is an Australian television comedy series created by Naomi Higgins, Humyara Mahbub and Mark Samual Bonanno. Starring Higgins, Olivia Junkeer and Wil King, it follows three friends in their early twenties as they navigate work, relationships and contemporary social expectations in Melbourne.

The programme originated with the pilot "I Love Gay", broadcast through Fresh Blood, a comedy development initiative of the Australian Broadcasting Corporation (ABC) and Screen Australia, on 27 November 2018. Following the pilot, the series was commissioned by the ABC and Netflix, with production funding from Screen Australia. Produced by CKOL in association with Film Victoria, the six-part series premiered on ABC TV Plus on 16 February 2021 and was released internationally on Netflix in April 2021.

The series won the Comedy – Situation or Narrative category at the 2021 AWGIE Awards and received nominations from the Australian Directors' Guild and the Australian Production Design Guild. Cinematographer Shelley Farthing-Dawe received an Australian Cinematographers Society National Award of Distinction for the series in 2022.

== Premise ==
Set in contemporary Melbourne, Why Are You Like This follows three friends whose attempts to navigate adulthood frequently bring them into conflict with one another and the people around them.

Penny (Naomi Higgins) is a socially conscious but anxious young woman whose interventions in perceived injustices frequently have unintended consequences. Her best friend Mia (Olivia Junkeer) is impulsive and often self-interested. Penny's housemate Austin (Wil King) is an aspiring drag performer.

Through the characters' experiences at work, in relationships and online, the series explores subjects including identity politics, workplace inequality, race, sexuality, social-media activism and cancel culture.

== Production ==
=== Development and Fresh Blood ===
Why Are You Like This was developed through Fresh Blood, an ABC and Screen Australia initiative intended to support emerging Australian comedy talent. Its second round began in 2017, with 20 creative teams receiving funding to produce three short proof-of-concept projects each. Four teams were subsequently selected to produce half-hour television pilots.

The programme was created by Naomi Higgins, Humyara Mahbub and Mark Samual Bonanno, a member of the Australian comedy group Aunty Donna. Higgins and Mahbub drew on their friendship and personal experiences when developing the characters and themes. They collaborated with directors Jessie Oldfield and Adam Murfet, with Sarah Freeman joining as producer for the 2018 pilot.

The pilot, "I Love Gay", was broadcast on ABC on 27 November 2018 as part of the Fresh Blood pilot season. Following the pilot, Netflix became involved in the project and the series was commissioned by Netflix and the ABC. On 25 September 2019, Screen Australia and the ABC announced production funding for a six-part television series.

=== Creative team ===
The series was commissioned by the ABC and Netflix and produced by CKOL, with production investment from Screen Australia in association with Film Victoria. Sarah Freeman was the producer and Niki Aken was the script producer. Jessie Oldfield and Adam Murfet directed the series and served as executive producers alongside Amanda Higgs. Nick Hayden and Rick Kalowski were executive producers for the ABC.

The principal writers were Higgins, Mahbub and Bonanno, with additional writing contributions from Michelle Brasier, Vidya Rajan and Laura Davis. Shelley Farthing-Dawe served as cinematographer, Marni Kornhauser as production designer, and Edie Kurzer as costume designer.

=== Filming ===
Principal photography began in Melbourne in March 2020. Production was interrupted by the outbreak of the COVID-19 pandemic, with filming suspended as restrictions were introduced in Victoria.

Filming subsequently resumed between Melbourne's two major lockdowns. Post-production took place during the city's second lockdown.

=== Broadcast and international release ===
The six-part series premiered on ABC TV Plus on 16 February 2021. The complete series was made available through ABC iview, while episodes were broadcast weekly on ABC TV Plus.

Netflix released the series internationally on 16 April 2021. Its international release attracted coverage in American and British publications, including Vanity Fair and London's Evening Standard.

== Cast ==
=== Main cast ===
- Naomi Higgins as Penny
- Olivia Junkeer as Mia
- Wil King as Austin

=== Recurring cast ===
- Lawrence Leung as Daniel
- Shabana Azeez as Samara
- Rik Brown as Richard
- Roz Hammond as Julie

=== Guest cast ===
- Lara Robinson as Maddie
- Steve Mouzakis as Charles
- Tharanya Tharan as Nabonita
- Aadhya Wijegoonawardena as Munia
- Michelle Brasier as Sandi
- Dailin Gabrielle as Amira
- Darcy Brown as Benjamin
- Henry Torres as John
- Ra Chapman as Alma Chen
- Rhys Nicholson as Emcee
- Russell Dykstra as Secret Boy

== Episodes ==
The series originated with the Fresh Blood pilot "I Love Gay", broadcast in November 2018. The full series premiered in February 2021, with the pilot serving as its first episode.

No.	Title	Directed by	Written by	Original broadcast date
1	"I Love Gay"	Adam Murfet and Jessie Oldfield	Naomi Higgins, Humyara Mahbub, Mark Samual Bonanno, Michelle Brasier, Vidya Rajan and Laura Davis	27 November 2018
After losing her job, Mia attempts to find new employment. Meanwhile, Penny tries to challenge what she perceives as homophobia at her workplace, focusing on her colleague Daniel. She invites Mia and Austin to a work function in an attempt to confront him, only to discover that her assumptions about his sexuality were mistaken.
2	"The Pressures of Late Capitalism"	Adam Murfet and Jessie Oldfield	Naomi Higgins, Humyara Mahbub and Mark Samual Bonanno	16 February 2021
Penny visits a client with Daniel and Richard and attempts to organise the company's female administrative workers against its workplace culture. Her efforts have unforeseen consequences when newly introduced technology threatens their jobs. Meanwhile, Mia finds herself in an embarrassing predicament involving a menstrual cup and turns to Austin for help.
3	"Dick or Pussy of Colour"	Adam Murfet and Jessie Oldfield	Naomi Higgins, Humyara Mahbub and Mark Samual Bonanno	23 February 2021
Frustrated by her experiences dating white men, Mia decides to pursue relationships with other people of colour and attends a nightclub with Penny and her other friends. Penny becomes insecure about her place in Mia's friendship group. Meanwhile, Austin struggles with his mental health and finds himself unable to leave home.
4	"Hey Rich Baby"	Adam Murfet and Jessie Oldfield	Mark Samual Bonanno	2 March 2021
Penny attempts to declutter her life and helps Austin reinvent his drag persona ahead of a competition. At work, Mia discovers that her colleague Maddie has an online following as a cosplayer and encourages her to monetise her popularity, hoping to benefit financially herself.
5	"The Infinite Mercy of God"	Adam Murfet and Jessie Oldfield	Humyara Mahbub	9 March 2021
Mia observes Ramadan while confronting criticism of her selfish behaviour. Her frustration grows when Penny befriends Munia, with whom Mia has a difficult relationship. Meanwhile, Austin encounters a former acquaintance and attempts to improve his self-esteem through an expensive skincare purchase.
6	"I Will Not Speak for the Entire Queer Community"	Adam Murfet and Jessie Oldfield	Naomi Higgins, Humyara Mahbub, Mark Samual Bonanno and Vidya Rajan	16 March 2021
Penny plans to attend an event featuring her favourite artist, Alma Chen, but becomes conflicted when allegations about Alma's past conduct circulate online. Mia takes an opposing view of the controversy, while Austin, whose new job depends on the event, becomes increasingly frustrated.

== Reception ==
=== Critical reception ===
The series received a range of reviews from Australian, British and American critics. On Rotten Tomatoes, the first season holds an approval rating of 63% based on eight critics' reviews, with an average rating of 6.3/10.

In The Guardian, Meg Watson examined the programme's portrayal of young people whose political awareness often conflicts with their personal behaviour. She observed that the series avoids "fully redeeming or condemning" its central characters and considered its style of humour relatively unusual for Australian television.

Writing for the Evening Standard, Jessie Thompson described the series as an "almost abrasively acerbic Australian comedy". She praised its examination of the economic insecurity underlying its characters' confrontational online behaviour, arguing that it captures how well-intentioned anger at inequality can manifest in militant and absurd ways.

Luke Buckmaster of NME called the series a "rare achievement: an edgy show with a knack for exploring touchy subjects from a fresh perspective". He praised its willingness to address the exploitation and politicisation of social progress, describing its characters as well drawn and its performances as excellent.

Sarah Ward of Concrete Playground praised the series' flawed protagonists and its observations of life in a culture dominated by social media, describing it as "irreverent and astute, honest yet hilarious".

In Vanity Fair, Brian Ng described the series as a "pessimistic and uncomfortably funny sitcom" and discussed its treatment of cancel culture, generational conflict and the contradictions of its central characters.

Eddie Cockrell of The Australian characterised the series as surprising and profane. He wrote that its exaggerated contemporary moral dilemmas could be culturally baffling to viewers unfamiliar with the lives of people in their twenties but found that they produced considerable comedy.

Anthony Morris of ScreenHub awarded the programme three out of five stars. He praised its performances and workplace comedy but found some of its later storylines less successful, concluding that the characters were unpleasant without being unpleasant to watch.

Ella Kemp of NME also awarded the series three out of five stars. She praised some of its individual jokes and the performances of Higgins, Junkeer and King but criticised its abrasive tone, narrative structure and frenetic pace.

David Knox of TV Tonight praised aspects of the ensemble but questioned the protagonists' motivations and found the title deliberately ambiguous, asking whether it referred to the central characters or to the society around them.

Reece Goodwin, television curator at the Australian Centre for the Moving Image, recommended the series ahead of its premiere. He praised its performances and its willingness to satirise political correctness and social activism, concluding, "Expect big things from this series."

=== Portrayal of Islam ===
The fifth episode, "The Infinite Mercy of God", explores Mia's relationship with Islam during Ramadan. Mahbub, who wrote the episode and grew up Muslim, said that the writers wanted to make its treatment of Ramadan understandable to unfamiliar viewers without presenting the episode as an explanation of the religion. She also said that the story allowed the series to depict different kinds of Muslim women and to challenge assumptions that Muslim identity is monolithic. Olivia Junkeer, who portrays Mia, said that Mahbub wrote much of the episode from her own experience. Junkeer described its central theme as the different ways in which individuals interpret and practise the same religion.

A scene in which Mia breaks her fast by saying "Bismillah"—meaning "in the name of God"—before drinking a shot of alcohol later attracted criticism online. The scene was circulated as an example of disputed portrayals of Muslims in popular culture, while BuzzFeed contributor Md Aqib Khan wrote that it had prompted calls for the series' cancellation from viewers who considered it an inaccurate representation of Muslims. Khan nevertheless defended Mia as a deliberately flawed and complex character whose relationship with her faith did not purport to represent all Muslims. In a later essay about Muslim representation, Heraa Hashmi criticised the scene as part of a broader tendency to associate the liberation of Muslim characters with departure from religious observance.

=== Awards and accolades ===
Year	Award	Category	Recipient(s)	Result	Ref.
2021	AWGIE Awards	Comedy – Situation or Narrative	Mark Samual Bonanno, Naomi Higgins and Humyara Mahbub – "The Pressures of Late Capitalism"	Won	
2021	Australian Directors' Guild Awards	Best Direction in a TV or SVOD Comedy Program Episode	Jessie Oldfield and Adam Murfet – "Dick or Pussy of Colour"	Nominated	
2022	Australian Cinematographers Society National Awards	Serial TV & Comedy Series	Shelley Farthing-Dawe – "Dick or Pussy of Colour"	Award of Distinction	
2022	Australian Production Design Guild Awards	Costume Design for a Television Production	Edie Kurzer	Nominated	
