= At Home Alone Together =

COVID-19 era Australian television series

At Home Alone Together is an Australian comedy series which is a satire of lifestyle television in the era of lockdowns, self-isolation and social distancing as a result of the COVID-19 pandemic in Australia. The nine part series was produced by the ABC with production investment from the ABC and Screen Australia.

== Premise ==
At Home Alone Together is a satirical comedy described as a lifestyle television shows for a world in which nobody has a life.

== Cast ==
Hosted by journalist Ray Martin, it features regular contributors, including comedians Anne Edmonds, Ryan Shelton, Becky Lucas, Bjorn Stewart, Christiaan Van Vuuren and Adele Vuko, who share their knowledge, inspirations and advice on how to achieve self-improvement. Additional contributors include Father Bob Maguire, Laura Hughes, Michelle Brasier, Dr Norman Swan, Lucy Durack, Vidya Rajan and Greg Larsen.

== Guest appearances ==
Guests on the sketch show appear as themselves or as characters in sketches. Guests include: Craig Reucassel, Deborah Mailman, Adam Liaw, Andrew Denton, Anthony Callea, Cameron James, Cameron Duggan, Cathy Freeman, G Flip, Costa Georgiadis, Jennifer Byrne, Joe Hildebrand, Leigh Sales, Mark Humphries, Matt Moran, Michala Banas, Osher Gunsberg, Peter FitzSimons, Ryan 'Fitzy' Fitzgerald, Sam Campbell, Tim Campbell, Tim Lancaster, Toby Truslove, Linda Marigliano and Yaraman Thorne.

== See also ==
- Life Support
- Get Krack!n
