= Vidya Rajan =

Australian comedian

- Education: Victorian College of the Arts
- Occupations: Comedian; screenwriter; playwright
- Years active: 2017–present

Vidya Rajan is a Melbourne-based comedian, screenwriter, and playwright. She is best known for writing the 2022 play adaptation of Melina Marchetta's 1992 novel Looking for Alibrandi. Rajan also wrote for and contributed to the ABC comedy series Why Are You Like This, SBS's The Feed, ABC's At Home Alone Together and SBS's The Airport Chaplain. In 2023, Rajan was in the main cast of Aunty Donna's Coffee Cafe. Rajan is the Creator and Head writer of forthcoming SBS Digital Originals series Tantrum.

== Early life and education ==
Vidya Rajan is of Indian Tamil descent and grew up in Kuwait, before moving to Australia. She has lived in Perth, Western Australia. Rajan completed a master's degree in writing for performance from the Victorian College of the Arts in Melbourne.

== Career ==
Rajan wrote for and contributed to the ABC comedy series Why Are You Like This, SBS's The Feed and ABC's At Home Alone Together. In 2022, Rajan won an AWGIE Award for her writing work on The Feed. Rajan wrote the 2022 play adaptation of Melina Marchetta's 1992 novel Looking for Alibrandi. As a comedian, Rajan made her Melbourne International Comedy Festival solo debut in 2022, with her show Respawn. In 2023, Rajan was in the main cast of Aunty Donna's Coffee Cafe.
