= Fancy Boy =

- Genre: Comedy
- Starring: John Campbell, Stuart Daulman, Henry Stone, Jonathan Schuster, Greg Larsen, Anne Edmonds
- Country of origin: Australia
- Original language: English
- No. of seasons: 1
- No. of episodes: 6

Production
- Production company: December Media

Original release
- Network: ABC2
- Release: 8 December 2016

Fancy Boy is an Australian six-part sketch comedy television series which screened on ABC2 from 8 December 2016 to 12 January 2017.

It is produced by Nicole Minchin, series produced by Declan Fay, executive produced by Stuart Menzies and directed by Colin Cairnes. The soundtrack is composed by Glenn Richards.

== Cast ==
=== Main / recurring ===
- John Campbell
- Stuart Daulman
- Henry Stone
- Jonathan Schuster
- Greg Larsen
- Anne Edmonds
- Kim Jong Un

=== Guests ===
- Ronny Chieng as Accountant
- Anna McGahan as Karen / Rachel
- Damien Power as Head Monk / Thomas
- Jack Charles as Oracle
- Josh Quong Tart as President Ryan
- George Kapiniaris as Joe
- Gerry Connolly as Ian's Dad
- Tony Nikolakopoulos as Alfonse
- Tegan Higginbotham as Addiction Counsellor

== See also ==
- List of Australian television series
