= The Set (TV series) =

2018–2021 Australian music TV series

- Presented by: Linda Marigliano; Dylan Alcott
- Country of origin: Australia
- Original language: English
- No. of series: 3
- No. of episodes: 21

Production
- Production location: Sydney

Original release
- Network: ABC
- Release: 31 October 2018 – 9 October 2019
- Release: 24 April – 26 June 2021

Related
- The Full Set

The Set is an Australian live music television program that airs on the ABC. It is hosted by Linda Marigliano and Dylan Alcott. The show features performances from guest artists and is filmed in front of a live audience, designed to reflect a house party environment.

The program premiered on Wednesday 31 October 2018 at 9:30pm, in an initial 4-episode series.

The program returned for a second series in 2019, commencing on Wednesday 28 August. A third season of the show was aired in 2021 on Saturday 24 April.

== Episodes ==
=== Series overview ===
Series	Episodes	Originally released	
Series	Episodes	First released	Last released
1	4	31 October 2018	21 November 2018
2	7	28 August 2019	9 October 2019
3	10	24 April 2021	26 June 2021

=== Series 1 (2018) ===
No.	Guests	Original release date
1	Vera Blue, Wafia and Baker Boy	31 October 2018
2	The Presets, DZ Deathrays and Kult Kyss	7 November 2018
3	The Rubens, Jack River and B Wise	14 November 2018
4	Ball Park Music, Angie McMahon and Tia Gostelow	21 November 2018

=== Series 2 (2019) ===
No.	Guests	Original release date
5	Amy Shark, Thelma Plum and The Teskey Brothers	28 August 2019
6	Cosmo's Midnight, Genesis Owusu and Press Club	4 September 2019
7	Illy, Dune Rats and Thandi Phoenix	11 September 2019
8	Middle Kids, Kasey Chambers and Adrian Eagle	18 September 2019
9	Jessica Mauboy, Kira Puru and Didirri	25 September 2019
10	Northeast Party House, Polish Club and Alex the Astronaut	2 October 2019
11	Boy and Bear, Marlon Williams and Montaigne	9 October 2019

=== Series 3 (2021) ===
No.	Guests	Original release date
12	Missy Higgins and Birdz	24 April 2021
13	Genesis Owusu and The Chats	1 May 2021
14	Hiatus Kaiyote and Emma Donovan	8 May 2021
15	Lime Cordiale and Miiesha	15 May 2021
16	You Am I and Fanny Lumsden	22 May 2021
17	Paul Kelly, Eves Karydas and Ziggy Ramo	29 May 2021
18	Ruel and Jarryd James	5 June 2021
19	The Jungle Giants and Sycco	12 June 2021
20	Julia Stone, Kwame and Tasman Keith	19 June 2021
21	Peking Duk, Jesswar and The Amity Affliction	26 June 2021
