= Aunty Donna =

Australian comedy group

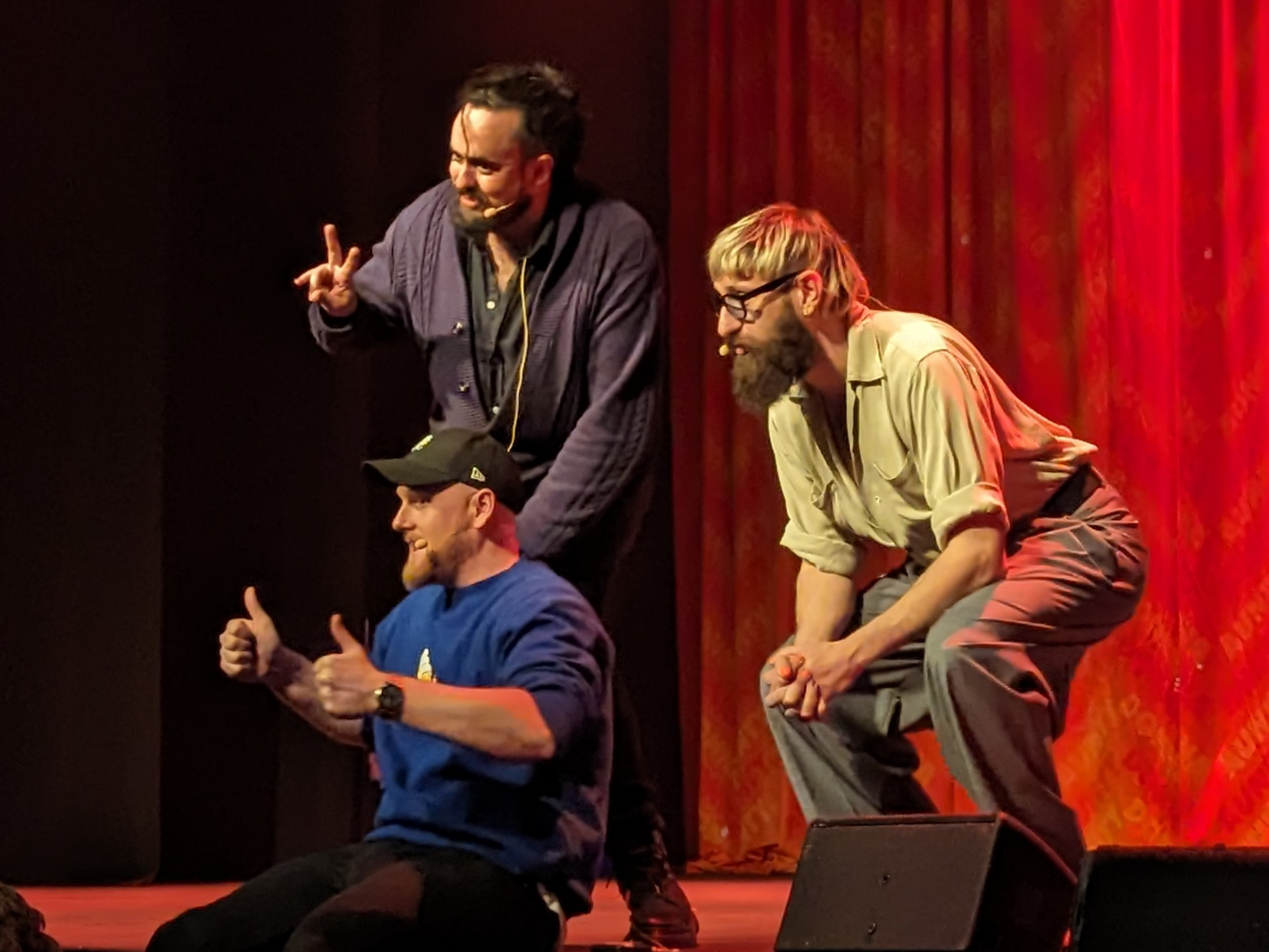
- The three performing members of Aunty Donna (clockwise from top left: Ruane, Bonanno, Kelly) at The Alexandra, Birmingham on the Magical Dead Cat Tour in 2023

Comedy career
- Years active: 2011–present
- Medium: Internet; theatre; television
- Genres: Absurdist comedy; sketch; observational comedy; dark comedy
- Members: Mark Bonanno; Broden Kelly; Zachary Ruane; Max Miller; Thomas Zahariou; Sam Lingham
- Former members: Adrian Dean; Joe Kosky

YouTube information
- Channel: Aunty Donna
- Subscribers: 643,000
- Views: 194 million
- Last updated: 28 November 2025
- Website: auntydonna.com

Aunty Donna is an Australian surrealist comedy group formed in Melbourne in 2011. The group currently consists of performers and writers Mark Bonanno, Broden Kelly and Zachary Ruane, alongside writer and director Sam Lingham, director Max Miller and composer Thomas Zahariou.

Their work spans numerous live shows, a YouTube channel, podcasts, a studio album, the Netflix-produced Aunty Donna's Big Ol' House of Fun, the ABC-produced series Aunty Donna's Coffee Cafe, and the picture book Always Room for Christmas Pud. The group founded Haven't You Done Well Productions together in 2018 to support alternative comedy. As of 2026, this company runs the subscription streaming service and YouTube channel Grouse House, which has a podcast network.

== Influences ==
Members of the group have cited comedians Monty Python, Shaun Micallef, The Mighty Boosh, Nathan Fielder, and Tim & Eric as influences, as well as television series such as Mr. Show with Bob and David and Stella, and programming block Adult Swim.

== History ==
=== 2011–2014: Formation and live shows ===
Aunty Donna was formed in 2011 after its five original members (Mark Bonanno, Broden Kelly, Joe Kosky, Sam Lingham, and Zachary Ruane) met at University of Ballarat's Arts Academy. Adrian Dean also joined as a performer. Trained as actors, the group saw a lack of demand for independent theatre and decided to attempt comedy instead, beginning as live performers. Their first live show, Aunty Donna in Pantsuits, debuted in 2012 at the Melbourne International Comedy Festival (MICF) and was nominated for a Golden Gibbo Award, which pushed the group to continue making comedy. Kelly also recruited his high school friend, composer Thomas Zahariou (Note: Then named Thomas Armstrong) soon after its founding. To perform at the festival, MICF required the group to film a selection of comedy sketches, for which they recruited director Max Miller, who Kelly and Zahariou knew from high school. They created sketches for C31 Melbourne, and began their YouTube channel in 2011 to upload the sketches from C31 and their MICF online.

Joe Kosky and later Adrian Dean departed Aunty Donna to pursue other ventures. Their second live show, Aunty Donna and the Fax Machine Shop, debuted at the Melbourne Fringe Festival in 2012, and won its People's Choice Award.

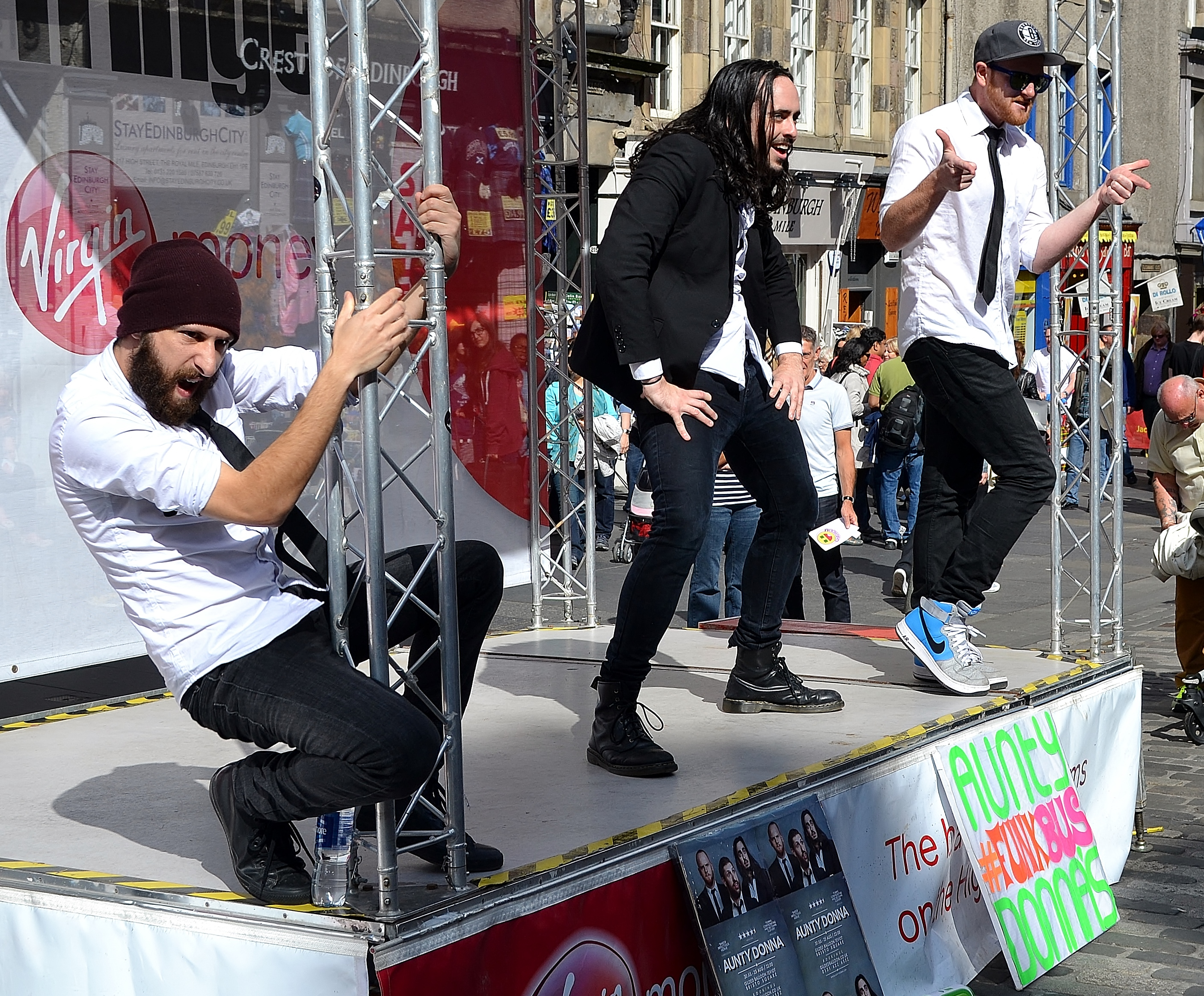
The group perform outside at the Edinburgh Festival Fringe in 2014

2014 saw their third live show, World's Greatest Showbag, at the MICF, as well as a Best Of live show that debuted the group internationally at both the SF Sketchfest and Edinburgh Festival Fringe.

=== 2015–2019: Television pilots, YouTube sketches and The Album ===
In 2015, the group created a self-titled half-hour television pilot for the ABC and Screen Australia as part of the inaugural Fresh Blood Pilot Season comedy initiative, but the series was not picked up. According to Kelly, the pilot was about the experience of Dean leaving the group. They released the sketch "Bikie Wars" on YouTube, featuring John Wood of Blue Heelers fame, which became their most popular video. The Sydney Morning Herald credited the group with successfully converting its online fanbase into "bums on seats" for their live shows.

In 2016, the group released the web series 1999, based on the Y2K panic and funded by Screen Australia as part of their $100,000 Skip Ahead talent development initiative. They were also selected by Comedy Central for its Australian platform and were the first to be launched on the site. The group began the weekly Aunty Donna Podcast. In 2017, the group released a second half-hour comedy pilot, Chaperones, which was not continued into a full series. In April, they starred in the music video for hip-hop duo Horrorshow's "Eat The Cake".

In 2018 the group released a full-length studio comedy album, The Album, which was followed by a national tour in November and October. The Album debuted at number 30 on the Australian charts and received an ARIA nomination for Best Comedy Release. They also released a version of a past live show, New Show, on YouTube, filmed at the Enmore Theatre. The group also released the sketch "Always Room for Christmas Pud", which the Australian Financial Review later said had become "something of a Millennial cultural touchstone in Australia". The sketch would become a running gag for the group, later receiving a family friendly re-release in 2022.

Making use of their production company, the group released the 16-part Glennridge Secondary College web series in 2019, which followed a fictional Australian secondary school. It was nominated for an AACTA Award for the best online drama or comedy.

=== 2020–present: Big Ol' House of Fun, The Magical Dead Cat Tour, and Coffee Cafe ===
In November 2020, Aunty Donna released their Netflix series Aunty Donna's Big Ol' House of Fun. To promote the show, the group erected a replica of the Utah monolith in Melbourne with help from YouTubers I Did a Thing and Aleksa Vulović. Neil Patrick Harris and RuPaul both praised the show.

In March 2021, Aunty Donna hosted the Opening Night Comedy Allstars Supershow at the MICF.

2022 saw The Magical Dead Cat Tour, the group's first live tour in three years after it was delayed by COVID-19 lockdowns, covering Australia and New Zealand. Later in the year, the group released Always Room for Christmas Pud, a picture book based on their popular YouTube video of the same name. They hosted the musical comedy gala at Sydney's Just for Laughs comedy festival in December. For Christmas, the group released a real "$30 Bottle Of Wine", in reference to their 2016 sketch of the same name.

In August 2022, the group announced that they had been signed by ABC to create a new sitcom TV series depicting them running a café in the Melbourne laneways. The show was later named Aunty Donna's Coffee Cafe and was released on the 12 April 2023. Alongside the main members of the group, the series starred Gaby Seow, Sally-Anne Upton, Michelle Brasier, Vidya Rajan, and Mish Wittrup.

In 2023, the trio provided voices for characters in the Australian version of the 2023 film Dungeons & Dragons: Honor Among Thieves. After returning from the tour, the group began to release a three-hour Dungeons & Dragons campaign via Patreon in November, hosted by Bonanno and titled The McMuffin MacGuffin. However, the hard drive holding the footage was destroyed, leading to the release of only one episode and the filming of a second campaign featuring writer Sam Lingham. They provided voices for the animated sci-fi comedy feature film Lesbian Space Princess, which premiered at the Adelaide Film Festival in October 2024. Alongside their work as members of Aunty Donna, Bonanno, Kelly, and Ruane also branched out into outside ventures during this period.

In August 2025, the group began their world tour of their show Drem, which featured around 50 shows. The group stated that this would be their last significant live show "for a good while", as they were planning to focus on their platform Grouse House after the tour.

== Haven't You Done Well Productions ==
Haven't You Done Well Productions is a production company established by the members of Aunty Donna in 2018, with the aim of assisting and educating online creatives, who would usually struggle to find a platform due to being too "weird", to develop and produce comedy projects and to ensure they retain ownership of their own works. The company was mentored by Andy Lee. In 2019, it received funding from Screen Australia, sharing a pool of $1.2 million for sector and talent development. The company produced the Aunty Donna webseries Glennridge Secondary College and co-produced Aunty Donna's Big Ol' House of Fun and Aunty Donna's Coffee Cafe. In March 2025, former The Axis of Awesome member Lee Naimo, who had helped to fund the company's production of Hug The Sun (2021) at his previous job at Screen Australia, joined the company as its Head of Creative.

=== Grouse House ===
Grouse House is a YouTube channel operated by Haven't You Done Well Productions, intended to support up-and-coming comedians by hosting their absurdist, experimental comedy on the platform.

Grouse House has produced several comedy webseries which are hosted on the YouTube channel Grouse House, including Hug The Sun (2021) directed by Aaron McCann and featuring Ben Russell and Xavier Michelides, Hot Department: Dark Web (2022) featuring comedy duo Hot Department, and Finding Yeezus (2022), a six-part documentary web series that revealed the identity of the creator of the 2013 video game Kanye Quest 3030 starring Cameron James and Alexei Toliopoulos and directed by Max Miller. The five-part comedy Descent (2024), set on a submarine and featuring comedians Millie Holten, Madi Savage, and Ella Lawry, was also released on the channel, as well as nostalgic TV parody series Gocsy's Classics featuring Aaron Gocs. The Most Upsetting Guessing Game in the World (MUGG) is another of its outputs, featuring guests such as Daniel Sloss and Nick Cody. In 2025, Grouse House released So You Wanna Win a P*nis Pump? (SYWWAPP), a four-episode quiz show described as a mix between Taskmaster and Game Changer, hosted by Demi Lardner and featuring guests such as Paul F. Tompkins, Tom Cardy and Becky Lucas. Grouse House has released six different pilot episodes by comedian Greg Larsen.

In August 2025, it was announced that a subscription service based on and named after Grouse House was to be trialled over the subsequent months and fully launched in early 2026. It would be similar in form to that of Dropout, a US streaming service derived from comedy company CollegeHumor. While the content already on the Grouse House channel is to remain available for free on YouTube, new content will only be available through this service. Presently, Naimo has stated Grouse House's focus on small-budget shiny-floor productions such as gameshows, improv and interview shows. Much of Aunty Donna's proceeds from its Drem world tour are expected to go toward Grouse House. In 2026, The Grouse House Podcast Network was launched, featuring the podcasts Ratbag with Mel & Sam, The Mish & Zach Podcast and The Footy with Broden Kelly, all distributed through Acast. In March, their own Aunty Donna Podcast was also brought under this network. The animated short-form sketch comedy series Finally, a Show About Men!, a satire about masculinity produced by husbands Samuel Leighton-Dore and Bradley Tennant of Sad Man Studio with financial backing from Screen Queensland’s Online Production Grants, was released on the Grouse House YouTube channel in May.

=== Other ventures ===
In 2022 Screen Australia funded its production of science fiction romantic comedy The Alien Abduction of Emily Hill, In 2023, they produced Fairbairn Films' Fairbairn in the City, again financed by Screen Australia's Skip Ahead funding. Screen Australia in 2023 also funded the creation of Crime Casters, a comedy about a true crime podcaster; in October 2026 this was announced as a Haven't You Done Well Productions feature film starring Charlotte Nicdao, David Wenham, and the members of Aunty Donna, as well as Shaun Micallef, Kate McLennan and Kate McCartney, Madeleine Sami, Alexei Toliopoulous, Greg Larsen and Zoë Coombs Marr.

In June 2024, the company announced a commercial division, having already filmed ads for Samsung, PlayStation, Heineken, Coles and a campaign for a collaboration between Lego and Sega. The output of this arm includes sketches, podcasts and creator partnerships for brands.

== Works ==
=== Stage shows ===
Year	Show title	Tours
2012	Aunty Donna in Pantsuits	Melbourne International Comedy Festival (MICF)
2012	Aunty Donna and the Fax Machine Shop (A Murder Mystery)	Melbourne Fringe Festival
2013	Aunty Donna and the Fax Machine Shop	MICF
2013	Aunty Donna (Best Of)	Sydney (Factory Theatre)
2014	Aunty Donna's World's Greatest Showbag	MICF
2014	Aunty Donna (Best Of)	Edinburgh Festival Fringe, SF Sketchfest
2015	Aunty Donna (Self Titled)	MICF, Sydney Comedy Festival, Edinburgh Festival Fringe, London (Soho Theatre), regional UK tour
2016	Aunty Donna: New Show	MICF, Sydney Comedy Festival, Brisbane Comedy Festival, Perth Fringe, New Zealand International Comedy Festival, Edinburgh Festival Fringe, London (Soho Theatre), North America
2017	Aunty Donna: Big Boys	MICF, Canberra Comedy Festival, Sydney Comedy Festival, Brisbane Comedy Festival, Perth Fringe, Adelaide Fringe, New Zealand International Comedy Festival, Edinburgh Festival Fringe, London (Leicester Square Theatre), North America
2018	Aunty Donna: Glennridge Secondary College	MICF, Canberra Comedy Festival, Sydney Comedy Festival, New Zealand International Comedy Festival
2018	Aunty Donna: The Album Tour	Australian tour
2019	Aunty Donna: Glennridge Graduation Party	Australian tour
2022–2023	The Magical Dead Cat Tour	Australia and New Zealand tour followed by world tour of Australia, UK, Ireland, USA and Canada
2025	DREM	World tour of Australia, New Zealand, UK, Ireland, USA and Canada

=== YouTube ===
In December 2012, Aunty Donna created Aunty Donna's Rumpus Room, a seven-part web series which originally aired as segments on C31 Melbourne and its YouTube channel. Since then they have created a number of sketch series', some of which share material from their live shows.

- Rumpus Room (2012)
- Fortnightly Fap Off (2013)
- Fapé in the Cafe (2013)
- Fresh Blood (2014)
- 1999 (2015/2016)
- Trendy (2016)
- Ripper Aussie Summer (2017)
- BEST CONTENT EVER!!1! (2017)
- Aunty Donna: The Album (2018)
- Camp Bush Camp (2018)
- Glennridge Secondary College (2019)
- The Rove Tapes (2020)
- The House Series (2022)

=== The Aunty Donna Podcast ===
The group began a self-titled podcast in 2016, releasing weekly episodes. It usually involves improvised character comedy with satirical premises, and has been described by Wonderland as "hugely popular". It became part of The Grouse House Podcast Network in March 2026.

=== Music ===
In 2018, Aunty Donna announced they would be releasing their debut album The Album on 6 April 2018. On 9 February 2018, Aunty Donna released the first single from the album, "Chuffed (Dad Song)", and accompanying video. The album debuted at No. 30 on the ARIA Albums Chart.

== Discography ==
=== Studio albums ===
Title	Details	Peak positions
Title	Details	AUS
The Album	Release date: April 2018; Label: etcetc (ETCETCD064); Formats: CD, LP, digital	30
Aunty Donna's Big Ol' House of Fun (Music from the Netflix Comedy Series)	Release date: January 2021; Label: etcetc; Formats: digital	
Aunty Donna's Coffee Café	Release date: 19 May 2023; Label: ABC; Formats: digital	

== Filmography ==
Year	Title	Role
2023	Dungeons & Dragons: Honor Among Thieves	Corpses
2025	Lesbian Space Princess	Straight White Maliens

== Awards and nominations ==
Award nominations for Aunty Donna
Year	Award	Category	Nominee(s)	Result	Ref.
2012	Melbourne International Comedy Festival	Golden Gibbo Award	Aunty Donna in Pantsuits	Nominated	
2012	Melbourne Fringe Festival	People's Choice Award	Aunty Donna and the Fax Machine Shop	Nominated	
2013	Melbourne WebFest	Melbourne's Best Prize	Aunty Donna's Rumpus Room	Won	
2014	9th AACTA Awards	Best Online Drama or Comedy	Glennridge Secondary College	Nominated	
2016	Melbourne WebFest	Best Ensemble	1999	Won	
2016	Sydney Comedy Festival	Director's Choice	Aunty Donna	Won	
2017	Helpmann Awards	Best Comedy Performer	Big Boys	Nominated	
2018	ARIA Music Awards	Best Comedy Release	Aunty Donna: The Album	Nominated	
2019	Melbourne WebFest	Best Australian Comedy	Glennridge Secondary College	Won	
2021	11th AACTA Awards	Best Narrative Comedy Series	Aunty Donna's Big Ol' House of Fun	Nominated	
2021	11th AACTA Awards	Best Comedy Performer	Mark Bonanno	Nominated	
2021	11th AACTA Awards	Best Comedy Performer	Broden Kelly	Nominated	
2021	11th AACTA Awards	Best Original Score in Television	Aunty Donna's Big Ol' House Of Fun - Episode 1: Housemates	Nominated	
