= Don't Hug Me I'm Scared (TV series) =

British adult puppet comedy horror television series

- Genre: Adult puppeteering; Comedy horror; Musical; Surreal humour
- Created by: Becky Sloan; Joe Pelling; Baker Terry
- Based on: Don't Hug Me I'm Scared by: Becky Sloan; and Joe Pelling
- Written by: Becky Sloan; Joe Pelling; Baker Terry; Roy; Sam Campbell
- Directed by: Becky Sloan; Joe Pelling; Baker Terry; Roy
- Starring: Becky Sloan; Joe Pelling; Baker Terry
- Composers: Charlie Pelling; Joe Pelling; Baker Terry
- Country of origin: United Kingdom
- Original language: English
- No. of series: 1
- No. of episodes: 6

Production
- Executive producer: James Stevenson Bretton
- Producers: Hugo Donkin; Charlie Perkins
- Cinematography: Edward Tucker
- Editor: Nick Armstrong
- Camera setup: Single-camera
- Running time: 23–24 minutes
- Production companies: Blink Industries; Conaco (2018); Super Deluxe (2018)

Original release
- Network: All 4
- Release: 23 September 2022
- Network: Channel 4
- Release: 30 September – 14 October 2022
- Network: Dropout TV
- Release: 20 March – 29 May 2026

Don't Hug Me I'm Scared is a 2022 British adult puppet comedy horror television series created by Joe Pelling, Becky Sloan and Baker Terry, and produced by Blink Industries. It was released on All 4 on 23 September 2022 and is based on the web series of the same name. Its six episodes are themed around surrealism and dark humour, and revolve around three characters: Red Guy, Yellow Guy and Duck.

On 6 December 2024, the series was made available internationally through the official Don't Hug Me I'm Scared website for a one-time fee, granting viewers access for up to three years. As of that date, the creators confirmed that there are no plans for a second series of the programme, but they remain open to producing more self-funded Don't Hug Me I'm Scared content in the future. On 23 February 2026, it was announced that the series and original webseries would begin streaming on the streaming service Dropout.

== Premise ==
The series revolves around the lives of Red Guy, Yellow Guy and Duck, whose names are not explicitly revealed in the series. Each episode starts off with the three getting a lesson from a teacher about topics including jobs, death, family, friendship, transport and electronics. The teachers are usually manipulative and malicious, and as the episode goes on, the themes explored become more dark and gruesome. At the end, the teacher fails and usually dies, with the three shown to have not learned anything.

== Development ==
=== Previous works ===
From 2011 to 2016, Joe Pelling and Becky Sloan, later along with Baker Terry, created Don't Hug Me I'm Scared, an art project and web series on YouTube. The series consists of six horror-themed puppet videos.

In 2018, a video titled "Wakey Wakey..." was uploaded to the official channel, and teased an upcoming television show, and the pilot premiered at the 2019 Sundance Film Festival. However, the series was later scrapped. In an interview, Terry stated that "we were going to have to actually write jokes that functioned as jokes without a prop in every single instance".

=== Release ===
In July 2020, it was announced that the television series was picked up by Channel 4. In September 2021, Becky Sloan announced that production had finished. On 19 June 2022, a teaser trailer titled "FLY" was uploaded to the YouTube channel, announcing the release date of September. The video gained over 2 million views within 24 hours of release and reached No. 1 trending on YouTube.

The series was released on All 4 on 23 September 2022, postponed from 12 September 2022 following the death of Queen Elizabeth II. In double-bill timeslots, the show was broadcast on linear Channel 4 weekly starting from 30 September. The series also released on their official website for paid access alongside official merchandise on 6 December 2024.

On 23 February 2026, it was announced that the television series would begin streaming on the streaming service Dropout, with biweekly releases starting on 20 March 2026.

== Episodes ==
=== Pilot (2019) ===
A long-form TV pilot was produced in 2018 with Super Deluxe, Conaco and Blink Industries. The pilot premiered at 2019 Sundance Film Festival, appearing in the "Indie Episodic Program 1" alongside other short films. The idea, which involved "current affairs", was later scrapped, and the trailer was removed from the YouTube channel. The setting, which Sloan attributed some roots to South Park, did not have "the timelessness and claustrophobia of the originals". On 13 May 2024, it was announced that the unaired pilot would be screened at the 2024 Sundance Film Festival in London during 6–9 June. However on 14 May 2024, it was revealed that this announcement was a mistake. The screening would actually feature the first episode of the web series, not the unaired pilot. On 19 September 2024, during an In Motion Playgrounds panel, Becky Sloan and Joseph Pelling revealed they were legally unable to release the full pilot. However, the creators showcased concept art from the episode and aired a majority of it sped up for about 15 seconds.

No.	Title	Written and directed by	Original release date
0	"Pilot"	Becky Sloan, Joe Pelling & Baker Terry	2019 (Sundance)
Roommates Red Guy, Yellow Guy, and Duck live simple and repetitive lives in the complacent colourful community of Clayhill. When the town's mayor disappears, everything descends into chaos.

=== Series (2022) ===
No.	Title	Directed by	Written by	Original release date	TV air date
1	"Jobs"	Becky Sloan, Joe Pelling & Baker Terry	Becky Sloan, Joe Pelling, Baker Terry & Sam Campbell	23 September 2022	30 September 2022
Having nothing on their daily schedule, Duck and Yellow Guy try to find something to do, much to Red Guy's dismay. A talking briefcase informs them about the concept of jobs, suggesting several things that they could do before transporting them to a "bits and parts" factory and disappearing into a storage closet. Red Guy stumbles into becoming upper management and Yellow Guy fits right in with his coworkers, while Duck begins to grow unhappy with his job. Duck tries to leave, but is fired by Red Guy and then brainwashed into loving his job by a blue dog-like monster called the Carehound. When he comes back to work, he finds that everyone is now 40 years older and having a retirement party for Yellow Guy. Duck throws Yellow Guy's retirement card into a machine and inadvertently causes Yellow Guy's hand to be caught and crushed in the machine when he tries to retrieve it. Duck gets the First Aid Kit, who is revealed to be the talking briefcase as he finishes his song, transporting the three back to their house and restoring them to their old selves. As they express confusion about everything that just happened, the briefcase rewards them for their work with a coin, which lands directly in Duck's eye.
2	"Death"	Becky Sloan, Joe Pelling & Baker Terry	Becky Sloan, Joe Pelling, Baker Terry & Sam Campbell	23 September 2022	30 September 2022
Duck reads in the newspaper that he is dead because he forgot to drink water. His heart falls out of his body, summoning a talking coffin who helps the friends organise a funeral for Duck. While buried underground, Duck continuously annoys the coffin with various questions and requests. Meanwhile, Red Guy attempts to build a new friend out of a talking blob of clay to replace Duck, though Yellow Guy refuses to accept it. The talking blob of clay, naming itself Stain Edwards, grows into an independent individual, but Red Guy slowly begins to mould it into an exact replica of Duck. Yellow Guy returns to the burial site and digs up the old Duck to bring him back, inadvertently killing the coffin. Yellow and the old Duck return home, only to find Stain Edwards fully morphed into Duck. The two Ducks accept there being "four of us" now, and the group proceeds to start a new show with the two Ducks. However, one of them abruptly kills the other with a shovel, stating that there being four of them "doesn't work".
3	"Family"	Becky Sloan, Joe Pelling & Baker Terry	Becky Sloan, Joe Pelling, Baker Terry & Sam Campbell	23 September 2022	7 October 2022
The three friends have trouble opening a "family pack" of snacks, prompting a pair of twins, Todney and Lily, to arrive to teach them about the concept of families. They invite the friends to their house, introducing them to their father, brother, and grandmother. Duck grows annoyed with the twins' family, so they reject Duck and send him back to his house. Red Guy meets the twins' "family tree", who takes most of his blood to help him find his family. However, when Red Guy actually meets his family, they reject him for being too expressive. Yellow Guy is kidnapped and dressed as the twins' mother, who reveal they only wanted to complete their family to get a family discount on a food delivery. However, Yellow Guy's father Roy arrives, eating the twins and their family while allowing Yellow Guy to escape. The three friends decide that blood relations are unimportant to being a family and manage to open the bag, only to find just two snacks in the bag. Red Guy suggests the trio share when Duck loudly exclaims he wants both.
4	"Friendship"	Becky Sloan, Joe Pelling & Baker Terry	Becky Sloan, Joe Pelling, Baker Terry & Sam Campbell	23 September 2022	7 October 2022
The three friends prepare to go online for their annual "computer day" with Colin the computer, but Yellow Guy cannot remember the password. When Red Guy and Duck insult him for it, a worm named Warren arrives to teach them about what true friendship is. Finally remembering the password, the trio log in and check their emails, with Yellow Guy upset to see he's received none. As a result, he retreats into his own mind to hang out with his "brain friends". Red Guy and Duck convince Warren to enter Yellow Guy's mind to retrieve him, but he decides to stay and hang out with Yellow Guy and his brain friends. However, he quickly annoys Yellow Guy's brain friends into leaving, causing Yellow Guy to retreat further into his mind, with Warren intruding to forcibly befriend Yellow Guy. In the real world, Yellow Guy is slowly melting as Red Guy and Duck find information online about their friend's affliction. Learning that Yellow Guy may have "a worm in his brain", Duck shoves a needle into Yellow Guy's ear, killing Warren. Colin happily bids the trio farewell before gifting them a futuristic-looking computer. The three friends make up and sing together before Yellow Guy accidentally trips and breaks the computer, prompting a fight between them all that lasts throughout the credits.
5	"Transport"	Becky Sloan, Joe Pelling & Baker Terry	Becky Sloan, Joe Pelling, Baker Terry & Sam Campbell	23 September 2022	14 October 2022
Red Guy is bored with staying in the house all day and wants to go on a trip. An elderly train called Choo Choo appears to teach the three about transport, but seemingly dies mid-lesson while transformed into a car. Red Guy, still wanting to leave, manages to start the car and drives through the wall of their house onto a seemingly endless road. The car's satnav tries to direct Red Guy back home, but he presses onward, convincing the other two that leaving their house will be worth it. Later, the car begins to lose fuel, and Choo Choo wakes up as the car's steering wheel. Red Guy feeds him raisins to try and refuel the car, desperate to not go back home. As they continue driving, the world around them glitches into a junkyard before the car breaks down. Now lost, the three friends sit around a fire made from the steering wheel. Yellow Guy appears to hear a woman's voice claiming "...the journey always ends up back at home" as the episode abruptly cuts to a live-action person's hand gently pushing a model of the car back to a model of the friends' house.
6	"Electricity"	Becky Sloan, Joe Pelling & Baker Terry	Becky Sloan, Joe Pelling, Baker Terry & Sam Campbell	23 September 2022	14 October 2022
Red Guy and Duck attempt to shred an electricity bill before a robot called Electracey climbs out of their electrical box to teach them about electricity. Yellow Guy reveals that, like her, he is powered by batteries, and Duck swaps Yellow Guy's old faulty batteries for Electracey's fresh ones, making him more smart and self-aware. Yellow Guy leaves to go upstairs and investigate their teachers' sudden appearances, finding increasingly more "intelligent" versions of Red Guy and Duck alongside several more teachers. He then comes across an old live-action woman named Lesley surrounded by props from previous episodes and a diorama of the house. She gives Yellow Guy a book that supposedly contains all the answers he seeks. Meanwhile, Red Guy and Duck use too much electricity and cause a blackout, getting lost and finding dead versions of all of their previous teachers. Yellow Guy returns with the book, but before he can show them anything, Duck swaps his batteries back with Electracey's. The power to the house is restored, but Yellow Guy loses his newfound intelligence, forgetting all that he found upstairs. He puts the book through Duck's shredder as Duck and Red Guy cheer him on.

== Cast ==
=== Sundance pilot cast ===
- Baker Terry as Yellow Guy, Duck, Key, Mayor Pigface, Policeman, Big Ian, and Fizzy Milk
- Joseph Pelling as Red Guy
- Becky Sloan as Mrs. Grenald, Mud Man, and Ladder

=== Channel 4 series cast ===
- Baker Terry as Yellow Guy, Duck, Briefcase, Andy, Duncan, Bin, Lucky Mo, Family Tree, Roy Gribbleston, Warren The Eagle, Yumpherdinker, Dr. Bushman, Choo Choo, Tony the Talking Clock, Steak, Big Duck and Bigger Duck
- Joseph Pelling as Red Guy, Colin the Computer, Brain Friends Theme Singer, Brain Friends Announcer, Big Red Guy and Bigger Red Guy
- Becky Sloan as Unemployed Brendon, Stain Edwards, Grolton's Chicken Family Tub Discount Commercial Announcer, Brain Friends Theme Singer, First Tooth, The Lump and Electracey
- Vivienne Soan as Lesley
- Leila Navabi as Claire
- Amy Gledhill as Wet Floor Sign
- Kath Hughes as Printer
- Phil Wang as Vending Machine
- Jen Ives as Free Vending Machine
- Chris Cantrill as Safety Video Announcer
- Lolly Adefope as Lift and Mrs. Grelch
- Charlie Perkins as Jenny
- Kevin Eldon as Coffin
- Sue Eves as Brain Friends Theme Singer (uncredited)
- George Fouracres as Lamp, Grolton and Hovris
- Sam Campbell as ID Card and Apple
- Katy Wix as Tissue Box
- Freya Parker as Grandma and Bread
- James Stevenson Bretton as Lily and Todney
- Liam Williams as Market Man
- Emma Sidi as Bubble Bath Memory
- Kiell Smith-Bynoe as Saturdavid
- Johnny White Really-Really as Shy Imaginary Older Brother
- Charlie Pelling as Brain Friends Theme Singer
- Chris Hayward as Instructional Tape Announcer
- Katie Kvinge as GPS
- Jimmy Slim as Time Child
- Jamie Demetriou as Safe
- Michael Stranney as Mirror
- Beattie Hartley as Experimented Creature
- Jason Forbes as Boundary Hand
- Natasha Hodgson as Rock
- Nathan Foad as Toilet

== Reception ==
Don't Hug Me I'm Scared was commended by critics for its use of surreal humour and horror.

Lucy Mangan from The Guardian stated that the series is "clever, bleak, charming, grotesque and funny." Sean Mullins from Webster Journal called it a "wonderfully weird puppet show". Toussaint Egan from Polygon stated that "the series hasn't missed a single beat in its transition from Internet shock humor du jour to a full-fledged animated series". Nicholas Vidal from The Montclarion stated that "it is one of the most interesting and creative things to release this year". Brittney Bender from Bleeding Cool gave the series a 10/10, saying that it "perfectly encapsulates the absurdity and horror of the modern world through the lens of a multi-colored puppet nightmare of epic proportions".

Don't Hug Me I'm Scared has been named as one of the best TV shows of 2022 by several publications. The Telegraph ranked it at number 20, saying it was "unlucky not to be (in the top 10)". The Guardian ranked it at number 31, quoting Mangan's review. Radio Times ranked it at number 42, praising its "creepy and mysterious spin on vintage children's television, brought vividly to life through inventive crafts and puppetry".

=== Awards and nominations ===
Year	Award	Category	Nominee(s)	Result	Ref.
2023	British Academy Television Craft Awards	Best Production Design	Joe Pelling, Becky Sloan	Won	
2023	British Academy Television Craft Awards	Best Costume Design	Joe Pelling, Becky Sloan	Nominated	
2023	Annecy International Animation Film Festival	Best TV Production	Don't Hug Me I'm Scared (for "Family")	Nominated	
2023	National Comedy Awards	Best Scripted Comedy Series	Don't Hug Me I'm Scared	Nominated	
2023	Broadcast Awards	Best Original Programme	Don't Hug Me I'm Scared	Nominated	
