= Talia (given name) =

- Gender: Feminine
- Language: Hebrew, Aramaic, Greek, Latin

Origin
- Meaning: "dew of God", "lamb", "to bloom"

Other names
- Alternative spelling: Taaliah, Tahlia, Tahliah, Tahlyah, Taiyla, Taliah, Talie, Taliea, Taliya, Talya, Tayleeah, Taylia
- Variant form: Talita
- Nicknames: Tali, Tally
- Related names: Thalia, Avital

Talia is a Modern Hebrew feminine given name, as well as a variant spelling of Thalia and a short form of Natalia.

Jews interpret it as a Hebrew combination of ṭal ('dew') and the theophoric suffix -yāh, meaning 'dew of God'. Yehotal, a theophoric prefix combined with -ṭal, is recorded as both a masculine and a feminine name in Elephantine papyri; Avital and Hamutal are feminine names in Biblical Hebrew, but their etymologies are unknown, with proposals for Hamutal ranging from "my father-in-law is protection" to "dew of Ḥammu". Talya (טַלְיָא or טַלְיָה) referred to a male youth in Aramaic.

== People with the given name ==
=== Talia ===
- Talia Amar, Israeli pianist and composer
- Talia Balsam, American actress
- Talia Castellano, American internet celebrity
- Talia Chetrit, American artist and photographer
- Talia Chiarelli, Canadian gymnast
- Talia DellaPeruta, American soccer player
- Talia Fowler, Australian dancer
- Talia Gabarra, American soccer player
- Talia Gibson, Australian tennis player
- Talia Hibbert, British novelist
- Talia Jane, American writer and labor activist
- Talia Lavin, American journalist and author
- Talia Leman, American nonprofit organization executive
- Talia Lugacy, American film director, writer and producer
- Talia Mar, British singer-songwriter and internet personality
- Talia Marshall, New Zealand writer
- Talia Martin, Australian sprinter
- Talia Ng, Canadian badminton player
- Talia Or, Israeli-German operatic soprano
- Talia Radan, Australian rules footballer
- Talia Reese, American comedian
- Talia Ryder, American actress
- Talia Schlanger, Canadian radio broadcaster
- Talia Shapira, Israeli actress, singer, comedian and writer
- Talia Shire, American actress
- Talia Sommer, Israeli footballer
- Talia Suskauer, American stage actress
- Talia von Oelhoffen, American basketball player
- Talia White, Canadian soccer player
- Talia Younis, Australian soccer player
- Talia Zucker, Australian actress
- FKA Twigs, English singer and dancer born Tahliah Barnett

=== Fictional characters ===
- Queen Talia, in the video game Star Wars: Knights of the Old Republic
- Talia, the dormant princess in an early version of the Sleeping Beauty legend
- Talia al Ghul, from DC Comics
- Talia Gladys, in Mobile Suit Gundam SEED Destiny
- Talia Parra, the titular character of the teen sitcom Talia in the Kitchen
- Talia Patapoutian, a Season 4 contestant in Fetch! with Ruff Ruffman
- Talia Morgan, on The Young and the Restless
- Talia Sahid, on the American soap opera One Life to Live
- Talia Winters, on the television series Babylon 5
- Talia Wagner, daughter of Nightcrawler and The Scarlet Witch in an alternate universe of X-Men
- Lady Tahlia, in the children's book Curious George (book)
- Talia, a main character in LoliRock
- Talia, Misha Bachynskyi's fianceé in the musical Ride the Cyclone
- Talia Yang, in the anime Cyberpunk Edgerunners 2

== See also ==
- Talia (disambiguation)
- Thalia (disambiguation)
