= SRTV =

SRTV may refer to:

- one of the following television stations:
  - Star Ray TV in Toronto, Ontario
  - Romanian Television, the Romanian public television
  - the student run television station at the University of California, San Diego, which originated such programs as Live Hot Puppet Chat and various shows by The Koala
- the Department of the Army's Soldiers Media Center that produces radio and television programming (Soldiers Radio and Television)
- Storm Search and Rescue Tactical Vehicle, US. Air Force ATV
