= Talia =

Talia may refer to:

- Talia (given name)
- Talia (surname)
- Talia, Lebanon, a town
- Talia, South Australia, a locality in the District Council of Elliston
- Talia Station, a pastoral lease in South Australia
- Talia (grape), an alternative name for the wine grape Trebbiano
- Talia (song), a song by King Princess
- "Talia", a song from the musical Ride the Cyclone

== See also ==
- Taliya, the third largest mobile phone network operator in Iran
- Thalia (disambiguation)
