= Thalia Theatre =

Thalia Theatre and Thalia Theater may refer to:

- Thalia Theater (Hamburg), in Germany
- Thalia Theatre (Paramaribo), in Suriname
- Thalia-Theater (Wuppertal), in Germany
- Leonard Nimoy Thalia, Symphony Space, in New York City, U.S.
- Bowery Theatre, New York City, U.S., later renamed to Thalia Theatre

== See also ==
- Thalia (disambiguation)
- Thalia (Muse), the muse of comedy, for whom the above theaters are named
- Thalias Kompagnons, a puppet theatre in Nuremberg, Germany
- Thalia Hall (disambiguation)
