= Red Guy =

Red Guy may refer to:

- Red Guy, a character in British web series Don't Hug Me I'm Scared
- The Red Guy, a character in American animated series Cow and Chicken and I Am Weasel
