= Nikolai Zykov Theatre =

Puppet theatre founded in Moscow

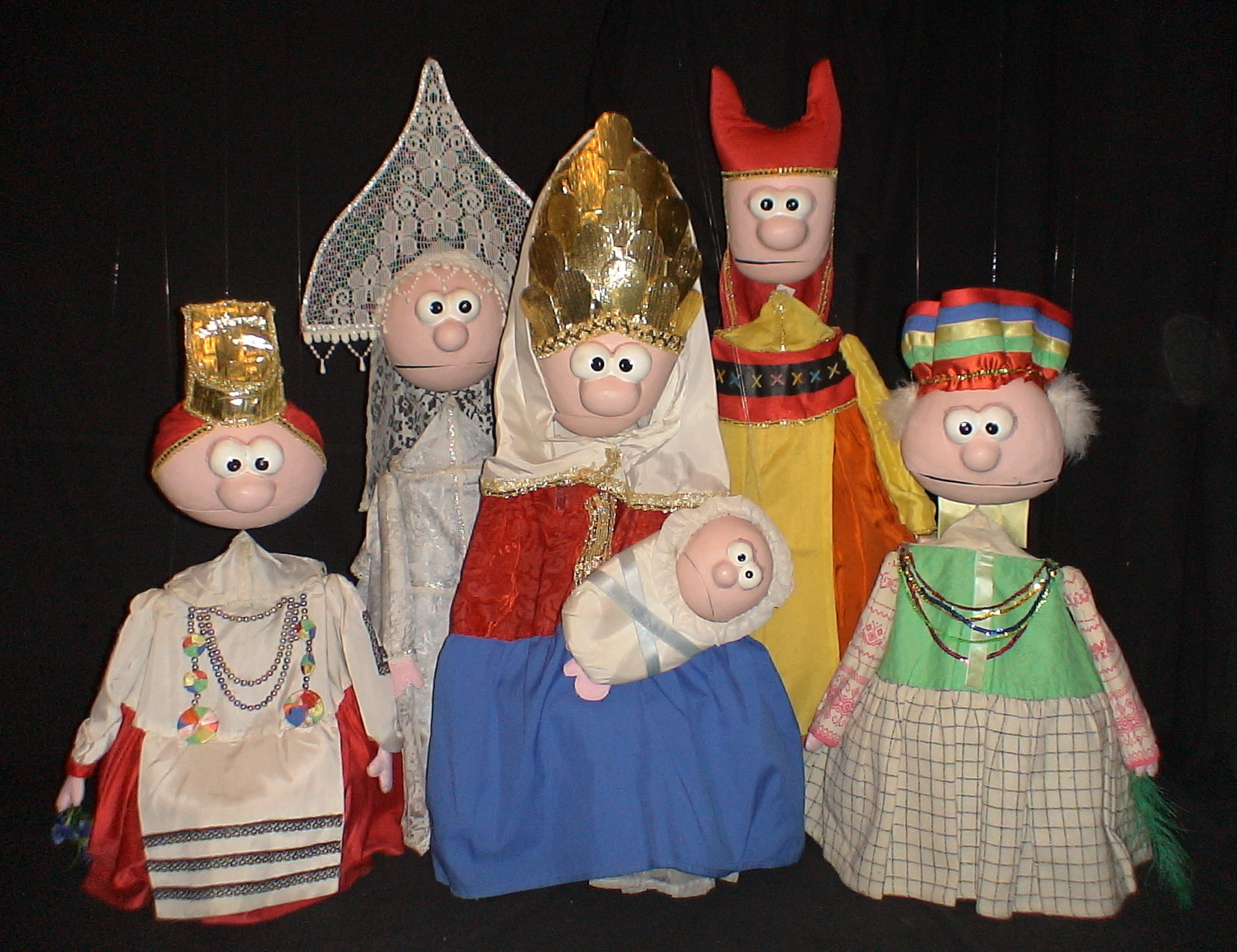
Performance "The Magic World of Marionettes" (1993), Nikolai Zykov Theatre

Nikolai Zykov Theatre (Russian: Театр Николая Зыкова) - puppet theatre founded in Moscow by Nikolai Zykov, a Soviet and Russian actor, director, artist, designer, puppet-maker, master puppeteer.

== History ==
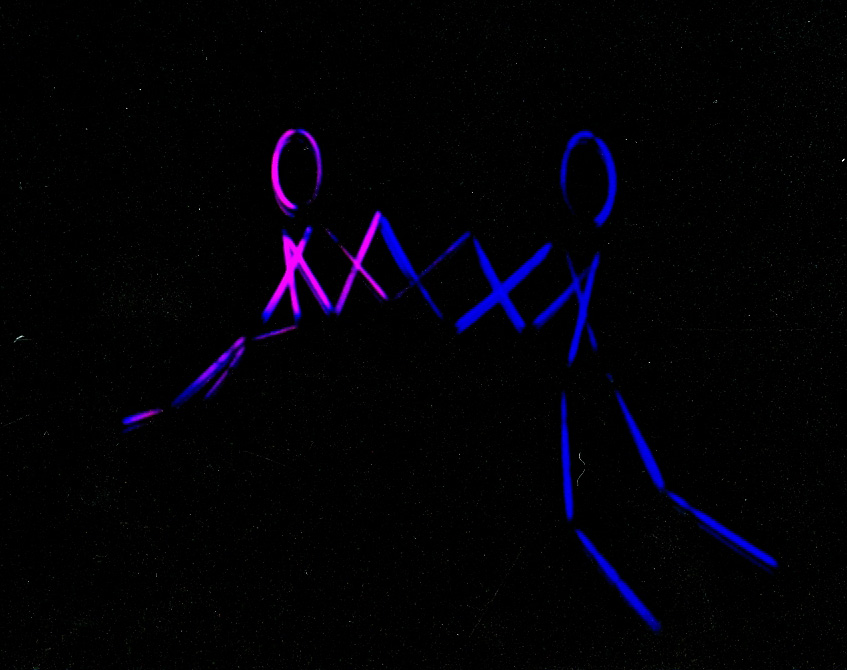
Histoire d'amour (2003), flying marionettes, Nikolai Zykov Theatre

When Zykov was five years old, his parents took him to the Puppet Theatre of Sergey Obraztsov. After the show, Zykov created his own theatre in his house and presented puppet performances for his parents and his younger sister. At that time he did not make puppets by himself. Instead, he took details of toys and inter-connected them with wire.

Zykov began making puppets for his performances in 1977. In 1980, he made his first puppet vignette. In 1985, he created his first solo puppet performance and founded his own professional Nikolai Zykov Theatre.

== Puppets ==
Zykov constantly developed the technology and has created many new construction and technological innovations for experimental marionettes, marionettes-transformers, radio-controlled puppets, experimental giant puppet constructions.

== Performances ==
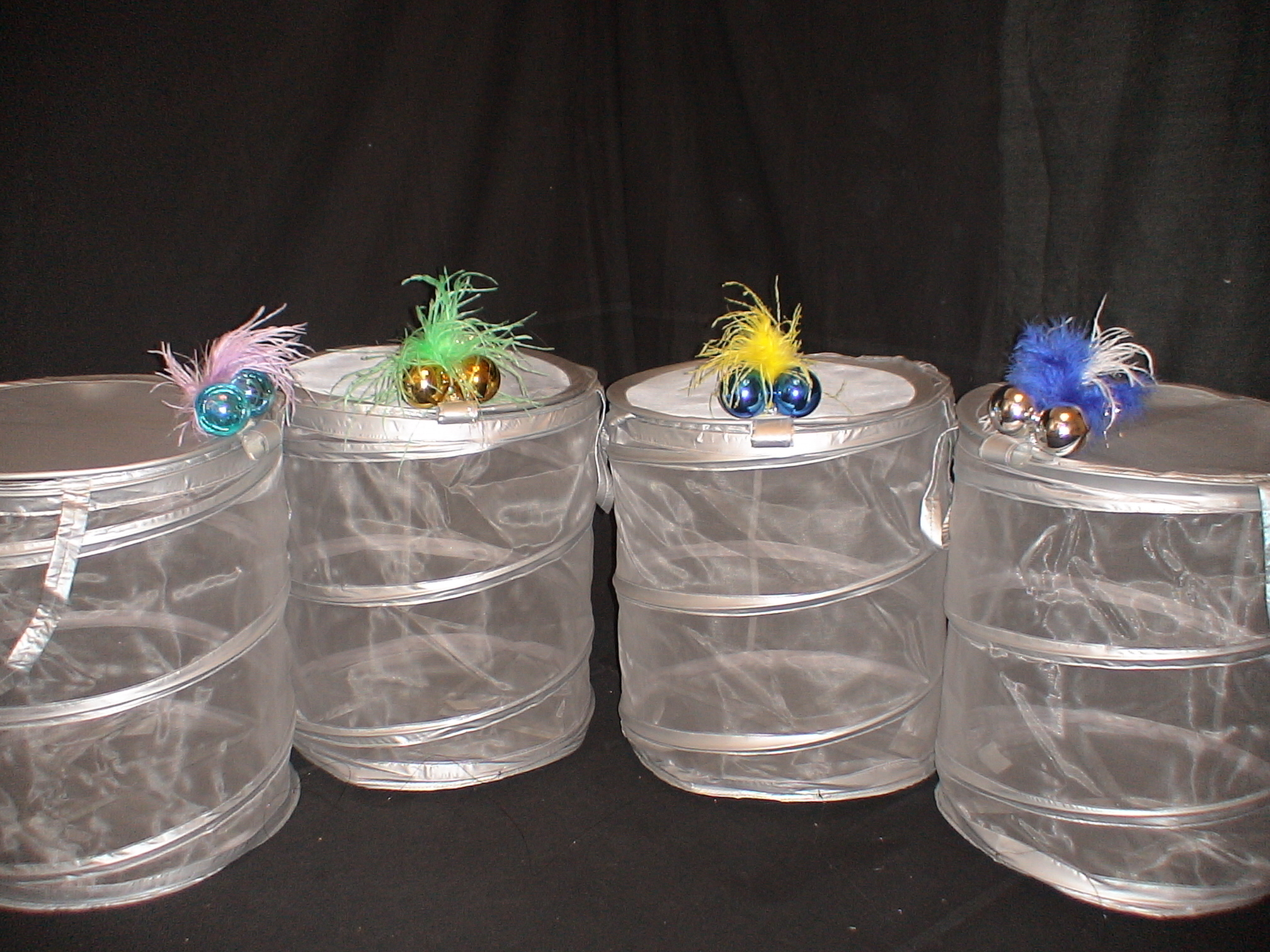
Performance "Puppets, 21st Century" (2012), Nikolai Zykov Theatre

Nikolai Zykov Theatre offers 18 puppet performances for audience of all ages. These performances include:

- "Cabaret of Metamorphoses"
- "New Animation"
- "The Search for Dinosaur"
- "New Year Puppet Show"
- "Dinosaur and his friends"
- "Giant and others"
- "Cosmic adventure"
- "The Magic World of Marionettes"
- "From Prehistoric Man to Aliens"
- "Radio-controlled Puppet Show"
- "Exclusive Show"
- "Light Puppet Show"
- "Russian puppets"
- "Puppet Carnival"
- "Treasures of the East"
- "Puppet Bach Concert"
- "Children Party"
- "Puppet Divertissement"

== Master classes ==
Nikolai Zykov Theatre offers 2 master classes for professionals and puppet lovers:

- "Marionettes: today and tomorrow"
- "Workshop of Miracles"

== Tours ==
Zykov has performed in more than 40 countries around the world. These include:

- Argentina
- Brazil
- Venezuela
- Mexico
- United States
- Iceland
- Estonia
- Latvia
- Byelorussia
- Ukraine
- Poland
- Germany
- Belgium
- France
- Spain
- Italy
- Austria
- Czech Republic
- Slovakia
- Hungary
- Russia
- Bulgaria
- Greece
- Cyprus
- Turkey
- Israel
- Egypt
- South Africa
- Mauritius
- Seychelles
- Iran
- Kazakhstan
- Uzbekistan
- Tajikistan
- Afghanistan
- Pakistan
- India
- Sri Lanka
- Singapore
- Taiwan
- China
- South Korea
- Japan

== Awards ==
- Diplomas of several competitions and festivals in Russia
- "Arts Innovation" award of the 12th China Shanghai International Arts Festival and the 2nd Shanghai International Puppet Festival Golden Magnolia (2010)
- "Excellent Show" award of World UNIMA Congress and Festival (2012)
- "Performance" award of Asia-Pacific UNIMA commission (2014)

== See also ==
- Nikolai Zykov
- Puppetry
- Adult puppeteering
