= Thalia =

Thalia, Thalía, Thaleia or Thalian may refer to:

== People ==
- Thalia (given name), including a list of people with the name

== Mythological and fictional characters ==
- Thalia (Grace), one of the three Graces (Charities)
- Thalia (Muse), the muse of comedy and idyllic poetry
- Thalia (Nereid), one of the fifty daughters of Nereus and Doris
- Thalia (nymph), daughter of Hephaestus, and minor goddess of vegetation
- Thalia Menninger, a fictional character from the TV series The Many Loves of Dobie Gillis
- Thalia Grace, in mythology novels by Rick Riordan

== Places ==
- Thalia, Victoria, Australia
- Thalia, Texas, U.S.
- Thalia, Virginia, U.S.

== Arts and entertainment ==
- Thalia Awards, issued by the Czech Actors' Association
- Thalia (German magazine), a former German magazine
- Thalia (Swedish magazine), avant-garde theatre, music and literary magazine
- Thalia, a book by Arius in the 1st century AD
- The Muse Thalia, a painting by Michele Pannonio c. 1546
- Thalía (1990 album), by Thalía
- Thalía (2002 album), by Thalía
- Thalía (2013 album), by Thalía
- Thalía (English-language album), by Thalía, 2003

== Flora and fauna ==
- Thalia (tunicate), a genus of marine invertebrate animals
- Thalia (plant), a plant genus
- Thalia's shrew, a species of mammal
- Narcissus 'Thalia', a cultivar of daffodil

== Other uses ==
- Thalia (bookstore), in Germany, Switzerland and Austria
- 23 Thalia, an asteroid
- HMS Thalia, the name of three ships of the Royal Navy
- MV Thalia, the name of two German ships
- Renault Thalia, alternative name of the Renault Symbol car
- Thalia, another name for the Trebbiano grape
- The Thalians, American mental health organization
- Thalia Waste Management, a UK-based waste management company formerly known as AmeyCespa prior to the Amey Group being sold in 2022.

== See also ==
- Talia (disambiguation)
- Thalia Hall (disambiguation)
- Thalia Theatre (disambiguation)
- Thaleia, a genus of gastropods
