= River Center (disambiguation) =

River Center, or variants thereof, can refer to:

- RiverCenter for the Performing Arts, a modern performance space in Columbus, Georgia
- Davenport RiverCenter, a convention center complex located in Davenport, Iowa
- Baton Rouge River Center, a convention center complex located in Baton Rouge, Louisiana
- RiverCentre, a convention center located in Saint Paul, Minnesota
- Valley River Center, a shopping mall in Eugene, Oregon
- Rivercenter, a shopping mall in San Antonio, Texas
