= Nikolai Zykov =

Russian actor and director (born 1965)

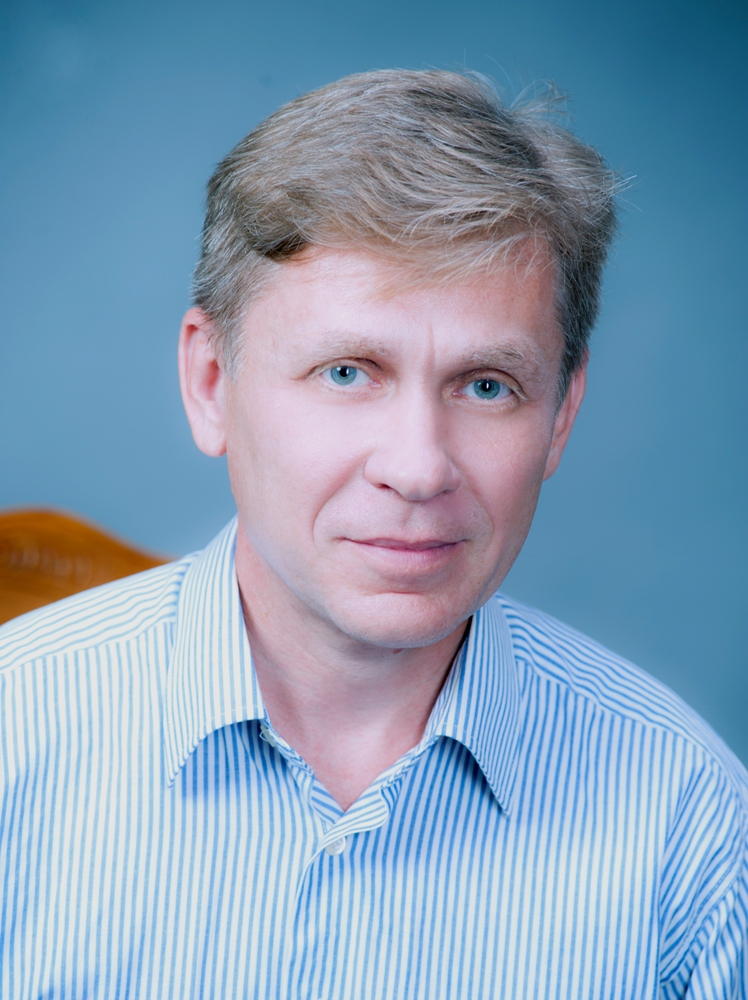
- Born: May 8, 1965 (age 60); Moscow, Russian SFSR, Soviet Union
- Citizenship: USSR, Russia
- Occupations: actor, director, artist, designer, puppet-maker, master puppeteer
- Website: www.zykov.ru

Nikolai Zykov (Russian: Николай Зыков) (born May 8, 1965) is a Soviet and Russian actor, director, artist, designer, puppet-maker, and master puppeteer.

== Personal background ==
Nikolai Zykov was born in 1965 in Moscow in a family of engineers, whose life was not related to art. He is the son of Viktor Zykov, who is a scientist-physics, inventor, and Candidate of Sciences, and Tatiana Zykova (née Smyslova), who is an engineer-technologist and teacher.

When Zykov was five years old, his parents took him to the Puppet Theatre of Sergey Obraztsov, who is the great grand-uncle of Nikolai Zykov.

After the show, Zykov created his own theatre in his house and presented puppet performances before his parents and his younger sister. At that time he did not make puppets by himself. Instead, he took details of toys and inter-connected them with wire.

=== Educational background ===
- 1972–1982: Primary and Secondary School (compulsory general education)
- 1972–1973: Moscow Boys Choir (fortepiano, choir, solfeggio)
- 1973–1979: Moscow Music School (fortepiano, vocal, solfeggio, music literature, music composition)
- 1977–1983: Arcady Kovtun Puppet Studio (drawing, puppet construction, puppet making, puppet performing)
- 1980–1982: Tatiana Kakovkina Drama Studio (acting, poetry declamation, stage moving)
- 1982–1988: National Research University (construction and design of electro-mechanic systems) Received his Master of Science degree.

== Professional background ==
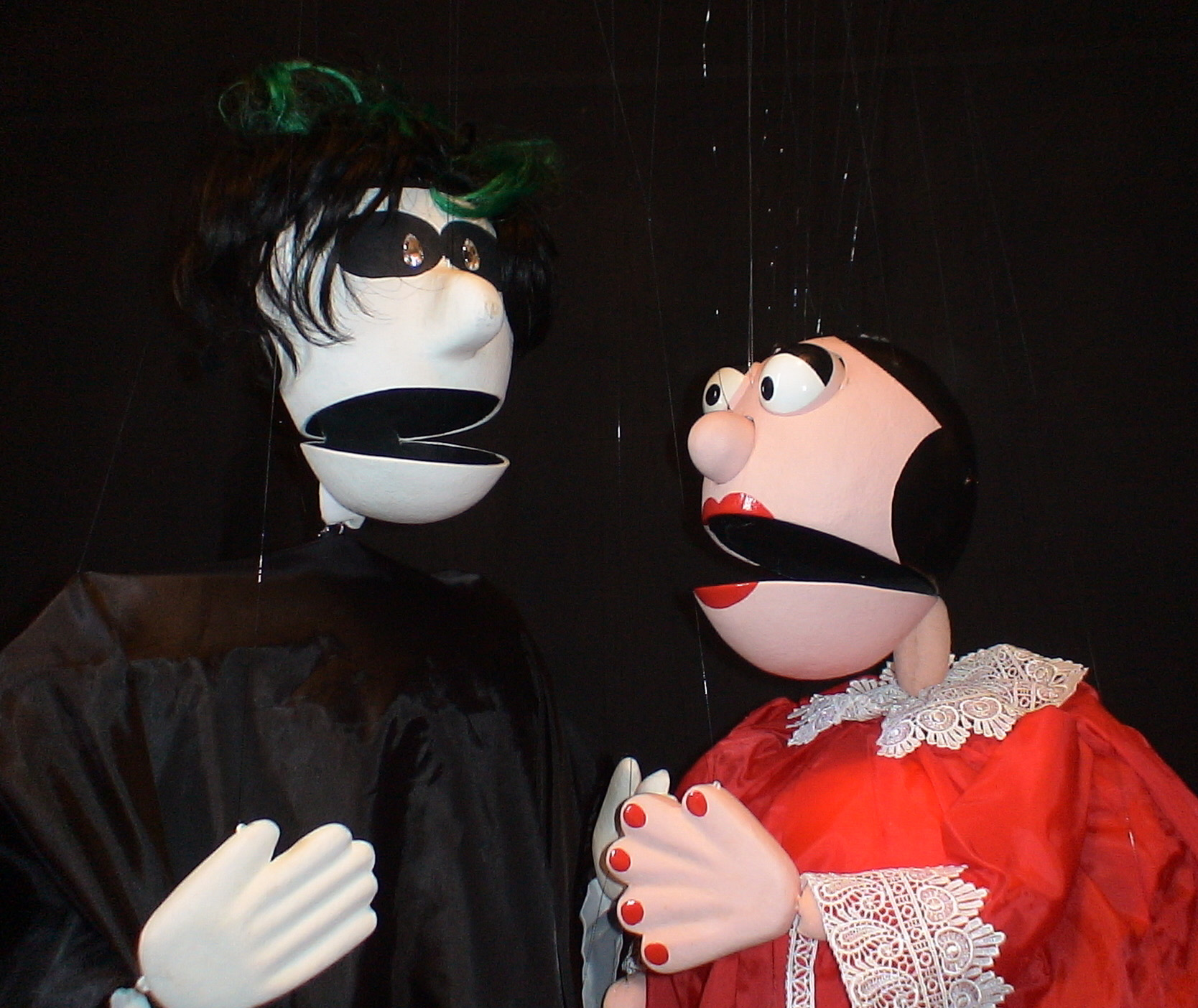
Phantom of the opera (2002), marionettes-transformers, Nikolai Zykov Theatre

=== Puppets ===
Zykov began making puppets for his performances in 1977. In 1980, he made his first puppet vignette. In 1985, he created his first solo puppet performance and founded his own professional Nikolai Zykov Theatre.

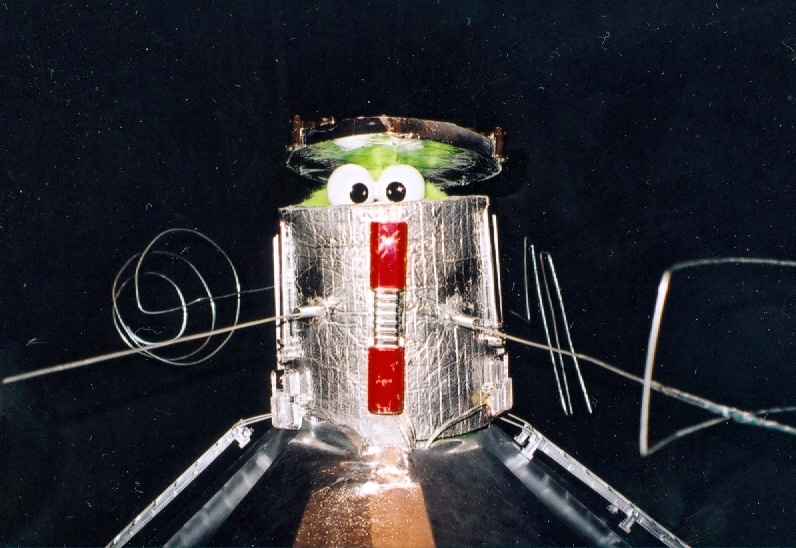
Alien (2003), radio-controlled puppet, Nikolai Zykov Theatre

Zykov has created over 100 puppet vignettes, which include marionettes, hand, rod, giant, radio-controlled and experimental puppets of unusual construction.

Zykov constantly developed the technology and has created many new construction and technological innovations. Some of the more innovative designs include:

1. new not-wood constructions of marionettes (new constructions reduced the weight of marionette in several times and opens new possibilities for this type of puppets) - puppet "Italian Singer"(1983) and others,
2. new original constructions of transformation of marionettes - vignette "Second birth"(1989) and others,
3. new fiberglass controls of marionettes (fiberglass control is extra light and it is practically "invisible" for spectators) - vignette "Funny Company"(1994) and others,
4. new original radio-controlled puppets - vignette "Spider"(2000) and others,
5. new original constructions for flying puppets above the spectators - vignette "Microcosmos"(2002) and others.

=== Performances ===
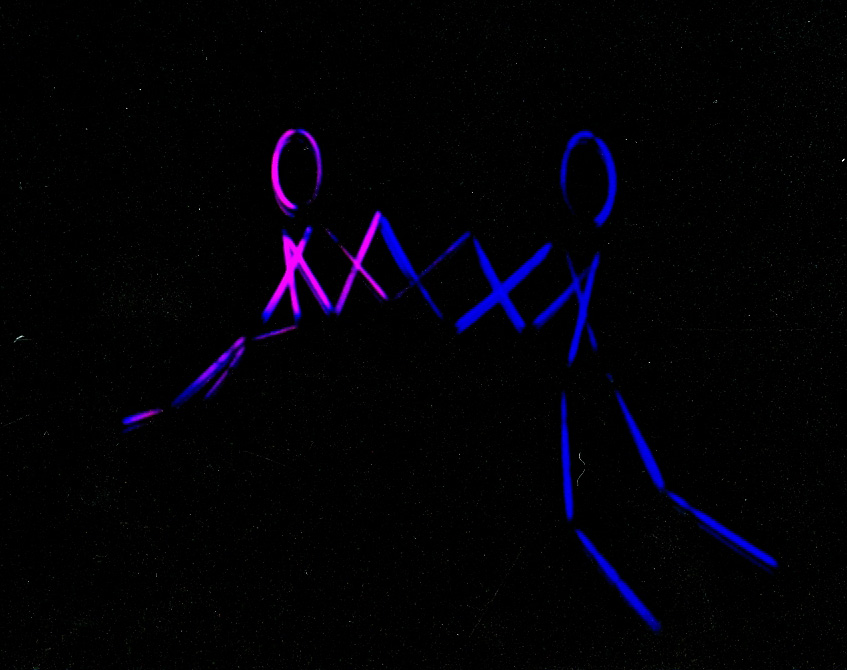
Histoire d'amour (2003), flying marionettes, Nikolai Zykov Theatre

Zykov is an author of over 20 puppet performances. These performances include:

- "Nikolai Zykov presents his puppets" (1985)
- "Only for Adults" (1986)
- "From Prehistoric Man to Aliens" (1989)
- "The Magic World of Marionettes" (1993)
- "The Touch to the Miracle" (1994)
- "Paradise Bird" (1996)
- "Dinosaur and his company" (1998)
- "Cabaret of Metamorphoses" (2000)
- "Giant and others" (2003)
- "Puppet Benefice" (2003)
- "Exclusive Marionettes" (2006)
- "Workshop of Miracles" (2007)
- "Russian Puppets" (2010)
- "Radio-controlled Puppet Show" (2011)
- "Light Puppet Show" (2012)
- "New Animation" (2012)
- "Treasures of the East" (2013)
- "Puppet Bach Concert" (2014)

Zykov has been a member of Russian Authors Organization since 1997.

=== Television ===
Puppets of Zykov took part in many popular television shows in USSR, Russia and abroad.

In 1994-1995, Zykov hosted the children's television show, "Everyday is holiday" on Russian State Television.

=== Tours ===
Zykov has performed in more than 40 countries around the world. These include:

- Argentina
- Brazil
- Venezuela
- Mexico
- United States
- Iceland
- Estonia
- Latvia
- Byelorussia
- Ukraine
- Poland
- Germany
- Belgium
- France
- Spain
- Italy
- Austria
- Czech Republic
- Slovakia
- Hungary
- Russia
- Bulgaria
- Greece
- Cyprus
- Turkey
- Israel
- Egypt
- South Africa
- Mauritius
- Seychelles
- Iran
- Kazakhstan
- Uzbekistan
- Tajikistan
- Afghanistan
- Pakistan
- India
- Sri Lanka
- Singapore
- Taiwan
- China
- South Korea
- Japan

== Awards ==
- Diplomas of several competitions and festivals in Russia
- Gold Medal of the International Festival Arbeiterfestspiele in DDR, 1984
- Medal "For Labour Valour" of Supreme Soviet of the Soviet Union (Parliament of the USSR) for outstanding contribution in culture, 1986
- "Arts Innovation" award of the 12th China Shanghai International Arts Festival and the 2nd Shanghai International Puppet Festival Golden Magnolia, 2010
- "Excellent Show" award of World UNIMA Congress and Festival (2012)
- "Performance" award of Asia-Pacific UNIMA commission (2014)

== See also ==
- Puppetry
- Puppeteer
- Adult puppeteering
- Nikolai Zykov Theatre
