= Thalia Hall =

Thalia Hall may refer to:

- Thalia Hall (Chicago), historic building in Pilsen, Chicago, Illinois, United States of America
- Thalia Hall, Sibiu, theatre and concert hall situated in Sibiu, Romania
- Thalian Hall, historic city hall and theatre located at Wilmington, North Carolina, United States of America

== See also ==
- Thalia Mara Hall, a concert hall and theater in Jackson, Mississippi
- Thalia (disambiguation)
- Thalia Theatre (disambiguation)
