= Thalia (given name) =

Thalia is a feminine given name of ancient Greek origin. It may refer to the following notable people:

- Thalía (Ariadna Thalía Sodi Miranda; born 1971), Mexican singer and actress
- Thalia (born 1996), Indonesian singer and former member of the idol group JKT48
- Thalia Assuras (born 1951), a Canadian television journalist and media consultant
- Thalia C. Eley, Professor of Developmental Behavioural Genetics at the Institute of Psychiatry's MRC Social, Genetic and Developmental Psychiatry Centre, King's College London, UK
- Thalia Charalambous (born 1989), Cypriot long-distance runner
- Thalia Gouma-Peterson (1933–2001), Greek-born art historian
- Thalia Field (born 1966), American writer and editor known for innovative fiction and interdisciplinary collaborations
- Thalia Flora-Karavia (1871–1960), Greek artist and member of the Munich School who was best known for her sketches of soldiers at war
- Thalia Holmes (born 2004), English chess player
- Thalia Iakovidou (born 1972), Greek athlete
- Thalia Mara (1911–2003), American ballet educator and author of books on the subject
- Thalia Massie (1911–1963), member of a socially prominent family who became the genesis of a series of heavily publicized trials in Hawaii
- Thalia Munro (born 1982), American water polo player for the UCLA Bruins and the US National Team, who won the bronze medal at the 2004 Athens Olympics
- Thalia Myers (born 1945), British concert pianist, teacher and animateur
- Thalía Olvino (born 1999), Venezuelan actress, model and beauty pageant titleholder
- Thalia Pellegrini (born 1978), British television presenter
- Thalia Sabanieva (1889–1963), Greek soprano singer
- Thalia Tran, American actress
- Thalia Zedek (born 1961), American singer and guitarist

== See also ==
- Thalia (disambiguation)
- Talia (given name)
