= The Koala =

Satirical college newspaper in California

- "The worst in collegiate journalism since 1982"
- Type: Monthly/quarterly college newspaper
- Format: Tabloid
- School: San Diego State University; University of California San Diego (defunct)
- Founded: 1982
- Headquarters: SDSU, San Diego, CA, U.S.
- Circulation: 8000 (SDSU)

The Koala is a satirical comedy college newspaper that is distributed on the campus of San Diego State University (SDSU) and formerly on the campus of the University of California, San Diego (UCSD). The newspaper's staff occasionally refer to the organization as "The Motherfucking Koala" in its publications and informal constitution.

UC San Diego's branch was one of several campus newspapers partly or entirely funded by the Associated Students, until a decision by the organization to defund all 13 student media outlets. The UCSD branch stopped publishing new content on April 2018 and its website went offline in February 2024.

Until 2007, SDSU's branch operated within SDSU Associated Students as a recognized student organization (RSO) but its status was revoked and has since operated as an independently funded newspaper. Cal State San Marcos hosted a branch until it ceased publishing due to legal action involving its staff.

== History ==
=== UCSD ===
The Koala began life as a publication dedicated to publishes the scores of sports events on the campus of UCSD in 1982. The name of the paper is a reference to the eucalyptus trees that grow on the campus, the leaves of which are the sole source of food in a koala's diet. In 1985 the paper attended sanctioned student organization status.

==== Attempted dissolution by UCSD in 2002 ====
On November 19, 2001, two UCSD Koala staff members attended an open meeting of MEChA. A student photographer, who was not a member of The Koala, later submitted his photographs from the meeting to the paper, which used them in a criticism and parody of MEChA's president, Ernesto Martinez. In February 2002, three months after the meeting, the University accused the two Koala students who attended the MEChA meeting and The Koala itself of violating the Student Code's prohibition of "obstruction or disruption of teaching, research, administration, disciplinary procedures, or other UCSD or University activities." In March 2002, Vice Chancellor Joseph W. Watson wrote to "all academics... staff... and students at UCSD": "We condemn The Koala's abuse of the Constitutional guarantees of free expression and disfavor their unconscionable behavior." The University announced that a trial would be held to determine if the paper would be dissolved.

On May 22, 2002, the UCSD Judicial Board opened the trial to the campus media. The UCSD administration refused to participate and left the hearing. Two days later, Director of Student Policy and Judicial Affairs Nicholas S. Aguilar nullified the hearing and ordered a retrial behind closed doors. At the secret trial held on June 5, 2002, the charges were dismissed.

==== Criticism of university ====
The university administration was subject to sharp criticism for its handling of the case.

The Foundation for Individual Rights in Education (FIRE) released documents and emails indicating that the University encouraged official complaints from MEChA President Ernesto Martinez, and instructed him on how to proceed legally and informally against The Koala. Director of Student Policy and Judicial Affairs Nicholas S. Aguilar denounced the "hate, bigotry, and intolerance" of The Koala. Aguilar encouraged Martinez to submit to his office "any complaints of alleged misconduct not based on the content of the publication." He further assured Martinez of his and the UCSD's administration's support of "the UCSD Principles of Community," which, in his view, Martinez was defending against The Koala. Despite his statements in support of MEChA, Aguilar did not recuse himself from the case. In response to a letter from FIRE, Aguilar claimed that UCSD's actions against The Koala was not based on the content of the publication. Some of these documents were later published by The Koala.

FIRE also pointed out that in 1995, another UCSD student publication, Voz Fronteriza, published an editorial which celebrated the death of Luis A. Santiago, a Latino Immigration and Naturalization Service (INS) officer who died in the line of duty. The article described Santiago as ""traitor...to his race," and stated that "We're glad this pig died, he deserved to die," and argued, "All the Migra pigs should be killed, every single one...the only good one is a dead one...The time to fight back is now. It is time to organize an anti-Migra patrol...It is to [sic] bad that more Migra pigs didn't die with him." In response to outrage generated by this article, Vice Chancellor Joseph W. Watson, whose office oversaw the trial of The Koala, defended Voz Fronteriza's "right to publish their views without adverse administrative action" because "student newspapers are protected by the first amendment of the U.S. constitution." The UCSD administration also issued a formal statement that the University was "legally prohibited from censoring the content of student publications."

Thor L. Halvorssen, executive director of FIRE, cited Vice Chancellor Watson's and USCD's 1995 defense of Voz Fronteriza, and argued that "UCSD hypocritically and selectively violates both its own obligations to that Constitution and its own unconstitutional restrictions of speech on behalf of 'courtesy' and 'sensitivity.'" Alan Charles Kors, president of FIRE, argued that "This is an unmistakable attempt to censor officially disfavored views. The same university that in 1995 declared MEChA's call for the murder of U.S. immigration officers to be 'protected by the first amendment of the U.S. constitution' now prosecutes a student publication's parody of MEChA as 'disruptive.'"

==== Other controversies ====
Other scandals which have garnered national media attention are:

- In November 2015 AS UCSD voted to defund all 13 student media outlets. It is suspected that this was deliberately targeting The Koala. In 2017 a court dismissed a sue by SD ACLU and The Koala. In 2019 the 9th Circuit Court of Appeals reinstated the suit.
- In 2010, The Koala was involved in a racially charged television segment on UCSD's closed-circuit Student Run Television (SRTV) channel. The footage broadcast by the Koala organization was in violation of SRTV's charter (since Koala did not attain the appropriate approvals required for all broadcasts) and included racial slurs and support for the actions of students involved in the recent party billed the "Compton Cookout". When school administration and officials later sought to collect a copy of the tapes at Koala headquarters, a note was found that read "Compton Lynching". Although both the Chancellor and the AS President of UCSD condemned The Koala's actions, their future funding has been reinstated.
- In 2006, The Koala was evicted from its campus offices by Gary Radcliffe, assistant vice chancellor of student life, when a bong with marijuana residue and beer bottles were discovered in its filing cabinets. This resulted in a sit-in where staffers occupied and lived in the office and adjacent media commons.
- In 2005, Editor Steve York broadcast a pornographic video of him having sex with a woman on Koala-TV. York's story appeared on several local and national TV news programs. York also appeared on The O'Reilly Factor to discuss the issue.
- In 2003, The Koala published a parody newspaper called Jizzlam, a parody of Playboy Magazine for Muslims; which critics charged was offensive against the Muslim community. The 16-page edition included illustrated articles like "The Jizzlam guide to sexual positions during prayer" and "The Miss World Jizzlam burkini contest."

=== SDSU ===
In 2005, George Lee Liddle 3rd, the former editor of UCSD's Koala registered the paper as a for-profit business and obtained office space and student organization status at San Diego State University, according to The New York Times. In May 2007 the administration reported that a staff member urinated in one of the elevators which gave university police probable cause to enter and search The Koala's student union office. There they found alcohol which violated university policy and the RSO status was revoked.

In May 2008 a statement from an anonymous reader appeared in the 'Personals' section of the newspaper stating "Frat boys, the DEA is after you”. A day later Operation Sudden Fall culminated in the largest campus drug bust in San Diego County history and one of the largest college drug busts in U.S. history.

In 2008, a group of professors made a complaint to the Center for Student Rights and Responsibilities after one of their own was labelled a "a fat, ugly and childless black woman" in the publication. Officials denied the complaint, citing freedom of speech.

In the fall of 2013 students send a letter to SDSU's Freedom of Expression Committee calling for an end of the publications distribution on campus. The request was denied.

==== Other controversies ====
- In 2012 The Koala issued an apology to SDSU AS as part of one of two demands AS step forth for the organization in February 2010 to be reconsidered for RSO status. “The Koala is really really really, super duper sorry that previous members, none of whom any current staff members know, were reckless with the office space in Aztec Center, a building which no longer exists.”
- In 2010 an article attempting to point out the alleged dismissal of a sexual assault case was met with controversy.
- In 2007 a letter in the 'Personals' section of one issue criticized an openly gay fraternity administrator sparking campus backlash.

=== San Marcos ===
- In October 2011, six current and former CSUSM students alleged to be members of The Koala were accused of "Disorderly, lewd, indecent, or obscene behavior at a University related activity, or directed toward a member of the University community" and "Conduct that threatens or endangers the health or safety of any person within or related to the University community, including physical abuse, threats, intimidation, harassment, or sexual misconduct". Soon after the charges went public, they were withdrawn.

== Differences between branches ==
=== UCSD ===
The Koala at UCSD produced one issue roughly every quarter and never during the summer. They were a sanctioned student organization (SSO) but are unable to use funds from the university as of a decision made in November 2015. The content of the UCSD Koala can be categorized as shock humor. Described as nihilistic, it holds nothing as too taboo or off limits. This branch operated the domain TheKoala.org, where it kept a public archive of its past issues. The UCSD branch was removed as an SSO in September 2017 and ceased publication in April 2018.

=== SDSU ===
The Koala at SDSU produces a monthly issue during the fall and spring semesters, typically being four each. Since losing RSO status, this branch has been fully self-sustained, solely using advertising revenue to cover the printing of each issue. The content of the SDSU Koala is distinct from the UCSD branch and is self-described as absurdist humor centering on student life, hedonistic lifestyles, and party culture. The SDSU Koala since 2019 has published content that is notably more anti-racist and anti-homophobic in nature, and overall has promoted sex/body positivity, substance use, and nihilism. After the October 7 attacks and beginning of the Gaza genocide in 2023, articles from the SDSU branch have pivoted in a direction that is more outwardly politically progressive.
