= RiverCenter for the Performing Arts =

Performing arts center in Columbus, Georgia, U.S.

Coordinates: 32.464132°N 84.992616°W

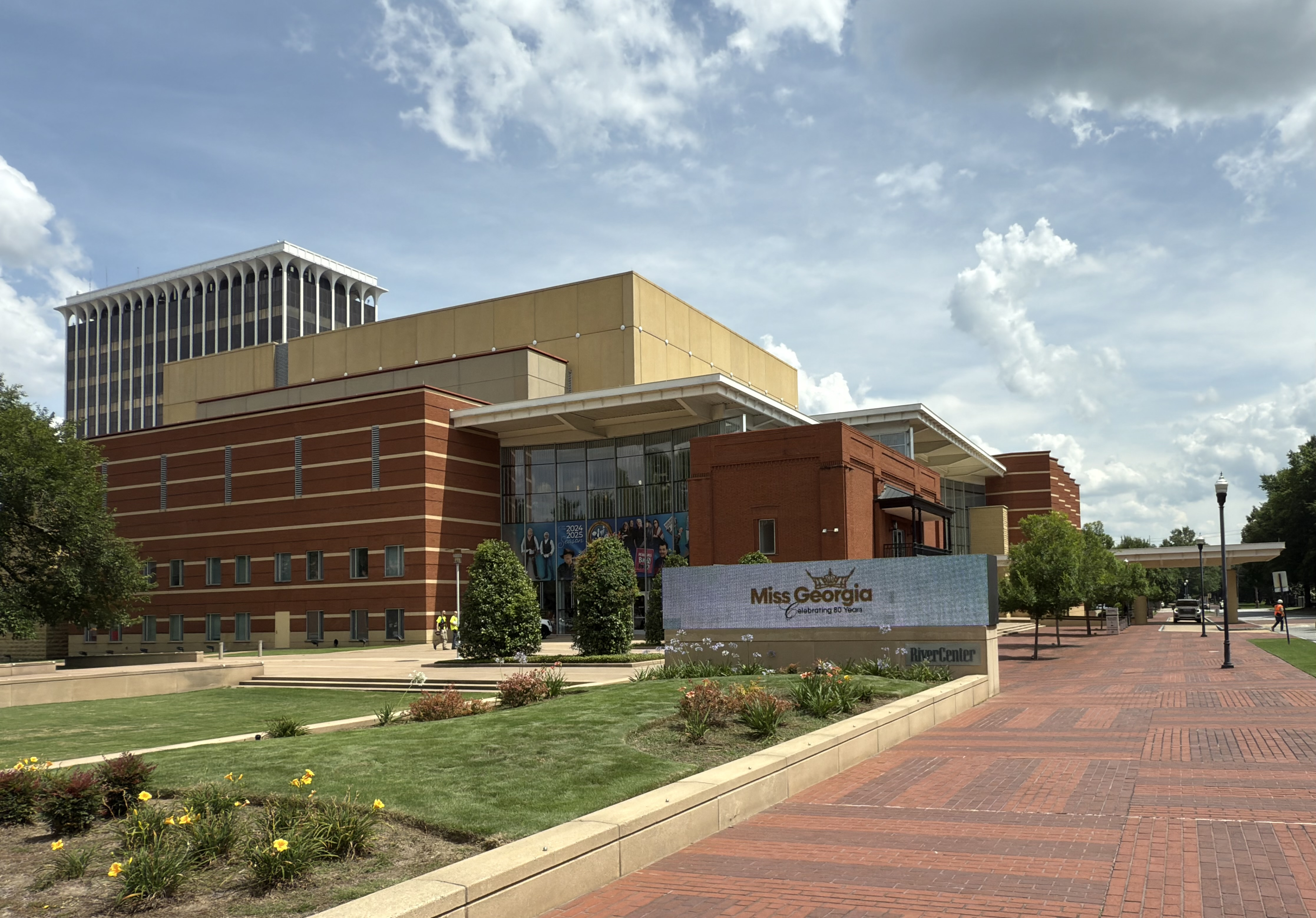
RiverCenter for the Performing Arts

The RiverCenter for the Performing Arts is a modern performance space in Downtown Columbus, Georgia, United States.

== Introduction ==
The center first opened in 2002 with the completion of Studio Theatre, a flexible black-box style experimental theatre that seats a maximum of 250 people. Other halls in the 240,000 ft² (22,300 m²) facility include Legacy Hall, a 450-seat concert hall with flexible acoustics and a magnificent, $1,000,000 Jordan concert organ adorning the center of the second tier. The stage includes room for up to 60 orchestral musicians and 80 choral singers. The largest hall, Bill Heard Theatre, is a 2,000-seat three-level theatre. An orchestra pit and 60-foot (18 m)-wide stage are accented by enormous weaving ribbons of colored metal mesh that sweep across the theatre. Other spaces include an outdoor concert hall and rehearsal rooms in the Schwob School of Music. The Schwob School is a department of Columbus State University.

== Bill Heard Theatre ==
The Bill Heard Theatre is a 2,000-seat theatre with three levels: Orchestra, Mezzanine, and Balcony. The theatre also includes six box-style booths on each level. Seats are accessed by side hallways on either side of the first two levels and from the back on all levels. The hall's namesake comes from primary donor and Columbus native, William Heard.

== Performances ==
RiverCenter has held host to famous musicians, dancers, actors, comedians, and entertainers from around the world. Notable performances include Bill Cosby, Stomp, Miss Saigon, A Streetcar Named Desire, Blast!, Yo-Yo Ma, Itzhak Perlman, The Moscow Boys Choir, David Copperfield, Jessye Norman, Chick Corea and Bela Fleck, and Dame Kiri Te Kanawa. Annually, the center hosts the Miss Georgia Pageant and the Ledger-Enquirer's Page One Awards. The Bill Heard Theatre regularly holds performances of the Columbus Symphony, the Youth Orchestra of Greater Columbus, and the Columbus Ballet. RiverCenter operates under contract with Tickets.com and runs performances year-round. In a June interview with CMT.com, Garrison Keillor called RiverCenter "a fabulous new auditorium that is as fine as any I've ever played in."

== Design and construction ==
RiverCenter's design team included internationally acclaimed Hardy Holzman Phiefer Associates (1981 Architecture Firm Award) and local firm, Hecht Burdeshaw Architects (credited with the Aflac, TSYS, and Synovus World Headquarters). For the theatre design, Theatre Projects Consultants of Norwalk, Connecticut were contracted. Other design team members include Jordan, Jones, and Goulding (Civil Engineers; Columbus); Harrington Engineers, Incorporated (Structural Engineers; Atlanta); Newcomb & Boyd (Mechanical Engineers; Atlanta); Cline, Bettridge, Bernstein Lighting Design (Architectural Lighting; New York); JaffeHolden Acoustics, Inc. (Acoustical Consultant; Norwalk, CT); and Jones Worley Graphics, Incorporated (RiverCenter logo and "performers"; Atlanta). General Contractor of the building was handled by Beers Skanska, Incorporated or Atlanta. Pre-acquisition environmental and construction testing of the site was performed by employees of Building and Earth Sciences in Columbus. Most of the subcontracting work including stone, masonry, steel, fire protection, and staging were made locally.

== Technology ==
The RiverCenter is one of the most technologically advanced performance spaces in the state. In Heard Hall, the lighting booth boasts an Ion Lighting console, manufactured by world-renowned Electronic Theatre Controls (ETC). Racks of Sensor+ Dimmers can handle loads in excess of one million watts (1000 kW). In Legacy Hall and the Studio Theatre, lighting is controlled on ETC Expression consoles. Almost all lighting instruments are provided by ETC.

Sound is mixed on a now discontinued Crest Audio V12 32 channel analog mixing console and heard on Eastern Acoustic Works Speakers. External processing (outboard- equalization, compressing, limiting) in the Heard Hall is done on Klark Teknik units. All halls boast the ability to record audio and video.

The rear walls of the auditorium are fitted with motorized acoustic curtains that can be adjusted to better suit the type of performance. To further improve acoustics, a large three piece orchestra shell ceiling extends from the stage proscenium. The entire mahogany structure can be adjusted with motorized counter-weight rigging.

An orchestra pit seating up to fifty musicians can be raised to house or stage position, adding four rows of seating, or an extended apron.

== Trivia ==
• The movie "The Fighting Temptations" features RiverCenter's Bill Heard Theatre as the site of the gospel competition near the end of the film.
