= Conaco =

American production company

Conaco, LLC
- Logo used from 2010 to 2021
- Type: Private
- Industry: Media
- Founded: 2001; 25 years ago
- Founder: Conan O'Brien
- Headquarters: Burbank, California, U.S.
- Key people: Conan O'Brien; David Kissinger (president); Jeff Ross
- Products: Late Night with Conan O'Brien; The Tonight Show with Conan O'Brien; Conan
- Services: Television production
- Number of employees: About 185 (until 2013)

Conaco, LLC is an American television production company founded in 2001 and owned by entertainer Conan O'Brien. The name is a portmanteau of the words "Conan" and "Co", an abbreviation of company. The name is also a parody of the petroleum oil company Conoco. It has produced programs primarily for NBCUniversal and Warner Bros. Discovery, including O'Brien's Late Night, Tonight Show, and Conan. David Kissinger, former NBCU executive and the son of Henry Kissinger, has been president since 2005.

Conaco's first production credit was the short-lived 2001 reality show Lost. The firm also produced the Andy Richter series Andy Barker, P.I. for six episodes as well as the drama Outlaw, about a former Supreme Court justice (Jimmy Smits) who starts a law firm, which was canceled after a few episodes.

O'Brien's departure agreement with NBC following the 2010 Tonight Show conflict allowed Conaco to continue operation until the end of the production season. After that, Conaco switched affiliations to Warner Bros. Television, owned by Time Warner along with O'Brien's new network beginning in November 2010, TBS. Conaco produced O'Brien's late night talk show on TBS. Conaco also produced Eagleheart, a show starring Chris Elliott for TBS' sister network, Adult Swim.

== Filmography ==
=== Television ===
Year	Title	Network	Notes
2001–2009	Late Night with Conan O'Brien	NBC	with Broadway Video and Universal Media Studios
2001	Lost	NBC	with NBC Studios
2007	Andy Barker, P.I.	NBC	with Red Pulley Productions and NBC Universal Television Studio
2009–2010	The Tonight Show with Conan O'Brien	NBC	with Universal Media Studios
2010	Outlaw	NBC	with Thanksgiving Day Productions and Universal Media Studios
2010–2021	Conan	TBS	with Warner Bros. Television
2011–2014	Eagleheart	Adult Swim	with Dakota Pictures and Williams Street
2013	Deon Cole's Black Box	TBS	with Warner Horizon Television
2013–2014	Super Fun Night	ABC	with Bonanza Productions, Warner Bros. Television and ABC Studios (episodes 10–17)
2013–2014	The Pete Holmes Show	TBS	
2016–2017	People of Earth	TBS	with Deedle-Dee Productions and Warner Horizon Television
2018	Don't Hug Me I'm Scared		with Blink Industries and Super Deluxe; pilot only
2018–2021	Final Space	TBS; Adult Swim	with ShadowMachine, Jam Filled Entertainment, Star Cadet, New Form Digital and Studio T (s. 1)
2024–present	Conan O'Brien Must Go	HBO Max; HBO	
2025	The Beast in Me	Netflix	with Teakwood Lane Productions, Overall Production and 20th Television

=== Upcoming productions ===
- Untitled Max stand-up specials
