= Don't Hug Me I'm Scared =

British web series

- Promotional poster
- Also known as: DHMIS
- Genre: Adult puppeteering; Comedy horror; Musical; Surreal humour; Psychological horror
- Created by: Becky Sloan; Joseph Pelling; Baker Terry
- Written by: Becky Sloan; Joseph Pelling; Hugo Donkin; Baker Terry
- Directed by: Becky Sloan; Joseph Pelling
- Voices of: Baker Terry; Joseph Pelling; Becky Sloan
- Composers: Joseph Pelling; Charlie Pelling
- Country of origin: United Kingdom
- Original language: English
- No. of series: 1
- No. of episodes: 6

Production
- Executive producers: Becky Sloan; Joseph Pelling; James Stevenson Bretton; Thomas Ridgewell
- Producers: Benjamin Lole; Hugo Donkin
- Cinematography: Max Halstead; Edward Tucker
- Running time: 3–8 minutes
- Production companies: THIS IS IT; Blink Industries

Original release
- Network: YouTube
- Release: 29 July 2011 – 19 June 2016

Related
- Don't Hug Me I'm Scared (TV series)

Don't Hug Me I'm Scared (often abbreviated as DHMIS) is a British adult puppet comedy horror web series created by Becky Sloan and Joe Pelling that consists of six short episodes released on YouTube between 29 July 2011 and 19 June 2016. It is notable for blending surrealism and dark comedy with psychological horror and musical elements. Its production is diverse, combining puppetry and live action with styles of animation including stop motion, traditional animation, flash animation, claymation, and computer animation.

Each episode of the series starts like a typical children's programme, consisting of anthropomorphic puppets akin to those featured in Sesame Street or The Muppets. The series parodies and satirises these programmes by juxtaposing its inhabitants and their childlike, colourful environment against disturbing themes; each episode develops a plot twist that incorporates psychological horror, surreal imagery, dark comedy, extreme graphic violence, and existentialism, before returning the traumatised characters to their original situation with an altered outlook as a result of their experience. The series has received widespread critical acclaim for its production design, humour, hidden themes, lore, and characters.

A sequel television series, also consisting of six episodes, was released on All 4 on 23 September 2022. In February 2026, it was announced by comedy subscription streaming service Dropout that both the web series and TV series versions of DHMIS would be non-exclusively licensed to them for three years, in the first-ever licensing deal for Dropout.

== Premise ==
Each episode revolves around three characters: a yellow childlike humanoid with blue hair and overalls, an anthropomorphic green mallard duck with a tweed jacket, and a red humanoid with a mop-like head. Their names are never explicitly stated, but they are often referred to as Yellow Guy, Duck, and Red Guy. Characters never relate to each other by name, but by pronouns or different aliases. Yellow Guy's father, Roy, occasionally appears but does not speak. An episode typically follows the three main characters meeting one or several anthropomorphic characters, who begin a musical number related to a basic concept of day-to-day life with an upbeat melody, similar to a Sesame Street segment. As each song progresses, it becomes apparent that its moral or message is nonsensical and self-contradicting, and that the "teacher" character has sinister ulterior motives. The climax of each episode is typically a plot twist involving psychological horror, dark comedy, and extreme graphic violence. Later in the series, the characters begin questioning the nature of their reality and the bizarre messages of the teachers.

== Cast ==
- Baker Terry as Yellow Guy, Duck, Tony the Talking Clock, Shrignold, Steak, and Lamp
- Becky Sloan as Sketchbook and Spinach Can
- Joseph Pelling as Red Guy and Colin the Computer

=== Cameos ===
- TomSka as Magnet
- Kellen Goff as Shovel

== Production ==
Becky Sloan, Joseph Pelling, and Baker Terry met while studying Fine Art and Animation at Kingston University, where they started the THIS IS IT Collective with some friends. They produced the first episode of Don't Hug Me I'm Scared (Note: The official YouTube channel for the series is called "Don't Hug Me .I'm [sic] Scared".) in their free time with no budget. When they started on the project they imagined making it into a series, but initially did not plan the idea after finishing the first episode. After the short film gained popularity, they decided to revisit that idea. Channel 4's late-night short film strand Random Acts commissioned the second episode. The show attracted mainstream commissioners; however, Sloan and Pelling declined these offers because they "wanted to keep it fairly odd" and "have the freedom to do exactly what we wanted".

In May 2014, Sloan and Pelling announced that they would start a Kickstarter fundraising campaign to make four or more additional episodes, one every three months, starting in September 2014. They uploaded low-quality camera footage of the characters being taken hostage and held for ransom. A 12-year-old American boy tried to use stolen credit card information to donate £35,000 to the campaign, but he was caught and those funds were removed. Their Kickstarter goal of £96,000 was reached on 19 June 2014, and in total £104,935 was raised. YouTuber TomSka became an executive producer on the series after donating £5,000 to the Kickstarter.

In January 2016, Sloan and Pelling collaborated with Lazy Oaf to release a line of clothing based on the characters and themes of the show.

== Episodes ==
All episodes were written and directed by Becky Sloan and Joe Pelling. Baker Terry began co-writing each episode starting with "Time", which itself was also co-written by Hugo Donkin.

No.	Title	Original release date
1	"Creativity (Note: This episode was uploaded under the title Don't Hug me I'm Scared.)"	29 July 2011
Yellow Guy, Duck, and Red Guy are sitting at their kitchen table when a sketchbook suddenly opens and begins singing about being creative. The three characters then undertake childlike activities as the sketchbook sings, such as imagining clouds as different shapes and sorting leaves by colour. Many of Yellow Guy's ideas are described as non-creative by the sketchbook. The episode culminates in an exaggerated depiction of what "creativity" can be, with the main characters doing deranged acts such as baking a cake with internal organs or covering human hearts in glitter, with shaky camera shots and frantic music. The video ends with everyone sitting at the table and their surroundings restored to normal. The sketchbook then sings that they should "never be creative again" before closing.
2	"Time (Note: This episode is the only one to be uploaded with a proper episode title, as all subsequent episodes are titled Don't Hug Me I'm Scared followed by their corresponding episode number.)"	8 January 2014
Yellow Guy, Duck, and Red Guy are sitting in the living room, watching a television that plays only static as they wait for a television show they enjoy to begin. A singing clock named Tony comes alive to teach them about the passage and nature of time. During his song, the characters constantly question time and its reality, annoying Tony. He accelerates time itself during the climax of the song, causing the characters to age rapidly and decompose, which is then revealed to be part of the television show they were watching. Back in the living room, Tony ominously tells them that "eventually everyone runs out of time" before the television returns to playing static. Red Guy turns the television off.
3	"Love"	31 October 2014
Yellow Guy, Duck, and Red Guy are at a "chicken picnic", where Duck kills a yellow butterfly. Yellow Guy is upset and runs away into a tree, where he meets a butterfly named Shrignold, who sings to him about love and says that true love is kept for one's "special one". After an unrelated story about "Michael, the loneliest boy in town", Shrignold reveals himself to be a member of a cult that worships a statue named Malcolm, to which they feed gravel. As the cult tries to coerce Yellow Guy into abandoning his identity to find solace, he wakes up from his dream in a tree. Duck and Red Guy find him, offering him their last boiled egg as an apology. A disgusting caterpillar-like creature hatches from the egg and calls Yellow Guy "father" before Duck kills it.
4	"Computers"	1 April 2015
Yellow Guy, Duck, and Red Guy are playing a trivia board game when Red Guy reads the question "what is the biggest thing in the world?", to which they have no answer. A globe named Gilbert comes to life, presumably to tell them about the question, but a singing computer named Colin interrupts, presenting himself as clever and helpful due to being digital. He asks the group many questions in the style of a computer setup, as the increasingly annoyed Red Guy slams his hand on Colin's keyboard. Colin instantly flies into a rage and glitches the screen before transporting the characters to the "Digital World". He shows them the three main activities they can do: looking at various charts, "Digital Style", and "Digital Dancing". These three activities are repeated rapidly until a room is filled with corrupted and distorted dancing clones of Yellow Guy, Duck, and Colin. Red Guy attempts to escape the room, exiting to another room containing a human film crew in spandex suits filming a crude replica of the main cast. Red Guy reacts with confusion but is interrupted when his head explodes into glitter at the sound of a clapperboard.
5	"Food"	14 October 2015
Red Guy is absent; Yellow Guy and Duck seem to be aware of a change in their usual circumstances, but cannot clarify what it is. Anthropomorphic pieces of food start to sing about being healthy, but deliver bizarre and nonsensical advice to only eat plain-looking foods because other foods "makes your teeth go grey". The song is repeatedly interrupted by the telephone ringing. After Duck answers it, he becomes fearful and attempts to escape. He awakens in a dark room, where an anthropomorphic can of food disembowels him and eats his organs, as the anthropomorphic food continues singing to Yellow Guy back in the kitchen. The scene suddenly cuts to night, where Yellow Guy is shown fat and his mouth is covered with blood and Duck's feathers as the phone rings once more. During the closing credits, Red Guy walks away from a telephone box.
6	"Dreams"	19 June 2016
Yellow Guy is crying in bed, lamenting his missing friends. A talking lamp comes to sing about dreams and drags him into an animated sequence, ignoring his pleas to stop. Yellow Guy wakes up drowning in oil. The episode abruptly cuts to Red Guy in an office, with other workers who resemble him. He fantasises about a file coming alive and singing a song, which leaves his colleagues unimpressed. At a bar, he performs the "Creative" song from the first episode on stage, but is booed by the audience. Seeing Yellow Guy's father Roy in the back of the audience, Red Guy is suddenly transported to a dark and empty room, where he finds a control panel with monitors recording Yellow Guy being mentally tortured by the singing lamp. Using the panel, he frantically transforms the lamp into several of the "teacher" characters from previous episodes, as well as teachers that have not yet been seen. After Roy touches Red Guy on the shoulder from behind with a massively elongated arm, Red Guy notices and follows a cord from the machine to a giant plug and pulls it out. The episode then cuts to Red Guy, Yellow Guy, and Duck sitting at a table in a kitchen, with the colour of their "skin" changed to the colour each one named as their favourite in the first episode. The sketchbook from the first episode reappears, opens, and sings the opening line to the "Creative" song.

== Reception ==
The series received widespread critical acclaim. Scott Beggs listed the original short film as number 8 on his list of the 11 best short films of 2011. Carolina Mardones listed the first episode as number 7 in her top ten short films of 2011. It was included as part of a cinema event in Banksy's Dismaland. In April 2016, the main characters of the series were featured on the cover of the magazine Printed Pages, along with an "interview" of the three main characters written by the magazine's editor. All six episodes were included in the September 2016 festival XOXO.

Drew Grant of The Observer described the series as "mind-melting". Freelance writer Benjamin Hiorns observed that "it's not the subject matter that makes these films so strangely alluring, it's the strikingly imaginative set and character design and the underlying Britishness of it all". Joe Blevins of The A.V. Club praised the show's "sense-to-nonsense ratio" and its production values. Samantha Joy of TenEighty praised the sixth episode of the series, writing that it "creates a provocative end to a pretty dark narrative about content creation".

== Television series ==
On 19 June 2017, a year after the release of episode 6, Sloan hinted towards additional work into the Don't Hug Me I'm Scared series. A teaser trailer titled "Wakey Wakey..." was released on the channel on 13 September 2018, teasing a television show made in a collaboration between Blink Industries, Conaco, and Super Deluxe. The 30-second video gained over two million views within 24 hours of its release and peaked at number 1 on YouTube's Trending list. Details of the plot were released on 3 December 2018 in advance of a 2019 Sundance Film Festival screening of the pilot. The pilot episode ran at 23 minutes, and it appeared in the "Indie Episodic Program 1" alongside other short films.

On 7 July 2020, it was announced that the series had been ordered by Channel 4. The series ended filming by September 2021, and it was expected to be originally released streaming on All 4 on 12 September 2022. However, the series was postponed because of the death of Queen Elizabeth II. On 16 September 2022, it was announced that the series would be released on 23 September 2022 on All 4 and premiered on 30 September 2022 on Channel 4.
