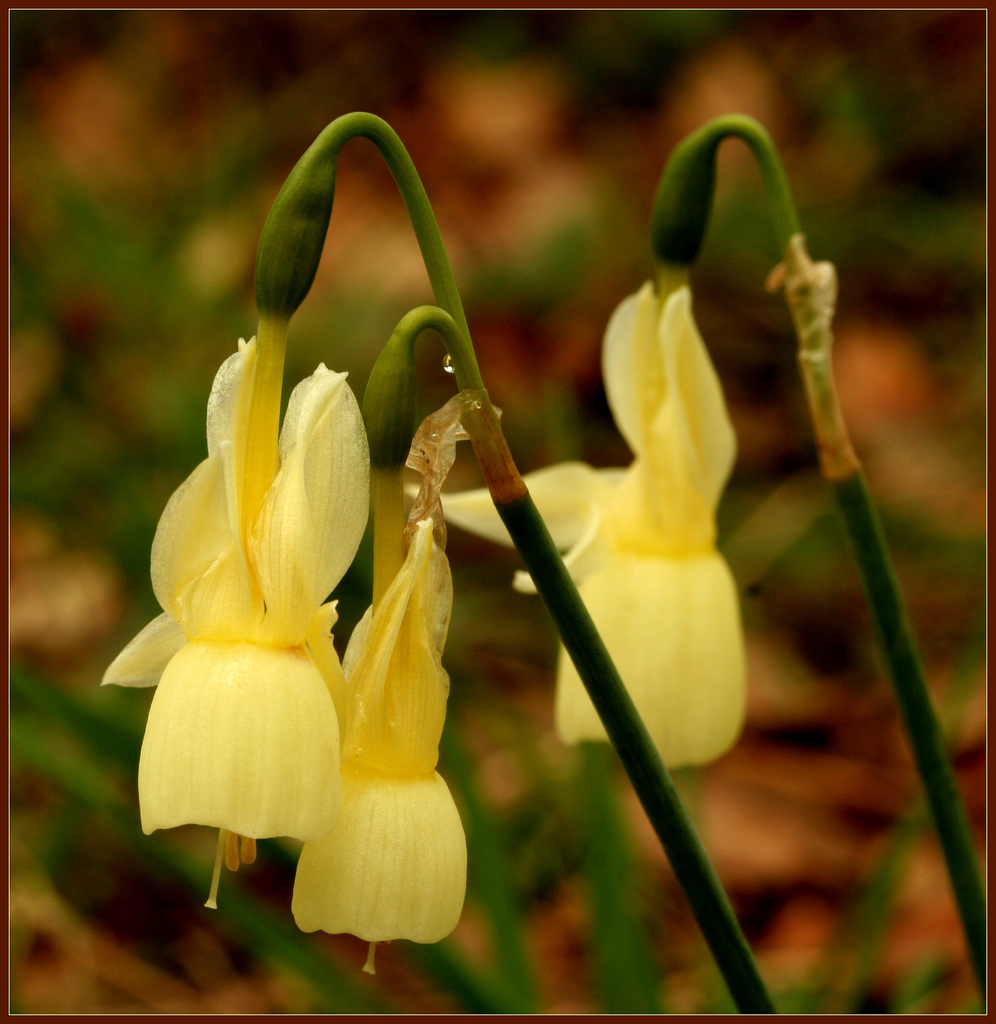

Scientific classification
- Kingdom: Plantae
- Clade: Tracheophytes
- Clade: Angiosperms
- Clade: Monocots
- Order: Asparagales
- Family: Amaryllidaceae
- Subfamily: Amaryllidoideae
- Genus: Narcissus
- Species: N. triandrus

Binomial name
- Narcissus triandrus L.

Synonyms
- Ganymedes triandrus (L.) Haw.; Illus triandrus (L.) Haw.; Queltia triandra (L.) M. Roem.

= Narcissus triandrus =

Angel's tears

Species of daffodil

Narcissus triandrus, also known as the Angel's Tears daffodil, is a species of flowering plant within the family Amaryllidaceae.

The popular cultivar 'Hawera', belonging to the Triandrus group, has received the Royal Horticultural Society's Award of Garden Merit.

== Description ==
Narcissus triandrus is a bulbous perennial plant. The bulbs of this species are small and dark in colour. Bulbs lay dormant in the soil for the majority of the year until emerging in the Spring. A single bulb usually produces two leaves each that can grow to a length of 20 cm (7.9 in) long by 4–5 mm wide. Leaves are keeled, striate on their surface and sometimes coiled at the tip. Stems of the species are 30 cm (12 in) tall, thick, tubular, and almost waxy on their outer side. Stems can hold from one to six cup-shaped flowers, which are milk white or pale yellow in colour.

== Reproduction ==
The flower size varies, increasing from southeast to northwest, correlating with plant size, probably reflecting a rainfall gradient from the hot Mediterranean climate of the southeast to the cooler, wetter Atlantic climate found in the northwest. Changes in flower size correlate with pollinator fauna, Anthophora species being dominant in the southern population and the larger-bodied Bombus species in the north.

Self-pollination was found to result in significantly lower seed production than in cross-pollination within Narcissus triandrus.

== Distribution and habitat ==
Native to France, Spain and Portugal, where it grows in woodlands, scrubland and exposed mountain habitats in acidic soils.

It has been observed to grow in scrublands, mesophilic grasslands, sandy soils, including some more rocky areas. In Europe, the plant has been spotted in the Iberian Peninsula, the Iberian and Aracena Mountains, as well as the Baetic and Penibaetic mountain systems and the Serra de Monchique.

== Cultivation ==
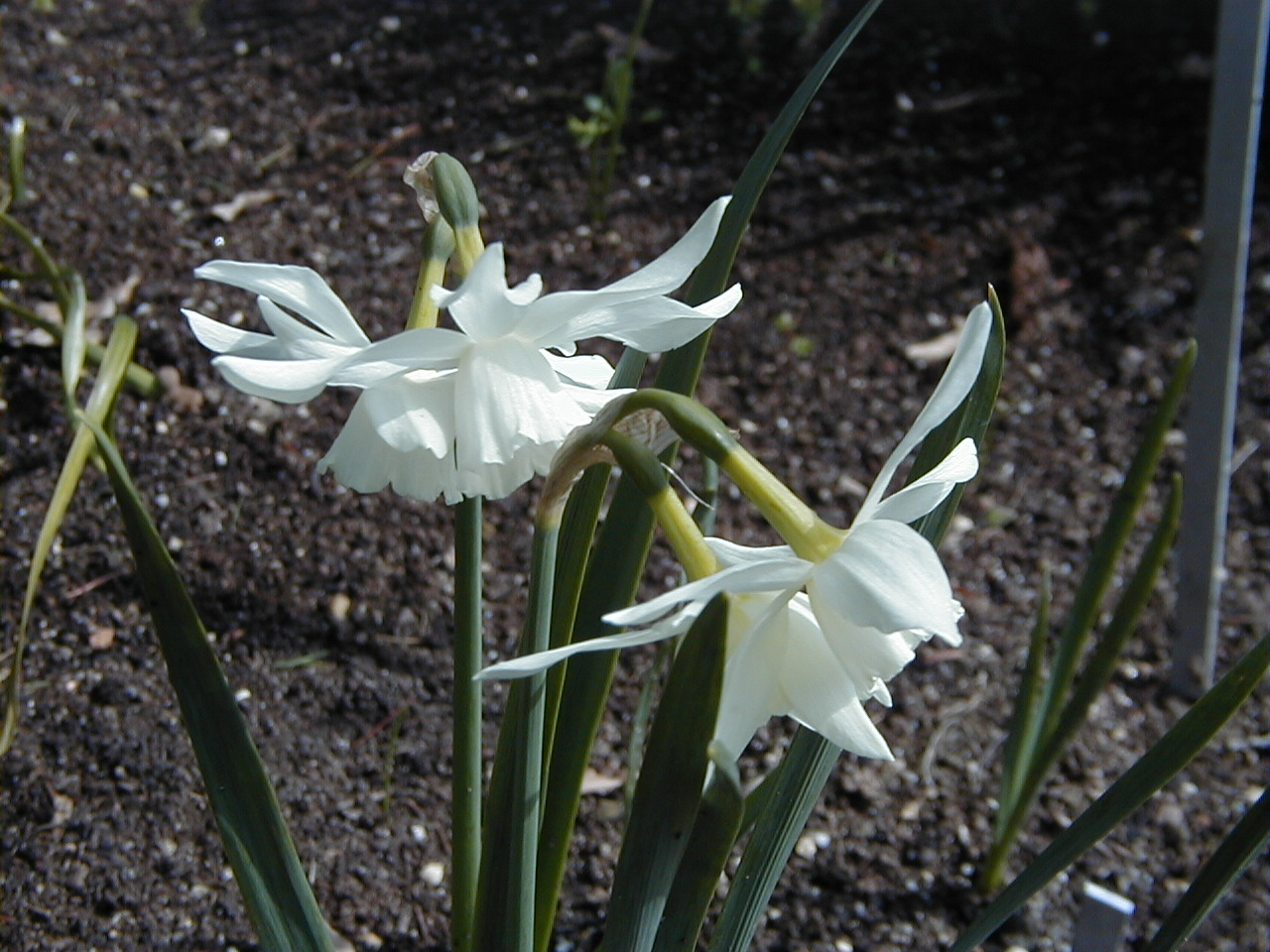
N. triandrus 'Thalia', a variety that bears open, nodding flowers

While not a very popular species of the daffodil, these plants have similar care and blooming needs. They are low maintenance plants that require full sun, or part shade, medium water (meaning that the soil should be watered until damp, then left to dry and once dry, watered lightly again). The species is tolerant of rabbits, deer, and drought. This aversion towards disease and pests is known to be from the plant's high alkaloid and lycorine content.

Flowering in late spring, April through May, it is best that these plants are planted above summer blooming buds, yet below early spring bloomers. It is suggested that these plants be potted or placed in soft, well drained ground in late fall. If planted deep enough (two to three times deeper than the bulbs original length) then it should retain its moisture and last through the winter. And, while these flowers do like shady areas, it is better for them to be placed in full sun or in an area that gets sun throughout most of the day, this is because of the flowers of like to point towards and be in the sun's light as much as possible.

== Subspecies ==
- Narcissus triandrus subsp. triandrus
- Narcissus triandrus subsp. lusitanicus
- Narcissus triandrus subsp. pallidulus

=== Varieties ===
- Narcissus triandrus var. cernuus
- Narcissus triandrus var. con-color
- Naricissus triandrus var. loiseleurii
