= Blink (company) =

British production company

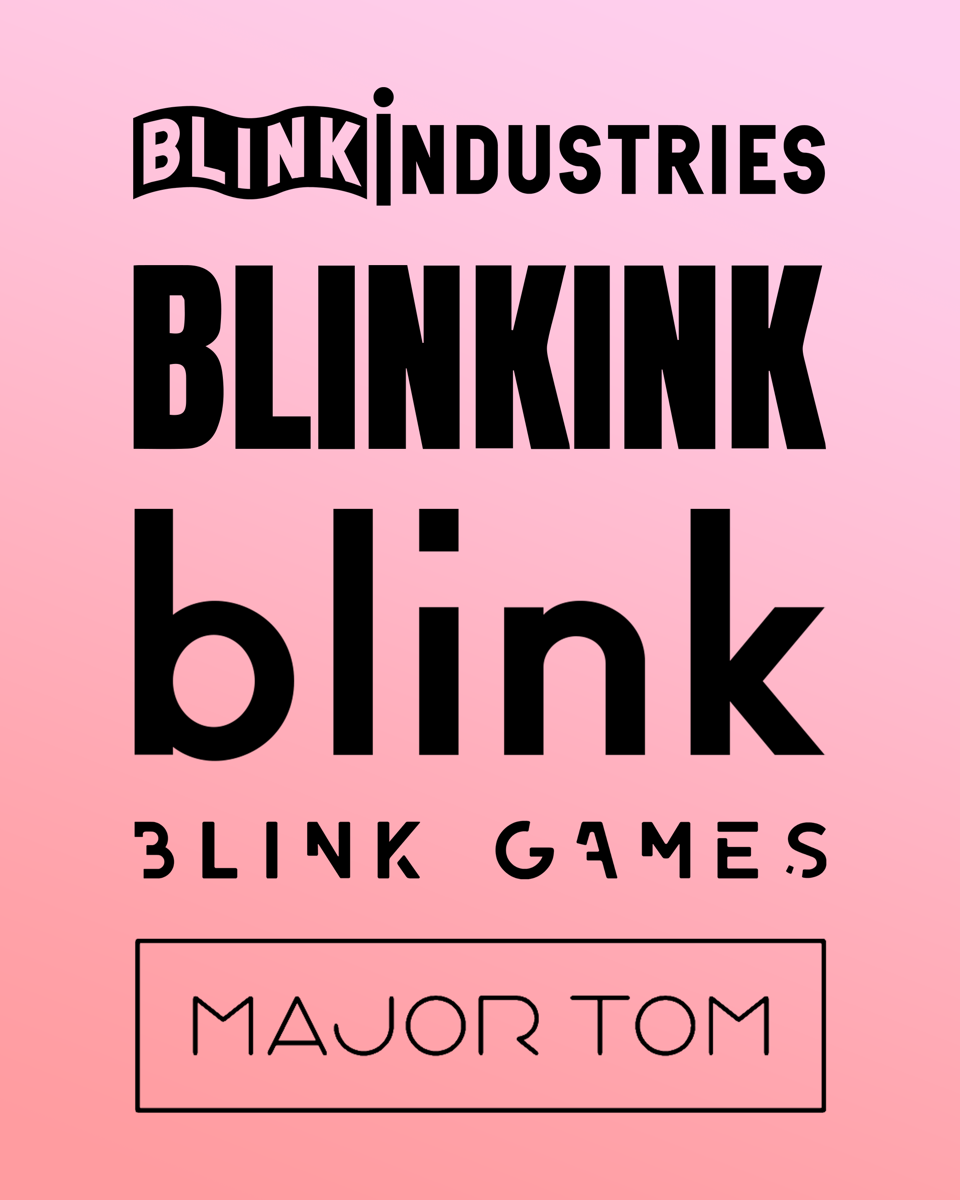
- Industry: Entertainment, Animation, Music Video, Advertising
- Founded: 1985; 41 years ago
- Founder: Bob Lawrie, James Studholme
- Headquarters: London, United Kingdom
- Area served: Global
- Key people: James Studholme; Michelle Jaffe; Bart Yates; James Stevenson Bretton; Paul Weston
- Divisions: Blink Industries; Blinkink; Blink Productions; Blink Games; Major Tom

Blink is a British independent development studio and production company. They make TV series, commercials, music videos, short films, branded content and video games. The company structure comprises Blink Industries (TV & Film), Blinkink (commercials & music videos with a focus on mixed media/animation), Blink Productions (commercials & music videos with a focus on live action) and Blink Games (video game development). The group operates from 3 studio locations in London.

== Overview ==
Blink is known for discovering and developing new creative talent. Having started out as a TV commercial production company, Blink has evolved into one of the UK's rising independent entertainment studios with several completed productions and a slate of original IPs in development. Their roster of directorial talent is drawn from a diverse range of backgrounds, whose work incorporates a variety of film crafts, including live-action, stop motion, puppetry, 2D animation and CGI.

=== Blink Industries ===
Blink Industries was founded in 2012 by James Stevenson Bretton to focus on long form development for TV and Film. They are best known for the series Don't Hug Me I'm Scared created by Becky Sloan, Joe Pelling and Baker Terry. After building an audience as a YouTube series running from 2011–2018, where it has reached over 300 million views and 3.3 million subscribers on the platform, it was developed into six 22 minute episodes for Channel 4 with support from the British Film Institute's Young Audiences Content Fund and aired in Autumn 2022. Don't Hug Me I'm Scared was awarded the BAFTA for Outstanding Production Design at the 2023 BAFTA Craft Awards.

Their other major series to date is Dead End: Paranormal Park, created by Hamish Steele. It was developed from Steele's original graphic novel series "Deadendia" into twenty 22 minute episodes for Netflix. Season 1 was released in the summer of 2022 and Season 2 was released soon after in the autumn.

Other notable works include:

- 'All Through The House', an episode in season 2 of Tim Miller & David Fincher's animated anthology series, 'Love, Death & Robots' (Netflix 2021). Directed by Elliot Dear]. 'All Through The House' was awarded an Emmy for Best Character Animation in 2022.
- 'Enkai', an episode of Triggerfish Studios' Afro-futurist animation anthology 'Kizazi Moto: Generation Fire' (Disney+ 2021). Directed by Ng'endo Mukii. Executive Produced by Peter Ramsey.
- 'Peter & The Wolf', a half hour special made in collaboration with BMG for HBO Max & Cartoon Network, with international distribution through BBC Studios. It was developed from the 2003 album & book by Gavin Friday and Bono, who also served as Executive Producers. Directed by Elliot Dear & Stephen McNally and produced by Adriana Piasek Wanski. Proceeds of the film will go to support the Irish Hospice Foundation, as with the original book and album release.

Blink Industries are currently in production on 'The Sunnyridge 3' a 20 x 22 minute episode original series for Disney+. Created and directed by Stevie Gee & Essy May.

In 2012, Blink Industries produced a mini series for Cartoon Network entitled 'The Grumpy King'. Written and directed by Jonny Sabbagh and Will Harper, it was nominated for a BAFTA in 2012.

In 2019, Blink Industries produced 'Get Real Dude' a sketch show pilot written by and starring Edinburgh Comedy Award 2022 winner Sam Campbell for Channel 4. It was directed by Joe Pelling.

=== Blinkink ===
Blinkink was founded by Bart Yates in 2005 to specialise in animation and mixed-media filmmaking, predominantly for commercials, music videos and broadcast promos.

Their projects often make use of a combination of analogue and digital animation techniques, with a focus on unusual characters and comedic storytelling.

They have been the recipients of several advertising industry awards including D&AD (Design & Art Direction) Pencils, British Television Advertising Awards and the Cannes Lions Festival Of Creativity Grand Prix.

Blinkink are active in the UK music industry and have made videos with artists including Dua Lipa, Elton John, Iron Maiden, Ashnikko, Jon Hopkins & Gorillaz.

Notable projects include:

- 'The Bear & The Hare' for British department store chain John Lewis, in their popular series of Christmas commercials. Directed by Elliot Dear. The character animation was led by former Disney animation supervisor Aaron Blaise and featured a Lily Allen re-recording of the Keane ballad 'Somewhere Only We Know' which went on to become a commercial radio success.
- Harvey Nichols 'The Shoplifters' commercial. Directed by Paul Layzell. The commercial won the Film Grand Prix at Cannes Lions Festival of Creativity in 2016 and was featured during the third act of the Danny Boyle film 'T2 Trainspotting'.
- 'The Writing On The Wall' is a music video directed by Nicos Livesey in 2022 for Iron Maiden. The story was written by vocalist Bruce Dickinson and former Pixar animators Mark Andrews and Andrew Gordon contributed as creative directors. The video was incorporated within the concert visuals of Iron Maiden's 'The Future Past' world tour in 2023.
- 'The Return Of Volvy' is a showcase video made for publisher Devolver Digital's presentation at Summer Game Fest 2023. The story follows the rise, fall and reinvention of a fictitious 90s video game mascot, a vole called 'Volvy'.
- 'Tumbleweed' is a branded short film created for Peak Games' 'Toon Blast' series of mobile games. The 3 minute animated short features the game mascots Bruno, Cooper & Wally. It was directed by Louis Clichy and to date has been viewed 154 million times on YouTube.
- 'Club Future Nostalgia' Mixtape, a visualiser for Dua Lipa's 2021 remix album by the Blessed Madonna. It was directed by James Papper, featuring contributions from artistic collaborators including Ignasi Monreal, Jonathan Zwada, Missy Elliott, Hot Chip, Moodymann and Madonna.
- 'Cold Heart' (Pnau Remix). Music video for the Elton John & Dua Lipa duet, directed by Raman Djafari. The video has garnered over 475 million views on YouTube and was incorporated into Elton John's concert visuals for the 'Farewell Yellow Brick Road' tour, which included his Pyramid stage headline set at the 2023 Glastonbury Festival.

=== Blink Productions ===
Blink Productions was founded in 1985 by producer James Studholme and director Bob Lawrie, originally with a reputation of being a "quirky, small animation shop" before they reinvented the company as a live action commercials operation during the first half of the 1990s. Michelle Jaffe joined the company in 1991 as a live action producer and became a partner in 1997, with responsibility for operations and production.

Lawrie left the company in 1999 while Studholme went on to lead the company through its expansion and evolution over the subsequent decades.

Blink has represented many of the industry's renowned directors, often during the breakthrough stage of their career, some of whom have also progressed into successful film and television careers as well. Examples include Dougal Wilson, Nick Ball, Ivan Zacharias, Tom Kingsley, Aoife McArdle, Ben Wheatley, Andreas Nilsson, David Wilson, Pedro Martin Calero, Mark Denton, Blue Source, Juan Cabral, Adam Smith, Benito Montorio, Tom Tagholm, and Chris Sweeney. During the 2000s, Blink Productions provided the foundation to launch a number of specialised sub-divisions in addition to Blinkink and Blink Industries. These included Major Tom (music for film & tv), Colonel Blimp (music videos), Blink Art (illustration & photography) and White Lodge (fashion film).

Blink Productions has remained the group's live-action commercial focused division throughout its history. Blink's peers within the advertising industry have credited the company's success to a "clever diversity of a brand giving it greater longevity and taking full advantage of an expanding marketplace".

Paul Weston joined the group as Executive Producer of Colonel Blimp in 2013. Colonel Blimp merged into Blink Productions in 2017 and Weston became the Managing Director of Blink Productions in 2022.

Blink have made commercials for major brands including IKEA, Guinness, BBC, Nike, Cadbury, John Lewis, Channel 4, Harvey Nichols, giffgaff, FIFA and Virgin.

Blink / Colonel Blimp have produced music videos for artists including Björk, The Weeknd, Dua Lipa, Sad Night Dynamite, Lily Allen, Will Young, Coldplay, Rag'n'Bone Man, The Streets, Bree Runway, George Michael, U2, Tinie Tempah, The Maccabees, Bat for Lashes, and Declan McKenna.

Blink Productions has been the recipient of numerous industry accolades. It was named the UK's "Production Company of the Year" by Campaign in 1996, 2011 and 2012, by Televisual Magazine in 2013, 2014, 2015, and 2016 and at the British Arrow Awards in 2013 and 2015.

Blink has also been the recipient of the Cannes Lions Festival of Creativity Grand Prix in 2008, 2015, and 2016.

Notable Projects include:

- "We're the Superhumans" for Channel 4's Rio Paralympics coverage in 2016. Directed by Dougal Wilson, the ad was launched in 2016 as part of the channel's Year of Disability and features a cast of more than 140 people with disabilities. It won the Film Grand Prix at the 2017 Cannes Lion Festival.
- Blink has produced several of the popular John Lewis Christmas commercial series - these were directed by Dougal Wilson and soundtracked by cover versions of famous songs by contemporary musical artists. Released in 2011, 'The Long Wait' featured a cover of The Smiths' Please, Please, Please Let Me Get What I Want by Slow Moving Millie. Wilson went on to direct 'The Journey]' (2012), 'Monty's Christmas', (2014) 'Buster The Boxer' (2016) and 'Excitable Edgar' (2019).
- The Weeknd 'Secrets' Music video. Directed by Pedro Martin Calero, the video was filmed against the Brutalist architecture of the University of Toronto Scarborough and the Toronto Reference Library. Featuring fellow Canadian singer, Black Atlass, the music video has culminated 205 million views on YouTube to date.
- 'Gorilla', a commercial directed by Juan Cabral for Cadbury. The advert first aired in 2007 and features an actor in a gorilla costume drumming to 'In The Air Tonight' by Phil Collins. 'Gorilla' was voted ITV's favourite TV advert of 2007 and 5th best advert of the decade in an online poll by tellyads.com. It also won numerous top advertising industry awards, such as the Film Grand Prix Lion at the Cannes Lions 2008, Gold at the British Television Advertising Awards in 2008, and Black and Yellow Pencils at the D&AD Awards 2008.

== Awards and nominations ==
=== Berlin Music Video Awards ===
The Berlin Music Video Awards is an international company that promotes the art of music videos.

| Year | Nominee | Award | Result | Ref. |
|---|---|---|---|---|
| 2025 | BLINKINK | Best Production Company | Nominated | |
