= British Television Advertising Awards =

Advertising awards body

The British Arrows (formerly the British Television Advertising Awards (BTAA)) is an advertising awards body in London, which honours the best moving image advertising in the UK.

Founded in 1976, the British Arrows awards advertising agencies and production companies across a number of categories. Awards include Advertising Agency of the Year, Production Company of the Year and Commercial of the Year. In 1996 the CRAFT AWARDS, held in November, were founded, honouring the best craftspeople in advertising and awarded individuals across a number of categories, including Director, Editing and Casting. Special awards including Best Crafted Commercial of the Year were also awarded. For each show, a Chair of the Jury is selected by the Board of Directors. The Chair then curates their own Jury from a range of disciplines who watch and discuss all commercials entered.

In 2017, after 40 years of AWARDS and 20 years of CRAFT, the two shows were combined to create The British Arrows.

== Tour ==
The Walker Art Center began screening the British Television Advertising Awards in 1986, when the program was part of a tour that was facilitated by the BTAA and the Film Department of the Museum of Modern Art. Walker had a strong interest in advertising and design and had been screening the Clio Awards for many years, so there was a natural curiosity about foreign commercials. Major companies such as Target, Best Buy and General Mills are based in the Twin Cities and bring creative teams over to screenings, as do other advertising agencies like Fallon. Watching the awards in a cinematic setting provides a unique communal screening experience that has broadened the program to a general audience of Anglophiles, film students, and the press who attend annually.

In December each year, over 27,000 people attend over 90 screenings of the latest British Arrows Awards showreel at Walker. It’s a much-loved program in the Twin Cities with many people attending year after year. The audiences are moved by the program, which can be a unique cross cultural experience, as they try to figure out brands and products that are not available in the U.S., but are cleverly conveyed. It’s a unique experience for American audiences to view ads that are not invested in the hard sell; rather, gaining interest in products and services through humour, pathos and a dynamic cinematography. Each year a member of the British Arrows board attends the presentation, introduces the program on the opening night and handles interviews on TV, radio and the press.

Alongside the Walker Art Center the British Arrows Awards has also been screened at the Cincinnati World Cinema, Cleveland Cinematheque, Hong Kong Arts Centre, Memphis Brooks Museum of Art, Milwaukee Film Festival, Museum of Fine Arts Houston, Northwest Film Center, Smith San Rafael Film Center, The Institute of Contemporary Art Boston, Wisconsin Film Festival and Yerba Buena Center for the Arts.

From 2017 winning commercials from both types of British Arrows categories will be shown on tour.
