= Compton Cookout =

2010 student event mocking Black History Month

The Compton Cookout was an off-campus event organized by several fraternities and hosted by several University of California, San Diego (UCSD) students; it was held on February 15, 2010. The party, which gained national attention, was intended to mock and ridicule Black History Month. Attendees were invited to wear costumes that stereotyped minorities living in ghettos, particularly African Americans. The event was widely criticized and was followed by several racially charged chalk graffiti incidents targeting specific ethnic and minority groups, eventually earning Winter Quarter 2010 the dubious nickname of "Black Winter."

== Compton Cookout Party ==
On February 15, 2010 several UCSD students, many of whom were members of Greek letter organizations, hosted a racially themed party they dubbed the "Compton Cookout". Hosted off campus and intended to mock Black History Month, the party's Facebook event description included instructions for attendees to dress in stereotypical ghetto outfits. In the days following the party a representative of the controversial satirical college paper Koala covered the party in a news broadcast, using a racial slur to refer to black UCSD students. A noose was also found hanging in UCSD's main library, prompting students to protest the campus's racial environment by occupying the chancellor's office. UCSD responded by announcing a new diversity campaign, Not in Our Community, and held a teach-in in the Price Center East Ballroom, as well as carrying out long standing demands presented by the Black Student Union. Approximately a month later, a KKK Hood was found on the head of the statue of Dr. Seuss outside of Geisel Library, which Angela Wai-Yin Kong tied into the "tense racial campus climate" following the Compton Cookout.

== Black Winter ==
The winter quarter during which the Compton Cookout took place is known by students and faculty at UCSD as Black Winter. Racially motivated events that occurred during this time, in addition to the cookout, included a KKK hood being found on a statue of Dr. Seuss and the discovery of a noose in the main library. In response to these events, the Black Student Union (BSU) at UCSD organized a series of marches, protests, and rallies in coordination with other groups like M.E.Ch.A. The University Administration also responded to the events by organizing a series of teach-ins. The BSU criticized the teach-ins, which they deemed ineffective. Several BSU members attended one of the teach-ins wearing T-shirts reading "real pain, real action" and after an hour of listening, BSU leader Jasmine Phillips announced that the teach-ins would not solve the problem and that they wanted "real action", before escorting hundreds of students out of the teach-in. BSU made a list of 32 demands related to having a more racially inclusive campus which included a center for African-American students, a task-force to hire more African American faculty, and multiple efforts to increase enrollment of African American students, an African American Studies Minor, a Vice Chancellor of Diversity, Equity, and Inclusion (DEI), and requirement for all students to take a class related to DEI.

== Response from the university ==
After the Compton Cookout the university held a teach-in on racial tolerance. This teach-in however, fell short as students walked out and protested outside. "About 3,000 people gathered at the teach-in and resulting demonstration -- with whites making up about half of the crowd." Since, the university has implemented many programs and initiatives to further enhance the experience of students of color. The Office for Equity, Diversity, and Inclusion created a DEI Unit plan that depicted strategic goals, initiatives, and their accomplishments. The university has also implemented the Black Academic Excellence Initiative since February 2016. The vision of this program was to increase the population of black students and faculty. Additionally, the initiative intended to increase scholarship and funding to promote the success of black student, staff, and faculty. The university also established the Black Resource Center as well as the Raza Resource Centro. Students chose both the location and appoint who was in charge. The Black Resource Center was established officially in May 2013. The Raza Resource Centro was established in April 2014. In 2011, it became a university requirement to take a DEI Diversity, Equity, and Inclusion course. The criteria that these courses must fulfill are in frameworks, subject matter, and pedagogy.

== "Dear White People" ==
Justin Simein, the writer of the Netflix show "Dear White People" and the 2014 movie of the same title used a blackface party at a primarily white university as a major plot point, Simein was originally conflicted about including a blackface party at the end of his film because he thought that it would be criticized as a thing of the past that doesn't occur on college campuses anymore, but after hearing about the Compton Cookout, decided to put the event into his film. According to SF Gate, Simien stated, "I took the blackface party out because I thought it was too outlandish." Simien explained, "Then when that happened at UC San Diego, I sort of rabbit-holed down the research path, (thinking) 'Oh, I wasn’t pushing buttons. I was talking about something that actually happens."
