= Talia Reese =

American comedian

Talia Reese is an American comedian known for combining her Orthodox Jewish lifestyle with her career in standup.

== Early life and education ==
Reese grew up in Great Neck, New York and aspired to be a Broadway star. Reese acted in school plays and performed comedy in high school. She noted that other girls wanted to be pretty, while she would "throw on a wig and be the wackiest character". She attended the same high school as Sarah Sherman. At the University of Pennsylvania, Reese performed with the all-female comedy group the Bloomers. She grew up Reform and became Orthodox during college. She attended Cardozo Law School.

== Career ==
Reese worked as a bankruptcy attorney at Paul Weiss before switching to standup. When she performs at Stand Up NY, Comic Strip Live, and other clubs, her material covers 'usual' topics like sex and family life. At Caroline's, she joked that her first husband would "come home, walk up [to the bedroom] and say... ‘scooch down’" as if for a pap smear. When she performs for Orthodox Jewish audiences, she adds jokes about her monthly visits to the mikveh, declaring “After all that, I should be able to go home with any man I want!” She does not perform on Friday nights because she observes the Jewish Sabbath, noting "Basically I'm available 24/6." Consequently, she has declined opportunities including an assistant position on SNL. Her Jewish dietary restrictions have required bringing her own food on the road, even going to sound check with a "pot of kosher meatballs".

Reese's comedic influences include Joan Rivers, Sarah Silverman, Rita Rudner, Dave Attell and Sebastian Maniscalco. She incorporated Caroline Rhea's advice to "speak urgently, like she’s talking to a friend on stage". Reese has opened for Rhea, Nick DiPaolo, and Ashley Blaker.

Reese has touched on gender-based expectations, joking that her parents “did not want a daughter doing stand-up. I mean, they did not want a daughter…,” trailing off to indicate their disappointment. Reese has been described as a 'momedian' and has joked “Babies are like beer. There’s a lot of pressure to have another from people who should have stopped a long time ago.”

After the October 7 attacks and subsequent war, Reese said she "didn’t think anything was really going to be funny again,” but noted that Jewish communities sought her comedy to cope with the stress and sadness, increasing her bookings.

== Awards ==
Top Female Comedian of the Year, International Association of Top Professionals (IAOTP), 2024

== Personal life ==
Reese's husband is also a Jewish lawyer. She is descended from Bukharan Jews. After maternity leave, she wrote romance novels.
