= Talia (surname) =

Talia is a surname. Notable people with the surname include:

- Daniel Talia (born 1991), Australian rules football player, brother of Michael
- Frank Talia (born 1972), Australian former football goalkeeper
- Michael Talia (born 1993), former Australian rules footballer, brother of Daniel
- Milack Talia (born 1977), American politician

== See also ==
- Rashid Ṭaliʽa (1877–1926), Jordanian politician
