= Live Hot Puppet Chat =

- Starring: Tristan Newcomb (all the puppets), Jesse Chapo (as various Jesses), Brian Ugia (as Blinky the Robot), and H.L (as Carmen)
- Country of origin: United States
- No. of episodes: Six (plus several test & cameo segments). In broadcast order: Skiddles, Prickle, Al the Slug, Reducey-Risk Reindeer, Barry Bible, Dobo Disty

Production
- Producer: Tristan Newcomb

Original release
- Network: SRTV
- Release: September 2005 – November 2005

Live Hot Puppet Chat is an adult-themed puppet show, originally broadcast on a university television station (SRTV) in the Fall of 2005 at the University of California, San Diego, with a series of shows jokingly titled "Season 2" (never having really had a first season). The six episodes were written and performed by Tristan Newcomb, and each episode had a different host: they were, in broadcast order, Skiddles, Prickle, Al the Slug, Reducey-Risk Reindeer, Barry Bible, and Dobo Disty (aka Nintendobo).

The theme of the show was that, in-between the scripted moments of puppet monologue, university students would telephone the show and try to shock the puppets with as controversial a question or comment as possible. According to the description on the uploaded sample clips, this was an experiment, "to see if it was possible for a non-human to transgress boundaries of political correctness and actually give offense to the student population."

Some students began to issue complaints to college officials. After episode six, the student-run television station was shut down upon charges of obscenity, stemming from the blasphemy of the Barry Bible episode, along with the university administration's displeasure with a previous pair of pornographic broadcasts on the same student channel.

A retail DVD was released of all the 2005 episodes, with the satirical title Greatest Hits: Season 2. Afterwards, the puppet characters appeared in many clips around the web, often in spin-off series such as Executive Inbox, Carpe Diem in Fur and Nintendobo. The videos stopped being produced once the puppeteer, Tristan Newcomb, began doing theater pieces that simulated catastrophic software demonstrations.

In August 2009, a feature-length Live Hot Puppet Chat movie was produced by Lumalin Films, Sword of Digestive Calmness. In June 2010, a second feature film starring a Live Hot Puppet Chat character was released, Only Interstellar Pinball Lives Forever., followed by 2011's Summer of the Chew Toy Soul, 2013's Jesus Hates You Now, and 2014's Hell Leaks Laughter.
