= Adult puppeteering =

Puppets performed for adult audiences

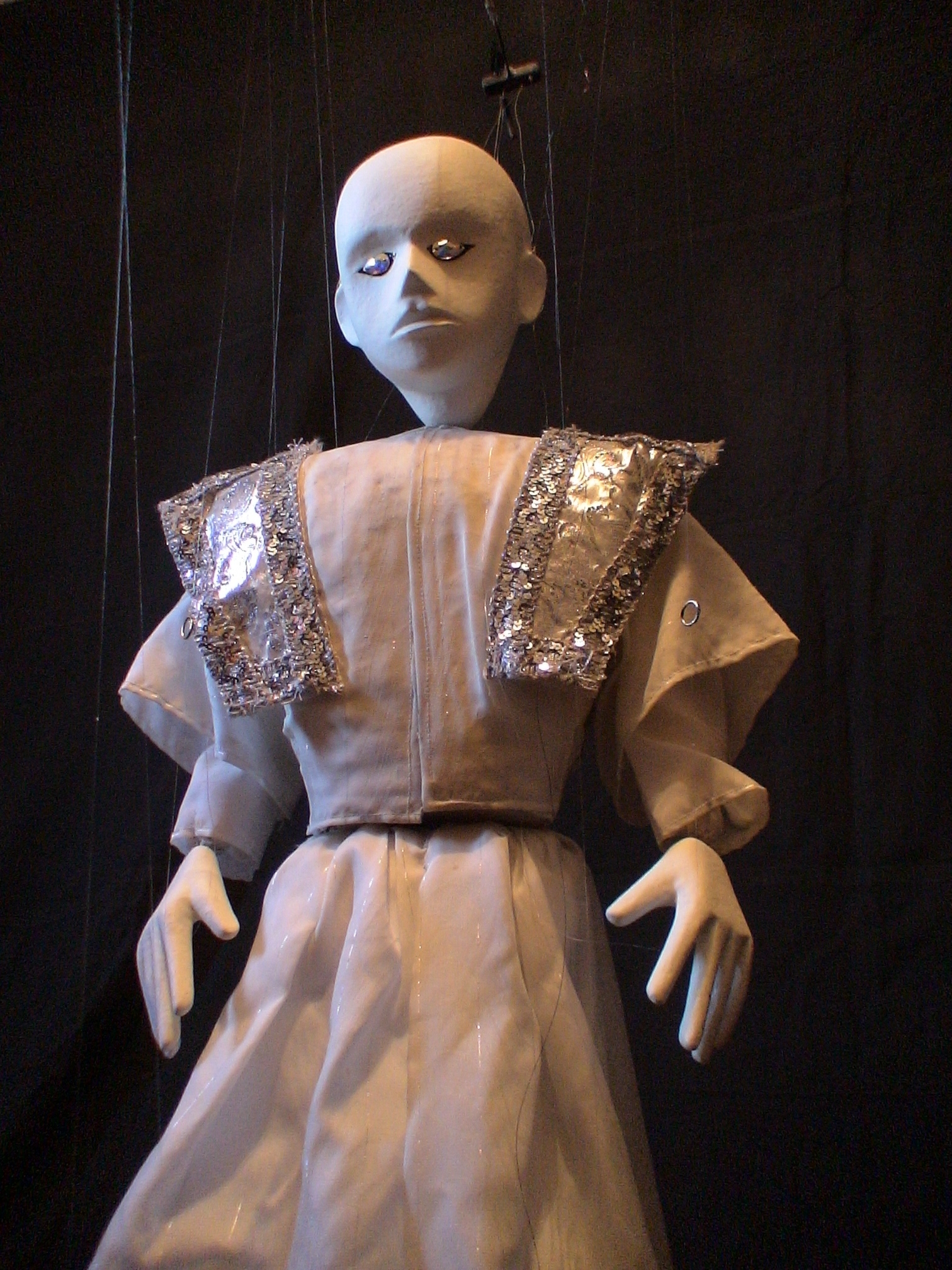
Puppet from "Cabaret of Metamorphoses" of Nikolai Zykov

Adult puppeteering is the use of puppets in contexts aimed at adult audiences. Serious theatrical pieces can use puppets, either for aesthetic reasons, or to achieve special effects that would otherwise be impossible with human actors. In parts of the world where puppet shows have traditionally been children's entertainment, many find the notion of puppets in decidedly adult situations—for example, involving drugs, sex, profanity, or violence—to be humorous, because of the bizarre contrast it creates between subject matter and characters.

Adult puppeteering appears in many forms. In the US and UK it is more easily found on screen. Television satire such as the UK's Spitting Image provides a strong link to the earlier traditions of Punch and Judy or Commedia dell'Arte as sources of social and political commentary. Puppetry sitcoms such as the US series Dinosaurs feature puppet characters who are entertaining in themselves, not as satirical figures. Adult puppet theatre has a strong tradition in Asia and parts of Europe, and has a smaller presence in Australia, the UK and the US. Handspan Theatre from Melbourne, Australia, toured internationally with its innovative and often surreal adult productions.

== Puppeteers and companies that perform for adult audiences ==
- Richard Bradshaw
- The Bread & Puppet Theater
- Ronnie Burkett
- Nina Conti
- Jeff Dunham
- Ed the Sock
- Jim Henson
- In the Heart of the Beast Puppet and Mask Theater
- Lisa Sturz; Red Herring Puppets
- Sergey Obraztsov
- Otto Petersen
- Paul Zaloom
- Nikolai Zykov
- Randy Feltface
- Thalias Kompagnons
- Manual Cinema

== Television programs ==
- Sam and Friends (1955–61) - WRC-TV
- The Muppet Show (1976-1981) - ITV (UK), Syndication (US)
- Spitting Image (1984–96, 2020-21) - ITV (1984–96), Britbox (2020-21)
- Rubbery Figures (1984–90) - ABC Australia, Seven Network
- ALF (1986–1990)
- D.C. Follies (1987–89)
- Les Guignols de l'Info (1988–2018) - Canal+ France
- Mystery Science Theater 3000 (1988–99, 2017)- KTMA-TV, Comedy Central, Syfy, Netflix
- The Jim Henson Hour (1989) - NBC
- Dinosaurs (1991–94) - ABC
- Muppets Tonight (1996-1998) - ABC (1996), Disney Channel (1997-1998)
- Aliens in the Family (1996) - ABC
- Lost on Earth (1997) - USA Network
- Triumph the Insult Comic Dog (1997) on Late Night with Conan O'Brien - NBC
- Sifl and Olly (1997–99) - MTV
- A Scare at Bedtime (1997–2005) - RTÉ
- The Man Show (1999) episodes - puppet porn - Comedy Central
- Farscape (1999–2003) - Sci-Fi Channel
- TV Funhouse spin-off series (2000–01) - Comedy Central
- Greg the Bunny (2000–02, 2005) - Manhattan Neighborhood Network, IFC, Fox
- Puppets Who Kill (2002–06) - The Comedy Network
- Crank Yankers (2002–07) - Comedy Central, MTV2
- Chappelle's Show (2003) episode - STD puppets
- The Bronx Bunny Show (2003/07) - Channel 4, Starz!
- "Smile Time", an episode of Angel (2004) - The WB
- Wonder Showzen (2005) - MTV
- Live Hot Puppet Chat (2005) - SRTV
- Las noticias del guiñol - Canal+ Spain
- Le Bébête Show (1983–95) - TF1 France
- Polskie Zoo (1991–93) - TVP 1 Poland
- Куклы (1994-2002) - NTV Russia
- Ed's Night Party (1995-2010) - Citytv Canada
- 31 Minutos (2003-2005, 2014) - Televisón Nacional de Chile, TV Chile
- Fur TV (2008) - MTV
- The Podge and Rodge Show (2006–2009)- RTÉ
- Mr. Meaty (2006-2009) - Nickelodeon, CBC Television
- Mongrels (2010) - BBC Three - UK
- Warren the Ape (2010) - MTV
- Don't Hug Me I'm Scared (2011-2016, 2022) - YouTube, Channel 4
- Yonderland (2013-2016) - Sky UK
- The Muppets (2015-2016) - ABC
- Newzoids (2015–16) - ITV
- The Gorburger Show (2017) - Comedy Central
- Massive Monster Mayhem (2017-2018) - Nickelodeon, TeenNick, Family Channel
- The Dark Crystal: Age of Resistance (2019) - Netflix
- Smiling Friends (Puppet Version) (2024) - Adult Swim

== Films ==
- Let My Puppets Come (1976) US
- The Dark Crystal (1982) US
- Gremlins (1984) US
- The Pied Piper (1985) Czechoslovakia
- Ghoulies (1985) US
- Short Circuit (1986) US
- Labyrinth (1986) US
- Short Circuit 2 (1988) US
- Meet the Feebles (1989) NZ
- Puppet Master (1989) US
- Gremlins 2: The New Batch (1990) US
- Mystery Science Theater 3000: The Movie (1996) US
- Being John Malkovich (1999) US
- Little Nicky (2000) US
- Team America: World Police (2004) US
- Strings (2004) Denmark/Sweden/Norway/UK
- Live Freaky! Die Freaky! (2004) US
- Demon Days Live (2006) UK
- Dante's Inferno (2007) US
- The Happytime Murders (2018)
- Abruptio (2023)
- Strays (2023)
- Buddy (2026)

== Live performance ==
- Puppetry of the Penis (1997–2005) Australia
- Avenue Q (2003–Present)
- Otto & George (ventriloquist and dummy)
- Jim Henson's Puppet Up! Uncensored (2006–present)
- Tommy Murphy's Holding the Man, a play aimed at an adult audience features some puppetry

== See also ==
- Puppeteer
- Adult animation
- List of stop-motion films
- Kenya Institute of Puppet Theatre (KIPT)
