= Narcissus 'Thalia' =

Daffodil cultivar

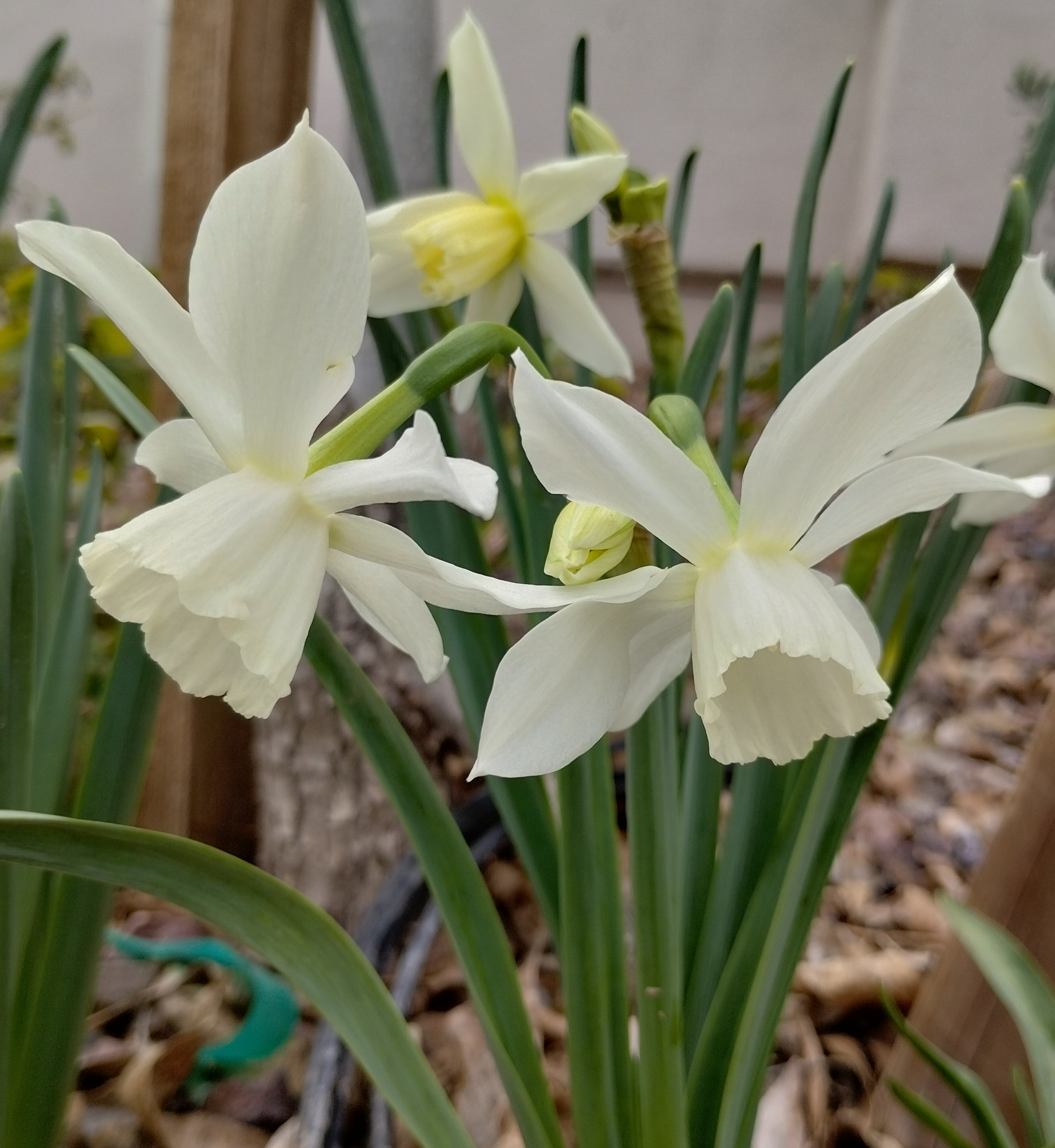
- Genus: Narcissus
- Hybrid parentage: Narcissus triandrus subsp. triandrus var. triandrus × Unknown
- Cultivar group: Division 5
- Cultivar: 'Thalia'
- Breeder: M. van Waveren and Sons
- Origin: Hillegom, Netherlands

Narcissus 'Thalia', also sometimes known as the orchid Narcissus, is a cultivar of daffodil, which was bred by M. van Waveren and Sons of Hillegom in 1916. The cultivar was produced by hybridizing an unnamed daffodil with Narcissus triandrus subsp. triandrus var. triandrus.

== Description ==
Narcissus 'Thalia' is a clump forming bulbous perennial, which can reach heights of 50cm tall. Plants possess green foliage and produce flowers in mid spring. Each bulb will produce a stem which can hold 2-3 flowers per stem. Blooms are sweetly scented. Flowers possess slightly reflexed petals and are about 5cm across with small cup-like coronas.
