= MV Thalia =

Thalia was the name of two motor vessels operated by Dampfschiffahrts-Gesellschaft Neptun (Neptun Line).

- MV Thalia (1936), requisitioned in 1939 by the Kriegsmarine, surrendered to the United Kingdom in 1945 and renamed Empire Consett
- MV Thalia (1955), sold in 1971 to Greece
