= Thalias Kompagnons =

Thalias Kompagnons is the name of a German puppet theatre in Nuremberg, managed by the puppeteers and directors Joachim Torbahn and Tristan Vogt. Their repertoire consists of shows for both adults and children.

== History ==
The puppet theatre was founded in 1990 as a professional freelance touring company by the name of "Tristans Kompagnons". In 2006 the puppeteers changed the name of the theatre to Thalias Kompagnons. From 1997 to 2008 they ran the Nuremberg "Theater der Puppen im KaLi" in partnership with the "Theater Salz & Pfeffer". They give guest performances all around the world, and their work has been awarded several prizes, e.g. the Preis der Stadt Nürnberg for art and science in 2008.

== Ensemble ==
Joachim Torbahn studied art in Vienna and worked as set-designer for several opera houses and theatres. He has been designing the stage sets and puppets for Thalias Kompagnons since 1990; since 1998 he has also been working as a puppeteer for the theatre. Tristan Vogt studied German literature and sociology; since 1990 he has been working full-time as puppeteer, author and director. Both members of the ensemble give guest lectures at the Ernst Busch School for Performing Arts (in the puppet-show department) in Berlin.

== Classification ==
The productions of Thalias Kompagnons represent mixtures of puppetry, drama and music theatre. They generally belong to the genre of puppet theatre, which makes use of the dramatic technique of animation. With their painting-theatre productions – live painting to music – Thalias Kompagnons created a special synthesis of art and theatre: as the puppeteer tells a story which, like his painting, develops and changes, he simultaneously demonstrates the techniques of painting. Thalias Kompagnons were influenced by the Ernst Busch School. They treat the traditions of folk drama with affectionate irony and often play with the conventions of the classic German "Kasperle-Theater" show. Apart from playing with hand puppets on a fourth-wall stage, the actor-puppeteers are actually seen on stage making use of other playing materials as well (e.g. masks, table puppets, simple objects, video projections).

== Selected productions ==
- Kafka's Castle. A power game (2009) – Kafka's novel fragment as malicious round of intrigues, struggles for power and double binds
- Goblin, James and Ballerina (2008) – live painting to music based on the fairytale The Steadfast Tin Soldier by Hans Christian Andersen
- Magic Flute – An Examination (2006) – Mozart's opera played with puppets, sung by a countertenor (Daniel Gloger) and accompanied by a live orchestra (ensembleKONTRASTE)
- Macbeth for Beginners (2004) based on a play by Gigio Brunello and Gyula Molnàr – anarchistic version of Shakespeare's classic drama, in which Kasperle ambitiously wants to be Macbeth
- What does Red do on Thursday? (2004) – the painter narrates a story of creation and shows his reverence to Paul Klee, accompanied by music by Ravel and Debussy
- Hansel & Gretel (2002) by Fitzgerald Kusz – satirical version of Grimms' fairytale in East Franconian dialect
- Dwarfs. A Franconian Passion (2000) by Fitzgerald Kusz – laconic miniature dramas, lyric monologues and the romantic kunstlied
- Wagner's Ring. An Opera (1998) – the whole of Richard Wagner's Ring in just two hours
