= Moscow Boys Choir =

The Moscow Boys Choir (Russian: Московский хор мальчиков) is a choral group of boys from Moscow, Russia.

== History ==
Founded in 1957, the performing chorus is an all-boy choir under the direction of Leonid Baklushin.

== Voices & Performances ==
Although most of the boys are sopranos, the adolescents also attain bass, baritone, and tenor range. There are usually 28–35 voices.
