= Schwalbe =

Schwalbe (German for swallow) may refer to:

== Technology ==
- Raab-Katzenstein KL.1 Schwalbe, German biplane produced in the 1920s
- Schwalbe (tire manufacturer), a brand name of Ralf Bohle GmbH
- Simson KR 51/2 Schwalbe, a motorcycle manufactured by Simson

== Military ==
- Messerschmitt Me 262 Schwalbe, the first functional jet fighter
- Schwalbe-class cruiser, German class of unprotected cruiser ships
- SMS Schwalbe, three ships of the German and Austro-Hungarian Navies

== Medicine ==
- Schwalbe's line, anatomical line on the interior surface of the eye's cornea, named for Gustav Schwalbe

== Sports ==
- Die Schwalbe, a German chess composition society, and its magazine, Die Schwalbe
- FC Schwalbe Hannover, a German rugby union club
- Diving (association football), an attempt by a player to gain an unfair advantage by diving to the ground

== Surname ==
- Ernst Schwalbe (1871–1920), German pathologist
- Felix Schwalbe (1892–1974), German Wehrmacht general
- Gustav Albert Schwalbe (1844-1916), German anatomist and anthropologist
- Gustav Christian Schwabe (1813–1897), German-born merchant and financier
- Harry O. Schwalbe (1874–1935), American businessman
- Ingeborg Schwalbe (1935), German athlete
- Mary Anne Schwalbe (1934–2009), American university administrator and refugee worker
- Michel Schwalbé (1919–2012), French-Polish violinist
- Nina Schwalbe (1966), American public health researcher
- Ole Schwalbe (1929–1990), Danish painter
- William Schwalbe (1962), American author

== Other uses ==
- Schwalbe V, subcamp of the Buchenwald concentration camp in Berga / Elster
