= Randy Shilts Award =

Annual literary award for gay nonfiction

- Awarded for: Non-fiction of relevance to the gay community
- Sponsored by: Publishing Triangle
- Reward: US$1,000
- Established: 1997
- Website: http://www.publishingtriangle.org

The Randy Shilts Award is an annual literary award, presented by Publishing Triangle to honour works of non-fiction of relevance to the gay community. First presented in 1997, the award was named in memory of American journalist Randy Shilts.

== Recipients ==
Award winners and finalists
Year	Author	Title	Publisher	Result	Ref.
1997	Anthony Heilbut	Thomas Mann		Winner	
1997	Keith Boykin	One More River to Cross		Finalist	
1997	Mark Doty	Heaven's Coast		Finalist	
1998	David Sedaris	Naked		Winner	
1998	Daniel Harris	The Rise and Fall of Gay Culture		Finalist	
1998	Gabriel Rotello	Sexual Ecology		Finalist	
1999	John Loughery	The Other Side of Silence		Winner	
1999	Michael Bronski	The Pleasure Principle		Finalist	
1999	Richard Rambuss	Closer Devotions		Finalist	
2000	Eric Brandt (ed.)	Dangerous Liaisons: Blacks, Gays, and the Struggle for Equality	The New Press	Winner	
2000	James M. Saslow	Pictures and Passions	Viking Press	Finalist	
2000	John Manual Andriote	Victory Deferred	University of Chicago Press	Finalist	
2001	Mark Matousek	The Boy He Left Behind: A Man's Search for His Lost Father	Riverhead Books	Winner	
2001	Beth Loffreda	Losing Matt Shepard	Columbia University Press	Finalist	
2001	Ned Rorem	Lies: A Diary 1986–1999	Counterpoint	Finalist	
2002	Ricardo J. Brown	The Evening Crowd at Kirmser's	University of Minnesota Press	Winner	
2002	Robert Reid-Pharr	Black Gay Man	New York University Press	Winner	
2002	Barry Werth	The Scarlet Professor	Doubleday	Finalist	
2003	Neil Miller	Sex Crime Panic	Alyson Books	Winner	
2003	Colm Tóibín	Love in a Dark Time: And Other Explorations of Gay Lives and Literature	Scribner	Finalist	
2003	Richard Bruce Nugent, edited by Thomas H. Wirth	Gay Rebel of the Harlem Renaissance	Duke University Press	Finalist	
2004	John D'Emilio	Lost Prophet: The Life and Times of Bayard Rustin	Free Press	Winner	
2004	Augusten Burroughs	Dry	St. Martin's Press	Finalist	
2004	Dale Peck	What We Lost	Houghton Mifflin	Finalist	
2005	David K. Johnson	The Lavender Scare: The Cold War Persecution of Gays and Lesbians in the Federal Government	University of Chicago Press	Winner	
2005	David Carter	Stonewall: The Riots That Sparked the Gay Revolution	St. Martin's Press	Finalist	
2005	Graham Robb	Strangers: Homosexual Love in the Nineteenth Century	W. W. Norton	Finalist	
2006	Martin Moran	The Tricky Part	Beacon Press	Winner	
2006	Neil McKenna	The Secret Life of Oscar Wilde	Basic Books	Finalist	
2006	Thomas Glave	Words to Our Now	University of Minnesota Press	Finalist	
2007	Kenji Yoshino	Covering	Random House	Winner	
2007	Bernard Cooper	The Bill from My Father	Simon & Schuster	Finalist	
2007	Rigoberto González	Butterfly Boy	University of Wisconsin Press	Finalist	
2008	Michael Rowe	Other Men's Sons	Cormorant Books	Winner	
2008	Martin Duberman	The Worlds of Lincoln Kirstein	Alfred A. Knopf	Finalist	
2008	Michael S. Sherry	Gay Artists in Modern American Culture	University of North Carolina Press	Finalist	
2009	Kai Wright	Drifting Toward Love	Beacon Press	Winner	
2009	Bob Morris	Assisted Loving	Harper/HarperCollins	Finalist	
2009	Linas Alsenas	Gay America	Amulet Books/Abrams	Finalist	
2010	James Davidson	The Greeks and Greek Love	Random House	Winner	
2010	Chad Heap	Slumming: Sexual and Racial Encounters in American Nightlife	University of Chicago Press	Finalist	
2010	David Plante	The Pure Lover	Beacon Press	Finalist	
2011	Justin Spring	Secret Historian: The Life and Times of Samuel Steward	Farrar, Straus and Giroux	Winner	
2011	R. Tripp Evans	Grant Wood	Alfred A. Knopf	Finalist	
2011	Wendy Moffat	A Great Unrecorded History: A New Life of E. M. Forster	Farrar, Straus and Giroux	Finalist	
2012	Mark D. Jordan	Recruiting Young Love: How Christians Talk About Homosexuality	University of Chicago Press	Winner	
2012	Martin Duberman	A Saving Remnant: The Radical Lives of Barbara Deming and David McReynolds	The New Press	Finalist	
2012	Michael Bronski	A Queer History of the United States	Beacon Press	Finalist	
2013	Christopher Bram	Eminent Outlaws	Twelve/Hachette	Winner	
2013	Cynthia Carr	Fire in the Belly: The Life and Times of David Wojnarowicz	Bloomsbury	Finalist	
2013	David M. Halperin	How to Be Gay	Belknap/Harvard University Press	Finalist	
2013	Lisa Jarnot	Robert Duncan: The Ambassador from Venus	University of California Press	Finalist	
2014	Hilton Als	White Girls	McSweeney's	Winner	
2014	Jim Elledge	Henry Darger: Throwaway Boy	Overlook	Finalist	
2014	Lori Duron	Raising My Rainbow: Adventures in Raising a Fabulous Gender Creative Son	Broadway Books	Finalist	
2014	Susana Peña	Oye Loca: From the Mariel Boat Lift to Gay Cuban Miami	University of Minnesota Press	Finalist	
2015	Robert Beachy	Gay Berlin	Alfred A. Knopf	Winner	
2015	Martin Duberman	Hold Tight Gently: Michael Callen, Essex Hemphill, and the Battlefield of AIDS	The New Press	Finalist	
2015	Philip Gefter	Wagstaff: Before and After Mapplethorpe	Liveright/W. W. Norton	Finalist	
2015	Richard Blanco	The Prince of Los Cocuyos	Ecco/HarperCollins	Finalist	
2016	Barney Frank	Frank: A Life in Politics from the Great Society to Same-Sex Marriage	Farrar, Straus and Giroux	Winner	
2016	Michelangelo Signorile	It's Not Over: Getting Beyond Tolerance, Defeating Homophobia, and Winning True Equality	Houghton Mifflin Harcourt	Winner	
2016	Dale Peck	Visions and Revisions: Coming of Age in the Age of AIDS	Soho Press	Finalist	
2016	Matthew Spender	A House in St. John's Wood: In Search of My Parents	Farrar, Straus and Giroux	Finalist	
2017	David France	How to Survive a Plague	Alfred A. Knopf	Winner	
2017	Kevin Mumford	Not Straight, Not White: Black Gay Men from the March on Washington to the AIDS Crisis	University of North Carolina Press	Finalist	
2017	Paul Lisicky	The Narrow Door	Graywolf Press	Finalist	
2017	Will Schwalbe	Books for Living	Alfred A. Knopf	Finalist	
2018	Eli Clare	Brilliant Imperfection	Duke University Press	Winner	
2018	Chike Frankie Edozien	Lives of Great Men	Team Angelica Publishing	Finalist	
2018	Peter Gajdics	The Inheritance of Shame	Brown Paper Press	Finalist	
2018	Richard A. McKay	Patient Zero and the Making of the AIDS Epidemic	University of Chicago Press	Finalist	
2019	Alexander Chee	How to Write an Autobiographical Novel	Houghton Mifflin Harcourt	Winner	
2019	Jeffrey C. Stewart	The New Negro: The Life of Alain Locke	Yale University Press	Finalist	
2019	Lillian Faderman	Harvey Milk	Yale University Press	Finalist	
2019	Robert W. Fieseler	Tinderbox: The Untold Story of the Up Stairs Lounge Fire and Rise of Gay Liberation	Liveright/W. W. Norton	Finalist	
2020	Saeed Jones	How We Fight for Our Lives	Simon & Schuster	Winner	
2020	New York Public Library (ed.)	The Stonewall Reader	Penguin Books	Finalist	
2020	David K. Johnson	Buying Gay	Columbia University Press	Finalist	
2020	Hugh Ryan	When Brooklyn Was Queer	St. Martin's	Finalist	
2021	Eric Cervini	The Deviant's War: The Homosexual vs. the United States of America	Farrar, Straus and Giroux	Winner	
2021	John Birdsall	The Man Who Ate Too Much: The Life of James Beard	W. W. Norton	Finalist	
2021	Ross A. Slotten	Plague Years: A Doctor's Journey Through the AIDS Crisis	University of Chicago Press	Finalist	
2021	Wayne Koestenbaum	Figure It Out	Soft Skull Press	Finalist	
2022	Brian Broome	Punch Me Up to the Gods	Mariner	Winner	
2022	C. Winter Han	Racial Erotics: Gay Men of Color, Sexual Racism, and the Politics of Desire	University of Washington Press	Finalist	
2022	Jeremy Atherton Lin	Gay Bar: Why We Went Out	Little, Brown	Finalist	
2022	Rajiv Mohabir	Antiman: A Memoir	Restless Books	Finalist	
2023	Ron Goldberg	Boy with the Bullhorn: A Memoir and History of Act Up New York	Fordham University Press	Winner	
2023	Gregory D. Smithers	Reclaiming Two-Spirits: Sexuality, Spiritual Renewal and Sovereignty in Native America	Beacon Press	Finalist	
2023	Jenn Budd	Against the Wall: My Journey from Border Patrol Agent to Immigrant Rights Activist	Heliotrope	Finalist	
2023	Scott Bane	A Union Like Ours: The Love Story of F.O Matthiesen and Russell Cheney	University of Massachusetts	Finalist	
2024	Joseph Plaster	Kids on the Street: Queer Kinship and Religion in San Francisco's Tenderloin	Duke University Press	Winner	
2024	Gregory D. Smithers	Boyslut: A Memoir and Manifesto, by Zachary Zane (, an imprint of Abrams Books)	Abrams Image	Finalist	
2024	Greg Marshall	Leg: The Story of a Limb and the Boy Who Grew From It	Abrams Books	Finalist	
2024	Mark D. Jordan	Queer Callings: Untimely Notes on Names and Desires	Fordham University Press	Finalist	
2025	Lucy Hughes-Hallett	The Scapegoat	HarperCollins	Winner	
2025	Katherine Bucknell	Christopher Isherwood Inside-Out	Farrar, Straus and Giroux	Finalist	
2025	Will Tosh	Straight Acting: The Hidden Queer Lives of William Shakespeare	Seal Press	Finalist	
2025	Brontez Purnell	Ten Bridges I've Burnt	MCD	Finalist	
2026	Nicholas Boggs	Baldwin: A Love Story	Farrar, Straus and Giroux	Winner	
2026	Robert W. Fieseler	American Scare	Dutton	Finalist	
2026	Michael Schreiber	Don Bachardy: An Artist's Life	Citadel	Finalist	
2026	Daniel Brook	The Einstein of Sex	W. W. Norton	Finalist	
2026	Brandy Schillace	The Intermediaries	W. W. Norton	Finalist	
