= The Global Campaign for Equal Nationality Rights =

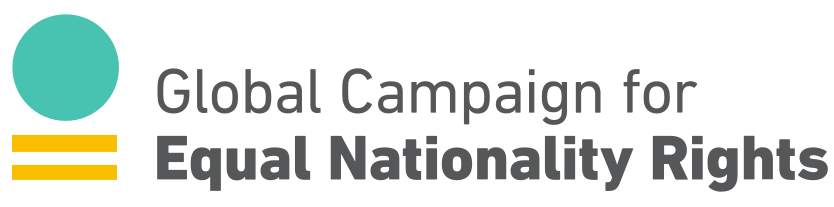
- Formation: 2014
- Type: NGO
- Headquarters: New York
- Campaign Manager: Catherine Harrington
- Website: equalnationalityrights.org

The Global Campaign for Equal Nationality Rights is a campaign mobilizes international action to end gender discrimination in nationality laws through local and international advocacy, activism, research, capacity building and knowledge sharing.

The Global Campaign for Equal Nationality Rights works on amending nationality laws in the 50+ countries that prevent women from conferring their nationality to non-national spouses; and to reform nationality laws in the 25 countries which deny mothers their right to confer their nationality to their children, on equal basis with fathers.

== Background and history ==
Prior to the launch of the campaign in 2014, efforts to remove gender discrimination laws were only recently undertaken at a national level.

== Founding Steering Committee and Coalition members ==
The Campaign's Founding Steering Committee include: the Institute on Statelessness and Inclusion, Equal Rights Trust, UNHCR, Equality Now, Women's Refugee Commission and Women's Learning Partnership. The Global Campaign Coalition members include NGOs, UN agencies, activists, academics, civil society organizations and government allies.

The Campaign is housed in New York by the Women's Refugee Commission.

== Campaign Activities ==
The Global Campaign for Equal Nationality Rights' core activities include local and international advocacy, capacity building and research and knowledge sharing. It collaborates with local and regional organizations to advocate for nationality law reform in target countries. The Campaign also mobilizes international actors, including UN actors, to take action to end gender discrimination in nationality laws.
