= Adolf Bayersdorfer =

German art historian and chess composer

Adolf Christian Bayersdorfer
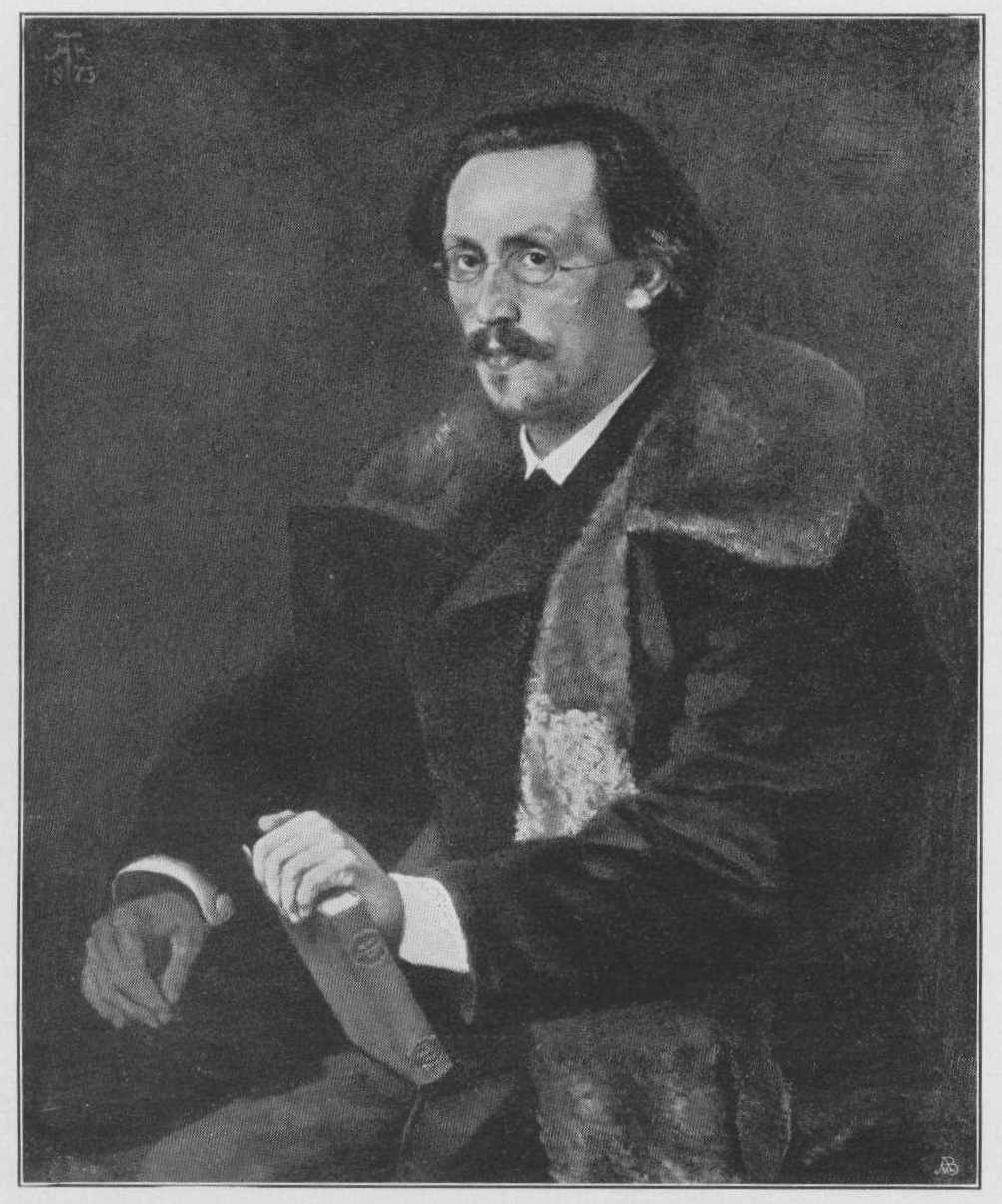
- Bayersdorfer portrait by Hans Thoma (1873)
- Born: 7 June 1842; Erlenbach am Main, Germany
- Died: 21 December 1901 (aged 59); Munich, Germany
- Occupations: art historian, chess composer

Adolf Christian Bayersdorfer (7 June 1842, in Erlenbach am Main – 21 December 1901, in Munich), was a German art historian and chess composer.

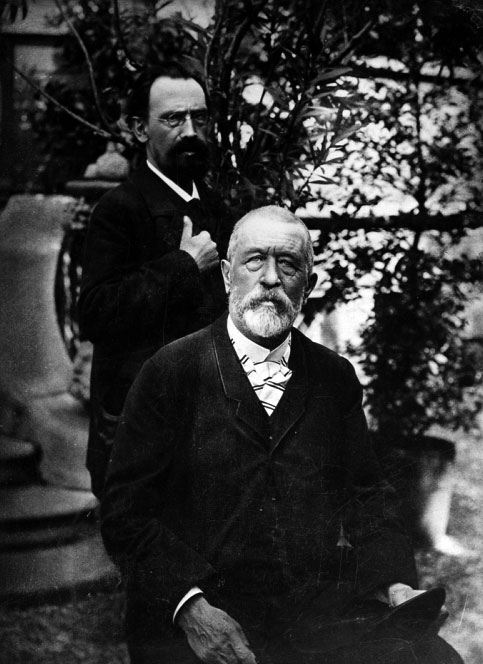
Adolf Bayersdorfer (standing) with Arnold Böcklin

Bayersdorfer, the son to a forester, moved with his mother to Munich after his father died in 1853. He married Jenny Pauly in 1880; they had three children. He died aged 59 from a heart condition.

== Art historian ==
From 1862 Bayersdorfer studied at the Wilhelmsgymnasium (a grammar school in Munich), and then philosophy and art history at university. From 1874, for six years, he studied the works of Italian painters while in Italy, mainly Venice, under the support of a state scholarship. He was a significant art historian from the 1870s to the 1890s who was involved in the 1871 congress on the Dresden Holbeinstreit (Dresden Holbein Controversy), a seminal event on two paintings attributed to Hans Holbein the Younger, which drove a more exact methodology on attribution. He wrote theatre and painting reviews for Viennese and Munich newspapers.

In 1880 Bayersdorfer was curator at the Alte Pinakothek and administrator of the Bavarian State Painting Collections in Munich, where he curated art work and wrote catalogues. He corresponded with significant painters of his time and was a close friend to Arnold Böcklin. In 1897 he received an honorary doctorate from the University of Leipzig. Bayersdorfer was one of the founders of the German Institute of Art History in Florence.

== Chess composition ==
In his spare time, Bayersdorfer composed chess problems. He headed the newspaper chess column in the Münchner Neueste Nachrichten from 1888 until his death. As a chess composer he was particularly fond of economy, effective key moves and pure mate pictures. He also worked on a systematisation of mate pictures and gave his name to two composition themes. A year after Bayersdorfer's death, Johannes Kohtz and Carl Kockelkorn published a book on Bayersdorfer's chess problems.

== Literature ==
- Von Reber, Franz; Bayersdorfer, Adolf; Klassischer Skulpturenschatz vols. 1 and 2, Bruckmann, Munich (1 January 1897)
- Mackowsky, Hans; Pauly, August; Weigand, Wilhelm; Adolf Bayersdorfers Leben und Schriften. Bruckmann, Munich (1902).
- Kohtz, Johannes; Kockelkorn, Carl (1902); Zur Kenntnis des Schachproblems. Kritiken und ausgewählte Aufgaben von A. Bayersdorfer (On the knowledge of the chess problem. Critiques and selected tasks by A. Bayersdorfer), A. Steins, Potsdam
- Hermann Uhde-Bernays (1953). "Bayersdorfer, Adolph". Neue Deutsche Biographie (in German). Vol. 1. Berlin: Duncker & Humblot. pp. 680–680. (full text online).
- Käss, Siegfried (1987); Der heimliche Kaiser der Kunst. Adolph Bayersdorfer, seine Freunde und seine Zeit (The secret emperor of art. Adolph Bayersdorfer, his friends and his time), Tuduv, Munich
