= Jamaican nationality law =

Jamaican Nationality Act

Parliament of Jamaica
- Long title: An act to provide for;acquisition, deprivation and renunciation of citizenship of Jamaica and for purposes incidental to or connected with the matters aforesaid
- Enacted by: Government of Jamaica
- Status: Current legislation

Jamaican nationality law is regulated by the 1962 Constitution of Jamaica, as amended; the Nationality Act of 1962, and its revisions; and various British Nationality laws. These laws determine who is, or is eligible to be, a national of Jamaica. Jamaican nationality is typically obtained either on the principle of jus soli, i.e. by birth in Jamaica; or under the rules of jus sanguinis, i.e. by birth abroad to parents with Jamaican nationality. It can also be granted to persons with an affiliation to the country, or to a permanent resident who has lived in the country for a given period of time through naturalisation. There is not currently a program in Jamaica for persons to acquire nationality through investment in the country. Nationality establishes one's international identity as a member of a sovereign nation. Though it is not synonymous with citizenship, for rights granted under domestic law for domestic purposes, the United Kingdom, and thus the commonwealth, have traditionally used the words interchangeably.

== Acquiring Jamaican nationality ==
Jamaican nationality is acquired through birth, registration, or naturalisation.

=== By birth ===
Birthright nationality applies to:

- Persons who are born within the territory, except if the parent has diplomatic immunity or is a national of a country at war with Jamaica;
- Persons who are born abroad to a parent or grandparent who is a Jamaican national; or
- Persons born upon aircraft or ships registered in Jamaica or unregistered aircraft or ships belonging to the government.

=== By registration ===
Nationality by registration includes those who have familial or historic relationship affiliations with Jamaica. Persons who acquire nationality by registration include:

- Persons who were the wife or widow of a national who acquired nationality at the time of independence, or would have acquired nationality except for the death of the spouse;
- Post-independence, the spouse of a national;
- Persons who were born abroad before or after 6 August 1962, to at least one parent who was a Jamaican national at the time of birth, or to Jamaican parents or grandparents who would have acquired such nationality had they not died prior to independence;
- Persons who are nationals of a Commonwealth country or the Republic of Ireland, who have become residents of Jamaica and resided in the territory or worked for the government for at least five years; or
- Minors under the age of majority who are legally adopted by a national at the issuance of an adoption order.

=== By naturalisation ===
Ordinary naturalisation in Jamaica can be obtained by adult persons of legal capacity, who in the 12 months prior to submitting an application resided in the territory, are of good character, and intend to be a resident of Jamaica. Applicants petition the Minister responsible for immigration, who considers whether the applicant has resided within the territory for seven years and poses no threat to national security or public order. Upon approval, applicants who are not nationals of a Commonwealth country must take an Oath of Allegiance.

== Loss of nationality ==
Nationals may voluntarily renounce their affiliation with Jamaica, if the declarant is a legal adult and is able to acquire other nationality, eliminating the prospect of statelessness within twelve months. Renunciation may not be accepted if Jamaica is at war with the proposed new source of nationality, or such renunciation would pose a threat to Jamaica. Denaturalisation may occur if a person obtained nationality through fraud, false representation, or concealment; if they have committed acts of treason; if they have committed acts of disloyalty or service to a foreign government; if they are found guilty of certain criminal offences; if they lose their nationality in a Commonwealth country; and if they take up residence abroad.

== Dual nationality ==
Dual nationality was provided for in the independence constitution for certain Commonwealth countries, if those countries permitted dual nationality. Outside of the Commonwealth nations, multiple nationality was forbidden.

== History ==
=== Spanish colonial period (1494–1670) ===
Jamaica was claimed by Spain in 1494 and in 1502 Christopher Columbus settled on the island for a year. Under the terms of the Siete Partidas (Seven-Part Code) enacted by Alfonso X of Castile in the 13th century, families were organized with a male head of household, who controlled the power, required obedience, and provided support and protection for those in the family unit. Married women were legally required to submit to their husband's authority to maintain family unity. The Code also introduced slavery to the Spanish realm, as well as a system of forced labor upon the indigenous population. Upon Columbus' death in 1506, his heirs sued the Spanish Crown to recover concessions granted to the explorer. In an effort to settle the matter, in 1527, the crown ceded the Island of Jamaica to Columbus' family, as their own personal property. Though private, the island was governed in the same fashion as other Spanish colonies and while the Columbus family were able to select governors and officials, the crown retained the authority to accept or reject appointments. The island operated as an outpost at the periphery of the Spanish possessions and became a clandestine trading station for the Dutch, French and English traders. In 1654, Oliver Cromwell, Lord Protector of the Commonwealth of England, Scotland and Ireland launched a massive attack upon the Spanish possessions in the Americas hoping to acquire the colonies for Britain. In 1655, Cromwell's army captured Jamaica and a ten-year battle for possession began, which was settled by the 1670 Treaty of Madrid, transferring the island to Britain.

=== British colonial period (1670–1962) ===
In Britain, allegiance, in which subjects pledged to support a monarch, was the precursor to the modern concept of nationality. The crown recognized from 1350 that all persons born within the territories of the British Empire were subjects. Those born outside the realm – except children of those serving in an official post abroad, children of the monarch, and children born on a British sailing vessel – were considered by common law to be foreigners. Marriage did not affect the status of a subject of the realm. Britain established a plantation model to organize society, highly dependent upon sugar, with white elites controlling economic and political power. Unlike other colonial powers with slave societies in the Caribbean, the British did not have an overarching single slave code. Each British colony was allowed to establish its own rules about the slave trade, and a code was established for Jamaica in 1664. Freed people of colour typically held second or third class positions in society and were distrusted by elites. Free-born people of colour typically had higher status in Jamaica and limited rights. Married women were subjugated to the authority of their husbands under coverture, and the law was structured to maintain social hierarchies by regulating familial matters like, who could marry, legitimacy, and inheritance. Children in slave societies followed the status of the mother, thus if she was free her children would be free or if she was in bondage, her children would also be bound.

Other than common law, there was no standard law which applied for subjects throughout the realm, meaning different jurisdictions created their own legislation for local conditions, which often conflicted with the laws in other jurisdictions in the empire. (Note: In 1733, the Jamaican legislature passed a law, unheard of in the other colonies of the British West Indies, decreeing that the great-great-great grandchildren of an African ancestor were legally white, if they were baptized as Christians. Cox and other sources indicate three degrees removed, but as historian Brooke N. Newman points out the statute said "the issue of a mustee woman", which is confirmed by anthropologist Jean Besson, who specifies legal whites were musteffino, i.e. the child of a mustee, grandchild of a quadroon, great-grandchild of a sambo, and great-great-grandchild of a mulatto.) Nationality laws passed by the British Parliament were extended only to the Kingdom of Great Britain, and later the United Kingdom of Great Britain and Ireland. In 1807, the British Parliament passed the Slave Trade Act, barring the Atlantic slave trade in the empire. The Act did not abolish slavery, which did not end until the 1833 Emancipation Act went into effect in 1834. Under its terms, slaves were converted into apprentices and remained bound to their former owners for four years if they had worked in the home and for six years if they had been field labourers. The apprentice system was abandoned in Jamaica in 1838. Though free, there was never a British plan to give former slaves a voice in Parliament, leaving them as British subjects in a highly stratified system of rights. Denied political and economic rights, former slaves were not entitled to formal recognition as nationals by other nations.

From 1863, the Colony of Jamaica included the Cayman Islands and from 1874, the Turks and Caicos Islands. Jamaica became a crown colony in 1866 and its administration and legislative authority were transferred to the crown. In 1911, at the Imperial Conference a decision was made to draft a common nationality code for use across the empire. The British Nationality and Status of Aliens Act 1914 allowed local jurisdictions in the self-governing Dominions to continue regulating nationality in their territories, but also established an imperial nationality scheme throughout the realm. The uniform law, which went into effect on 1 January 1915, required a married woman to derive her nationality from her spouse, meaning if he was British, she was also, and if he was foreign, so was she. It stipulated that upon loss of nationality of a husband, a wife could declare that she wished to remain British and provided that if a marriage had terminated, through death or divorce, a British-born national who had lost her status through marriage could reacquire British nationality through naturalisation without meeting a residency requirement. The statute reiterated common law provisions for natural-born persons born within the realm on or after the effective date. By using the word person, the statute nullified legitimacy requirements for jus soli nationals. For those born abroad on or after the effective date, legitimacy was still required, and could only be derived by a child from a British father (one generation), who was natural-born or naturalised. Naturalisations required five years residence or service to the crown.

Amendments to the British Nationality Act were enacted in 1918, 1922, 1933 and 1943 changing derivative nationality by descent and modifying slightly provisions for women to lose their nationality upon marriage. Because of a rise in statelessness, a woman who did not automatically acquire her husband's nationality upon marriage or upon his naturalisation in another country, did not lose her British status after 1933. The 1943 revision allowed a child born abroad at any time to be a British national by descent if the Secretary of State agreed to register the birth. Under the terms of the British Nationality Act 1948 British nationals in Jamaica were reclassified at that time as "Citizens of the UK and Colonies" (CUKC). The basic British nationality scheme did not change overmuch, and typically those who were previously defined as British remained the same. Changes included that wives and children no longer automatically acquired the status of the husband or father, children who acquired nationality by descent no longer were required to make a retention declaration, and registrations for children born abroad were extended.

Jamaica became part of the West Indies Federation in 1958. The federation, which included Barbados, the British Leeward Islands, the British Windward Islands, and Trinidad and Tobago, was typically seen by its supporters as a means to use a federal structure to gain national independence and eventual recognition as a Dominion. The federation was unable to develop a unified nationality scheme, as member states tended to identify with their specific island, rather than by region. In 1959 Jamaica was granted full internal self-governing authority and the Turks and Caicos was severed from the Colony of Jamaica. After holding an independence referendum in 1961, Jamaica withdrew from the federation. The Cayman Islands were separated from Jamaica in 1962 and Jamaica became fully independent.

=== Post-independence (1962–present) ===
Jamaican independence occurred on 6 August 1962. Generally, persons who had previously been nationals as defined under the classification of "Citizens of the UK and Colonies", would become nationals of Jamaica on Independence Day and ceased to be British nationals. However, automatic conferral was only given to CUKCs who were born in Jamaica or descended of a father or paternal grandfather, or if illegitimate a mother, who was born in Jamaica. Registered or naturalised persons, including wives who had formerly been registered, who had been CUKCs in Jamaica prior to independence were required to apply to be re-registered. Exceptions were made for persons to retain their British nationality and status if they (or their father or grandfather) were born, naturalised, or registered in a part of the realm which remained on 1 November part of the United Kingdom or colonies, or had been annexed by such a place. Other exceptions included that women who were married to CUKCs did not lose their British status at independence, unless their husbands did. Subsequently, Jamaica passed the Nationality Act of 1962 and the Law Reform Age of Majority Act in 1979.

In 1976, the Status of Children Act amended provisions regarding illegitimacy in Jamaican jurisprudence; however it did not eliminate the inability of unwed fathers to pass their nationality to their children or for children to derive their nationality from married mothers. From 1988, proposals were pending in the Jamaican legislature to amend the Nationality Act to eliminate gender disparities. When the amendment passed in 1993, the changes allowed either parent to pass on nationality to their children and granted husbands of Jamaican women the ability to derive their wife's nationality.
