= Stephen J. Blackwood =

Canadian American academic administrator

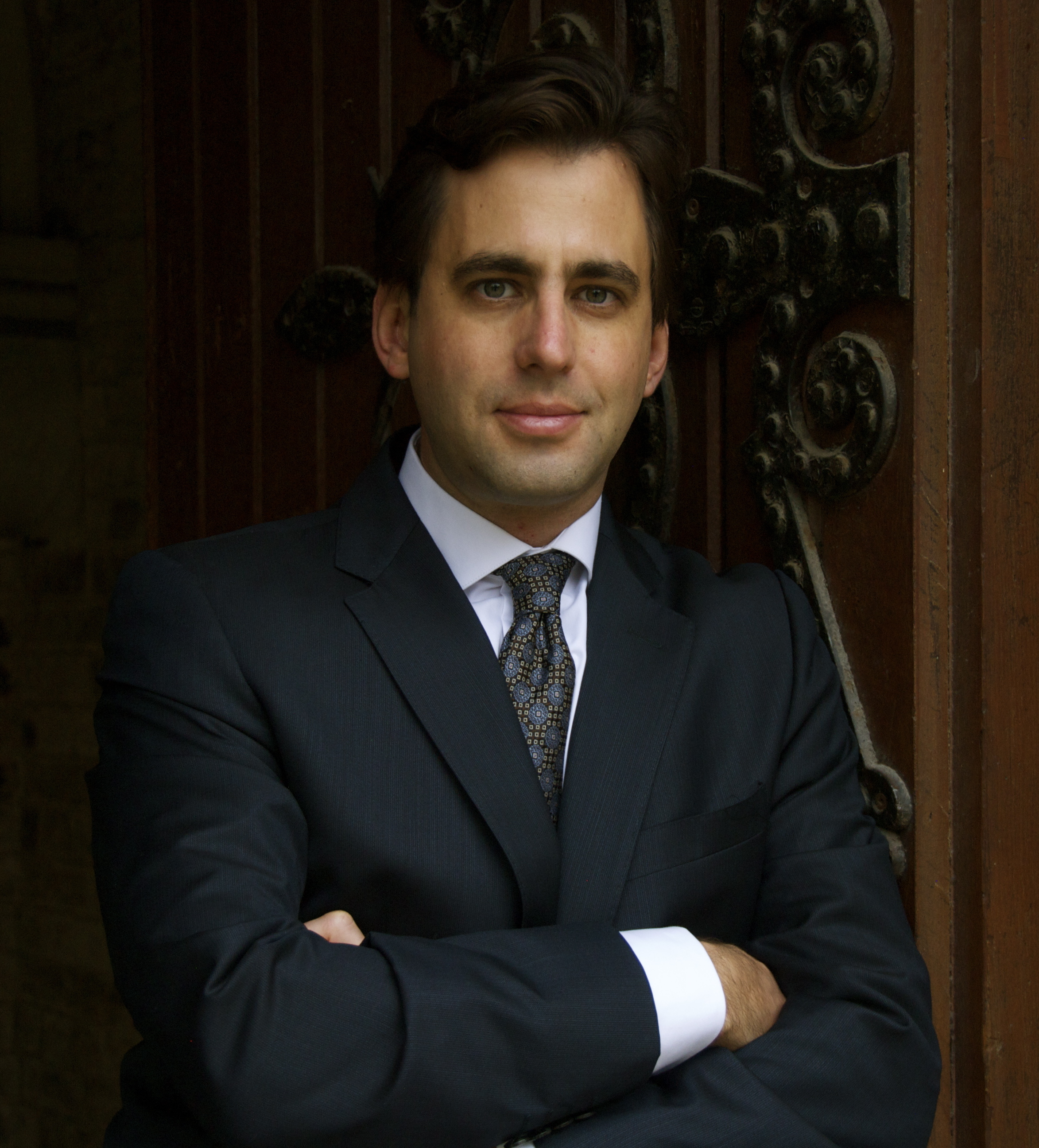
- Blackwood in 2012
- Born: 1975 (age 50–51); Alberta, Canada
- Occupations: Professor, activist

Academic background
- Education: University of King's College (BA); Dalhousie University (MA); Emory University (PhD)
- Thesis: The Meters of Boethius: Rhythmic Therapy in the Consolation of Philosophy (2010)
- Doctoral advisor: Mark D. Jordan

Academic work
- Institutions: University of King's College; Ralston College
- Website: stephenjblackwood.com

Stephen James Blackwood (born 1975) is a Canadian-American professor, academic, and social commentator.

Blackwood is the founder and president of Ralston College, a private unaccredited liberal arts college in Savannah, Georgia.

== Early life and education ==
Blackwood was born in Alberta, Canada, and grew up in Prince Edward Island as the eldest of ten children. He received a B.A. from the University of King's College and an M.A. from Dalhousie University. Blackwood earned his PhD in religion from Emory University in 2010, with Mark D. Jordan as his doctoral advisor.

== Career ==
Blackwood lectures and writes on the intellectual and cultural development of the West, and specializes in the history of philosophy, especially Boethius. Oxford University Press published his book The Consolation of Boethius as Poetic Liturgy in 2015.

Blackwood was a founding executive director of St George's YouthNet, an educational mentoring program for inner-city youth in the North End district of Halifax, Nova Scotia. He was subsequently a teaching fellow in the Foundation Year Programme at the University of King's College. He sits on the Board of the Neuroendocrine Tumor Research Foundation.

He has argued in defense of the integrity of the private sphere and in opposition to Obamacare. His op-ed in the Wall Street Journal about his mother's loss of her cancer coverage as a consequence of the Affordable Care Act was read on the floor of the US Senate and entered into the Congressional Record.

Blackwood was the host and moderator of a conversation between Jordan Peterson and Sir Roger Scruton at Cambridge University on November 2, 2018. He also moderated a debate called “Happiness: Capitalism vs. Marxism” between Slavoj Žižek and Peterson on April 19, 2019.

=== Ralston College ===
Blackwood founded Ralston College in 2010 as a non-profit liberal arts college and serves as its president. Ralston College began its first classes in 2022 for graduate students, though the college remains unaccredited.
