= Ludwig Speidel =

German writer (1830–1906)

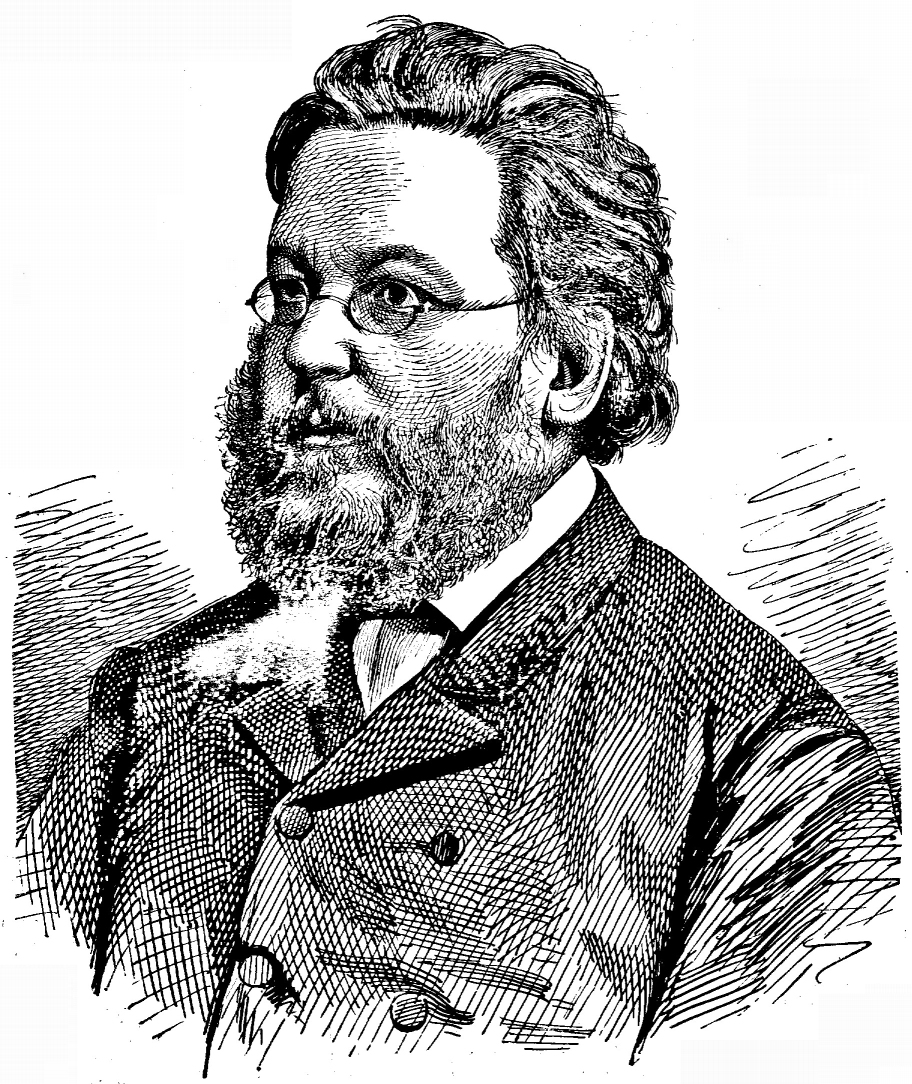
Ludwig Speidel, ca. 1900

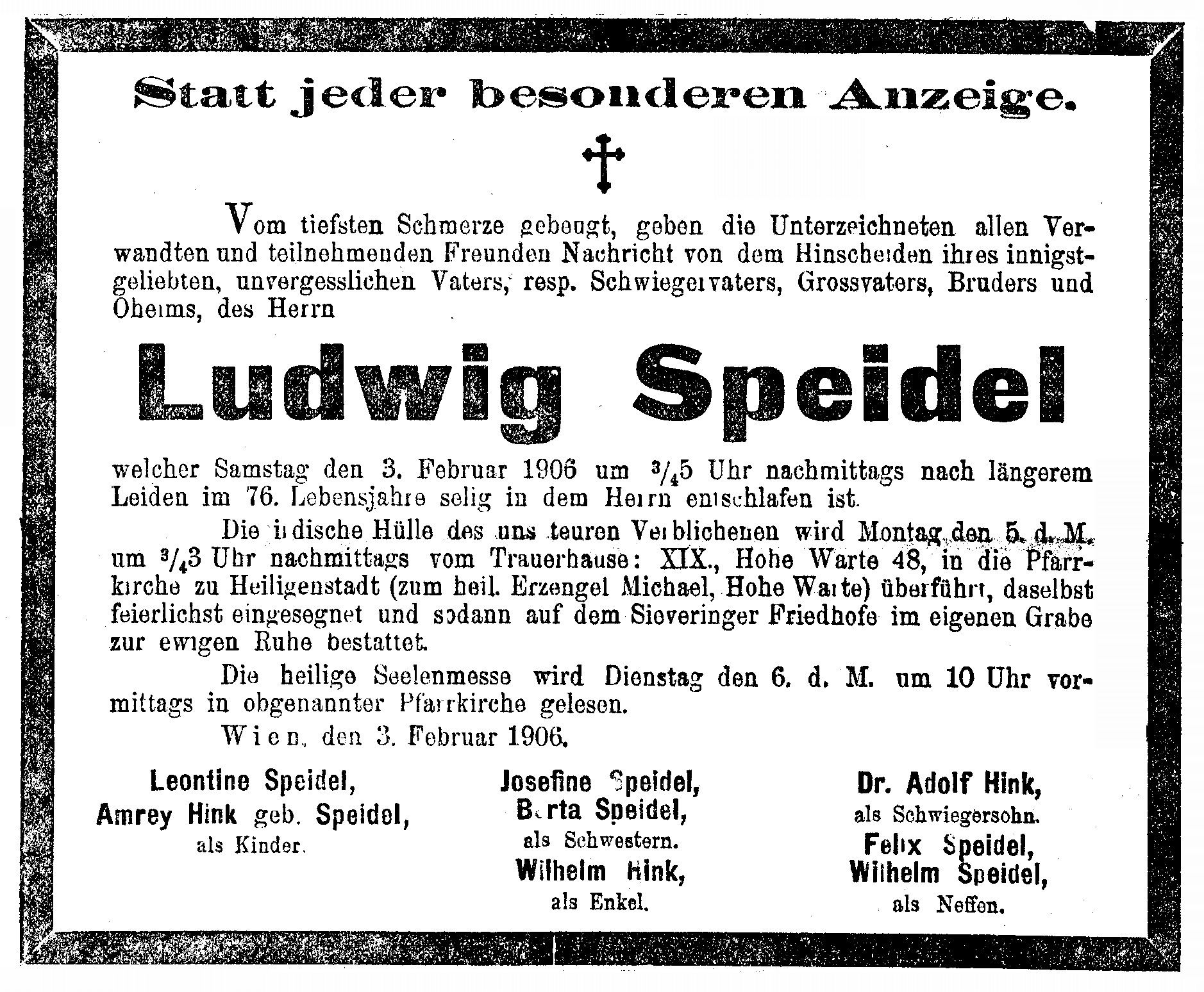
Death announcement in the NFP

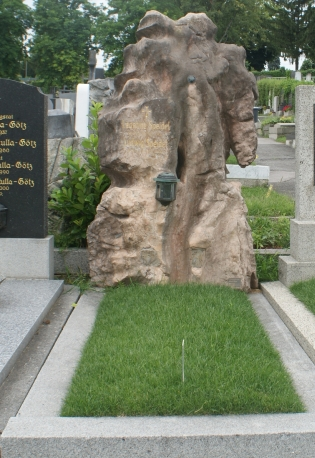
Grave of Ludwig Speidel

Ludwig Speidel (11 April 1830 – 3 February 1906) was a German writer, which in the second half of the 19th century was the leading music, theater and literary critic in Vienna.

== Life ==
Born in Ulm, Speidel received first musical lessons from his father, singer and composer Konrad Speidel (born 16 September 1804 in Söflingen bei Ulm; died 6 January 1880 in Ulm; married to Anna Steiner) and attended the Gymnasium in Ulm. From 1850 until 1853, he studied different subjects only as a guest student at the Ludwig-Maximilians-Universität München due to lack of financial means. Besides, he gave piano lessons and from 1852 he wrote reviews for the Augsburger Allgemeine; his first ('Musikalisches aus München') was published on October 28. Among his circle of acquaintances in Munich were Friedrich Kaulbach, Ernst Förster, Jakob Philipp Fallmerayer, Justus von Liebig, Ludwig Steub and Adolf Bayersdorfer.

In 1853, Speidel came to Vienna, allegedly to report on the marriage of Empress Elisabeth of Austria to Franz Joseph I. He became friends with Carl Rahl and remained in Vienna, where he subsequently worked for numerous newspapers and magazines, including Pester Lloyd (1854), the Danube (1855-1863), the Österreichische Zeitung (1855-1858), the Jagdzeitung and the Morgenpost (1858), the Neuste Nachrichten (1859) and the Wiener Zeitung (1858/59). He wrote about many topics: Theatre, music, art, chats, humoresques, travel letters, genre pictures among others 1860-1864 he worked for the newspaper Vaterlan. With the foundation of Neuen Freie Presse in 1864, Speidel became its first feature editor for four decades. Around the same time, he was also the music critic of the Fremden-Blatt. While he wrote for the Presse rather in a chosen language, he used a very popular way of expression in the Fremden-Blatt, which could remind one of joke magazines.

He only drew his articles with his full name in very special cases, otherwise only with the soon known abbreviation "L. Sp.", in the Fremden-Blatt. In addition, he used numerous other ciphers: "§" (also as art consultant of the Neue Freie Presse) in the (Wiener Zeitung), "-l", "□", "X", "*" among others.

Speidel became the most important Viennese critic and feature writer of his time and was known and befriended with many of the greats of Viennese music and theatre life of his time, among others Josef Bayer, Ludwig Bösendorfer, Johann von Herbeck, Martin Greif, Ludwig Hevesi, Max Kalbeck, Martin Gustav Nottebohm, Ludwig Porges, Johann Vesque von Püttlingen and Hugo Wittmann. He was one of the first to recognise the importance of Johann Nestroy, Adalbert Stifter and Anton Bruckner and paid tribute to the operettas of Johann Strauss II. He had a very negative attitude towards the works of Richard Wagner, which often brought him into sharp contrast with his admirers. Speidel was highly regarded as a theatre critic, in 1887 he was even offered the direction of the Burgtheater, but he refused.

About his own work, he once said: "I have never proofread a work and never looked at a printed feuilleton again." His wife Leontine (née Ziegelmayer; † 6 January 1903) collected the newspaper clippings which later formed the basis of his collected works published in 1910.

His brother was the composer Wilhelm Speidel (1826-1899)

Speidel died in Vienna at the age of 75. He is buried in a grave dedicated to him in the Sieveringer Friedhof.

== Quotes ==
The source of these quotations is Ludwig Hevesis' article Ludwig Speidel, Writer in Biographischen Jahrbuch und deutscher Nekrolog (1906).

- "Das Feuilleton ist die Unsterblichkeit eines Tages.“
- A propos Ludwig Anzengruber: "As long as Anzengruber wrote, no other German poet has put more solid content into dramatic forms."
- A propos Johannes Brahms: "An excellent composer, one of the brightest lights of contemporary German music ...", but also "... a far too worldly-wise, ironic nature, which looks far too deeply into people to care about their current applause."
- Speaking of Anton Bruckner: "Mesner figure with the emperor's skull"
- A propos Grillparzer's Ein Bruderzwist in Habsburg: "One of the poets seems so fairy-tale like an enchanted Habsburg prince, condemned by day to be the archives director of the Court Chamber and at night writing down memories of his glorious past".
- A propos Hans Makart: "Where this youthful talent is headed, the gods know. It is to be feared, unfortunately, that it will lose itself in empty virtuosity.
- A propos Carl Rahl: "For the first time since Schubert, Vienna has again produced a great creative artist, but one treats him as if the geniuses in this country were like thistles' heads."
- A propos Ferdinand Raimund: "If there was a poet in Vienna, it was Raimund."
- A propos Franz Schubert: "The greatest symphonist after Beethoven".
- A propos Richard Wagner: "Wagner's music, on the other hand, is thoroughly external, sensual in the bad sense of the word, homely, briefly un-German ..."
  "Wagner is artistically not the expression of the German spirit, but only a distortion of it [...] he is an inwardly unproductive, an artificial, hollow, reflected nature ..."
  Later, Speidel's attitude to Wagner softened and he wrote
  "Apart from the values or unvalues of Wagner's music, it has one positive characteristic. The positive thing about it is that it arouses enthusiasm".
- A propos Ferdinand Georg Waldmüller: "Waldmüller's artistic heyday was short, hardly filling a decade. His best works fall into the 1940s and, just as he had not really wanted to succeed until then, his career rapidly went downhill from 1848 onwards."

== Work ==
Independent publications during his lifetime

- Rahl’s athenischer Fries. Erläutert von Ludwig Speidel. Österreichischer Kunstverein, Vienna 1867.
- Bilder aus der Schillerzeit. Mit ungedruckten Briefen an Schiller. Edited by Ludwig Speidel and Hugo Wittmann. Spemann, Berlin 1884.
- Das Wiener Theater. In Die österreichisch-ungarische Monarchie in Wort und Bild (volume 3). K.-k. Hof- u. Staatsdruckerei, Vienna 1887.
- Theater. In Wien 1848–1888. Denkschrift zum 2. December 1888. Edited by the City Council of Vienna, 1888.
- Auf der Höhe. Zur Erinnerung an Wilhelm Schenner. O. V., o. O 1891.
- Kleine Schriften von Heinrich Natter. With a foreword by Ludwig Speidel. Edlinger, Innsbruck 1893.
- Ludwig Eisenberg: Adolf von Sonnenthal. Eine Künstlerlaufbahn als Beitrag zur modernen Burgtheater-Geschichte. With a foreword by Ludwig Speidel. . E. Pierson, Dresden 1896.

Posthume Buchveröffentlichungen

- Ludwig Speidels Schriften.
  - Vol. 1: Persönlichkeiten. Biographisch-literarische Essays. Meyer & Jessen, Berlin 1910.
    Online
  - Vol 2: Wiener Frauen und anderes Wienerische. Meyer & Jessen, Berlin 1910.
  - Vol 3. Heilige Zeiten. Weihnachtsblätter. Meyer & Jessen, Berlin 1911.
    Online
  - Vol 4. Schauspieler. Meyer & Jessen, Berlin 1910.
    Online
- Melodie der Landschaft. Essays. Selected and introduced by Eduard Frank. Volk- und Reich-Verlag, Prag/Wien 1943.
- Kritische Schriften. Selected, introduced and explained by Julius Rütsch. Artemis, Zürich 1963.
- Fanny Elßlers Fuß. Wiener Feuilletons. Edited by Joachim Schreck. Böhlau, Vienna 1989, ISBN 3-205-05221-8 (Österreichische Bibliothek; vol. 11) und Volk und Welt, Berlin 1989, ISBN 3-353-00542-0.
