= Lajos Hevesi =

Hungarian journalist and writer

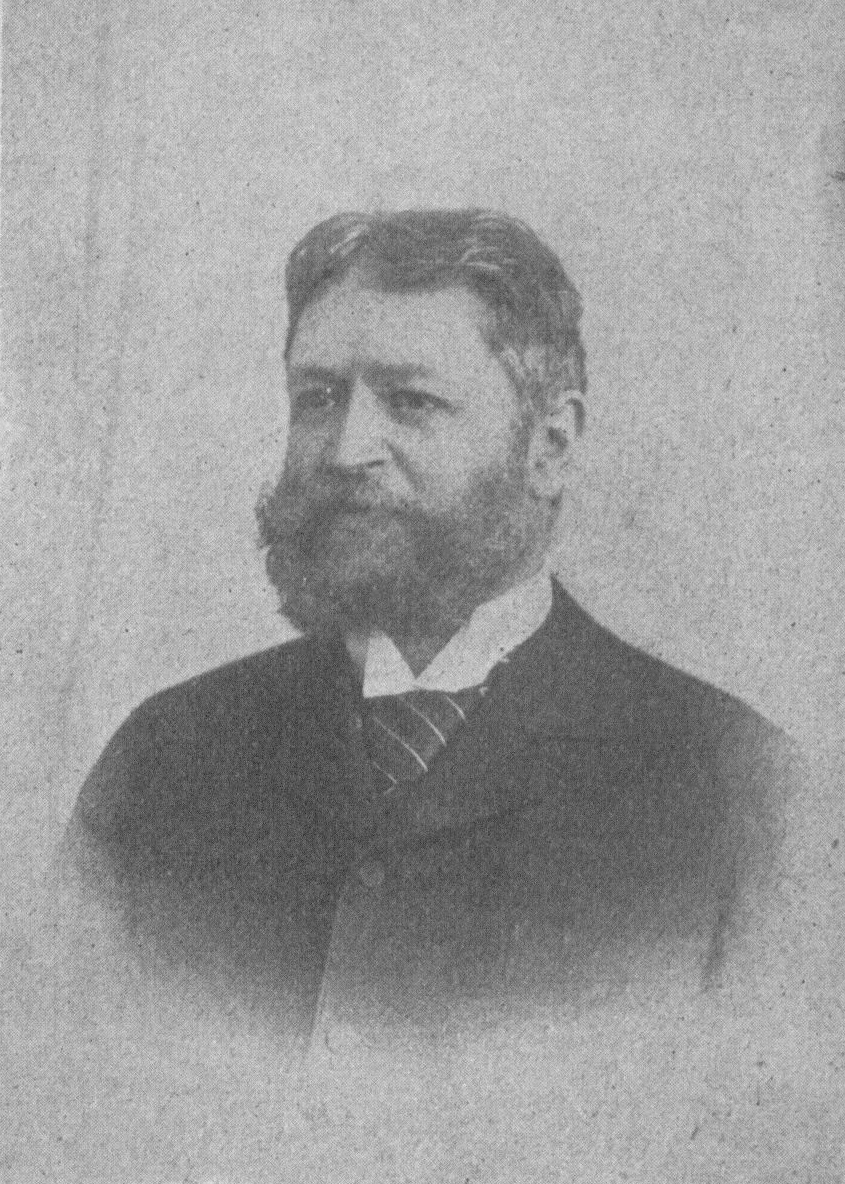
Ludwig Hevesi, photographer: Josef Löwy, ca. 1902

Lőwy Hevesi Lajos, or Ludwig Hevesi (December 20, 1843, Heves, Hungary – February 17, 1910, Vienna) was a Hungarian journalist and writer.

He studied medicine and classical philology in Budapest and Vienna, but soon turned to writing, and as of 1865 he was an active journalist and author. In 1866, he became engaged as a contributor to the "Pester Lloyd", and later to the "Breslauer Zeitung", for which publications he wrote humorous feuilletons. In 1875, Hevesi settled in Vienna and became the associate editor for the art department of the Wiener Fremden-Blatt. He also wrote dramatic criticisms on the performances in the Hofburgtheater. During 1871-74 he edited "Kleine Leute", a journal for the young. The first 7 volumes of the journal originated exclusively from his pen. In conjunction with a few friends he founded the Hungarian humor publication "Borsszem Jankó", which soon became a popular journal.

Hevesi committed suicide in 1910.

== Works ==
- A kereskedelmi levelezésnek kézikönyve. Pest 1864. [A manual of commercial correspondence]
- Sie sollen ihn nicht haben: Heiteres aus ernster Zeit. Köhler, Leipzig 1871 (Humor)
- Kleine Leute: Illustrirte Kinderzeitung. Budapest 1871/74. (7 vols.)
- Jelky András: bajai fiú rendkivüli kalandjai ötödfél világrészben. Pest 1872. New translated by Jószef Takách: Die Abenteuer des András Jelky in drei Erdteilen. New edition by János Czibor based on 3rd ed. 1879. Corvina, Budapest 1961. (several editions.).
- Budapest und seine Umgebung. Ráth, Budapest 1873. Hungarian ed.: Budapest és környéke. Budapest 1873
- Des Schneidergesellen Andreas Jelky Abenteuer in vier Welttheilen. Nach historischen Quellen zum ersten Male ausführlich dargestellt und der reiferen Jugend gewidmet von Onkel Tom. Redakteur der "Kleinen Leute". Mit sechs Holzschnitten nach Zeichnungen von Johann Greguß. Franklin-Verein, Budapest 1875.
- Karczképek az ország fővárosából. Budapest 1876. [Sketches from the Capital]
- Auf der Schneide: Ein Geschichtenbuch. Bonz, Stuttgart 1884
- Neues Geschichtenbuch. Bonz, Stuttgart 1885
- Auf der Sonnenseite: Ein Geschichtenbuch. Bonz, Stuttgart 1886. Microfiche ed.: Belser, Wildberg 1989/90, ISBN 3-628-40726-5
- Almanaccando: Bilder aus Italien. Bonz, Stuttgart 1888
- Buch der Laune: Neue Geschichten. Bonz, Stuttgart 1889
- Ein englischer September: Heitere Fahrten jenseits des Kanals. Bonz, Stuttgart 1891
- Regenbogen: Sieben heitere Geschichten. Ill. Wilhelm Schulz. Bonz, Stuttgart 1892
- Von Kalau bis Säkkingen: Ein gemütliches Kreuz und Quer Bonz, Stuttgart 1893
- Tübingen: Eine Reiseskizze. 1893
- Zerline Gabillon: Ein Künstlerleben. Ill. 18 drawings by Helene Bettelheim-Gabillon. Bonz, Stuttgart 1894
- Glückliche Reisen. Bonz, Stuttgart 1895
- Wilhelm Junker: Lebensbild eines Afrikaforschers. Weidmann, Berlin 1896
- Victor Tilgners ausgewählte Werke. Wien 1897
- Die Althofleute: Ein Sommerroman. Ill. by Wilhelm Schulz. Bonz, Stuttgart, 1897
- Blaue Fernen: Neue Reisebilder. Bonz, Stuttgart 1897
- Das bunte Buch: Humoresken aus Zeit und Leben, Litteratur und Kunst. Bonz, Stuttgart 1898
- Wiener Totentanz: Gelegentliches über verstorbene Künstler und ihresgleichen. Bonz, Stuttgart 1899. New ed.: Innsbruck, Univ. 2007, ISBN 3-226-00352-6
- Ideen. Olbrich Josef M.; Einf. von Ludvig Hevesi. Wien [1899]
- Der zerbrochene Franz nebst anderen Humoresken und Geschichten. Bonz, Stuttgart 1900
- Mac Eck's sonderbare Reisen zwischen Konstantinopel und San Francisco. Bonz, Stuttgart 1901
- Österreichische Kunst im 19. Jahrhundert. Seemann, Leipzig 1903. 1. T.: 1800-1848. 2. T.: 1848-1900
- Ewige Stadt, ewiges Land: Frohe Fahrt in Italien. Bonz, Stuttgart 1903
- Sonne Homers: Heitere Fahrten durch Griechenland und Sizilien 1802-1904. Bonz, Stuttgart 1905
- Rudolf von Alt: Variationen. Konegen, Wien 1905
- Schiller - Lenau: – Zwei Concordia-Reden. Konegen, Wien 1905
- Die fünfte Dimension: Humore der Zeit, des Lebens, der Kunst. Konegen, Wien 1906
- 8 Jahre Secession: (March 1897 - June 1905); Kritik - Polemik – Chronik. Konegen, Vienna 1906. Reprint: Wiederhrsg. u. eingeleitet von Otto Breicha. Ritter, Klagenfurt 1984, ISBN 3-85415-023-7
- Der Zug um den Mund. Bonz, Stuttgart 1907
- Gut munkeln: Neue Humore der neuen Zeit. Bonz, Stuttgart 1909
- Altkunst - Neukunst: Wien 1894 - 1908. Konegen, Vienna 1909. Reprint: Wiederhrsg. u. eingeleitet von Otto Breicha. Ritter, Klagenfurt 1986, ISBN 3-85415-034-2
- Flagranti und andere Heiterkeiten Bonz, Stuttgart 1910. Nee ed.: Metroverlag, Vienna 2009, ISBN 3-902517-97-2
- Ludwig Speidel: eine literarisch-biographische Würdigung. Meyer & Jessen, Berlin 1910
- Rudolf von Alt: Sein Leben und sein Werk. Nach dem hinterlassenen Manuskripte für den Druck vorbereitet von Karl M. Kuzmany. Edited by k.k. Ministerium für Kultus und Unterricht. Mit 61 Tafeln und 100 Textbildern. Artaria, Vienna 1911
- Das grosse Keinmalkeins. Edited by Gunther Martin. Zsolnay, Vienna, Darmstadt 1990, ISBN 3-552-04203-2

=== Translations into German ===
- Árpád Berczik: Mütter und Töchter, Lustspiel in drei Aufzügen. Bonz, Stuttgart 1893 (Theater play)
- Hungarian volumes of the edition: Az Osztrák-Magyar Monarchia írásban és képben. Hungarian translation of original edition in German: Die österreichisch-ungarische Monarchie in Wort und Bild. Vol. 5, 9, 12, 16, 18, 21, 23. 1888-1902
