= Joseph Plaster =

Queer historian and public humanities scholar

Joseph Plaster is an American historian and public humanities scholar whose work focuses on queer history, oral history, and urban studies. He is a Senior Lecturer in the Program in Museums and Society and Director of the Winston Tabb Special Collections Research Center at Johns Hopkins University. He was an affiliated faculty member of the Johns Hopkins University Alexander Grass Humanities Institute and served on the advisory board of OutHistory. He was the 2026-27 Scholar in Residence at Columbia University's Oral History Masters of Arts program.

== Education ==
Plaster earned a PhD in American Studies from Yale University in 2018.

== Publications ==
Plaster is author of Kids on the Street: Queer Kinship and Religion in San Francisco's Tenderloin, which received the 2024 Joe William Trotter Jr. Book Prize for Best First Book in Urban History, presented by the Urban History Association, the 2024 Oral History Association Book Award, and the 2024 Randy Shilts Award, presented by The Publishing Triangle.

Kids on the Street examines the informal support networks developed by queer and trans street youth in San Francisco's Tenderloin district from the 1950s to the 2010s. Drawing on archival sources, oral histories, and public humanities methods, Plaster explores how these networks functioned as systems of mutual aid and kinship. The book also critiques urban redevelopment and examines how such changes affected marginalized communities in the Tenderloin.

Plaster is author of Vanguard: A Queer History of Mutual Aid. The book traces the emergence and impact of Vanguard, a street-based activist organization forged in mid-1960s San Francisco by an unlikely coalition of sex workers, street queens, urban ministers, young adults, and War on Poverty reformers.

Plaster's article, "'Homosexuals in Adolescent Rebellion:' Central City Uprisings during the Long Sixties," published in GLQ: A Journal of Lesbian and Gay Studies in April 2023, received an honorable mention for the 2024 Audre Lorde Prize for outstanding work in LGBTQ history. Additional essays include "Safe for Whom? And Whose Families?" (The Public Historian, August 2020) and "Imagined Conversations and Activist Lineages" (Radical History Review, May 2012).

== Public Humanities ==
Plaster has directed several public humanities projects focused on oral history, queer history, and community collaboration.

Plaster directed the Peabody Ballroom Experience, a collaboration between Johns Hopkins University and Baltimore's ballroom community involving oral histories, archival research, teaching, documentary film, and public programming. The project won the National Council on Public History's 2023 Outstanding Project Award.

At Johns Hopkins, Plaster directs the Winston Tabb Special Collections Research Center, where he oversees archival collections, research services, and public humanities initiatives.

From 2017 to 2018, he led the San Francisco ACT UP Oral History Project, which documented the AIDS direct action movement through recorded interviews, a museum exhibition, and a digital archive. The oral history recordings include an oral history with Crystal Mason, an African American AIDS activist of color who worked with the direct-action group ACT UP/San Francisco in the early 1990s.

From 2010 to 2011, Plaster directed Vanguard Revisited, a public history project through which homeless LGBTQ youth documented and interpreted the legacy of 1960s street youth organizing. The project involved collaborations with youth to interpret the history of 1960s street-youth organizing through oral history, performance, and public programming. The Vanguard Revisited zine is archived by the Digital Transgender Archive.

From 2007 to 2009, Plaster directed Polk Street: Lives in Transition, a public history project focused on gentrification and public safety on San Francisco's Polk Street. Outcomes included a multimedia exhibit; neighborhood dialogues; oral history "listening parties;" and an hour-long radio documentary distributed nationally via NPR. The project was awarded the Allan Bérubé Prize for outstanding work in public GLBT history in 2010.
