= Mark Matousek =

American journalist

- Born: February 5, 1957 (age 69); Los Angeles, California
- Occupations: Author; journalist; teacher
- Website: markmatousek.com

Mark Matousek (born February 5, 1957) is an American memoirist, teacher, and journalist.

== Early years ==
Matousek was born in Los Angeles, California. His father James Matousek disappeared when he was four, leaving his mother in dire straits; his sister Marcia committed suicide in 1978. He earned a Bachelor of Arts degree in dramatic art from the University of California, Berkeley, in 1978 (Phi Beta Kappa, summa cum laude), a fellowship to Worcester College, Oxford in 1979, and a master's degree in English literature from UCLA in 1981.

== Journalism ==
In 1981 Matousek moved to New York City, working as a stringer covering popular culture for Reuters, then in the letters department of Newsweek magazine. He was hired by Andy Warhol's Interview in 1982, first as a proofreader then as the magazine's first senior editor. Over the next three years, Matousek conducted hundreds of interviews with prominent figures in film, television, books, fine art, politics, design, and science. Alarmed by the deaths of friends from AIDS, he quit his job in 1985 and spent the next years as an itinerant dharma bum and freelance journalist, living in Europe, India, and the United States.

Drawn to eastern philosophy, especially Buddhism, Matousek shifted gears from pop culture to psychology, religion, and spiritual seeking, and became a contributing editor to Common Boundary Magazine, where his back page column, The Naked Eye, appeared from 1994 to 1999. Subsequently, he received a National Magazine Award nomination for "America's Darkest Secret" (about the epidemic of incest in the U.S.) and published essays in numerous magazines, including The New Yorker, Details, O: The Oprah Magazine, Tricycle, The Utne Reader, AARP: The Magazine, Out, Good Housekeeping, Yoga Journal, McCalls, and Harper's Bazaar. His Ethical Wisdom blog appears regularly in The Huffington Post and Psychology Today online.

== Books ==
After working on The Tibetan Book of Living and Dying, Matousek collaborated with writer Andrew Harvey on Dialogues With A Modern Mystic (1994), later interviewing Harvey for a British documentary of the same name. His next book, Sex Death Enlightenment: A True Story (1996) became an international bestseller published in 10 countries and nominated for two Books for a Better Life Awards. In 2000 he published The Boy He Left Behind: A Man's Search for His Lost Father (Los Angeles Times Discovery Book, Randy Shilts Award, excerpted in The Observer) and served as co-editor on Ram Dass's book Still Here." When You're Falling, Dive: Lessons in the Art of Living appeared in 2008, and included autobiographical essays on writers including Joan Didion, Stanley Kunitz, Andrew Solomon, and James Hillman, as well as spiritual leaders Matthew Fox, Byron Katie, Eckhart Tolle et al. In 2011 Matousek published Ethical Wisdom: What Makes Us Good, a study of human morality. In 2017 he published two books: Mother of the Unseen World, an account of his experiences with the spiritual teacher Mother Meera, and Writing to Awaken, an in-depth guide to his Writing to Awaken method of self-discovery. In his most recent book, Lessons from an American Stoic: How Emerson Can Change Your Life (2023), Matousek shares his long-standing admiration for the American philosopher and explains how Emerson's timeless wisdom is relevant today.

His essays have appeared in numerous international anthologies, including: Voices of the Millenium, Wrestling With the Angel, A Memory, a Monologue, a Rant and a Prayer, Oprah's Best Life, and Be the Change.

== Social activism and teaching ==
In 2009 Matousek became creative director of V-Men, the male arm of playwright Eve Ensler's organization for ending violence against women and girls (V-Day), and curator of their online essay series (www.vday.com). His autobiographical essay "Rescue" (included in A Memory, a Monologue, a Rant, and a Prayer) has been performed internationally. He moderated the men's panel at the New Orleans Superdome for V to the Tenth in 2008. Matousek is currently working on a theatrical piece called Breaking Out the Man Box (with playwright James Lecesne), which will serve as V-Men's artistic vehicle (as Ensler's "The Vagina Monologues" launched V-Day). A popular writing instructor, he has taught memoir at Manhattanville College in Purchase, New York, as well as the Omega Institute in Rhinebeck, and The New York Open Center. Matousek is a member of PEN International and a core faculty member of Old Stone Farm, a wellness center in Staatsburg, New York.

== Bibliography ==
=== Books ===
- 1994 Dialogues With a Modern Mystic (with Andrew Harvey)
- 1996 Sex Death Enlightenment: A True Story
- 2000 The Boy He Left Behind: A Man's Search for His Lost Father
- 2008 When You're Falling, Dive: Lessons in the Art of Living
- 2011 Ethical Wisdom: What Makes Us Good
- 2017 Mother of thé Unseen World
- 2017 Writing to Awaken
- 2023 Lessons from an American Stoic: How Emerson Can Change Your Life

=== Articles ===
- The Dalai Lama's Secret: What Makes Us Good? The Huffington Post
- Life Lessons from Peter Pan The Huffington Post
- Andy Warhol Creeped Me Out "Over 50"
- Moral Decision Making "The Huffington Post"
- You Don't Need God to Be Good "The Huffington Post"
- Two Minute Memoir "Psychology Today"
- How Empathy is Born "Psychology Today"
- The Alchemy of Crisis "Beliefnet"
- The Game of Run and Seek "Beliefnet"
- How to Choose Happiness "Oprah.com"
- Ethical Wisdom "Tricycle"
- Getting of Wisdom "Mark Matousek"

=== Audio ===
- Ethical Wisdom: What Makes Us Good? "Audible
- The Earthquake Leonard Lopate Show
- Exceptional Wisdom Radio Exceptional Wisdom Radio

=== Video ===
- Are We Born Good? "Are we Born Good?"
- ABC Local "ABC Local"
- Mark Matousek at the Open Center on YouTube
- Healthy Remorse on YouTube
- Who is America's Greatest Spiritual Teacher on YouTube
