= The Crown's Silence =

Book by historian Brooke N. Newman

- Author: Brooke N. Newman
- Language: English
- Genre: History
- Publisher: Mariner Books, HarperCollins
- Publication date: 27 January 2026
- Pages: 464
- ISBN: 9780063290976
- Website: https://www.brookennewman.com/the-crowns-silence

The Crown's Silence, subtitled The Hidden History of Slavery and the British Monarchy in the United Kingdom and The Hidden History of the British Monarchy and Slavery in the Americas in the United States, is a book by historian Brooke N. Newman that explores how the British monarchy protected and participated in the Trans-Atlantic slave trade. It was published on 27 January 2026 in the U.S. and on 29 January 2026 in the UK.

== Content ==
Newman began research for the book approximately ten years before it was published, having discovered "secret correspondence" detailing George IV's fears of a Haitian Revolution-style uprising in Jamaica while conducting research for an earlier work on the Caribbean island. Drawing on royal archives and manuscripts relating to the Royal Navy, colonial officers, government officials, the Royal African Company, and the South Sea Company, Newman challenges Britain's long-held self-image as an abolitionist nation by documenting The Crown's direct, sustained, and financially motivated involvement in the transatlantic slave trade from the reign of Elizabeth I through the early nineteenth century. Newman writes that the British monarchy was not a passive bystander to slavery but an active and willing participant that invested in slave-trading companies, owned enslaved individuals on Crown lands, depended on enslaved labour to sustain its imperial power, and by the time Britain abolished slavery in 1807, had become the world's largest buyer of enslaved people. The book also outlines how The Crown profited from colonial slavery in other ways: by the Glorious Revolution of 1688, import duties on colonial sugar and tobacco accounted for a full third of The Crown's revenue, and royal family members owned enslaved people as domestic servants and used them for military service.

== Reception ==
While the British royal family does not comment on books, King Charles III said that he took the matter of slavery "profoundly seriously", according to an unnamed source.

Michael O'Donnell, writing for the Los Angeles Review of Books, said the book is written for a general audience. He described it as "briskly paced and admirably clear in delineating the numerical morass and opaque finances of the English monarchy", but that Newman's relentless focus on the British Royal family takes readers away from other culpable actors in business and government who share the blame.

In Kirkus reviews the book is described as "an account of powerful people behaving badly that’s hard to resist", but though it makes for an engrossing tale, readers may "grow tired of gnashing their teeth".

Simon Heffer of The Daily Telegraph gave the book a one out of five stars, calling the book "a specious, partisan, attention-seeking polemic masquerading as history".
