= Nina Schwalbe =

American public health researcher

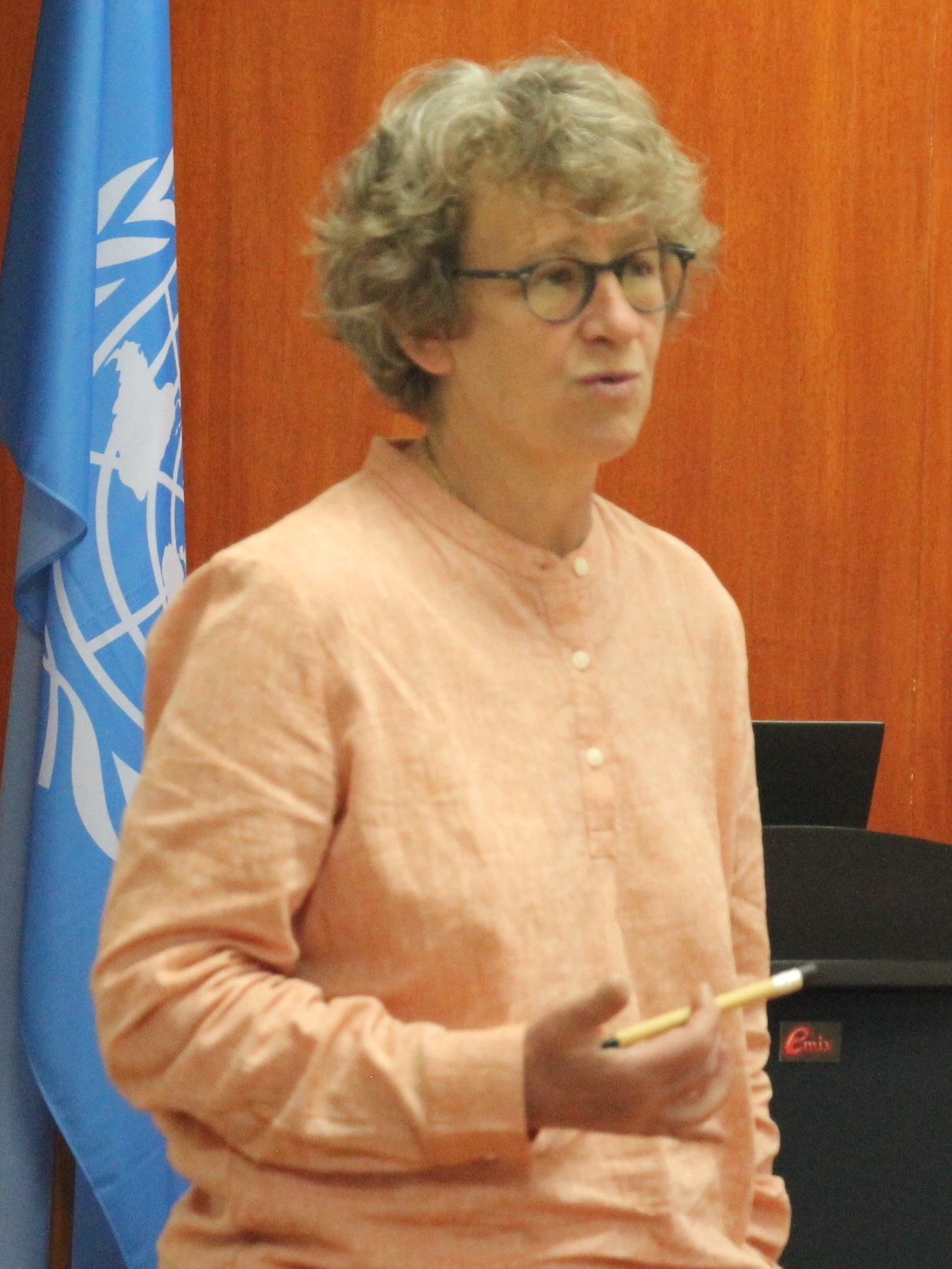
- Schwalbe at the United Nations University International Institute for Global Health in Malaysia, 2022
- Born: April 18, 1966 (age 60); Boston, Massachusetts, U.S.
- Education: Harvard University (BA); Columbia University (MPH); University of the Witwatersrand (PhD)
- Political party: Democratic
- Relatives: Mary Anne Schwalbe (mother); Will Schwalbe (brother)

Nina Schwalbe (born 18 April 1966) is an American public health researcher who is the founder of Spark Street Advisors, a public health think tank based in New York City. Schwalbe specializes in vaccines. She has held leadership positions at Gavi, UNICEF and USAID. In 2026, Schwalbe unsuccessfully ran in the 2026 primary election to represent New York's 12th district in the U.S. House of Representatives.

== Early life and education ==
Schwalbe was born in Boston, Massachusetts and grew up in New York City. Her mother, Mary Anne Schwalbe, was one of the founders of the International Rescue Committee UK, and founding director of the Women's Refugee Commission. Her brother Will Schwalbe is an author, editor, and entrepreneur.

Schwalbe was an undergraduate student in Russian and Soviet Studies at Harvard Radcliffe Colleges, where she was the recipient of the Aloian-Beal Leadership Award. Immediately after graduation, Schwalbe joined the United Nations High Commissioner for Refugees in Thailand. In 1993, Schwalbe received a Master's in Public Health from the Columbia University Mailman School of Public Health, where she concentrated on maternal and child health, as well as a certificate from Columbia's Harriman Institute for Advanced Study of the Soviet Union. She also has a Ph.D. from the University of the Witwatersrand in South Africa.

== Career ==
Schwalbe started her career in Thailand and Russia, working in reproductive health. She then worked for the Soros Foundation, establishing their public health program in Moscow. On returning to the United States she was made Director of Public Health Programs at the Open Society Institute/Soros Foundation. Amongst other global initiatives, Schwalbe worked with Paul Farmer and Partners in Health to treat drug resistant tuberculosis in Russian prisons. She was on the founding board of the Stop TB Partnership and spearheaded the development of first Global Plan to Stop TB.

In 2005, Schwalbe was made Director of Policy at the Global Alliance for TB Drug Development. In this capacity, she developed collaborations and coalitions between governments of low and lower-middle income and OECD countries, UN bodies and members of the G8 to accelerate the regulatory approval and procurement and distribution of new therapeutics for tuberculosis.

Schwalbe joined GAVI, the vaccine alliance, in 2007, serving as Deputy Executive Secretary and Managing Director for Policy and Performance. In her seven years at Gavi, Schwalbe developed policies and strategy on vaccine investment, market shaping, monitoring and evaluation, and performance management. She led the implementation of the Pneumococcal Conjugate Vaccine advanced market commitment and developed GAVI's first ever gender policy. In 2011, Schwalbe successfully negotiated with pharmaceutical companies and other stakeholders to expand the Gavi portfolio to include affordable Human papillomavirus vaccines. Schwalbe was Chair of the GAVI Evaluation Advisory Committee from 2019 to 2021.

Schwalbe worked as UNICEF's principal advisor and acting chief of health, where she oversaw health programs in over 150 countries. She was responsible for delivering over 1 billion vaccines annually to children around the world. Working with experts, frontline providers, and communities worldwide, Schwalbe developed the UNICEF Strategy for Health 2016-2030, which lays out a detailed vision for ending preventable maternal, newborn and child death and promoting the health of all children and adolescents. Schwalbe was member of the interagency design team for the Global Financing Facility for Maternal, Child, Newborn and Adolescent Health (GFF) a partnership housed at the World Bank.

=== COVID-19 response ===
In 2021, Schwalbe established and served as the first director of COVID-19 Vaccine Access and Delivery Initiative at USAID, where she coordinated distribution of 1 billion vaccine doses to low- and lower-middle income countries and the development of the GlobVax, an all of government effort to accelerate US vaccine delivery assistance around the world. Schwalbe also co-chaired WHO-UNESCO Research Network Working Group on Educational Institutions and COVID-19.

== Other activities ==
Schwalbe sits as Commissioner for The Lancet on gender and health, a commissioner for the Women's Refugee Commission, and serves as a Principal Visiting Fellow at the United Nations International Institute for Global Health. She is a lifetime member of the Council on Foreign Relations. She is also adjunct assistant professor in the Heilbronn Department of Population and Family Health at Columbia University Mailman School of Public Health.

Schwalbe now serves as Senior Scholar at Georgetown University’s Center for Global Health Policy and Politics.

== Personal life ==
Schwalbe lives in New York City with her two children.

== Selected publications ==
=== Analysis and opinion ===
- Schwalbe N. Why we need a pandemic treaty now. The Telegraph. March 31, 2025.
- Etiebet MA, Slaughter AM, Gebredhin LT LaForge G, Murrabit A, Schwalbe N. An 'impact hub' approach to transforming global maternal health outcomes by 2030. Brookings Institution. February 20, 2025.
- Schwalbe N. We cannot give on the global pandemic treaty. Financial Times. August 31, 2023.
- Schwalbe N., Hannon E. We need a pandemic treaty – but it must hold nations accountable. Washington Post. December 2022.
- Schwalbe N. Why we need a new compact on vaccines. Financial Times. May 30, 2022.
- Allotey P, Binagwaho A, Lehtimaki S, Liwanag HJ, Rhule E, Schwalbe N. Access to Education During Public Health Emergencies: Keep Schools Open. Think20 Italy; September 2021. https://www.t20italy.org/wp-content/uploads/2021/09/TF1_PB01_LM02.pdf
- Schwalbe N, Lehtimaki S. The World Should Treat Pandemics Like It Treats Chemical Weapons. Foreign Policy. Published online April 14, 2021. https://foreignpolicy.com/2021/04/14/pandemic-treaty-who-tedros-china-transparency-inspections-data-covid-19-coronavirus/
- Schwalbe N. The US now has vaccines, but no strategy on how to use them to defeat coronavirus. The BMJ Opinion. Published online December 17, 2020. https://blogs.bmj.com/bmj/2020/12/17/the-us-now-has-vaccines-but-no-strategy-on-how-to-use-them-to-defeat-coronavirus/
- Schwalbe N. Why Are We Closing Schools? The Athlantic. Published online November 19, 2020.
- Schwalbe N, Lehtimaki S, Gutiérrez JP. Non-Communicable Diseases and COVID-19: A Perfect Storm. The BMJ Opinion. Published online June 10, 2020. https://blogs.bmj.com/bmj/2020/06/10/non-communicable-diseases-and-covid-19-a-perfect-storm/

=== Journal articles ===
- Viner R, Russell S, Saulle R, Stansfield C, Croker H, Packer J, Nicholls D, Goddings AL, Bonell C, Hudson L, Hope S, Ward J, Schwalbe N, Morgan A, Minozzi S. School Closures During Social Lockdown and Mental Health, Health Behaviors, and Well-being Among Children and Adolescents During the First COVID-19 Wave: A Systematic Review. JAMA Pediatrics. Published online January 18, 2022. doi:10.1001/jamapediatrics.2021.5840
- Oliver K, Raut A, Pierre S, Silvera L, Boulos A, Gale A, Baum A, Chory A, David NJ, D'Souza D, Freeman A, Goytia C, Hamilton A, Horowitz C, Islam N, Jeavons J, Knudson J, Li S, Lupi J, Martin R, Maru S, Nabeel I, Pimenova D, Romanoff A, Rusanov S, Swalbe N, Vangeepuram N, Vreeman R, Masci J, Maru D. Factors associated with COVID-19 vaccine receipt at two integrated healthcare systems in New York City: a cross-sectional study of healthcare workers. BMJ Open. 2022;12:e05341. doi:10.1136/bmjopen-2021-053641
- Aars OK, Clark M, Schwalbe N. Increasing efficiency in vaccine production: A primer for change. Vaccine: X. 2021;8(100104). doi: https://doi.org/10.1016/j.jvacx.2021.100104
- Schwalbe N, Wahl B. Artificial Intelligence and the Future of Global Health. Lancet. 2020;395(10236):1579-1586. doi:10.1016/S0140-6736(20)30226-9
- Kettler H, Lehtimaki S, Schwalbe N. Accelerating Access to Medicines in a Changing World. Bulletin of the World Health Organization. 2020;98:641-643. doi:10.2471/BLT.19.249664
