= White Girls =

Essay collection by Hilton Als

- First edition
- Author: Hilton Als
- Language: English
- Genre: Memoir, essays
- Published: 2013
- Publisher: McSweeney's
- Publication place: United States

White Girls is a nonfiction book by Hilton Als, published November 5, 2013 by McSweeney's.

== Overview ==
Combining elements of memoir, criticism, fiction and non-fiction, the book's essays create a portrait of "white girls", a category in which Als includes everyone from Truman Capote to Flannery O’Connor and even Malcolm X. The book explores themes of identity, otherness, commonality, and interpersonal relationships as a kind of "twinship".

== Awards ==
White Girls awards and honors
Year	Award	Result	Ref.
2014	Randy Shilts Award for Gay Nonfiction	Winner	
2014	Lambda Literary Award for LGBT Nonfiction	Winner	
2013	National Book Critics Circle Award for Criticism	Finalist	
