= Charlotte Hennessey =

American actress

Charlotte Hennessey Pickford
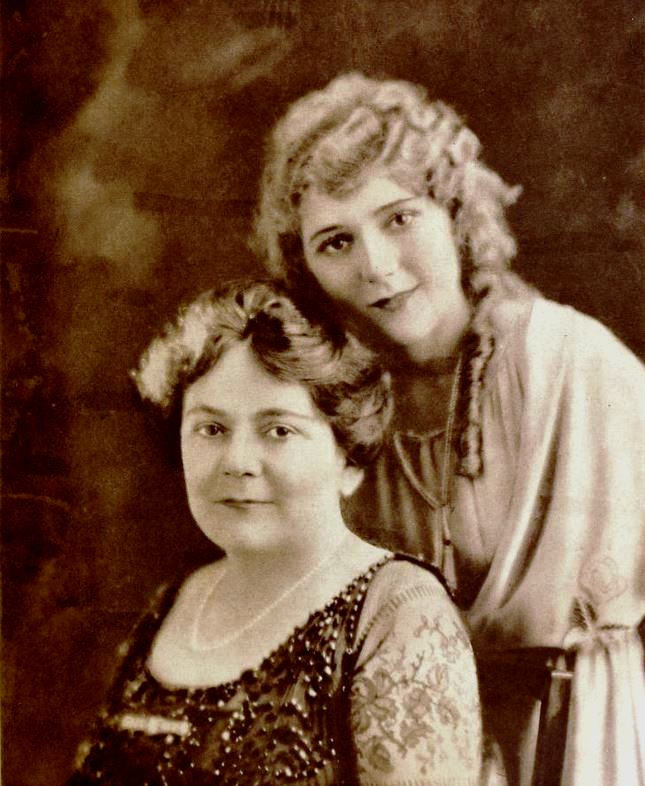
- Hennessey and her daughter Mary Pickford in 1919
- Born: Charlotte Hennessey; January 1, 1873; Toronto, Ontario, Canada
- Died: March 22, 1928 (aged 55); Los Angeles, California, U.S.
- Resting place: Forest Lawn Memorial Park, Glendale
- Occupation: Actress
- Spouse: John Charles Smith (m. 1892; died 1898)
- Children: Mary Pickford; Lottie Pickford; Jack Pickford

Charlotte Hennessey Pickford (formerly Smith; January 1, 1873 – March 22, 1928) was a Canadian stage and silent film actress and the mother of Mary, Lottie, and Jack Pickford, who all became actors.

== Early life and marriage ==
Born in Toronto, Ontario, Canada, to Irish Catholic parents from Ballyduff, County Kerry, Charlotte Hennessey supported herself as a seamstress. She married John Charles Smith, a son of English Methodist immigrants. She agreed to rear their children in his Methodist faith. The couple had three children: Gladys Louise, later actress Mary Pickford; Charlotte, later actress Lottie Pickford; and John Charles, later actor Jack Pickford.

== Film industry ==
In 1898, John Charles Smith died from a blood clot caused by a workplace accident when he was a purser with the Niagara Steamship Lines. Now a widow, Charlotte Smith struggled to make a living. She allowed her eldest daughter, Gladys, to take some theatre roles in Toronto in parts for children and, as the other children grew, toured with them with theater companies around the United States. They moved to New York, where Gladys landed a role on Broadway. Soon Gladys was able to get some film work, and changed her name to Mary Pickford at the request of a director. Later both her other children adopted Pickford as a surname for their acting work.

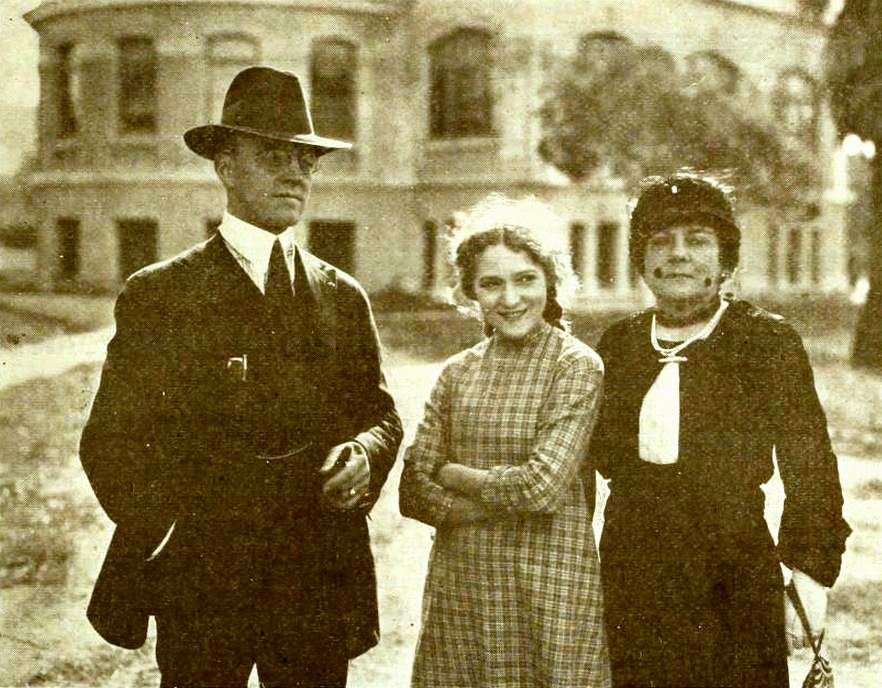
Harry O. Schwalbe, Mary Pickford dressed for her role in the film Daddy-Long-Legs (1919), and Charlotte Hennessey.

After her daughter, Gladys, known then as actress Mary Pickford, started getting film roles, Charlotte Smith acted in minor parts in three silent films in 1910 and 1911, with her daughter. All three children: Mary, Lottie, and Jack Pickford, became actors, although only Mary Pickford achieved great fame and fortune. Charlotte continued to play a large role in managing her children's careers. She negotiated her daughter Mary Pickford's landmark contracts in the United States as a child star (including her $1 million a year contract, the first of its kind). Smith took a role in United Artists and the Mary Pickford Film Company, founded by her daughter, until her death.

== Death ==
On March 22, 1928, Smith died of breast cancer after refusing additional surgery. She had already had several major operations. She was buried in the Pickford plot at Forest Lawn Memorial Park in Glendale, California. She bequeathed $200,000 (approximately $3.5 million in 2023 dollars) each in trust to her two younger children, Jack and Lottie, and to Lottie's daughter Gwynne. She left the large bulk of her estate to her eldest daughter Mary of $1 million (approximately $17 million in 2023 dollars), and she acknowledged the reasons in her will: "Whatever property I possess at the time of my death has come to me through my association with my beloved daughter in her business and through her most unusual generosity to me."

== Filmography ==
- A Victim of Jealousy (1910)
- The Impalement (1910)
- Sweet Memories (1911)

== In popular culture ==
Rachel Wilson portrays Hennessey in episode 12 of season 15 "There's Something About Mary" (January 3, 2022), of the Canadian television period detective series Murdoch Mysteries.
