= Ralston College =

Liberal arts college in Savannah, Georgia

- Motto: Animus crescat (Latin)
- Motto in English: "Let your mind expand" "Let your spirit rise" "Let your courage thrive"
- Type: Private institution of higher learning
- Established: 2010; 16 years ago
- Founder: Stephen Blackwood
- Accreditation: Unaccredited
- Chancellor: Iain McGilchrist
- President: Stephen Blackwood
- Academic staff: 6 (2025)
- Students: 24 (Fall 2022)
- Location: Savannah, Georgia, United States; 32°4′15″N 81°5′48″W
- Campus: Urban
- Colors: Black and White
- Website: ralston.ac
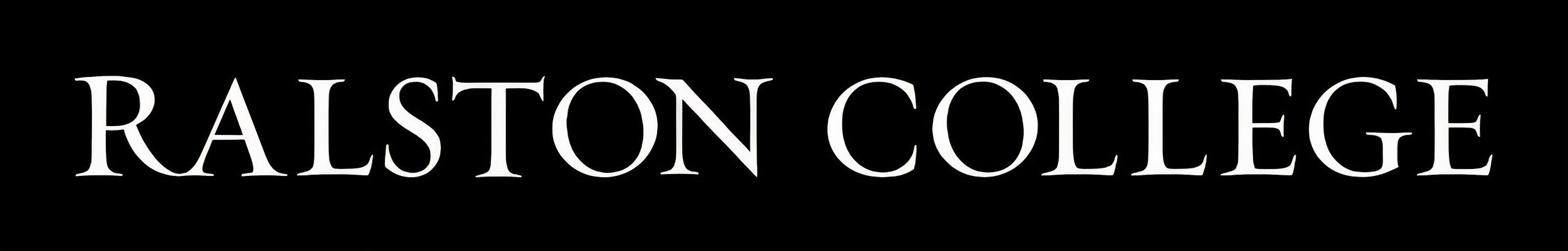

Ralston College is a private unaccredited liberal arts college in Savannah, Georgia. It describes itself as being dedicated to "freedom of thought and speech", and is associated with prominent conservative figures, with Stephen Blackwood as president, Jordan B. Peterson as its former Chancellor and funding from conservatives including Paul Marshall. The first cohort of graduate students for Ralston College's one-year MA in the Humanities began the program in the fall of 2022.

== History ==
In 2006, Stephen Blackwood and James Atkins Pritchard began fundraising for the establishment of an institution of higher education. It is named in memory of the Rector of St John's Episcopal Church, William H. Ralston Jr (1929-2003). Ralston College was incorporated in the State of Georgia in 2010. Among the members of its Board of Visitors are Vernon Smith, Heather Mac Donald, Harry Lewis, Ruth Wisse, Roger Kimball, Stephen Wolfram, and Jordan Peterson, who was formerly Chancellor (a ceremonial role). Iain McGilchrist became the Chancellor in October 2025.

Ralston's first cohort of MA students was enrolled on the Greek island of Samos in the fall of 2022, before beginning their studies in Savannah that fall; classes were held in the education building of St. John's Episcopal Church. The college has since moved into buildings on East Gaston Street and West McDonough Street in the historic Savannah area, which total 50,000 square feet as of April 2024. As of June 2026, the college has graduated four cohorts.

Ralston College has received criticism for a series of high-level terminations, as reported by unnamed sources. In March 2023, a member of Ralston's Board of Visitors, Harvey Silverglate, resigned his position and stated that the college was "antithetical to the whole concept of a liberal arts institution".

== Academics ==
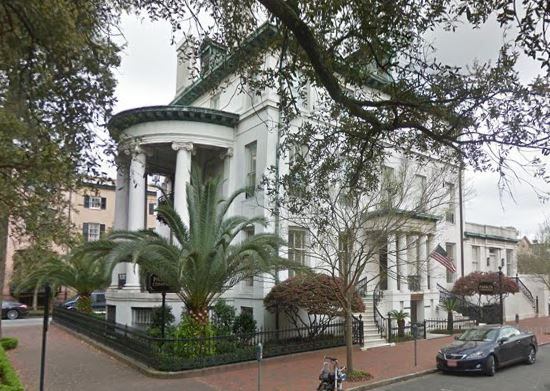
The Philbrick-Eastman House, current location of the college's main campus

=== Curriculum and programs ===
Ralston College's curriculum focuses on the liberal arts: after a term studying Ancient Greek and Modern Greek in Greece, the following three terms of the MA in the Humanities are based in Savannah, focusing on ancient, medieval and modern literary texts and works of art. Blackwood has stated that Ralston aims “to play a role in the renewal of the conditions for human flourishing”. The one-year MA program revolves around a particular philosophical theme that lasts the entire year: "the self" (2022–2023), "the whole" (2023–2024), "nature" (2024–2025) and "fellowship" (2025–2026).

The college also offers two online short-courses, run in conjunction with the FutureLearn platform, one on Samuel Johnson's philosophical romance Rasselas, and one on the poetry of Robert Frost.

=== Enrollment ===
In the fall of 2022, the school had 24 students.

== Accreditation ==
Ralston College is not accredited. The college has been authorized for operation and awarded degree-granting powers by the State of Georgia. It was approved by the New England Commission of Higher Education as a candidate for accreditation in April 2025.

== Arms ==
Coat of arms of Ralston College
Notes Granted by the College of Arms on 27th April 2022. Crest A lion's gamb Or armed and enfiling a circlet of roses Gules barbed and seeded Proper holding an open book Sable the pages Argent ensigned by a mullet of four points irradiated Or. Torse Argent and Sable. Escutcheon Per chevron embowed Sable and Argent the apex thereof between two pheons the socket of each conjoined to a pallet issuant in base in middle chief a mullet of four points all counterchanged. Motto Animus Crescat Badge Three roses Gules barbed and seeded Proper the slips conjoined in base Vert surmounted by an open book Or.
