= Die Schwalbe =

German chess composition society and magazine

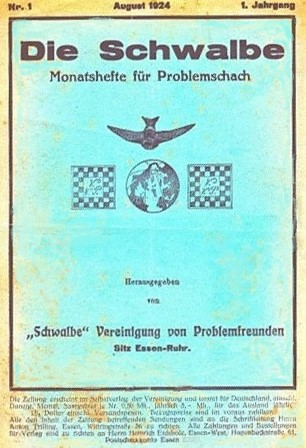
№1, 1. Jaargang, August 1924, 8 pages with 21 diagrams

Die Schwalbe (English: "The Swallow") is the German chess composition society. It issues the bimonthly magazine Die Schwalbe.

== Society ==
Die Schwalbe was founded on 10 February 1924 in Essen as Vereinigung von Problemfreunden zur Förderung der Aufgabenkunst (Society of problem friends for advancement of chess composition art). There were 15 founding fathers from the Ruhr Area lead-managed by Wilhelm Maßmann. Anton Trilling was their first president. In 1972 Die Schwalbe became a member of Deutscher Schachbund (German chess union) initiated by Gerhard Wolfgang Jensch.

Johannes Hinsken from Bottrop proposed the name of the society. The name traces back to a famous four-mover entitled Eine Schwalbe composed by Johannes Kohtz (1843–1918) and Carl Kockelkorn (1843–1914). The elderly problemists, who composed Eine Schwalbe after a hiatus of some years, published the problem with the motto "Eine Schwalbe macht noch keinen Sommer." (One swallow does not make a summer.)

Johannes Kohtz and Carl Kockelkorn
Eine Schwalbe, 1911

Position: e8 black knight, f8 white king, g8 black knight, b7 white queen, c6 black pawn, f6 white pawn, b5 black pawn, g4 black rook, c3 white pawn, e3 white bishop, b2 white knight, d2 white knight, e2 black pawn, g2 black bishop, e1 black king

Mate in 4 moves

The solution exclusively consists of moves by the white queen, who flits back and forth like a swallow (Schwalbe). 1.Qa7? (threatens Qa1#) is refuted by 1...Ra4!, and 1.Qh7? (threatens 2.Qb1#) is refuted by 1...Re4!

1.Qf7! (threatens 2.Nd3+ Kd1 3.Qb3#) Bd5
2.Qa7 (threatens Qa1#) Ra4
3.Qh7! (threatens Qb1#) Re4 obstructs the diagonal of the bishop or Be4 obstructs the rank of the rook)
4.Qh1/h4 mate

This problem is the earliest example in which a Grimshaw is preceded by critical moves by both Rook and Bishop.: In the third move the black rook and the black bishop mutually obstruct in the point of intersection e4. This is outstanding aesthetically, because in the preceding moves both pieces only have been directed back critically over e4 (the bishop in the first, the rook in the second move). Only after that can white exploit the point of intersection e4 during the third move.

== Magazine ==
The magazine Die Schwalbe appeared the first time in July 1924. Since that date it issues bimonthly. Only between 1943 and 1946 the appearance had been broken by the war. The then president of the society Wilhelm Karsch bridged that time sending all members Mitteilungen der Schwalbe (notes of the society). Die Schwalbe is worldwide recognised as a trade magazine. In the magazine chess compositions and solutions are published, composition tournaments announced and articles about chess compositions published.
