= Peterson–Žižek debate =

2019 event

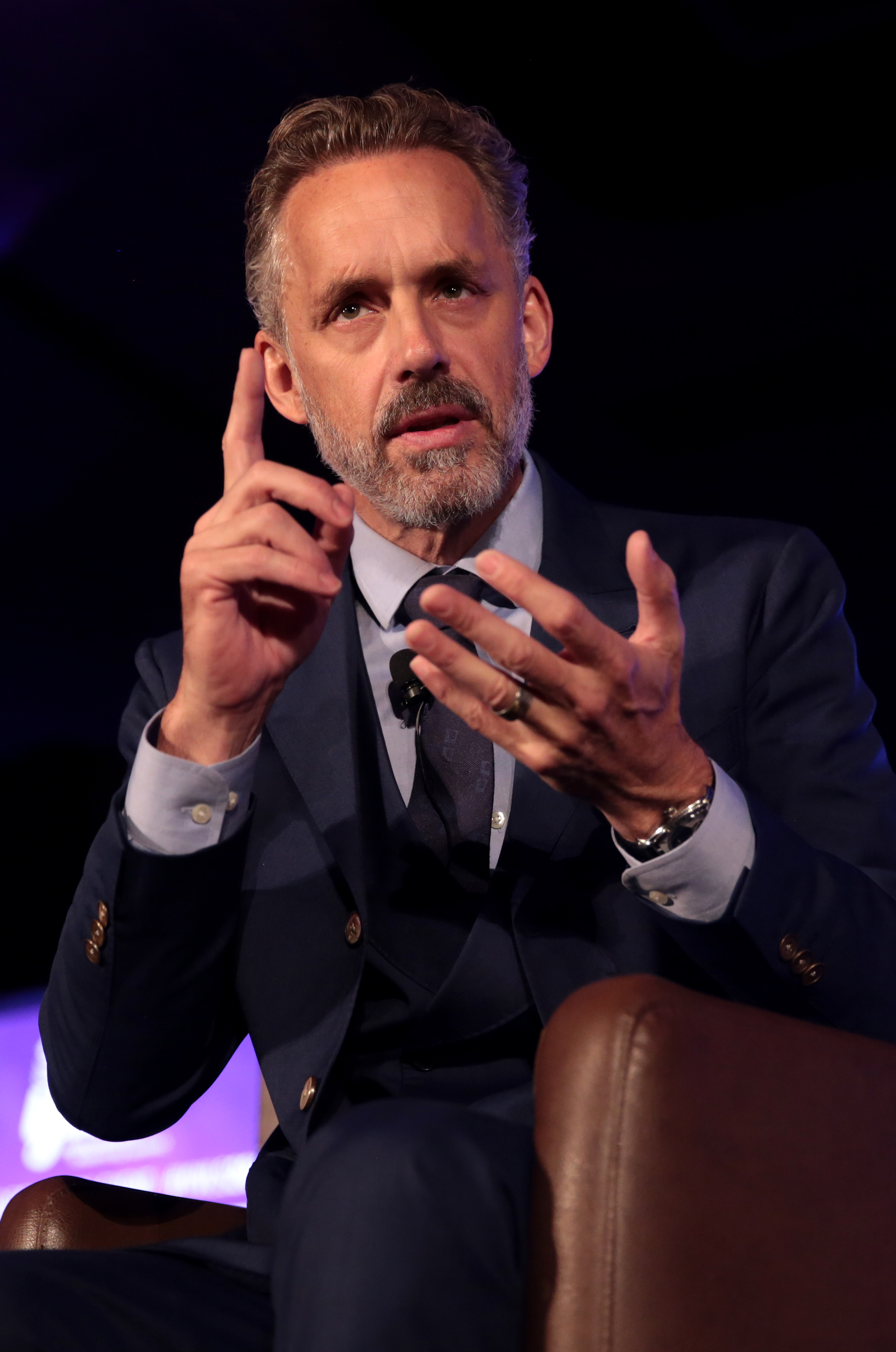
Jordan Peterson

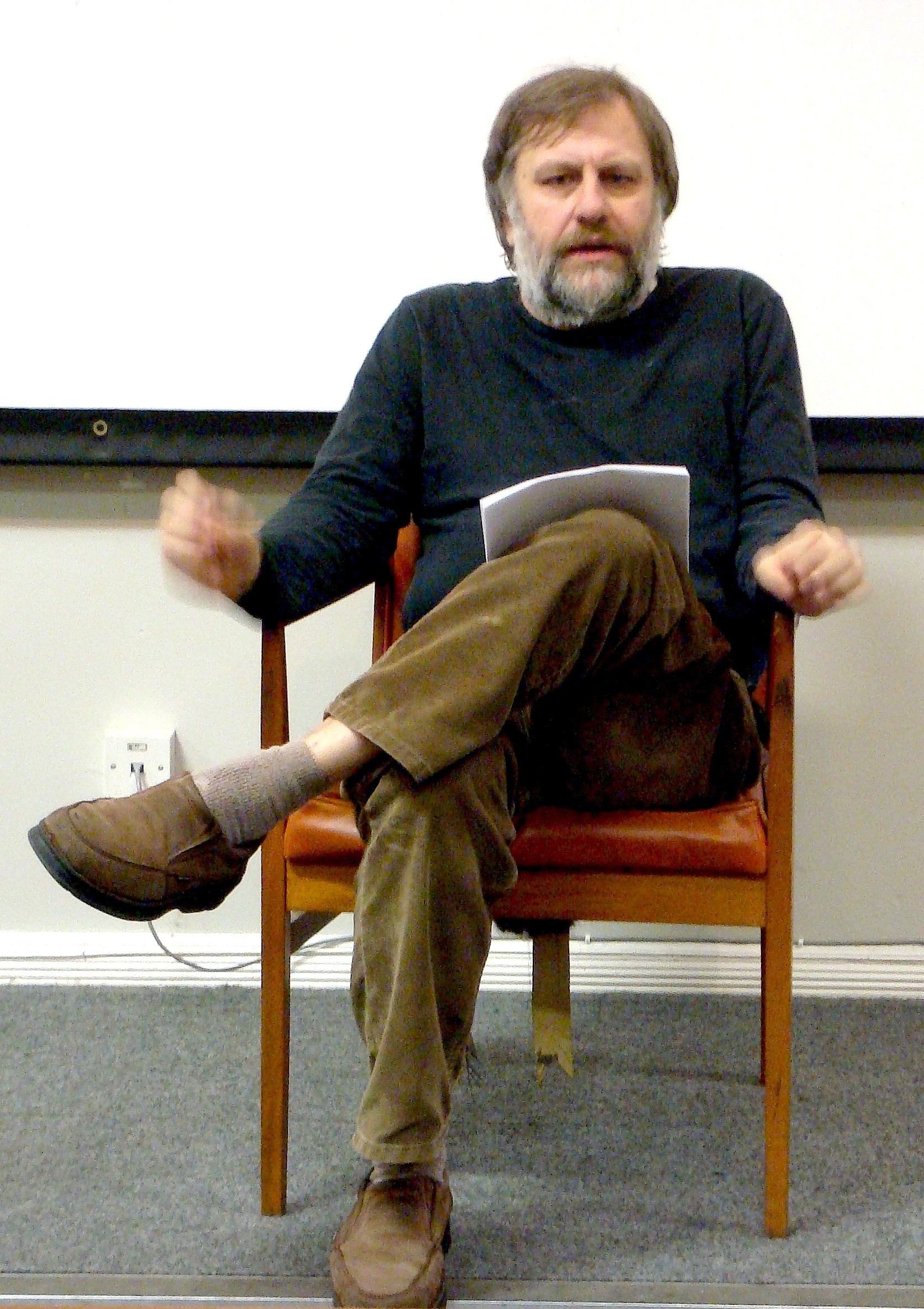
Slavoj Žižek

The Peterson–Žižek debate, officially titled Happiness: Capitalism vs. Marxism, was a debate between the Canadian psychologist Jordan Peterson (a critic of Marxism) and the Slovenian philosopher Slavoj Žižek (a Marxist theorist and Hegelian) on the relationship between Marxism, capitalism, and happiness. Moderated by Stephen J. Blackwood, it was held before an audience of 3,000 at Meridian Hall in Toronto on 19 April 2019.

In the debate, Peterson and Žižek agreed on many issues, including a criticism of political correctness and identity politics. They debated about the merits of regulated capitalism. Both rejected happiness as a primary goal for individuals and societies.

== Background ==
During an event at the Cambridge Union in November 2018, Žižek had called Peterson's work "pseudo-scientific", described him as his "enemy", and criticized Peterson's work on the idea of a cultural Marxism. Separately, Žižek stated in The Independent that "his crazy conspiracy theory about LGBT+ rights and #MeToo as the final offshoots of the Marxist project to destroy the West is, of course, ridiculous." The term "cultural Marxism" became mainstream in 2016, when Peterson was objecting to a Canadian bill that would prohibit discrimination based on gender identity, which he argued would force people to use someone's preferred pronouns. In Peterson's view, this would violate freedom of speech. Critics have accused Peterson of misusing the term postmodernism, referring to postmodern philosophy, as a stand in term for the far-right and antisemitic Cultural Marxism conspiracy theory.

Peterson said he could meet "any time, any place" to debate and it was announced on 28 February 2019 that the debate was scheduled for 19 April 2019. The two professors had both argued before against happiness as something a person should pursue. Peterson had said that people should seek meaning through personal responsibility and Žižek had said that happiness is pointless and delusional.

== Debate ==
Around 3,000 people were in Meridian Hall in Toronto for the event. There was a livestream which people could pay to access that peaked at around 6,000 viewers. Billed by some as "the debate of the century", the event had more tickets scalped than the Toronto Maple Leafs–Boston Bruins playoff on the same day, and tickets sold on eBay for over $300. The debate was also broadcast on Croatian Radiotelevision the following week.

The debate was divided into two thirty-minute introductions from each participant, followed by shorter ten-minute responses and time at the end for additional comments and answers to questions posed by the moderator, Stephen J. Blackwood. Its topic was which "political-economic model provided the great opportunity for human happiness: capitalism or Marxism".

Peterson's opening monologue was a reading and critical analysis of The Communist Manifesto. He asserted that it is wrong to perceive history only through a lens of class struggle, there is no exclusively "good" proletariat and "bad" bourgeoisie, such identity politics is prone to authoritarian manipulation, and that in his view, people do not climb the social hierarchies only by taking advantage of others. Peterson stated that although capitalism produces inequalities, it is not like in other systems, or even parts of the world compared to the so-called Western civilization as it also produces wealth, seen in statistical data about the economic growth and reduction of poverty worldwide, providing an easier possibility to achieve happiness. Similarly to Winston Churchill's quote about democracy, he concluded that "capitalism is the worst economic system, except for all the others".

At the beginning of his opening monologue, Žižek noted avoidance to participate in the debate in the role of an opponent and that both were victims of left liberals. The monologue itself was less focused as it touched many topics and things like cultural liberalism, Nazism, Bernie Sanders, Donald Trump, Fyodor Dostoevsky, and xenophobia, among others; and against the expectation of the debate format, it did not defend Marxism. On the example of China, he tried to connect happiness, capitalism, and Marxism as well criticize China itself and asserted that "less hierarchical, more egalitarian social structure would stand to produce great amounts of this auxiliary happiness-runoff".

Later in the debate, Žižek agreed with Peterson's opening analysis and called for regulation and limitation of the market for capitalism to reduce the risk of natural and social disasters. Žižek was also critical of the multiculturalist liberals who espouse identity politics and that Western countries should rather fix the situation in immigrants' home countries than accept them. Due to lack of defence for Marxism, at one point Peterson asked Žižek why he associates with this ideology and not his philosophical originality, to which Žižek answered that he is rather a Hegelian and that capitalism has too many antagonisms for long-term peaceful sustainability. In a similar fashion, Žižek asked Peterson to name individual "postmodern neo-Marxists" in Western academia because, according to him, the over-the-top political correctness is opposed to Marxism; Peterson replied that his references were aimed towards ideas that are connected with Marxism and postmodernism as a phenomenon and not necessarily towards people defining themselves as such. In the end, they both agreed that happiness is rather a byproduct of life itself.

== Reception ==
Several publications, such as Current Affairs, The Guardian and Jacobin, criticized Peterson for being uninformed on Marxism and seemingly ill-prepared for the debate. Harrison Fluss and Sam Miller of Jacobin reported that Peterson made many factual errors, such as misunderstanding the labour theory of value, incorrectly associating Marx broadly with identity politics, and denying the existence of a Marxist philosophy of nature. Stephen Marche of The Guardian wrote that Peterson's opening remarks about The Communist Manifesto were "vague and not particularly informed", and that Peterson seemed generally unprepared, while Jordan Foissy of Vice wrote that Peterson was "completely vacuous", making "ludicrous claims like no one has ever gotten power through exploiting people". Der Spiegel concluded that Žižek won the debate clearly, describing Peterson as "so vain he showed up to an artillery battle with a pocket knife".

Writing for Current Affairs, Benjamin Studebaker criticized both Peterson and Žižek, calling the debate "one of the most pathetic displays in the history of intellectuals arguing with each other in public". Studebaker wrote that "Žižek read a bizarre, meandering, canned speech which had very little to do with anything Peterson said or with the assigned topic. This is a pity, because Peterson made an argument I have seen many times, one which is incredibly easy to beat." Studebaker concludes that "Peterson didn't prepare. There was an opportunity. But Žižek was too busy complaining about identity politics and his status within academia to try. He's the sort of aging quitter we all hope to never be."

In commenting directly on how the debate was received, Žižek wrote: "It is typical that many comments on the debate pointed out how Peterson's and my position are really not so distinct, which is literally true in the sense that, from their standpoint, they cannot see the difference between the two of us: I am as suspicious as Peterson. So as I saw it, the task of this debate was to at least clarify our differences."

== See also ==
- Cassirer–Heidegger debate
- Chomsky–Foucault debate
- Foucault–Habermas debate
