= Mary Anne Schwalbe =

American university administrator and refugee worker

Mary Anne Schwalbe (née Goldsmith; March 31, 1934 – September 14, 2009) was a university administrator and refugee worker. She served as Associate Dean of Admissions at Harvard University, and was the Founding Director for the Women's Commission for Refugee Women and Children, now known as the Women's Refugee Commission. Her losing two-year battle with pancreatic cancer was detailed in her son Will Schwalbe's book, The End of Your Life Book Club.

== Early life and career ==
Mary Anne Goldsmith was born on March 31, 1934, in New York. Her father, James Alfred Goldsmith, Jr., worked for Hess, Goldsmith & Co, a textile firm founded by his grandfather. She graduated from the Brearley School in 1951 and from Radcliffe College in 1955. where she majored in English and performed in drama productions. She then attended the London Academy of Dramatic Arts. She worked for Frederick Brisson and the Playwrights' Company when she wed Douglas Schwalbe on December 6, 1959, in her hometown of Westport, Connecticut. Her son Will Schwalbe is an author and entrepreneur, and her daughter, Nina Schwalbe, is a public health researcher.

Schwalbe worked at Radcliffe and later at Harvard University, where she served as Associate Dean and Director of Admissions.

== Refugee work ==
Schwalbe was a supporter of refugees cause in Thailand and later in Afghanistan. She was involved with the International Rescue Committee (IRC) and was the Founding Director for the Women's Commission for Refugee Women and Children, now known as the Women's Refugee Commission. During this time she also served as an electoral observer in the Balkans. She also raised funds for a library in Kabul and traveling libraries for Afghanistan.

== The End of Your Life Book Club ==
Schwalbe's life and works are memorialized in her son Will Schwalbe's book, The End of Your Life Book Club, which recounts how they bonded through a shared love of books while she was undergoing treatment for pancreatic cancer.
