= Mark D. Jordan =

Scholar of Christian theology, European philosophy, and gender studies

- Occupation: Professor
- Awards: Randy Shilts Award (2011)

Academic background
- Education: St. John's College; University of Texas at Austin

Academic work
- Institutions: Harvard University; Emory University; University of Notre Dame; Washington University in St. Louis
- Doctoral students: Stephen J. Blackwood

Mark D. Jordan (born 1953) is a scholar of Christian theology, European philosophy, and gender studies. He is currently the Richard Reinhold Niebuhr Research Professor of Divinity at Harvard Divinity School and Professor of the Studies of Women, Gender, and Sexuality in the Harvard Faculty of Arts and Sciences.

At Harvard, he teaches courses on the Western traditions of Christian theology, the relations of religion to art or literature, and the prospects for sexual ethics. Jordan also writes on gender, sexuality, and the relationship between religious doctrine and LGBT issues. In addition to his scholarship and classroom teaching, Jordan has discussed sexual and religious issues to audiences that range from college lectureships to National Public Radio, the New York Times, and CNN.

Jordan's most recent books are Teaching Bodies: Moral Formation in the Summa of Thomas Aquinas (Fordham 2016) and Convulsing Bodies: Religion and Resistance in Foucault (Stanford 2015).

== Earlier affiliations and awards ==
Prior to his return to Harvard in 2014, Jordan held endowed professorships at Emory University, Washington University in St. Louis, University of Notre Dame and at Harvard University.

In 2019, it was announced that Jordan would be elected to the American Academy of Arts and Sciences. In 2011, Jordan won the annual Randy Shilts Award for nonfiction for his book, Recruiting Young Love: How Christians Talk about Homosexuality. He has received a Guggenheim Fellowship, a Fulbright-Hays grant (Spain), a Luce Fellowship in Theology, and a grant from the Ford Foundation.

== Early life and education ==
Jordan received his BA from St. John's College and his Ph.D. from the University of Texas at Austin. He grew up in Dallas, where he graduated from St. Mark's School of Texas.

== Books ==
- Ordering Wisdom: The Hierarchy of Philosophical Discourses in Aquinas, Notre Dame, 1986
- The Invention of Sodomy in Christian Theology, Chicago, 1997
- The Silence of Sodom: Homosexuality in Modern Catholicism, The University of Chicago Press, 2000
- The Ethics of Sex, Blackwell 2001
- Telling Truths in Church, Beacon 2002
- Rewritten Theology: Aquinas After His Readers, Blackwell 2005d
- Blessing Same-Sex Unions, Chicago 2005
- Recruiting Young Love: How Christians Talk about Homosexuality, Chicago 2011
- Convulsing Bodies: Religion and Resistance in Foucault, Stanford 2015
- Teaching Bodies: Traditions of Moral Formation in Thomas Aquinas, Fordham 2016
- Transforming Fire: Imagining Christian Teaching, Eerdmans 2021
- Queer Callings: Untimely Notes on Names and Desires, Fordham 2024

== See also ==
- Notable alumni of St. Mark's School of Texas
