= Harry O. Schwalbe =

American businessman

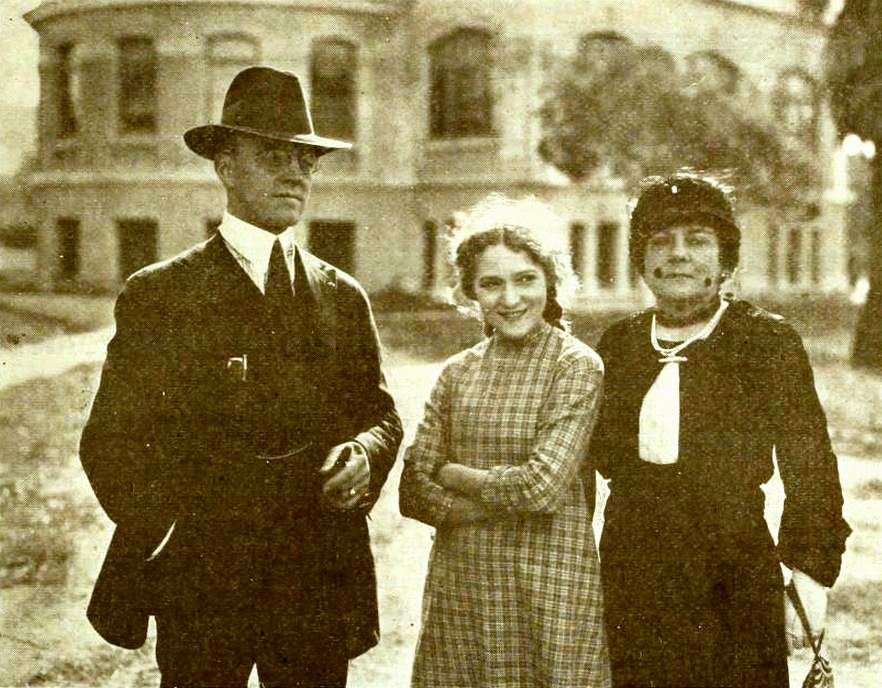
- First National Pictures Secretary Harry O. Schwalbe, Mary Pickford dressed for her role in the film Daddy-Long-Legs (1919), and Mary's mother Charlotte Hennessey.
- Born: Harry Otto Schwalbe; February 8, 1874
- Died: May 21, 1935 (aged 61); Atlantic City, New Jersey, U.S.
- Occupations: Secretary; treasurer

Harry Otto Schwalbe (February 8, 1874 - 21 May 1935, Atlantic City General Hospital, Atlantic City) was Secretary and Treasurer of First National Pictures, Inc., until he tendered his resignation at the end of the fiscal year in April 1925. According to a New York Clipper article dated July 21, 1920, Schwalbe and his partner E.S. O'Keefe purchased the City Theatre in Atlantic City for a reported sum of $200,000. On April 14, 1921, Schwalbe completed the purchase of the Keystone hotel property in Conshohocken, Pennsylvania, with the intention of razing the buildings on that property to develop a modern motion picture theatre that would seat 1,200.
