= Gregory D. Smithers =

Australian-born enthohistorian

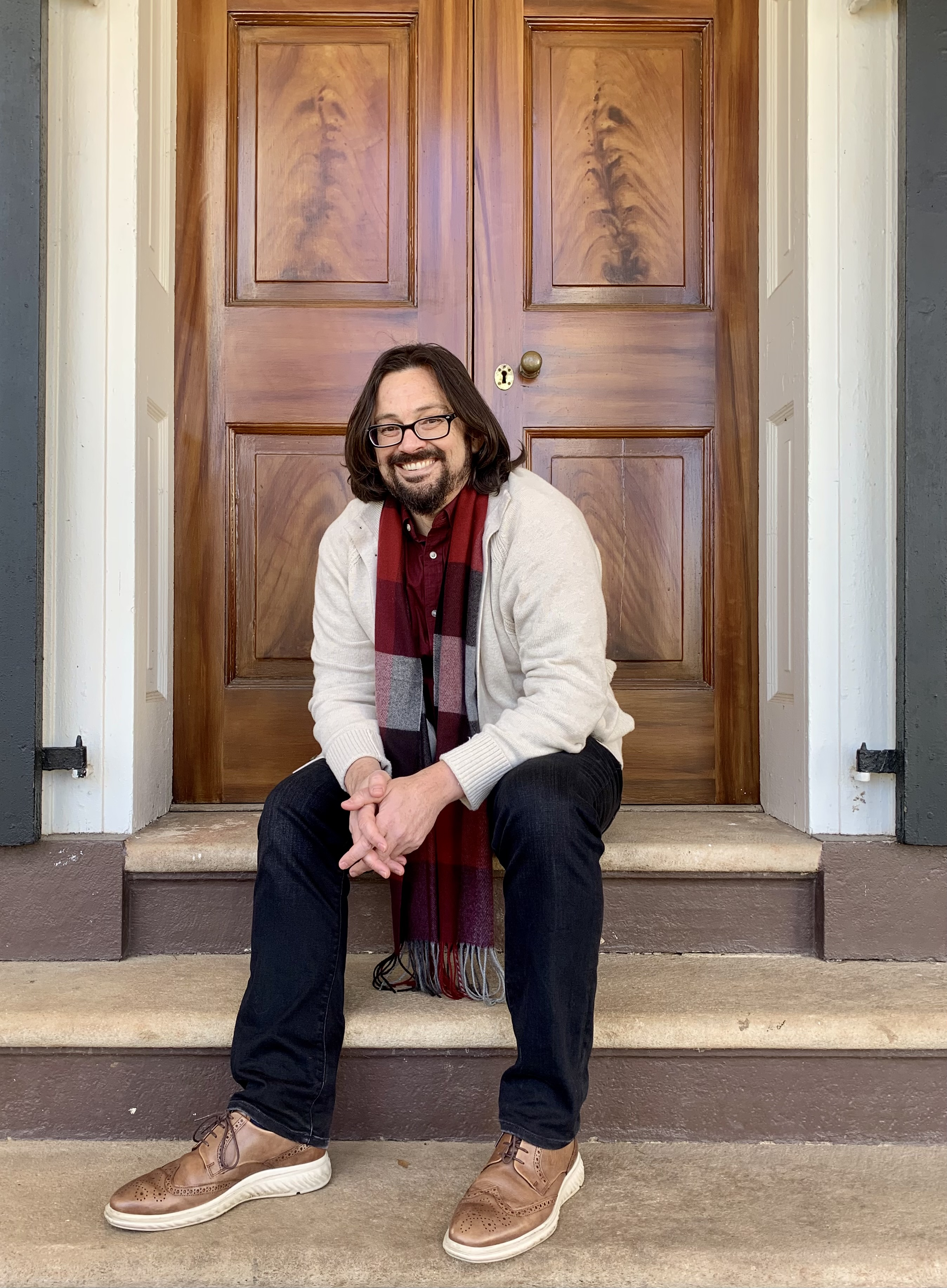
Gregory D. Smithers in 2021

Gregory D. Smithers (born 1974) is a professor of American history at Virginia Commonwealth University in Richmond, Virginia. An ethnohistorian, Smithers specializes in Native American and African American histories.

== Early life and education ==
Born in Sydney, Australia, Smithers received degrees from the Australian Catholic University and the University of California, Davis. In 2019 he was awarded a British Academy Global Professorship for his work on Indigenous environmental history in the United States and Australia.

== Career ==
Smithers is the author of numerous historical books, many of which focus on Native American and African American histories. In a 2022 interview with the Bay Area Reporter, Smithers said that he is "attracted to topics most other historians have historically not touched, or handled pretty shabbily."

In 2012, he published Slave Breeding: Sex, Violence, and Memory in African American History which addressed the history of slave breeding and the sexual abuse of slaves in the United States. In the book, Smithers also explores the historical memory of slave breeding in the African American community, and its impact on the sexual objectification of black people in contemporary culture. The book was praised for presenting multiple viewpoints by including a diverse set of sources. However, it received some criticism for conflating slave breeding with other types of abuse and the separation of enslaved families.

His 2015 book The Cherokee Diaspora: An Indigenous History of Migration, Resettlement, and Identity about the Indian Removal Act's impact on the Cherokee Nation's history. The book won a gold medal in the multicultural nonfiction category of the Independent Publisher Book Awards.

Smithers published Native Southerners: Indigenous History from Origins to Removal, a monograph on Native Americans in the southeastern United States, in 2019.

In 2022, he published an interdisciplinary history of two-spirit identity entitled Reclaiming Two-Spirits: Sexuality, Spiritual Renewal & Sovereignty in Native America. In addition to his writings, Smithers also produced a digital history in 2022 entitled "Cherokee Riverkeepers." Completed in partnership with the Digital Humanities Institute at the University of Sheffield, "Cherokee Riverkeepers" includes an interactive map that uses the Cherokee language to understand the historical significance of rivers in Southern Appalachia.

== Publications ==
- Reclaiming Two-Spirits: Sexuality, Spiritual Renewal & Sovereignty in Native America. With a foreword by Blackfeet Elder Raven E. Heavy Runner. Beacon Press, 2022.
- Native Southerners: Indigenous History from Origins to Removal. University of Oklahoma Press, 2019.
- Contributing editor, Indigenous Histories of the American South during the Long Nineteenth Century. Routledge, 2018. ISBN 978-0-8061-6228-7. OCLC 1051135712
- Science, Sexuality, and Race in the United States and Australia, 1780-1940. Revised 2nd edition, University of Nebraska Press, 2017. ISBN 978-1-4962-0098-3. OCLC 971021056
- The Cherokee Diaspora: An Indigenous History of Migration, Resettlement, and Identity. Lamar Series in Western History, Yale University Press, 2015. ISBN 978-0-300-16960-7. OCLC 910504335
- Co-author with Brian D. Behnken. Racism in American Popular Media: From Aunt Jemima to the Frito Bandito. Racism in American Institutions Series, Praeger Press, 2015.
- Co-editor with Brooke N. Newman. Native Diasporas: Indigenous Identities and Settler Colonialism in the Americas. University of Nebraska Press, 2014.
- Slave Breeding: Sex, Violence & Memory in African American History. University Press of Florida. 2012. ISBN 0-8130-4960-1. OCLC 842364394
- Co-author with Clarence E. Walker. The Preacher & the Politician: Jeremiah Wright, Barack Obama & Race in America. University of Virginia Press, 2009.
- Science, Sexuality, and Race in the United States and Australia, 1780s-1890s. Routledge Advances in American History, Routledge, 2008.
