= Brooke N. Newman =

American historian

- Born: Houston, Texas, US
- Education: Texas State University; University of California, Davis
- Occupation: Historian

Brooke N. Newman is an American historian. She is an associate professor at Virginia Commonwealth University and a Fellow of the Royal Historical Society.

== Biography ==
Newman was born and raised in Houston, Texas, United States.

Newman earned a bachelor's degree in history and English from Texas State University and a PhD in history from the University of California, Davis.

Newman's 2026 book, The Crown's Silence, documents that although Britain had abolished the slave trade in its empire in 1807, the British crown had been the world's largest buyer of enslaved people.

== Publications ==
- Native Diasporas: Indigenous Identities and Settler Colonialism in the Americas. University of Nebraska Press, 2014. Co-editor with Gregory D. Smithers.
- A Dark Inheritance: Blood, Race, and Sex in Colonial Jamaica. Yale, 2018
- The Crown's Silence: The Hidden History of Slavery and the British Monarchy. Mariner, 2026
