= Neuroendocrine Tumor Research Foundation =

Nonprofit organization in Boston, United States

- Abbreviation: NETRF
- Formation: 2005
- Founder: Nancy Lindholm
- Type: Nonprofit corporation
- Tax ID no.: 20-1945347
- Headquarters: Boston, Massachusetts, United States
- Chief Executive Officer: Elyse Gellerman
- Revenue: $3,993,657 (2024)
- Expenses: $3,778,477 (2024)
- Website: www.netrf.org

The Neuroendocrine Tumor Research Foundation (NETRF), previously known as the Caring for Carcinoid Foundation (CFCF), is a nonprofit corporation organized under the laws of Massachusetts in order to support neuroendocrine and carcinoid cancer research in the public interest. The foundation is accredited by the Better Business Bureau.

== History and operations ==
The foundation was founded in 2004 by Nancy Lindholm (formerly Nancy O'Hagan), who was a neuroendocrine cancer patient. It is located in Quincy, MA. On November 10, 2010, the foundation celebrated the first annual Worldwide Neuroendocrine Tumor (NET) Cancer Awareness Day by launching their new website, which provides comprehensive information for family and friends. From time to time the foundation makes grants available jointly with NANETS (the North American Neuroendocrine Tumor Society) and ERF (The Education and Research Foundation for Nuclear Medicine and Molecular Imaging). On other occasions, the foundation acts in conjunction with other grant providers or as the sole grant provider. In 2015, the organization officially changed its name to the Neuroendocrine Tumor Research Foundation and its website to www.netrf.org.

== Mission ==
The mission of NETRF is to fund research to discover cures and more effective treatments for neuroendocrine cancers which affect approximately 248,000 patients in the United States. The specific objectives and purposes of the foundation are to support researchers and scientists who are studying the causes of neuroendocrine cancers, developing treatments; and to educate patients and caregivers about research, treatments, and how to live better with the disease. According to an article in the Cancer Network, NETRF is the largest global funder of this type of research. To date, they have funded over $42 million in research since their beginning in 2005 across 76 institutions in 17 countries. The organization also produces its own educational podcast, Netwise.
