= Johannes Kohtz =

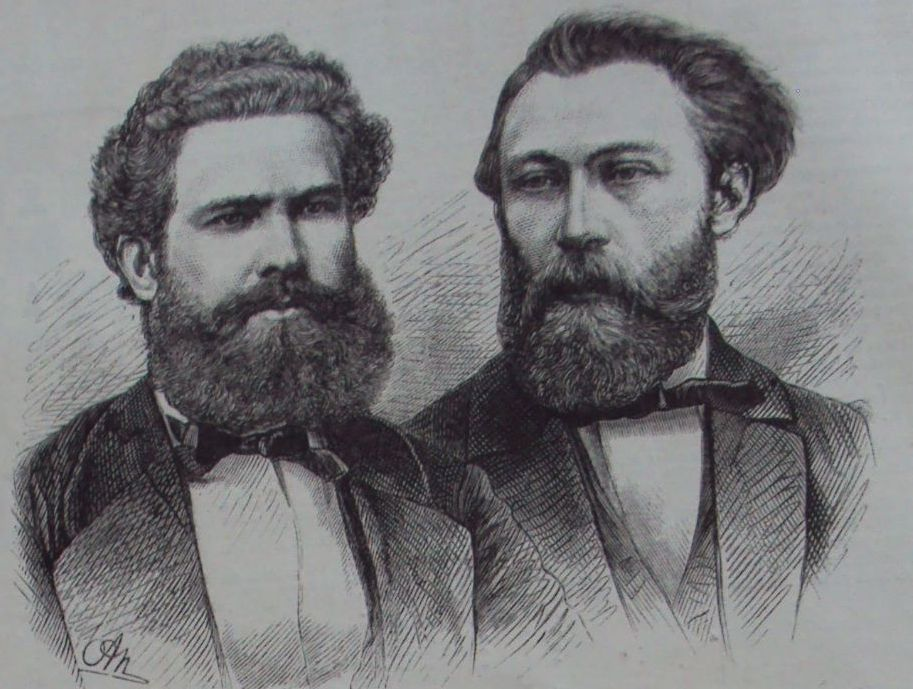
Johannes Kohtz

Johannes Kohtz (July 18, 1843 in Elbing – October 5, 1918) was a German chess composer and together with Carl Kockelkorn one of the founders of the logical school.

== Kohtz and Kockelkorn ==
Johannes Kohtz moved with his parents to Cologne where he met Carl Kockelkorn. When they were still pupils they engaged in chess composition. When both were 17 years old, Wilhelm Kufferath allowed them to publish their first compositions in the Sonntagsblätter für Schachfreunde (lit.: Sunday papers for chess friends). Kohtz and Kockelkorn were quite fond of Philipp Klett's problems.

In their views of chess composition, Kohtz and Kockelkorn harmonized so much that after a short while they decided to publish their problems only as co-productions. After being confronted with rumors that problems by only one of them would also be published as co-productions, Johannes Kohtz wrote 1870 in the Schachzeitung that on every composition both sat together on the chessboard.

Half a year after Arthur Gehlert attacked the Altdeutsche Schule (lit.: old German school), Kohtz and Kockelkorn published their book Das Indische Problem (The Indian Problem). This led to arguments with Johann Berger who founded the Altdeutsche Schule. While Kohtz wrote a correspondence that was published in Deutsches Wochenschach, Berger replied in the Deutsche Schachzeitung. Kohtz had better reasons for his views on chess composition so he won the correspondence — which was broken off by the start of the First World War — and thereby led to the replacement of the Altdeutsche Schule by the Logical School.

Even after the death of his close friend Kockelkorn on July 16, 1914, Kohtz still published his problems under both authors names. There was a problem with the title Eine Schwalbe, which was published in 1911 and had given its name to the later founded German composers' association Die Schwalbe (see there for the problem).

== Private Matters ==
Johannes Kohtz studied in Berlin and Karlsruhe. He worked as a chief engineer in a factory for railroad cars in Elbing and Königsberg. Since 1901 he lived as a pensioner in Dresden, where he also met Arthur Gehlert.

== Sources ==
- Herbert Grasemann: Eines Reverends Einfall, der Geschichte machte (reprint of articles from Deutsche Schachblätter). p. 16-17
