= Hilton Als =

American writer and theater critic (born 1960)

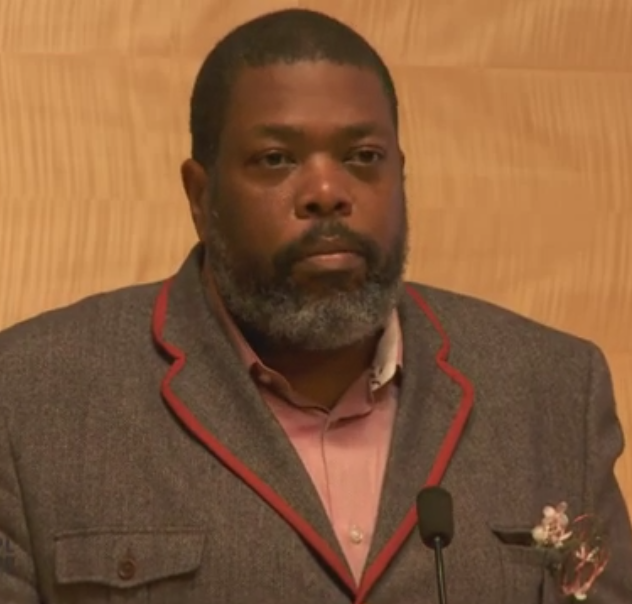
- Reading at the San Francisco Public Library in 2014
- Born: 1960 (age 65–66); New York City, U.S.
- Education: Columbia University
- Occupations: Writer; critic
- Writing career
- Genre: Theatre criticism
- Notable awards: Pulitzer Prize for Criticism; National Book Critics Circle Award; Windham–Campbell Literature Prizes

Hilton Als (born 1960) is an American writer and theater critic. He is a staff writer and theater critic for The New Yorker, for which he won the 2017 Pulitzer Prize for Criticism. He received a Windham–Campbell Literature Prize in 2016, and his books include The Women (1996) and White Girls (2013). Als is a teaching professor at the University of California, Berkeley and an associate professor of writing at Columbia University. He is a former staff writer for The Village Voice and former editor-at-large at Vibe.

== Background and career ==
Hilton Als was born in New York City, with roots in Barbados. Raised in Brownsville, Brooklyn, he has four older sisters and one younger brother. He studied toward a bachelor's in art history from Columbia University.

His 1996 book The Women focuses on his mother (who raised him in Brooklyn), Dorothy Dean, and Owen Dodson, who was a mentor and lover of Als. In the book, Als explores his identification of the confluence of his ethnicity, gender and sexuality, moving from identifying as a "Negress" and then an "Auntie Man", a Barbadian term for homosexuals. His 2013 book White Girls continued to explore race, gender, identity in a series of essays about everything from the AIDS epidemic to Richard Pryor's life and work.

Als received a Guggenheim fellowship in 2000 for creative writing and the 2002–03 George Jean Nathan Award for Dramatic Criticism. In 2004 he won the Berlin Prize of the American Academy in Berlin, which provided him half a year of free working and studying in Berlin. In addition to Columbia, he has taught at Smith College, Wellesley College, Wesleyan University, and Yale University, and his work has also appeared in The Nation, The Believer, and the New York Review of Books.

In 2017, he was awarded the Pulitzer Prize for Criticism: "For bold and original reviews that strove to put stage dramas within a real-world cultural context, particularly the shifting landscape of gender, sexuality and race." The Guardian wrote about him a year later: "Since winning his Pulitzer prize for criticism, Hilton Als has risen more visibly to the role of public intellectual, one that he plays particularly well."

As an art curator, Als has been responsible for exhibitions including the group show Forces in Nature (featuring work by such artists as Njideka Akunyili Crosby, Peter Doig, Chris Ofili, Celia Paul, Tal R, Sarah Sze, Kara Walker, and Francesca Woodman) in 2015, and an exhibition of work from the Manhattan years of portraitist Alice Neel, entitled Alice Neel, Uptown, at David Zwirner Gallery in New York City and Victoria Miro Gallery in London (May 18 – July 29, 2017).

In June 2020, Als was named an inaugural Presidential Visiting Scholar at Princeton University for the 2020–2021 academic year.

In 2024, Als guest curated This Morning, This Evening, So Soon: James Baldwin and the Voices of Queer Resistance, at the National Portrait Gallery; the exhibit included works of by Beauford Delaney, Bernard Gotfryd, and Faith Ringgold among others.

== Awards and honors ==
- 2013 National Book Critics Circle Award (Criticism) shortlist for White Girls
- 2016 Windham–Campbell Literature Prize (Nonfiction)
- 2017 Pulitzer Prize for Criticism
- 2017 Langston Hughes Medal, City College of New York
- 2018 Honorary doctorate, The New School
- 2020 Queerty Pride50 honoree
- 2024 Honorary doctorate, Syracuse University

== Bibliography ==
- The Women. New York: Farrar, Straus & Giroux. 1996. ISBN 978-0-374-52529-3.
- "GWTW". In Allen, James, ed. (2000). Without Sanctuary: Lynching Photography in America. Santa Fe, New Mexico: Twin Palms Publishers. pp. 38–45. ISBN 978-0-944092-69-9.
- Sills, Vaughn (2010). Places for the Spirit: Traditional African American Gardens. Foreword. San Antonio: Trinity University Press. ISBN 978-1-59534-064-1.
- White Girls. San Francisco: McSweeney's. 2013. ISBN 978-1-940450-25-4.
- Opie, Catherine (2015). 700 Nimes Road. Contributor. New York: Prestel Publishing. ISBN 978-3-7913-5425-5.
- Als, Hilton (2014). Celia Paul. London: Victoria Miro.
- Celia Paul and Hilton Als. Desdemona for Celia by Hilton. "Published by Victoria Miro 2016 to coincide with the exhibition Celia Paul 16 September — 29 October 2016".
- My Pinup: A Paean to Prince. New York: New Directions. 2022. ISBN 978-0-8112-3449-8.
- Joan Didion: What She Means. New York: DelMonico Books. 2022. ISBN 978-1-63681-057-7. (Companion book to the Hammer Museum exhibition of the same name)

== See also ==
- LGBTQ culture in New York City
- List of LGBTQ writers
- List of LGBTQ people from New York City
