= Carl Kockelkorn =

German chess composer

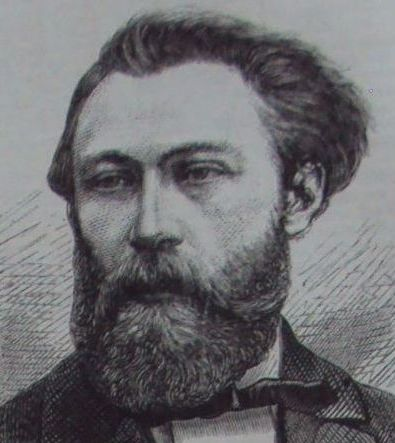
Carl Kockelkorn

Carl Kockelkorn (November 26, 1843 in Cologne – July 16, 1914 in Cologne) was a German chess composer. Together with Johannes Kohtz he founded the logical school of chess compositions.

His problems were published as coproductions with Johannes Kohtz. For further information, see Johannes Kohtz#Kohtz and Kockelkorn.

In his early years he called himself Kannengießer after the name of his stepfather. Kockelkorn worked as a private tutor in Cologne.

== Sources ==
- Herbert Grasemann: Eines Reverends Einfall, der Geschichte machte (reprint of articles from Deutsche Schachblätter). p. 16-17
