= Will Schwalbe =

American writer and businessman

- Born: July 13, 1962 (age 63)
- Citizenship: American
- Occupations: CEO of Cookstr; author; entrepreneur

William Schwalbe (born July 13, 1962) is an American writer and businessman based in New York City. He is the author of three books, and the former editor-in-chief of Hyperion Books. In 2008, he founded the recipe website Cookstr, which was acquired by Macmillan Publishing in 2014, where he is an executive vice president.

His first book, SEND: Why People Email So Badly and How to Do It Better, was co-written with David Shipley, and was published by Penguin Random House in 2010. The book was reviewed by Dave Barry in The New York Times, became a business bestseller and was included in an interview with Schwalbe on The Colbert Report in June 2007.

The End of Your Life Book Club, which described Schwalbe's relationship with his mother Mary Anne Schwalbe through books before her death, was published by Knopf in 2012, and spent more than four months on the New York Times Bestseller List. It was widely reviewed by outlets such as The New York Times, The Boston Globe, USA Today, Chicago Reader, The New Yorker, Bookpage, and Entertainment Weekly.

As a journalist, he has written for various publications, including The New York Times and South China Morning Post.

Books for Living was published in December 2016 by Knopf, and consists of essays about 26 different books that affected the author's life. The Boston Globe described it as a "natural follow-on" to his previous book. Among the books described by Schwalbe include, Homer's The Odyssey, Herman Melville's Bartleby the Scrivener, E. B. White's Stuart Little and Paula Hawkins' The Girl on the Train.

His sister, Nina Schwalbe, is an American public health researcher.

== Bibliography ==
- SEND: Why People Email So Badly and How to Do It Better (2010)
- The End of Your Life Book Club (2012)
- Books for Living (2016)
- We Should Not Be Friends: The Story of a Friendship (2023)
