= Women's Refugee Commission =

U.S. nonprofit organization

- Founded: 1989
- Type: NGO
- Location: New York; Washington, D.C.; Geneva
- Website: www.womensrefugeecommission.org

The Women's Refugee Commission is a 501(c)(3) non-governmental organization that aims to improve the lives and protect the rights of women, children, and youth displaced by conflict or crisis. Established in 1989 by Norwegian Actress and film Director Liv Ullmann and others, it was part of the International Rescue Committee (IRC) until 2014.

The organization seeks to identify problems that affect displaced women, children, and youth. These include gaps in lifesaving reproductive health care, lack of dignified livelihoods for refugees, and, in the United States, the treatment of people seeking asylum. The Women's Refugee Commission documents practices, proposes solutions, and develops tools to improve the way humanitarian assistance is delivered in refugee settings. On Capitol Hill, at the United Nations as well as with humanitarian organizations, governments and donors, the organization pushes for improvements in refugee policy and practice.

== History ==
The organization was founded in 1989 by actress Liv Ullmann, Catherine O'Neill, and several others after they visited Pakistan, Thailand, and other nations. Their experience in these nations led them to believe a formal organization was needed to provide assistance to women and families displaced by circumstances such as war. At the time, they observed, "the system was run by men and geared to caring for the men." They created the Women's Commission for Refugee Women and Children, foreseeing the organization as operating under the umbrella of the International Rescue Committee.

== Programs ==
=== Economic empowerment and self-reliance ===
The Women's Refugee Commission works to ensure that humanitarian programs provide refugee women and youth access to education and cash assistance opportunities, and to help them safely earn a living. This, in turn, increases refugees' self-reliance and resilience.

=== Gender and social inclusion ===
The Women's Refugee Commission promotes the full inclusion of traditionally marginalized groups, such as refugee women, people with disabilities, the LGBTQI community, and adolescent girls in identifying solutions and designing programs that meet their unique needs and build upon their capacities.

=== Rights and justice ===
The Women's Refugee Commission holds governments accountable for their obligation with respect to women's and children's rights so they can find safety, access justice, and rebuild their lives.

=== Sexual and reproductive health ===
The Women's Refugee Commission works to protect all refugees' reproductive rights and to ensure that lifesaving health services are available from the onset of an emergency through recovery.

=== Sexual and gender-based violence ===
The Women's Refugee Commission works to prevent and respond to sexual and gender-based violence by helping to ensure access to critical services for refugees such as education, work opportunities, and sexual and reproductive health care. It partners and collaborates with local organizations and the international humanitarian community to improve safety and services.

=== Disability inclusion ===
The Women's Refugee Commission identifies what works for refugee women, children, and youth with disabilities. It advocates for their inclusion across all humanitarian programs and services; strengthens the leadership of organizations of women with disabilities in humanitarian action; informs and influences resilience-based approaches in humanitarian settings; and improves accountability.

=== Adolescent girls ===
The Women's Refugee Commission addresses the critical needs of adolescent girls in crisis settings to ensure that they stay safe and make positive changes in their lives. It identifies and promotes ways that girls can protect themselves, access health care, complete school, build leadership skills and be seen as a valued part of their families and communities.

=== Women, peace and security ===
The Women's Refugee Commission works for full implementation of the Women, Peace and Security agenda at the UN. It undertakes advocacy to ensure that the UN and its members support and recognize the work of women, who are the linchpins of their communities and whose contributions are key to putting their countries back on the path to peace and security.

== Reference ==
- Women's Refugee Commission
- International Rescue Committee
- "Norse Goddess." The New Yorker, Jan. 4, 2010
- Tapping the Potential of Displaced Youth
