= Jordan Peterson =

Canadian psychologist (born 1962)

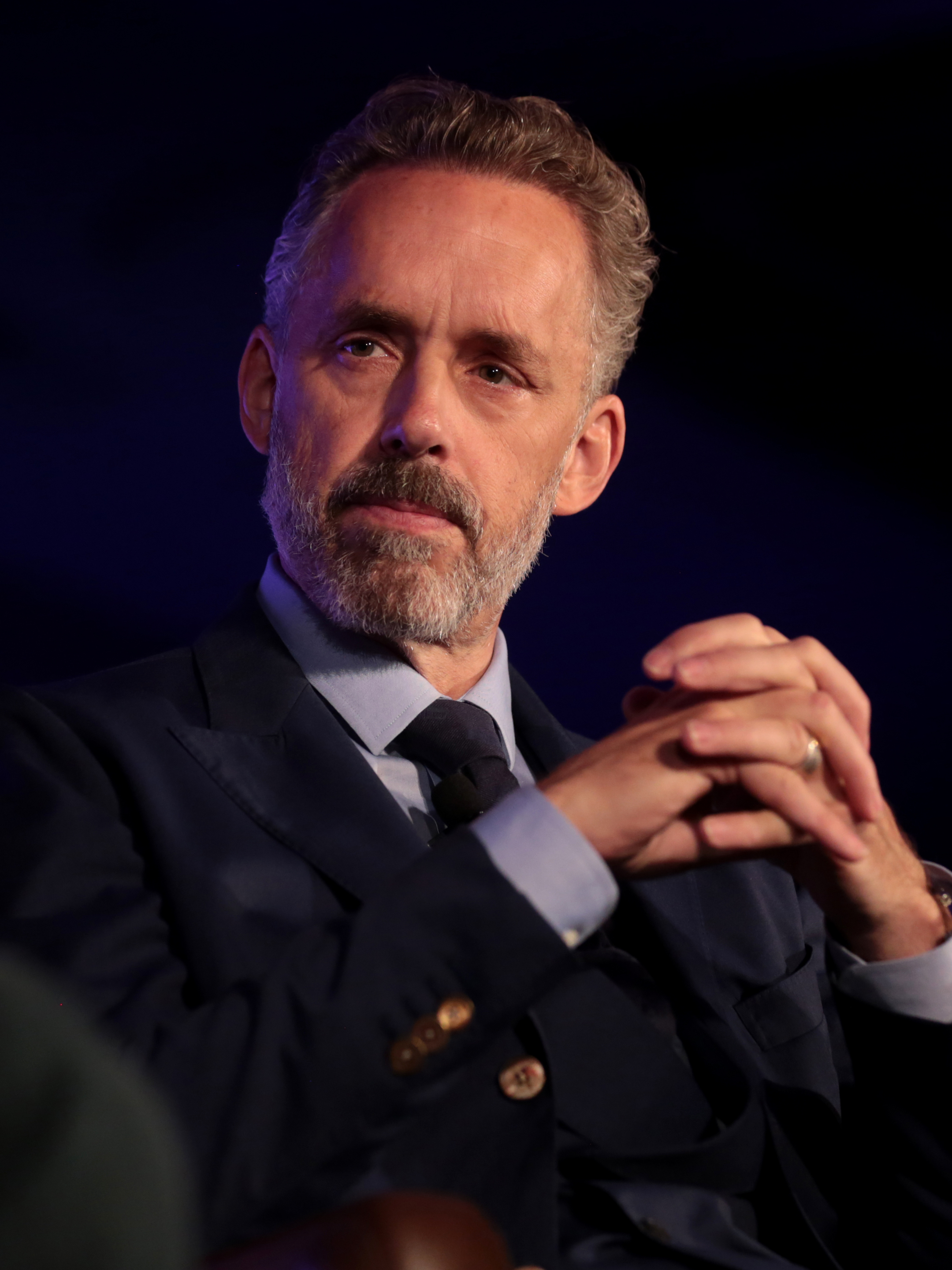
- Peterson in 2018
- Born: Jordan Bernt Peterson; 12 June 1962 (age 64); Edmonton, Alberta, Canada
- Occupations: Clinical psychologist; author; internet personality
- Spouse: Tammy Roberts (m. 1989)
- Children: 2
- Relatives: Jim Keller (brother-in-law)

Academic background
- Education: University of Alberta (BA, BA); McGill University (PhD)
- Thesis: Potential Psychological Markers for the Predisposition to Alcoholism (1990)
- Doctoral advisor: Robert O. Pihl
- Influences: Dostoevsky; Jung; Neumann; Nietzsche; Orwell; Piaget; Solzhenitsyn

Academic work
- Discipline: Clinical psychology
- Institutions: McGill University; Harvard University; University of Toronto; Ralston College
- Notable works: Maps of Meaning (1999); 12 Rules for Life (2018)
- Influenced: Gregg Hurwitz
- Website: jordanbpeterson.com

Jordan Bernt Peterson (born 12 June 1962) is a Canadian psychologist, author, and media commentator. He received widespread attention in the late 2010s for his views on cultural and political issues. Often described as conservative, Peterson self-identifies as a classical liberal and traditionalist.

Born and raised in Alberta, he graduated from the University of Alberta with undergraduate degrees in political science and psychology and earned his PhD in clinical psychology from McGill University. After researching and teaching at Harvard University, he returned to Canada in 1998 and became a professor of psychology at the University of Toronto. In 1999, he published his first book, Maps of Meaning: The Architecture of Belief, which became the basis for many of his subsequent lectures. The book combined psychology, mythology, religion, literature, philosophy and neuroscience to analyze systems of belief and meaning.

In 2016, Peterson released a series of videos on YouTube criticizing a proposed federal law, Bill C-16, that would prohibit discrimination against gender identity and expression. Peterson argued that the bill would make the use of certain gender pronouns compelled speech, and related this argument to a general critique of "political correctness" and identity politics, receiving significant media coverage and attracting both support and criticism. The bill became law in 2017. Peterson has been widely criticized by climate scientists for denying the scientific consensus on climate change and giving a platform to climate-change deniers.

In 2018, he paused both his clinical practice and teaching duties and published his second book, 12 Rules for Life: An Antidote to Chaos. Promoted with a world tour, it became a bestseller in several countries. In 2019 and 2020, Peterson suffered health issues related to benzodiazepine dependence. In 2021, he published his third book, Beyond Order: 12 More Rules for Life, resigned from the University of Toronto, and returned to podcasting. In 2022, Peterson became chancellor of the newly launched Ralston College, a private, unaccredited, liberal arts college in Savannah, Georgia, United States. In 2025, Peterson suffered chronic inflammatory response syndrome, causing his hospitalization for five months. Affected by health problems since attaining prominence, Peterson has been under assisted care at his residence and remained out of public life since June 2025. His various lectures and conversations, available mainly on YouTube and podcasts, have garnered millions of views.

== Early life and education ==
Jordan Bernt Peterson was born on 12 June 1962 in Edmonton, Alberta. He is the oldest of three siblings, with a younger sister and a younger brother, born to Walter (1937–2024) and Beverley Peterson (1939–2024). Beverley was a librarian at the Fairview campus of Grande Prairie Regional College, and Walter was a school teacher of Norwegian ancestry. Peterson grew up in a mildly Christian household.

In junior high school, Peterson became friends with Rachel Notley and her family. Notley became leader of the Alberta New Democratic Party and the 17th premier of Alberta. Peterson was a member of the New Democratic Party (NDP) from ages 13 to 18. As a teenager, Peterson decided that "religion was for the ignorant, weak and superstitious" and hoped for a left-wing revolution, a hope that lasted until he met left-wing activists in college.

After graduating from Fairview High School in Fairview, Alberta, in 1979, Peterson entered Grande Prairie Regional College to study political science and English literature, studying to be a corporate lawyer. During this time he read The Road to Wigan Pier by George Orwell, which he said significantly affected his educational focus and worldview. He later transferred to the University of Alberta, where he completed his Bachelor of Arts (B.A.) in political science in 1982. Afterwards, he took a year off to visit Europe, where he began studying the psychological origins of the Cold War; 20th-century European totalitarianism; and the works of Carl Jung, Friedrich Nietzsche, Aleksandr Solzhenitsyn, and Fyodor Dostoevsky.

Peterson then returned to the University of Alberta and received a second degree, a B.A. in psychology, in 1984. In 1985, he moved to Montreal to attend McGill University, where he earned his Ph.D. in clinical psychology under the supervision of Robert O. Pihl in 1991, and remained as a post-doctoral fellow at McGill's Douglas Hospital until June 1993, working with Pihl and Maurice Dongier. While at McGill University and the Douglas Hospital, Peterson conducted research into familial alcoholism and its associated psychopathologies, such as childhood and adolescent aggression and hyperactive behaviour.

== Psychology ==
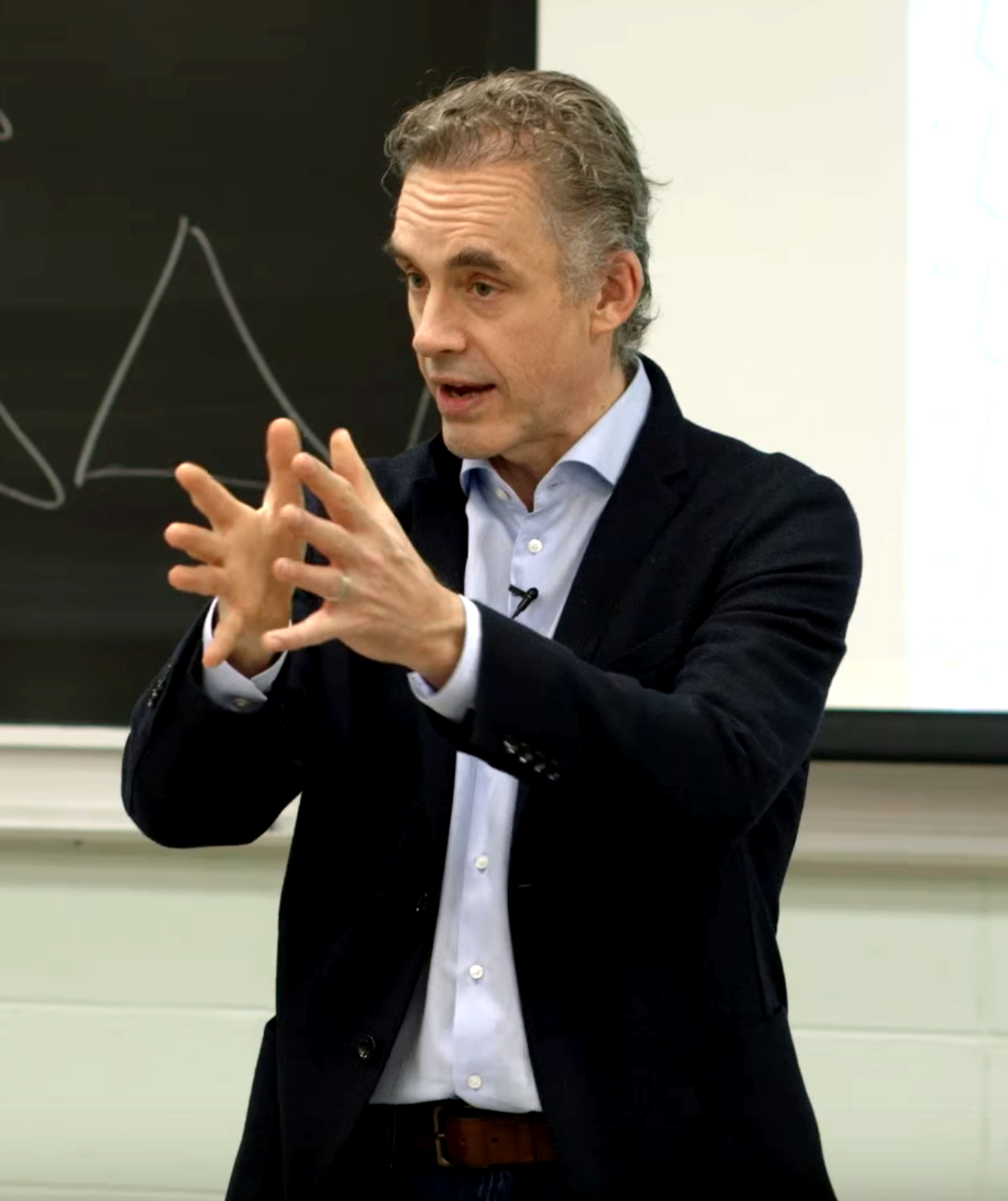
Peterson at the University of Toronto in March 2017

From July 1993 to June 1998, Peterson lived in Arlington, Massachusetts, while teaching and conducting research at Harvard University, where he was hired as an assistant professor in the psychology department. Author Gregg Hurwitz, a former student of Peterson's at Harvard, has cited Peterson as an inspiration of his, and psychologist Shelley Carson, former PhD student and now professor at Harvard, recalled that Peterson's lectures had "something akin to a cult following", stating, "I remember students crying on the last day of class because they wouldn't get to hear him anymore." Following his position at Harvard, Peterson returned to Canada in 1998 to become a full professor at the University of Toronto.

Peterson's areas of interest span many subdisciplines, most notably psychopharmacology, the psychology of religion, personality psychology, and political psychology. For most of his career, Peterson maintained a clinical practice, seeing about 20 people a week. He has been active on social media, and in September 2016 he released a series of videos in which he criticized Bill C-16. As a result of new projects, he decided to put the clinical practice on hold in 2017, and temporarily stopped teaching as of 2018.

In February 2018, Peterson entered into an agreement with the College of Psychologists of Ontario (CPO) after a professional misconduct complaint about his communication and the boundaries he sets with his patients. The college did not consider a full disciplinary hearing necessary and accepted Peterson entering into a three-month undertaking to work on prioritizing his practice and improving his patient communications. Peterson had no prior disciplinary punishments or restrictions on his clinical practice. In March 2020, the CPO's Inquiries, Complaints and Reports Committee (ICRC) investigated statements made by Peterson which were alleged to be "transphobic, sexist, racist" and "not in keeping with any clinical understanding of mental health". They concluded their investigation without making any orders but expressed concern that "the manner and tone in which Dr. Peterson espouses his public statements may reflect poorly on the profession of psychology" and advised him to "offer [his] opinions and comments in a respectful tone in order to avoid a negative perception toward the profession of psychology."

In late 2021, Peterson retired from the University of Toronto, becoming professor emeritus. In May 2022, he became chancellor of the newly launched Ralston College, an unaccredited liberal arts education project. Along with Baroness Stroud and John Anderson, Peterson founded the Alliance for Responsible Citizenship in June 2023. He hosted its international conference in October of that year.

In November 2022, the ICRC ordered Peterson to complete a specified continuing education or remedial program regarding professionalism in public statements. The ICRC concluded that some of the language used in his public statements between January and June 2022 "may be reasonably regarded by members of the profession as disgraceful, dishonourable and/or unprofessional" and that his statements "posed moderate risk of harm to the public" by "undermining public trust in the profession of psychology". They also concluded that he "appeared to be engaging in degrading comments about a former client and making demeaning jokes on the Joe Rogan experience".

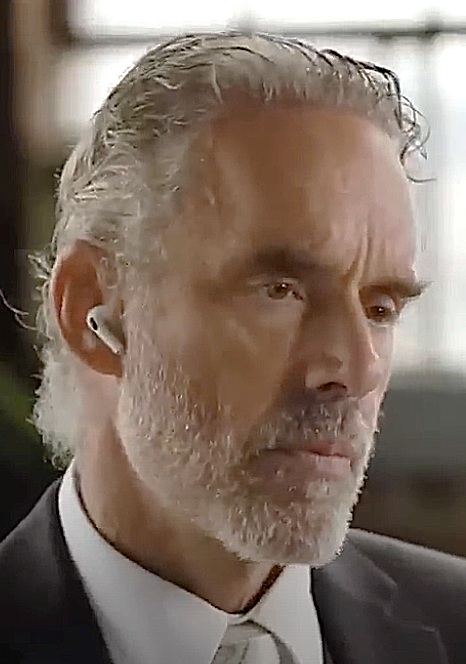
Peterson during a podcast interview in August 2023

Peterson denied any wrongdoing and filed for judicial review. Peterson's appeal was reviewed in August 2023 by a panel of three judges of the Ontario Divisional Court, who unanimously upheld the college's initial decision, concluding that the ICRC's reasoning in their 2022 decision was "transparent, intelligible, justifiable, and reasonable" and ordered Peterson to pay the CPO $25,000 in legal costs. The decision was upheld on appeal to the Court of Appeal for Ontario in January 2024. In August 2024, the Supreme Court of Canada declined to hear an appeal from the appeal court decision, closing Peterson's legal options for resisting the social media training.

In October 2024, Canadian prime minister Justin Trudeau said under oath that Peterson was funded by Russian state-owned media outlet RT. In response, Peterson said he considered legal action but subsequently noted that success was "unlikely" and did not file suit.

== Social media ==
Jordan B Peterson
- Former profile picture used on Peterson's channels
- Years active: 2013–present

YouTube information
- Channels: Jordan B Peterson; Jordan B Peterson Clips
- Genres: Psychology and religion lectures, interviews on science, personal growth, culture
- Subscribers: 8.8 million (Jordan B Peterson); 1.9 million (Jordan B Peterson Clips)
- Views: 1 billion (Jordan B Peterson); 509 million (Jordan B Peterson Clips)
- Last updated: 24 December 2025

=== YouTube ===
In 2013, Peterson registered a YouTube channel named JordanPetersonVideos, and immediately began uploading recordings of lectures and interviews. From 2014, uploads include recordings from two of his classes at University of Toronto ("Personality and Its Transformations" and "Maps of Meaning: The Architecture of Belief"). In March 2016, after three years of basic uploading of course videos, Peterson announced an interest to clean existing content and improve future content. The channel gathered more than 1.8 million subscribers and his videos received more than 65 million views as of August 2018.

=== Twitter ===
On 29 June 2022, Peterson's Twitter account was suspended under the site's "hateful conduct policy" after posting a tweet misgendering and deadnaming transgender actor Elliot Page, calling his physician "a criminal". Peterson said he was notified that he would be required to delete the tweet in order to restore access to his account, which he said he "would rather die than do". YouTube has demonetized two of Peterson's videos, one about his Twitter suspension and another video where he said gender-affirming care was "Nazi medical experiment-level wrong." Peterson's Twitter account was restored in November 2022 after Elon Musk acquired the company.

=== Other media ===
From early 2017, funding for Peterson's projects dramatically increased through his use of Patreon. Peterson hired a production team to film his 2017 psychology lectures at the University of Toronto. Donations received range from $1,000 per month in August 2016 to $14,000 by January 2017; more than $50,000 by July 2017; and over $80,000 by May 2018. With this funding, a number of projects and lecture series were proposed. However, regular donations for the YouTube channel were interrupted in January 2019, when Peterson deleted his Patreon account in public protest of the platform's controversial banning of antifeminist content creator Carl Benjamin (also known as Sargon of Akkad) for using racist language on YouTube.

Following that, Peterson and Dave Rubin announced the creation of a new, free speech–oriented social networking and crowdfunding platform. This alternative had a limited release under the name Thinkspot later in 2019 and has remained in beta testing as of December 2019, receiving largely negative reviews from media critics. In 2024, he launched the Peterson Academy, an online education platform offering pre-recorded lectures.

Peterson has appeared on many podcasts, conversational series, as well as other online shows. In December 2016, Peterson started The Jordan B. Peterson Podcast. In March 2019, the podcast joined the Westwood One network with Peterson's daughter as a co-host on some episodes. Peterson defended engineer James Damore after he was fired from Google for writing an internal memo titled "Google's Ideological Echo Chamber". In January 2022, Peterson was interviewed by Joe Rogan on The Joe Rogan Experience. During the interview, Peterson said that the Earth's climate is too complicated to accurately model. Several climate scientists criticized Peterson, saying that he misunderstood climate modelling. In June 2022, Peterson signed a deal with the news company The Daily Wire, which includes the distribution rights to Peterson's video and podcast library. Peterson will also produce bonus content and specials featuring guests for the video on demand platform DailyWire+.

=== Biblical lectures ===
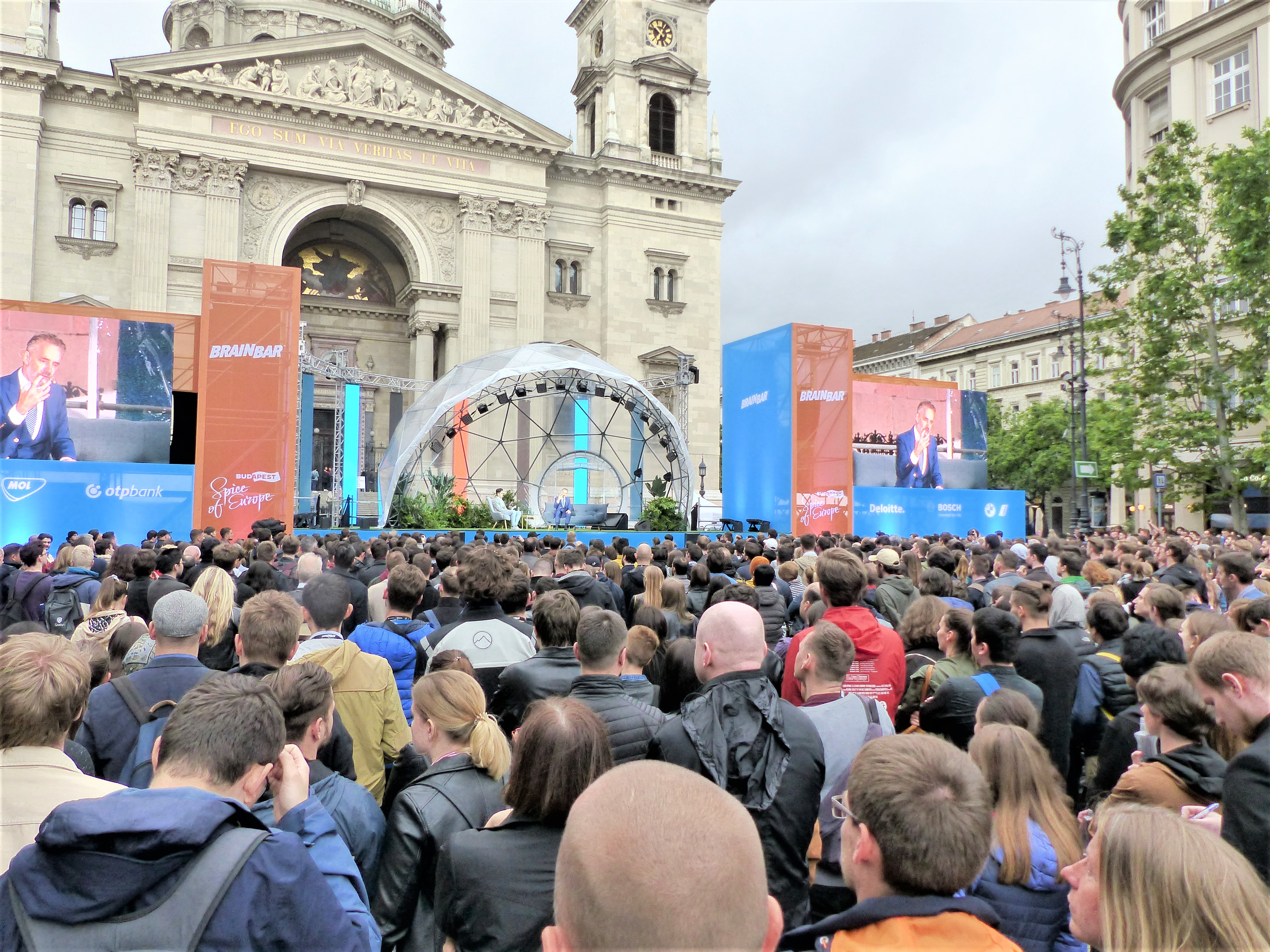
Peterson speaking in front of St. Stephen's Basilica, Budapest, Hungary, in May 2019

In May 2017, Peterson began The Psychological Significance of the Biblical Stories, a series of live theatre lectures, also published as podcasts, in which he analyzes archetypal narratives in the Book of Genesis as patterns of behaviour ostensibly vital for personal, social and cultural stability. A second series of lectures on the Book of Exodus released on DailyWire+ in November 2022, and another series on the Book of Proverbs has been announced.

In March 2019, Cambridge University rescinded a visiting fellowship invitation to Peterson. He had previously said the fellowship would give him an "opportunity to talk to religious experts of all types for a couple of months," and that the new lectures would have been on the Book of Exodus. A spokesperson for the university said there was no place for anyone who could not uphold the inclusive environment of the university. Vice-Chancellor Stephen Toope explained that a photograph of Peterson with his arm around a man wearing a shirt reading "I'm a proud Islamophobe" led the faculty to the rescindment due to a conflict between Peterson's "casual endorsement by association" and the school's commitment to interfaith dialogue.

The Cambridge University Students' Union released a statement of relief, considering the invitation "a political act to ... legitimise figures such as Peterson" and that his work and views are not "representative of the student body." Peterson said that the photograph was one of 30,000 taken with his fans in the previous 15 months, called the university's decision a "deeply unfortunate ... error of judgement", and said that the Divinity Faculty had submitted to an "ill-informed, ignorant and ideologically-addled mob" in rescinding the invitation. Peterson also said that he would stop posing for photographs with fans wearing "provocative political garb, given that the fallout can be used by those who are not fond of me to capitalise on the opportunity the photos provide, particularly in isolation and context-free."

== Political views ==
Peterson has characterized himself politically as a classical liberal and as a traditionalist. He has stated that he is commonly mistaken as right-wing, stating that he supports universal healthcare, redistribution of wealth towards the poor, and the decriminalization of drugs.

Psychologist Daniel Burston cites Peterson's "tendency to idealize the past" and "fervent embrace of radical individualism" as evidence for his conservatism. Peterson features prominently in conservative media, is commonly referred to as a conservative by journalists, and published "A Conservative Manifesto" in 2023. He has been described as "conservative-leaning" by The New York Times and as an "aspiring conservative thought leader" by The Washington Post. Conservative philosopher Yoram Hazony writes in The Wall Street Journal that "The startling success of [Peterson's] elevated arguments for the importance of order has made him the most significant conservative thinker to appear in the English-speaking world in a generation." Libertarian journalist Cathy Young commented in the Los Angeles Times:

Peterson's ideas are a mixed bag [...] But you wouldn't know this from reading Peterson's critics, who generally cast him as a far-right boogeyman riding the wave of a misogynistic backlash.

=== Political correctness ===
Peterson asserts that universities are largely responsible for a wave of "political correctness" that has appeared in North America and Europe, saying that he had watched the rise of political correctness on campuses since the early 1990s. Peterson believes the humanities have become corrupt and less reliant on science and emphasized sociology, a social science, because he thinks that sociologists believe science is oppressive and Eurocentric. He contends that "proper culture" and western civilization are being undermined by "post-modernism and neo-Marxism".

Peterson's critiques of political correctness range over issues such as postmodernism, postmodern feminism, white privilege, cultural appropriation, and environmentalism. His social media presence has magnified the impact of these views; Simona Chiose of The Globe and Mail wrote that "few University of Toronto professors in the humanities and social sciences have enjoyed the global name recognition Prof. Peterson has won". Writing in the National Post, Chris Selley said that Peterson's opponents had "underestimated the fury being inspired by modern preoccupations like white privilege and cultural appropriation, and by the marginalization, shouting down or outright cancellation of other viewpoints in polite society's institutions". Tim Lott stated in The Spectator that Peterson became "an outspoken critic of mainstream academia".

Peterson's views of academic culture have been criticized by other academics such as Daniel Burston.

==== Postmodernism and identity politics ====
Peterson has proposed cutting funding for liberal arts programs throughout Canada, claiming that students were being indoctrinated with "cultural Marxism". He has said that "disciplines like women's studies should be defunded", advising freshman students to avoid subjects such as sociology, anthropology, English literature, ethnic studies, and racial studies, as well as other fields of study that he believes are corrupted by "post-modern neo-Marxists". He has said that these fields propagate cult-like behaviour and safe-spaces. In 2017, he said that he would create a website to reduce enrollment in "postmodern neo-Marxist cult classes by 75 per cent across the West", including women's and ethnic studies, prompting 'alarm' from the University of Toronto Faculty Association for Peterson's plan to "place under surveillance certain kinds of academic content". Peterson did not go on to develop such a website.

In a 2018 interview with Time magazine, Peterson expressed his opposition to identity politics, saying "You don't play racial, ethnic and gender identity games" and argued that it is practiced by both the left and the right: "[t]he left plays them on behalf of the oppressed, let's say, and the right tends to play them on behalf of nationalism and ethnic pride". He goes on to argue that both are equally dangerous and that "the correct game...is one where you focus on your individual life and try to take responsibility for your actions." Burston writes that Peterson's reluctance to criticize racially charged remarks by Donald Trump while freely criticizing the American Left has served to enable Trump's "authoritarian agenda".

In 2017, Peterson did an interview with the Toronto Sun following a public controversy around cultural appropriation in which a senior editor for the CBC tweeted that he would "contribute $100 to an appropriation prize" before a debate about cultural appropriation between journalists, resulting in a public apology by the editor and his reassignment to a lower position. In the interview Peterson claimed that the reaction on social media and events that followed had promoted self-censorship among journalists saying that the "radical mob learned...they can humiliate and take down even journalists that have impeccable reputations and large followings" and that he had "talked to many journalists this week about this issue... they're all engaging in cautious self-censorship". He also argued that censorship makes people deceptive saying that "You start by just not saying things, and you end up by saying things that you know to be untrue."

Peterson has used the terms "cultural Marxism" and "postmodernism" interchangeably to describe the influence of postmodernism on North American humanities departments; he views postmodern philosophy as an offshoot or expression of neo-Marxism. Burston writes that in attributing the decline of the liberal arts solely to the advent of postmodernism and political correctness, Peterson has joined sides with the right in the campus culture wars.

Peterson's arguments about subjects outside his area of expertise, such as postmodernism, gender identity, and Canadian law, have been criticized as "conspiratorial" and "riddled with pseudo-facts" by Dorian Lynskey of The Guardian. Peterson argues that social justice promotes collectivism and sees individuals as "essentially a member of a group" and "not essentially an individual". He also argues that social justice "view[s] the world" as "a battleground between groups of different power". Several writers have associated Peterson with the "intellectual dark web" including journalist Bari Weiss, who included Peterson in the 2018 New York Times article that first popularized the term.

=== Gender and gender expression ===
Peterson has said that there is an ongoing "crisis of masculinity" and "backlash against masculinity" in which the "masculine spirit is under assault". He has said that the Left characterizes the existing societal hierarchy as an "oppressive patriarchy" but "doesn't want to admit that the current hierarchy might be predicated on competence." He has said men without partners are likely to become violent, and that male violence is reduced in societies in which monogamy is a social norm. He has claimed that the rise of Donald Trump and far-right European politicians is due to a negative reaction to a push to "feminize" men, saying that "if men are pushed too hard to feminize they will become more and more interested in harsh, fascist political ideology".

A 2018 Channel 4 News interview with Cathy Newman included a debate over the gender pay gap in which Peterson claimed that a "multivariate analysis of the pay gap indicates that it doesn't exist" and that other factors like generalized differences between the personalities of men and women account for the difference. Newman received criticism for her approach to the interview, including mischaracterizations of some of Peterson's claims, and was the victim of an online harassment campaign following the interview. Channel 4 News reported that it had consulted with security specialists due to "vicious misogynistic abuse, nastiness, and threats" made against Newman. Peterson said that he immediately called on his supporters to "back off" once he became aware of the abuse and denied that the harassment was reflective of "fundamental misogyny".

==== Bill C-16 ====
On 27 September 2016, Peterson released the first installment of a three-part lecture video series, entitled "Professor against political correctness: Part I: Fear and the Law". In the video, he stated that he would not use the preferred gender pronouns of students and faculty, alleging it fell under compelled speech and said that he opposed the Canadian government's Bill C-16 which proposed to add "gender identity or expression" as a prohibited grounds of discrimination under the Canadian Human Rights Act and expand the definitions of promoting genocide and publicly inciting hatred in the hate speech laws in Canada. (Note: The phrase "a prohibited ground of discrimination" means it is illegal to discriminate against an individual or groups of people "on the grounds of" (based on) race, national or ethnic origin, colour, religion, age, sex, sexual orientation, gender identity or expression, etc.)

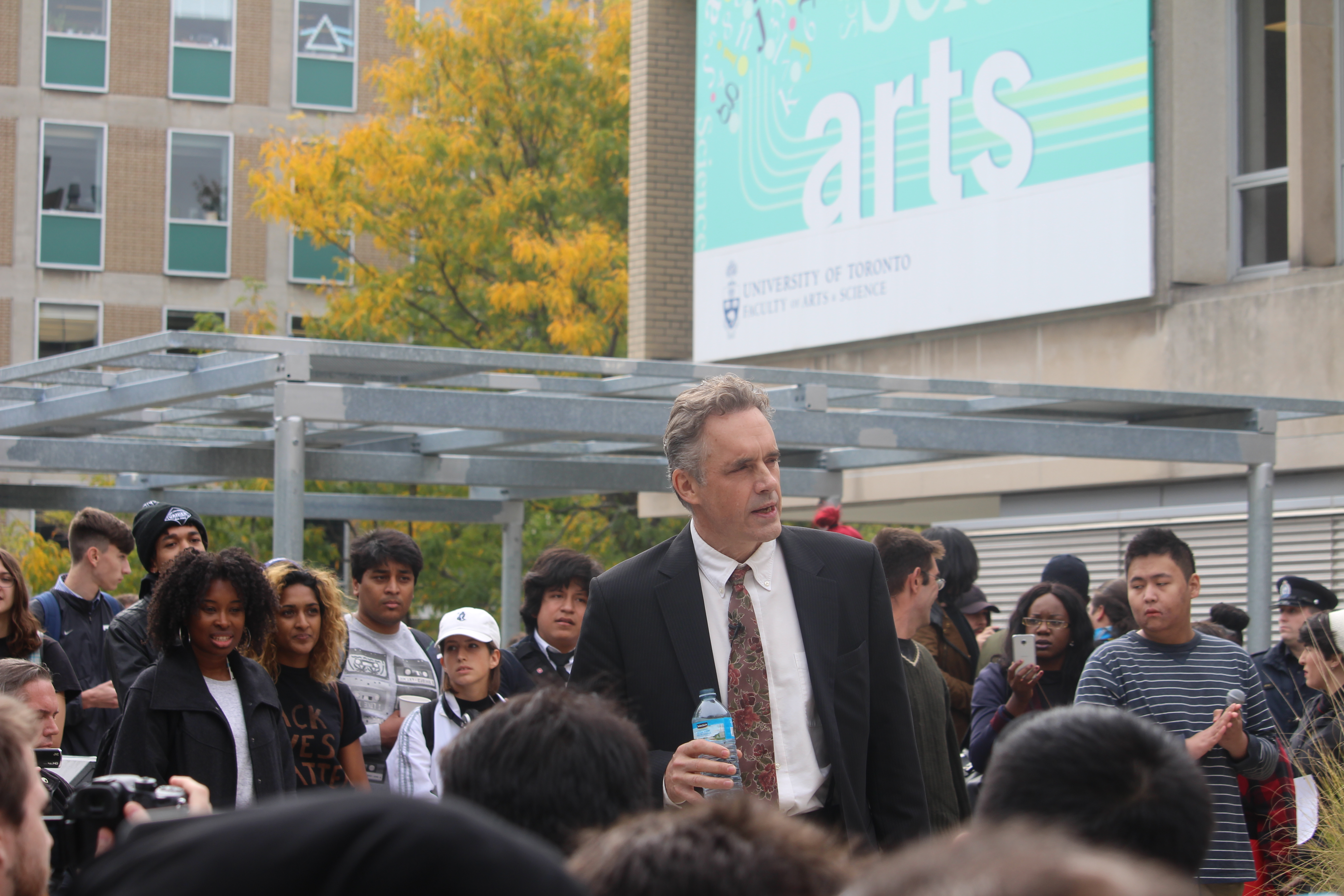
Peterson speaking at a Free Speech Rally in October 2016

Peterson cited free-speech implications in opposition to the bill and falsely said that he could be prosecuted under provincial human-rights laws if he refused to call a transgender student or faculty member by the individual's preferred pronoun. According to law professor Brenda Cossman and others, this interpretation of C-16 is mistaken, and the law does not criminalize misuse of pronouns.

The series of videos drew criticism from transgender rights groups, faculty, and labour unions who condemned Peterson for "helping to foster a climate for hate to thrive" and for "fundamentally mischaracterising" the law. A teach-in and rally was held by members of the trans and non-binary community on campus, which drew "free speech protestors" and far-right political commentator Lauren Southern with Rebel News who spoke at an event on campus along with Peterson.

When asked in September 2016 if he would comply with the request of a student to use a preferred pronoun, Peterson said:

It would depend on how they asked me. […] If I could detect that there was a chip on their shoulder, or that they were [asking me] with political motives, then I would probably say 'no'. […] If I could have a conversation like the one we're having now, I could probably meet them on an equal level.

Two months later, the National Post published an op-ed by Peterson in which he further expressed his opposition to the bill, saying that gender-neutral singular pronouns were "at the vanguard of a post-modern, radical leftist ideology that I detest, and which is, in my professional opinion, frighteningly similar to the Marxist doctrines that killed at least 100 million people in the 20th century."

In February 2017, Maxime Bernier, then candidate for leader of the Conservative Party of Canada, stated that he had shifted his position on Bill C-16, from support to opposition, after meeting with Peterson and discussing it. Peterson's analysis of the bill was also frequently cited by senators who were opposed to its passage. In April 2017, Peterson was denied a Social Sciences and Humanities Research Council (SSHRC) grant for the first time in his career, which he claimed was in retaliation for his statements regarding Bill C-16. However, a media-relations adviser for SSHRC said, "Committees assess only the information contained in the application." In response the far-right Rebel News launched an Indiegogo crowdfunding campaign on Peterson's behalf, raising C$195,000 by its end on 6 May, reportedly equivalent to three years of research funding. In May 2017, as one of 24 witnesses who were invited to speak about the bill, Peterson spoke against Bill C-16 at a Canadian Senate Committee on Legal and Constitutional Affairs hearing.

In November 2017, Lindsay Shepherd, the teaching assistant of a Wilfrid Laurier University first-year communications course, was censured by her professors for showing, during a classroom discussion about pronouns, a segment of The Agenda in which Peterson debates Bill C-16 with another professor. The reasons given for the censure included the clip creating a "toxic climate", being compared to a "speech by Hitler", and being itself in violation of Bill C-16. The censure was later withdrawn and both the professors and the university formally apologized.

In June 2018, Peterson filed a $1.5-million lawsuit against Wilfrid Laurier University, alleging that three staff members of the university had maliciously defamed him by making negative comments about him behind closed doors. In the same month Shepherd filed a lawsuit against the university, the two professors, the third staff member and a student, alleging "harassment, intentional infliction of nervous shock, negligence, and constructive dismissal". By September 2018, Wilfrid Laurier had asked the court to dismiss Peterson's lawsuit, stating that Peterson filed it in an attempt to limit debate on matters of public interest. Laurier commented that "there is inescapable irony in the fact that Peterson...is bringing a claim for the stated purpose of causing academics and administrators to be more circumspect in their words."

Peterson's lawsuit was dismissed by the court on November 7, 2024. Shepherd's lawsuit was dismissed the next day.

=== Climate change ===
Peterson is a climate-change denier and has publicly expressed his disbelief in the scientific consensus on climate change. He has been identified by climate scientists as a "key organizer at the global level for efforts to oppose and delay action on climate change". His videos spreading climate change denialism have been viewed millions of times and include titles such as "The world is not ending", "Unsettled: climate and science" and "The great climate con".

Appearing on The Joe Rogan Experience in 2022, Peterson said that "there is no such thing as climate", that "climate and everything are the same word", denied the accuracy of climate modelling and confused it with weather forecasting, cited Fred Singer, a prominent climate change denier, and falsely asserted that fracking has not polluted water supplies. Professor John Abraham, a climate scientist at the University of St Thomas in Minnesota, referred to the episode as a "word salad of nonsense spoken by people who have no sense when it comes to climate". Michael E. Mann, a professor of Atmospheric Science at Penn State University, said in an interview with The Independent that Peterson's "argument betrays either a total lack of understanding of how science works (or, more likely, a total disdain for his audience and an intention to disinform)".

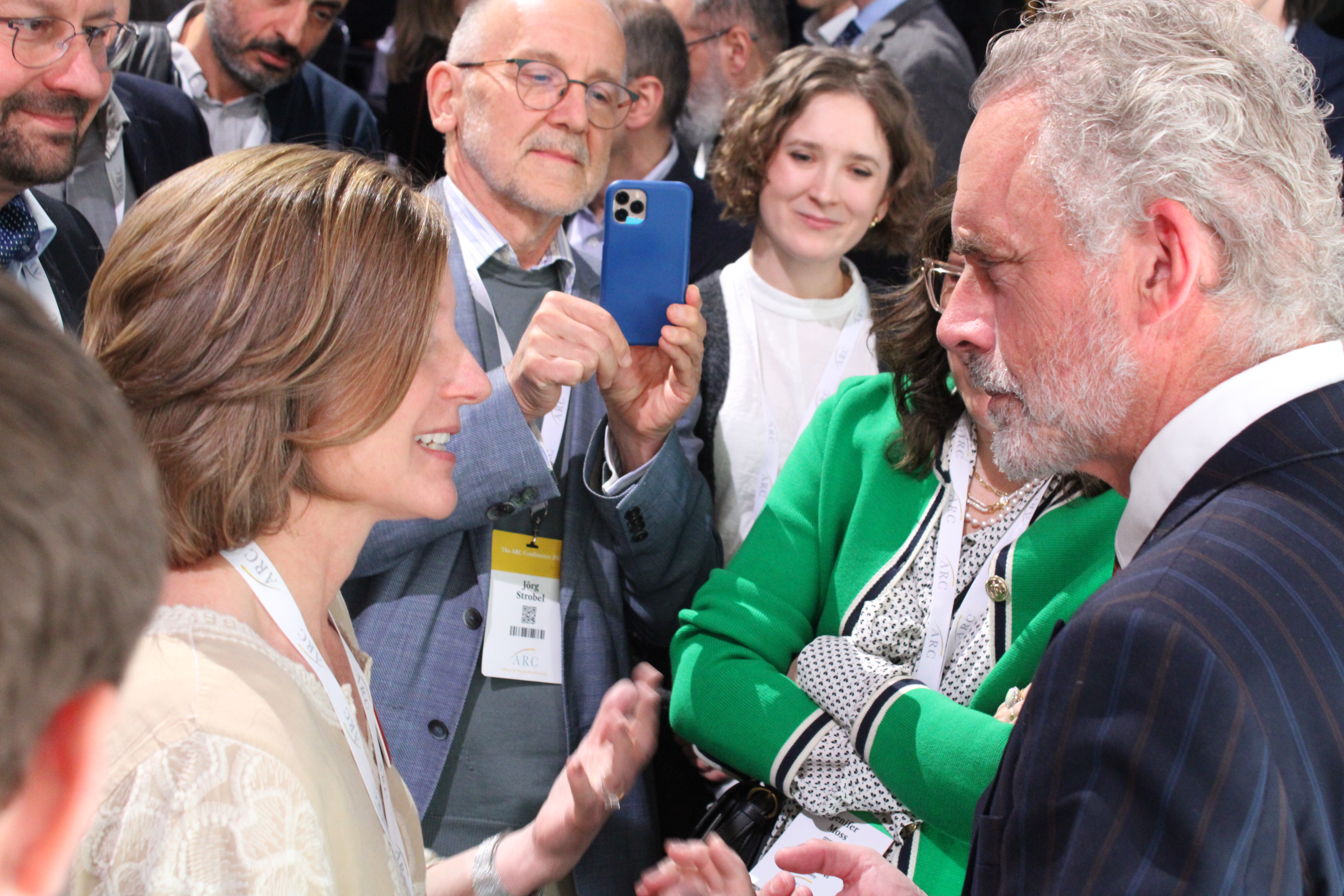
Peterson speaking with an attendee at ARC 2025 in London

In November 2023, the Alliance for Responsible Citizenship, an organization affiliated with Peterson, held a three day conference beginning with a statement by Peterson stating that "We do not believe that humanity is necessarily and inevitably teetering on the brink of apocalyptic disaster." The conference hosted several speakers who downplayed the extent of anthropogenic climate change and promoted the use of fossil fuels. Attendee and biologist Jennifer Marohasy characterized the conference as a platform for spreading climate change denialism.

Peterson has been criticized by climate scientists for providing a platform on his YouTube channel to climate deniers such as Judith Curry and Alex Epstein. Michael Mann of the University of Pennsylvania criticized Peterson for "poisoning the minds of so many influenceable people with his pseudo-intellectual and pseudoscientific drivel, drivel that is being weaponized in the right-wing assault on science and reason" and described him as "a central cog in the denial machine". Researchers at the Center for Countering Digital Hate identified Peterson as a key example of a new form of climate change denial on YouTube. With much of the public aware of the existence of climate change, the "New Denial" explained in the report does not attempt to deny the fact of climate change but rather argues that "climate solutions won't work, that the science backing those solutions is unreliable, or that global warming isn't actually harmful".

=== Religion ===
In a 2017 interview, Peterson was asked if he was a Christian; he responded, "I suppose the most straight-forward answer to that is yes." When asked if he believes in God, Peterson responded: "I think the proper response to that is no, but I'm afraid he might exist." In a podcast with Douglas Murray and Jonathan Pageau, Peterson stated that God is the "ultimate fictional character" which is "at the top of the hierarchy of attention and action".

Writing for The Spectator, Tim Lott said Peterson draws inspiration from the Jungian interpretation of religion and holds views similar to the Christian existentialism of Søren Kierkegaard and Paul Tillich. Lott also said that Peterson has respect for Taoism, as it views nature as a struggle between order and chaos and posits life would be meaningless without this duality. He has also expressed his admiration for some of the teachings of the Eastern Orthodox Church.

Burston argues that Peterson's views on religion reflect a preoccupation with what Tillich calls the vertical or transcendent dimension of religious experience, to the detriment of what Tillich termed the horizontal dimension of faith, which demands social justice in the tradition of the biblical prophets. Burston describes such a one-sided emphasis on "internal or inner-worldly transformation" as a "hallmark of the traditionalist conservative mindset".

Peterson expanded on his religious views in We Who Wrestle with God, an analytical reading of the first five books of the Bible as well as the Book of Job and the Book of Jonah, published in 2024. Christianity Today said, "On its own terms, Peterson's exegesis can be quite successful," but adding it was "slippery on theological truth". The Times was more critical, saying the "book is unreadable. Repetitive, rambling, hectoring and mad," describing his reading of the text as "symbological paranoia ... biblical scholarship as conspiracy theory." In The Guardian, Rowan Williams wrote that Peterson's "insistent contempt for nuance and disagreement ... and the reduction of any alternative perspective to its most shallow or trivial form, does not encourage the serious engagement Peterson presumably wants."

In May 2025, Peterson engaged in a debate with 20 atheists that was hosted by Jubilee Media and was originally titled 1 Christian vs. 20 atheists. However, during the debate, which went viral on social media, Peterson refused to identify as a Christian and was evasive about his religious beliefs. This came as a surprise to the atheists he was debating, who had specifically been invited to the show to debate a "Christian". Shortly after release, the title was changed to Jordan Peterson vs. 20 atheists.

== Influence ==
In 2018, Kelefa Sanneh wrote in The New Yorker that Peterson "is now one of the most influential—and polarizing—public intellectuals in the English-speaking world". In 2022, Mick Brown wrote in The Daily Telegraph that Peterson "has become the most visible, outspoken and certainly the most polarising figure in the 'culture wars' between Left and Right, challenging the new orthodoxies of political correctness that have permeated academia, education, and political and cultural life." In August 2018, Caitlin Flanagan of The Atlantic argued that Peterson is popular especially among young white men because of his opposition to identity politics. Zack Beauchamp of Vox states that while Peterson's conservative criticism of identity politics and political correctness is not new, his academic credentials make them feel much more authoritative. The Canadian news magazine Maclean's characterized Peterson as a pseudo-intellectual popular with the alt-right, characterizing him as superficially profound but influential as "the stupid man's smart person", a label which has been repeated by several other publications.

During a press tour to promote her film Don't Worry Darling (2022), Olivia Wilde said the sinister character Frank was inspired by Peterson. She described him as "this insane man, Jordan Peterson, who is this pseudo-intellectual hero to the incel community." Peterson called the film "the latest bit of propaganda disseminated by the woke, self-righteous bores and bullies who now dominate Hollywood." He also criticized the term "incel", calling it a "casual insult" for men who are "lonesome and they don't know what to do and everyone piles abuse on them."

=== Debates and media appearances ===
Beginning in 2003, Peterson appeared on television, speaking on a subject from a psychological perspective. On TVOntario, he appeared on Big Ideas in 2003 and 2006, and in a 13-part lecture series based on Maps of Meaning, aired in 2004. In a 2007 BBC Horizon documentary, Mad but Glad, Peterson commented on the connection between pianist Nick van Bloss' Tourette syndrome diagnosis and his musical talent. From 2011, TVOntario's The Agenda featured Peterson as an essayist and panelist on psychologically relevant cultural issues.

Peterson has also been featured in the documentary films No Safe Spaces, What Is a Woman?, and The Rise of Jordan Peterson. Regarding the topic of religion and God, Bret Weinstein moderated a debate between Peterson and Sam Harris at the Orpheum Theatre in Vancouver in June 2018. In July, the two debated the subject again, this time moderated by Douglas Murray, at the 3Arena in Dublin and The O2 Arena in London. In April 2019, Peterson debated Slavoj Žižek at the Sony Centre in Toronto over happiness under capitalism versus Marxism.

== Personal life ==
Starting around 2000, Peterson began collecting Soviet-era paintings. In 2016, Peterson became an honorary member of the extended family of Charles Joseph, a Kwakwakaʼwakw artist, and was given the name Alestalagie ("Great Seeker").

As of 2026, Peterson lives in Arizona.

=== Family ===
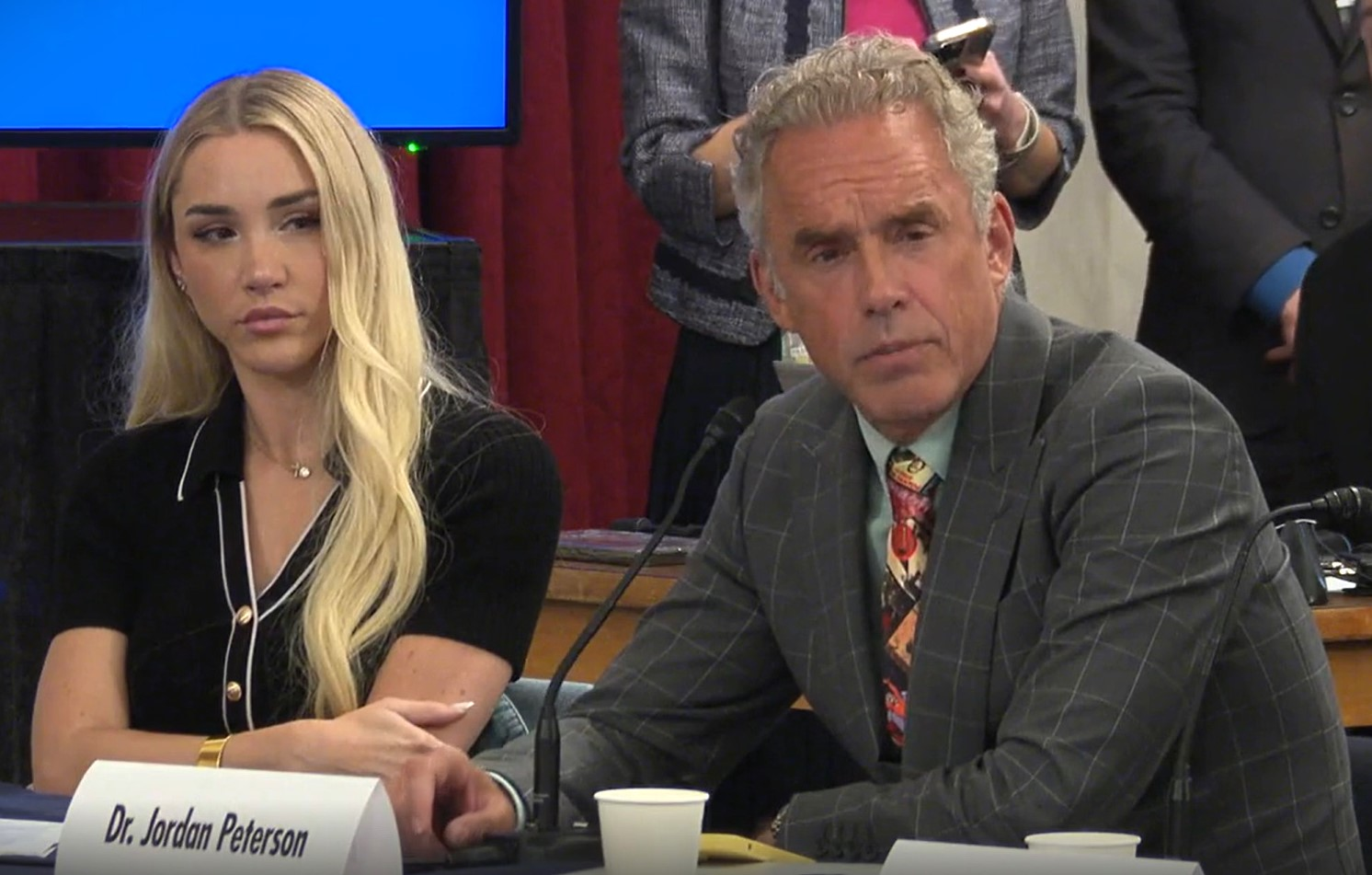
Peterson with daughter Mikhaila Peterson Fuller in 2024

Peterson married Tammy Roberts in 1989, with whom he has a daughter, Mikhaila, who is named after Soviet leader Mikhail Gorbachev, and a son, Julian. Peterson's sister is married to computer architect Jim Keller.

Mikhaila suffered from juvenile rheumatoid arthritis (JRA) in her childhood, requiring a hip and ankle replacement when she was 17 years old. Mikhaila, who also has a career as a political commentator and podcaster, has since adopted what she calls "the lion diet", consisting entirely of eating only beef, salt, and water. While analyzing Mikhaila's diet and promotion thereof, a 2020 New Republic article by writer Lindsay Beyerstein described her as a "nutrition 'influencer' with no medical credentials".

=== Health issues ===
In 2016, Peterson restricted his diet to only meat and a few vegetables in an attempt to control his depression and the effects of an autoimmune disorder. In mid-2018, he stopped eating vegetables altogether and continued eating only beef, salt, and water. Nutrition experts point out that such a diet can result in "severe dysregulation".

Peterson was prescribed clonazepam for anxiety that reportedly began after this. The dose started at 0.5 mg/day in 2016 and had increased to 4 mg/day by 2020. Peterson attributed his increased usage of clonazepam to his wife Tammy's diagnosis of kidney cancer. Peterson said that he made several attempts to reduce the dosage or stop the drug completely, but experienced "horrific" benzodiazepine withdrawal syndrome.

According to Peterson, in January 2020 he was unable to find North American doctors willing to place him into a medically induced coma as a treatment for his addiction. As a result he flew to Moscow, Russia to find a doctor who would perform the procedure. Doctors in Russia reportedly diagnosed him with pneumonia in both lungs upon arrival and placed him into a medically induced coma for eight days, followed by four weeks in the intensive care unit, during which time he reported having suffered a temporary loss of motor skills.

For several months after treatment in Russia, Peterson and his family moved to Belgrade, Serbia. In June 2020, Peterson made his first public appearance in over a year, when he appeared on an episode of his daughter's podcast recorded in Belgrade, at which point he was "back to [his] regular self". In August 2020, Peterson's daughter announced her father had contracted COVID-19 during his hospital stay in Serbia. Two months later, Peterson informed viewers of his YouTube channel he had returned to Canada and aimed to resume work in the near future.

Since August 2025, Peterson has been suffering from chronic inflammatory response syndrome. He was in an intensive care unit for three months, after being diagnosed with polyneuropathy, and later myopathy. As of December 2025, his family confirmed his return home, despite little improvements to his health.

In April 2026, an update was released by Peterson's daughter, that he had been suffering from akathisia (a possible side effect of antipsychotics, antidepressants, and benzodiazepines). She shared that Peterson had also suffered from it in previous years.

== Bibliography ==
=== Books ===
In 1999, Routledge published Maps of Meaning: The Architecture of Belief, in which Peterson describes a theory about how people construct meaning, form beliefs, and make narratives. According to Peterson, his main goal was to examine why individuals and groups alike participate in social conflict, exploring the reasoning and motivation individuals take to support their belief systems (i.e. ideological identification) that can eventually result in murderous and pathological atrocities, such as the Gulag, the Auschwitz concentration camp, and the Rwandan genocide.

In January 2018, Penguin Random House published Peterson's second book, 12 Rules for Life: An Antidote to Chaos, in which self-help principles are discussed in a more accessible style than in his previous published work. The book appeared on several best-seller lists.

Peterson's third book, Beyond Order: 12 More Rules for Life, was released on 2 March 2021. On 23 November 2020, his publisher Penguin Random House Canada (PRH Canada) held an internal town hall where many employees criticized the decision to publish the book.

- Maps of Meaning: The Architecture of Belief. Routledge. 1999. ISBN 978-0-415-92222-7.
- 12 Rules for Life: An Antidote to Chaos. Penguin Random House. 2018. ISBN 978-0-345-81602-3.
- Beyond Order: 12 More Rules for Life. Penguin Random House. 2021. ISBN 978-0-735-27833-2.
- An ABC of Childhood Tragedy (Volume 1). Libra Press. 2022. ISBN 978-1-955858-09-0.
- We Who Wrestle with God: Perceptions of the Divine. Penguin Random House. 2024. ISBN 978-0-593-54253-8.

=== Select publications ===
- Peterson J. B.; Rothfleisch J.; Zalazo P.; Pihl R. O. (1990). "Acute alcohol intoxication and cognitive functioning". Journal of Studies on Alcohol. 51 (2): 114–122. doi:10.15288/jsa.1990.51.114. PMID 2308348.
- Pihl R. O.; Peterson J. B.; Finn P. R. (1990). "Inherited Predisposition to Alcoholism: Characteristics of Sons of Male Alcoholics". Journal of Abnormal Psychology. 99 (3): 291–301. doi:10.1037/0021-843X.99.3.291. PMID 2212280.
- Pihl R. O.; Peterson J. B.; Lau M. A. (1993). "A biosocial model of the alcohol–aggression relationship". Journal of Studies on Alcohol, Supplement. 11 (11): 128–139. doi:10.15288/jsas.1993.s11.128. PMID 8410954.
- Stewart S. H.; Peterson J. B.; Pihl R. O. (1995). "Anxiety sensitivity and self-reported alcohol consumption rates in university women". Journal of Anxiety Disorders. 9 (4): 283–292. doi:10.1016/0887-6185(95)00009-D.
- Peterson J. B.; Smith K. W.; Carson S. (2002). "Openness and extraversion are associated with reduced latent inhibition: Replication and commentary". Personality and Individual Differences. 33 (7): 1137–1147. CiteSeerX 10.1.1.996.7108. doi:10.1016/S0191-8869(02)00004-1.
- DeYoung C. G.; Peterson J. B.; Higgins D. M. (2002). "Higher-order factors of the Big Five predict conformity: Are there neuroses of health?". Personality and Individual Differences. 33 (4): 533–552. CiteSeerX 10.1.1.548.5403. doi:10.1016/S0191-8869(01)00171-4.
- Carson S. H.; Quilty L. C.; Peterson J. B. (2003). "Decreased Latent Inhibition Is Associated With Increased Creative Achievement in High-functioning Individuals". Journal of Personality and Social Psychology. 85 (3): 499–506. doi:10.1037/0022-3514.85.3.499. PMID 14498785. S2CID 3968611.
- DeYoung C. G.; Peterson J. B.; Higgins D. M. (2005). "Sources of openness/intellect: Cognitive and neuropsychological correlates of the fifth factor of personality". Journal of Personality. 73 (5): 825–858. CiteSeerX 10.1.1.495.418. doi:10.1111/j.1467-6494.2005.00330.x. PMID 15958136.
- Carson S. H.; Quilty L. C.; Peterson J. B. (2005). "Reliability, Validity, and Factor Structure of the Creative Achievement Questionnaire". Creativity Research Journal. 17 (1): 37–50. doi:10.1207/s15326934crj1701_4. S2CID 146304521.
- Mar R. A.; Oatley K.; Hirsh J. B.; Paz J. D.; Peterson J. B. (2006). "Bookworms versus nerds: Exposure to fiction versus non-fiction, divergent associations with social ability, and the simulation of fictional social worlds". Journal of Research in Personality. 40 (5): 694–712. doi:10.1016/j.jrp.2005.08.002.
- DeYoung C. G.; Hasher L.; Djikic M.; Criger B.; Peterson J. B. (2007). "Morning people are stable people: Circadian rhythm and the higher-order factors of the Big Five". Personality and Individual Differences. 43 (2): 267–276. doi:10.1016/j.paid.2006.11.030.
- DeYoung C. G.; Quilty L. C.; Peterson J. B. (2007). "Between Facets and Domains: 10 Aspects of the Big Five". Journal of Personality and Social Psychology. 93 (5): 880–896. Bibcode:2007JPSP...93..880D. doi:10.1037/0022-3514.93.5.880. PMID 17983306. S2CID 8261816.
- Mar R. A.; Oatley K.; Peterson J. B. (2009). "Exploring the link between reading fiction and empathy: Ruling out individual differences and examining outcomes". The European Journal of Communication Research. 34 (4): 407–429. doi:10.1515/COMM.2009.025. S2CID 16953763.
- Hirsh J. B.; DeYoung C. G.; Xu X.; Peterson J. B. (2010). "Compassionate Liberals and Polite Conservatives: Associations of Agreeableness with Political Ideology and Moral Values". Personality and Social Psychology Bulletin. 95 (2): 655–664. doi:10.1177/0146167210366854. PMID 20371797. S2CID 15424276.
- Morisano D.; Hirsh J. B.; Peterson J. B.; Pihl R. O.; Shore B. M. (2010). "Setting, elaborating, and reflecting on personal goals improves academic performance". Journal of Applied Psychology. 36 (5): 255–264. doi:10.1037/a0018478. PMID 20230067.
- Hirsh J. B.; Mar R. A.; Peterson J. B. (2012). "Psychological Entropy: A Framework for Understanding Uncertainty-related Anxiety". Psychological Review. 119 (2): 304–320. doi:10.1037/a0026767. PMID 22250757.
