= The Rise of Jordan Peterson =

- Directed by: Patricia Marcoccia
- Written by: Patricia Marcoccia; Paul Kemp
- Starring: Jordan Peterson
- Cinematography: Tim Hutchison; Patricia Marcoccia
- Edited by: Patricia Marcoccia; Deanna Scriver
- Music by: Oliver Johnson
- Production company: Holding Space Films
- Distributed by: Gravitas Ventures (US); Sideways Film (World Excluding North America)
- Release date: September 26, 2019
- Running time: 91 minutes
- Country: Canada
- Language: English

The Rise of Jordan Peterson is a 2019 Canadian documentary film about clinical psychologist and professor Jordan Peterson. It was directed by Patricia Marcoccia and produced by Holding Space Films. It is an extended theatrical version of Marcoccia's television documentary Shut Him Down: The Rise of Jordan Peterson which was broadcast in 2018 as an episode of CBC Docs POV.

== Background ==
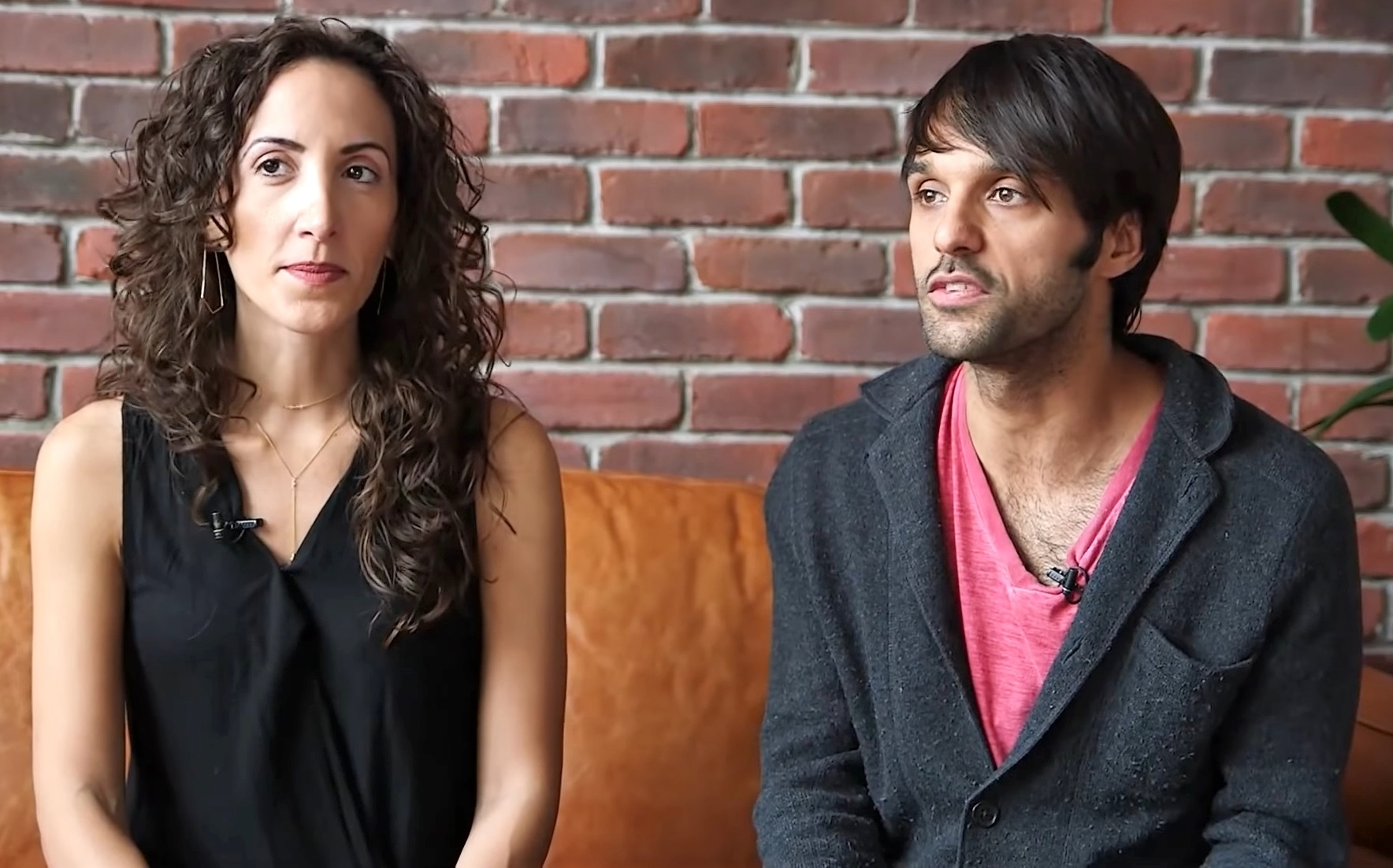
Marcoccia and Ghaderi on Rebel Wisdom in 2019

In 2015, Canadian filmmakers and husband and wife Maziar Ghaderi and Patricia Marcoccia started filming a documentary about Canadian psychology professor Jordan Peterson, who was little-known at the time. Marcoccia first became aware of Peterson's work while studying psychology at university in the early 2000s, where she discovered his first book, Maps of Meaning. Her interest in Peterson grew from there and in 2015, finally approached him with the idea of making a documentary, which he agreed to. The Rise of Jordan Peterson is Marcoccia's first feature film, having previously worked solely on short subjects.

For the first year-and-a-half, the initial focus of the film was Peterson's personal and professional life as well as his friendship with Kwakwaka'wakw artist Charles Joseph. Its title at this stage was Mixala, a Kwak'wala word meaning "to dream". This changed in 2016 when Peterson posted a video on YouTube criticizing political correctness and Bill C-16, which went viral and led to his rise to prominence and as a "lightning rod for controversy". Marcoccia recalled: "If the order of events had been switched around and I had just heard about him through this controversy around him criticizing Bill C-16 and pronouns and political correctness, it probably wouldn't have been the story that I would've been chasing. So it was more like the controversy came to me." As a result, the filmmakers changed the direction of the film to "documenting Peterson's new life as a best-selling author and TV star". Filming became increasingly difficult, as Ghaderi and Marcoccia had to work around Peterson's increasingly busy schedule. Until the latter part of 2017, Ghaderi and Marcoccia funded the project themselves, after which they were able to secure a budget to complete it.

The Rise of Jordan Peterson is an extended theatrical version of Marcoccia's documentary Shut Him Down, which aired on the Canadian Broadcasting Corporation (CBC) Docs POV in 2018. Many hours of footage were not used in the film due to time constraints. One segment involved an interview with an anonymous private investigator who had started to collect evidence against Peterson in a case that was to be brought to the International Human Rights Tribunal.

Having completed the documentary, Marcoccia intends to finish the initial film that she and Ghaderi had started in 2015, prior to Peterson's rise in fame.

== Reception ==
The documentary has received reviews in Wired, The Irish Times, and the National Review.

Some scheduled screenings of the documentary have been cancelled, citing employee discomfort. Other venues hosting screenings have received threats of violence.
