= We Who Wrestle with God: Perceptions of the Divine =

2024 book by Jordan Peterson

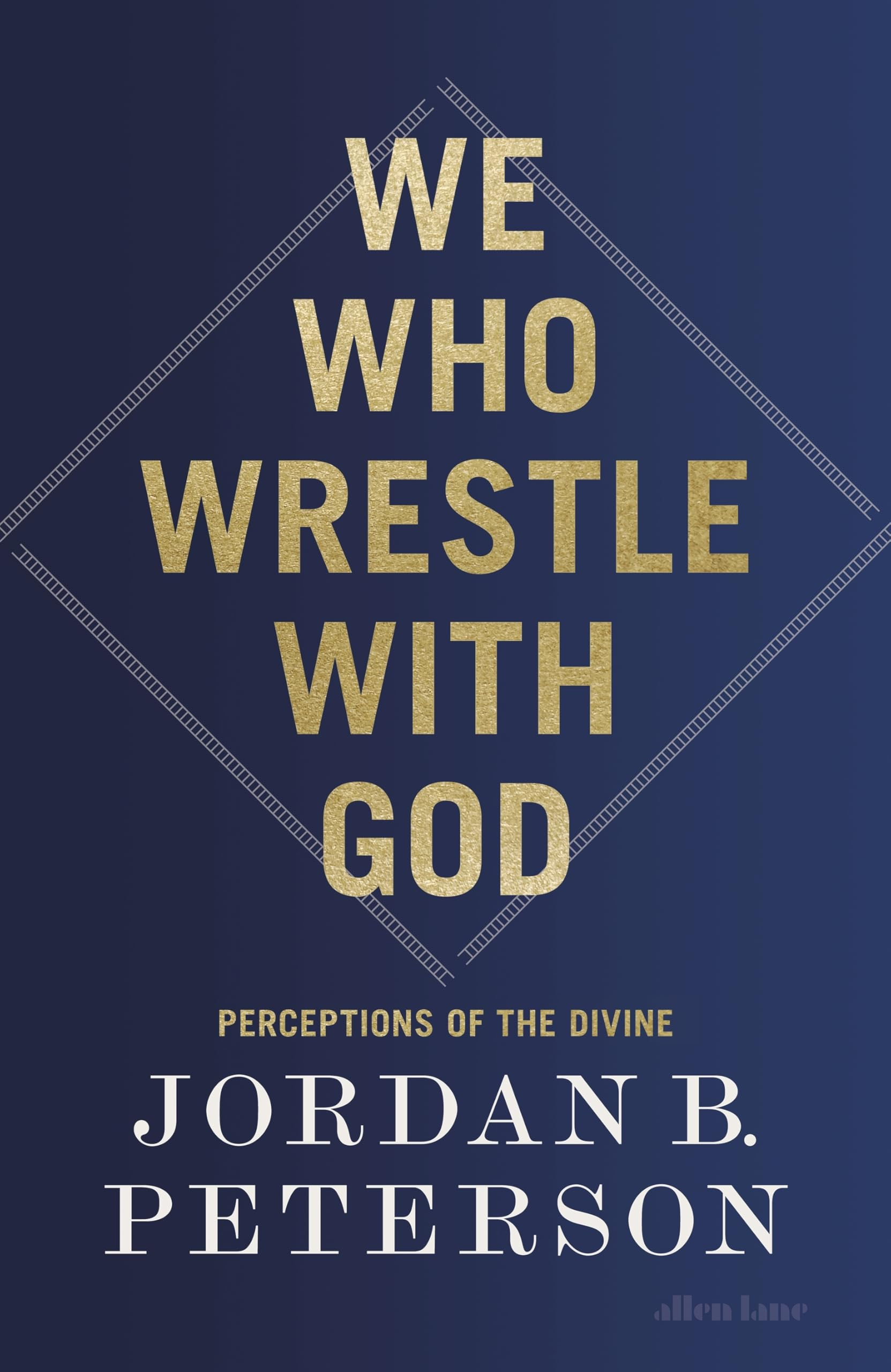
- Author: Jordan Peterson
- Publication date: November 19, 2024
- ISBN: 978-0-241-61963-6

We Who Wrestle with God: Perceptions of the Divine is a 2024 book by Jordan Peterson that analyses the Bible and biblical narrative psychology and their relationship to philosophical thought with a focus on archetypal symbols, existential psychology, and religious psychology.

== Content ==
With inspiration from his Biblical lectures series and his 1999 book Maps of Meaning, Peterson wrote We Who Wrestle with God to explore the psychological themes within the Bible, mostly focusing on the Old Testament. He reflects upon themes including creation, logos, suffering, transcendence, transformation. Foremost of his ideas and interpretations in his lectures and as appears in We Who Wrestle with God is an axiological or teleological interpretation of God as practically serving as what people value most, inspired partly by Carl Jung's ideas, and psychologically regulating "principle" which resembles "goal setting" in psychotherapeutic interventions and "moral contemplation" in theological traditions. Within it there are references to Gnosticism and catholic mysticism which highlight parallels to the tradition of Christian mysticism. As is suggested by the subtitle "perceptions of the divine," the author, while exploring the Old Testament books sequentially, also offers the idea that the symbolic element of the Biblical narrative encodes at an unconscious level which determined how western society developed its attention patterns.

== Reception ==
The book saw varying responses. Christianity Today said of the text that "Peterson is lingering just outside the church, theologically lukewarm, secure in his insecurity." while The Guardian found it repetitive.
