= Robert O. Pihl =

American psychologist (born 1939)

- Born: February 2, 1939 (age 87); Milwaukee, Wisconsin, U.S.
- Education: Lawrence University (BA); Arizona State University (MA, PhD)
- Scientific career
- Fields: Psychology
- Workplaces: McGill University
- Doctoral advisor: Joel Greenspoon
- Doctoral students: Jordan Peterson
- Website: www.mcgill.ca/psychology/robert-o-pihl

Robert O. Pihl (born February 2, 1939) is an American psychology researcher, professor and clinician. Since 1966, he has worked at McGill University in Montreal, Canada. He is also a fellow of the American Psychological Association and Canadian Psychological Association, as well as a member of many other academic organizations.

Pihl has made major contributions to the fields of clinical and health psychology in his more than 250 publications on various topics such as alcohol aggression, substance abuse, and pharmacology. In 2009, he received the Canadian Psychological Association's Gold Medal Award for Distinguished Lifetime Contributions to Canadian Psychology.

== Education ==
Pihl received a BA from Lawrence University (Appleton, Wisconsin) and an MA degree from Arizona State University (Tempe, Arizona). At the time, he worked in a neurological hospital and became interested in impulse control. In 1966, he received his PhD in Psychology from Arizona State, under the supervision of Joel Greenspoon, a clinical psychologist and leading researcher in behavioral analysis. Pihl completed his clinical internship from 1964 to 1966 at the Barrow Neurological Institute in Phoenix, Arizona.

== Professional life ==
=== Research and publications ===
Pihl's research includes over 250 publications, on which he has collaborated with over 200 co-authors from around the world. According to Google Scholar, his work has been cited over 16,000 times. He is also on the board of reviewing editors for Alcoholism: Clinical and Experimental Research. Pihl's research addresses psychopharmacology, alcohol, aggression, substance abuse, behavior modification, the cognitive consequences of addiction, and several risk factors for disorders.

Some of Pihl's early research projects involved the hair analysis of children with learning disabilities. He found that children with learning disabilities had higher levels of lead and cadmium in their hair compared to children without these disabilities. These findings influenced the US Congress to mandate that lead be removed from paint in the 1970s. Pihl later conducted similar analyzes in which he also found greater levels of lead and cadmium in the hair of violent criminals, compared to the normal population.

Pihl has extensively studied the link between alcohol and aggression, namely that alcohol consumption increases aggression. He has also studied other predictors of aggression, such as pain sensitivity, levels of cognitive functioning, and one's social environment. His investigations of the link between tryptophan depletion and aggression suggest an association between disturbances of the brain's serotonin system and one's aggression. Pihl linked this research to alcohol intoxication, finding that intoxicated subjects with lower tryptophan (and thus lower serotonin) levels in the brain were more aggressive than those with higher serotonin levels. Pihl has also researched motivational, physiological and cognitive factors that predict substance abuse. Pihl looked at people's varying reactions to substance consumption, and how this affects their behavior when intoxicated. He investigated the risk factors for abuse of different substances, and in 2000 Pihl collaborated in developing The Substance Use Risk Profile Scale, a scale for classifying substance abusers on the basis of personality and motivational risk factors for substance abuse, such as hopelessness, impulsivity, and sensation-seeking.

Some of his most notable research publications include:

- Experimental analysis of the placebo effect (Pihl & Altman, 1971)
- The problem of drug abuse: Has Canada found some answers? (Milstein, Pihl, & Smart, 1974)
- Effects of alcohol and behavior contingencies on human aggression (Zeichner, & Pihl, 1979)
- Measurement of Psychological and Heart Rate Reactivity to Stress in the Real World (Dobkin & Pihl, 1992)
- Cognitive deficits and autonomic reactivity in boys at high risk for alcoholism (Harden & Pihl, 1995)
- The effect of altered tryptophan levels and alcohol on aggression in normal human males (Pihl, Young, Harden, Plotnick, Chamberlain, & Ervin, 1995)
- Hair element content in learning disabled children (Pihl & Parkes, 1977)
- Motivational model of substance abuse risk (Conrod, Pihl, Stewart, Coté, & Dongier, 1997)

=== Clinical work ===
Pihl previously directed the department of psychology at the Lakeshore General Hospital in Montreal. He was also a co-director of the Alcohol Studies Group at the Douglas Mental Health University Institute in Montreal. He was a consultant for the psychology department at Montreal's Royal Victoria Hospital, and for the Montreal's Centre Pour Enfants avec Problèmes d'Apprentissage. Pihl is on the advisory committee of the McGill-Montreal Children's Hospital Learning Center.

=== Committees and organizations ===
Pihl is a member of several psychological committees and organizations, including: the International Society for Research on Aggression, the US National Institute on Alcohol Abuse and Alcoholism, the Neuropharmacology Subcommittee of the National Institute on Drug Abuse, the Violence and Traumatic Stress Committee, the Working Group on Alcohol-Related Violence, the Review Committee for Alcohol and Drug Abuse for Health and Welfare Canada, the Alcoholic Beverage Medical Research Foundation, and the International Society for Research on Aggression. He is a fellow in the Canadian Psychological Association, the American Psychological Association's Psychopharmacology, Addiction, Clinical Psychology, and Learning Disability Divisions, the Behavioral Science Foundation, and others. For Health and Welfare Canada, Pihl is a member of the Scientific Review Committee for Behavioral Research and the Non-medical Use of Drugs, and he is also an advisor for a group on Parent Drug Education.

=== Honors and awards ===
Pihl has received several honors and awards throughout his career. These include: the Lehmann Award from the Canadian College of Neuropsychopharmacology (1994), the Canadian Psychological Association's Gold Medal Award for Distinguished Lifetime Contributions to Canadian Psychology (2009), the National Patient Safety Award from the Drug Safety Institute (2013), the David Thomson Award for Excellence in Graduate Teaching and Supervision from McGill University (2014).
