= Joel Greenspoon =

American psychology researcher

- Born: October 11, 1920
- Died: April 24, 2004 (aged 83)
- Education: University of Virginia
- Known for: Behaviorism in psychology

Joel Greenspoon (October 11, 1920 – April 24, 2004) was an American psychology researcher, professor, and clinician. Greenspoon made notable contributions to the field of behaviorism in psychology through pioneering work on verbal operant conditioning and counterconditioning in the treatment of anxiety.

== Education ==
Greenspoon received his Bachelor of Arts degree from the University of Virginia in 1941. Immediately after college he coached at Fishburne Military School in Virginia. This experience (and world events at the time) led to his service in the United States Army from 1942 to 1946, where he became a captain and was a clinical psychologist. Upon returning from duty he completed his Master of Arts degree in psychology at the University of Pennsylvania in 1947. He completed his education at Indiana University Bloomington earning his Doctor of Philosophy degree in clinical psychology in 1952.

During his graduate school years at Indiana University Bloomington he was directly supervised by Burrhus F. Skinner, William S. Verplanck, and J. R. Kantor. Greenspoon directly attributes his passion for behaviorism to his introduction to Skinner during Skinner’s chairmanship of the psychology department there.

== Professional life ==
=== Teaching and administrative work ===
Greenspoon described his greatest passion as teaching. He taught continuously for 49 years and helped promote clinical psychology graduate programs, particularly advocating for the advancement of behaviorism in clinical practice and research.

He began teaching as a faculty member at Pomona College immediately after receiving his Ph.D. He then helped develop the graduate program in clinical psychology at Florida State University and spent time at Arizona State University. He served as department chair of psychology and dean of arts and sciences at Temple Buell College, served as department chair of psychology at the University of Texas-Permian Basin, and served as department chair of psychology at the University of North Carolina – Charlotte.

While at UTPB, he founded the Center for Behavioral Analysis. This Center was completely funded from proceeds from his private practice and continued to be so for 10 years following his death. He completed his career teaching at the University of North Texas where he was designated as an unpaid visiting professor. Greenspoon described this as his "dream job", characterizing it as "no pay, no responsibilities".

=== Clinical work ===
Throughout his career Greenspoon provided therapy services utilizing the science of behavioral analysis and operant conditioning. He ran a private practice out of a mobile trailer during his time in Texas where he worked treating individuals, predominantly with anxiety disorders. He regularly consulted and worked in clinical settings within hospitals, universities, and community mental health centers. Towards the culmination of his career he advised many researchers applying behavioral principles to the treatment of autism in children. He also served on numerous clinical psychology licensing boards in Texas.

=== Research and publications ===
Greenspoon authored over 50 journal articles and book chapters and wrote two textbooks accumulating over 1600 citations in peer literature. As an early proponent and central figure in the development of behavioral analysis in people, his work helped promote the field both in programming in universities across the nation and in scientific literature. He also had brief stints in his early career as a researcher at the U. S. Navy Electronics Laboratory and Aerojet General, both in California. His selected works include:

- The reinforcing effect of two spoken sounds on the frequency of two responses (Greenspoon, 1955)
- Verbal conditioning and clinical psychology (Greenspoon, 1962)
- Psychotherapy from the standpoint of a behaviorist (Greenspoon & Brownstein, 1967)

=== Mentoring ===
During his tenure at Arizona State University, Greenspoon supervised Robert O. Pihl’s graduate training. Pihl went onto a highly successful career as a clinical psychologist spearheading the field of alcohol-related aggression and substance abuse research at McGill University.

=== Awards and legacy ===
Greenspoon was awarded the 2011 Texas Association for Behavioral Analysis Pioneer in Behavioral Analysis award for his contributions to behavioral analysis in Texas. Paul R. Fuller, a colleague of Greenspoon from Indiana University, described Greenspoon as "...not only a best friend, he was a role model and an inspiration in strength and persistence”.

== Personal life ==
Greenspoon was born on October 11, 1920, in the small community of Charles Town, West Virginia. He was married to Alice Marie Greenspoon for almost 49 years, and who survived him for many years before dying on May 29, 2013. Together they had a son and two daughters.

== Death ==
Greenspoon died on April 20, 2004, at the age of 83 in Denton, Texas. He died due to complications from leukemia.
