= Jonathan Pageau =

Iconographer, symbolist, publisher

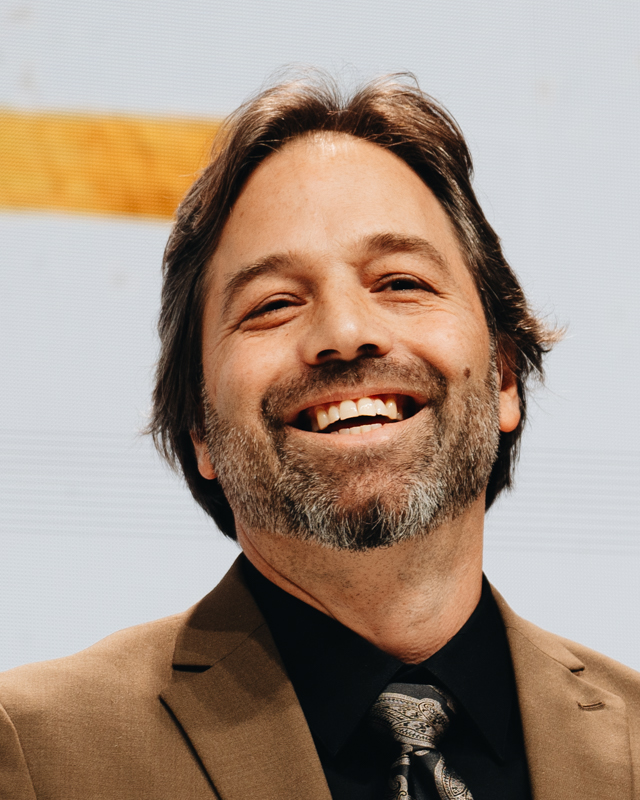
- Pageau in 2023
- Born: June 30, 1975 (age 51); Montreal, Quebec, Canada
- Education: Concordia University, Université de Sherbrooke
- Occupations: Artist, writer, teacher
- Spouse: Marti Vrastiak
- Website: www.pageaucarvings.com/index.html

Jonathan Pageau (French: [paʒo]; born 30 June 1975) is a French-Canadian icon carver, YouTuber and public speaker on symbolism, religion and Eastern Orthodox Christianity. He is the editor of the Orthodox Arts Journal, the host of the Symbolic World blog and podcast and founder of Symbolic World Press.

== Early life and education ==
Pageau's childhood was spent in Montreal, where he was strongly shaped by the dominant Catholic culture of that time. However, his family became Protestant, his father becoming a pastor of the French Baptist Church.

Pageau attended the Painting and Drawing program at Concordia University in Montreal where he trained in Postmodern approaches to art, graduating with distinction. After graduating, he set up a studio, but became frustrated by the "aloofness about Contemporary Art" he was producing. He broke with contemporary art, discarding his work from the period. By his 20s, Pageau had moved to Africa with a Mennonite charity, spending four years in Congo and three years in Kenya.

Pageau's baptismal name is Maximus, namesake of Saint Maximus the Confessor. In his conversation with 2mørVs he said, "My patreon is Saint Maximus, but Saint Gregory (of Nyssa), Saint Ephrem (the Syrian) and Saint Christopher are obviously the saints that I'm the closest to and feel that I am most drawn to and most taught by."

== Artistic career ==
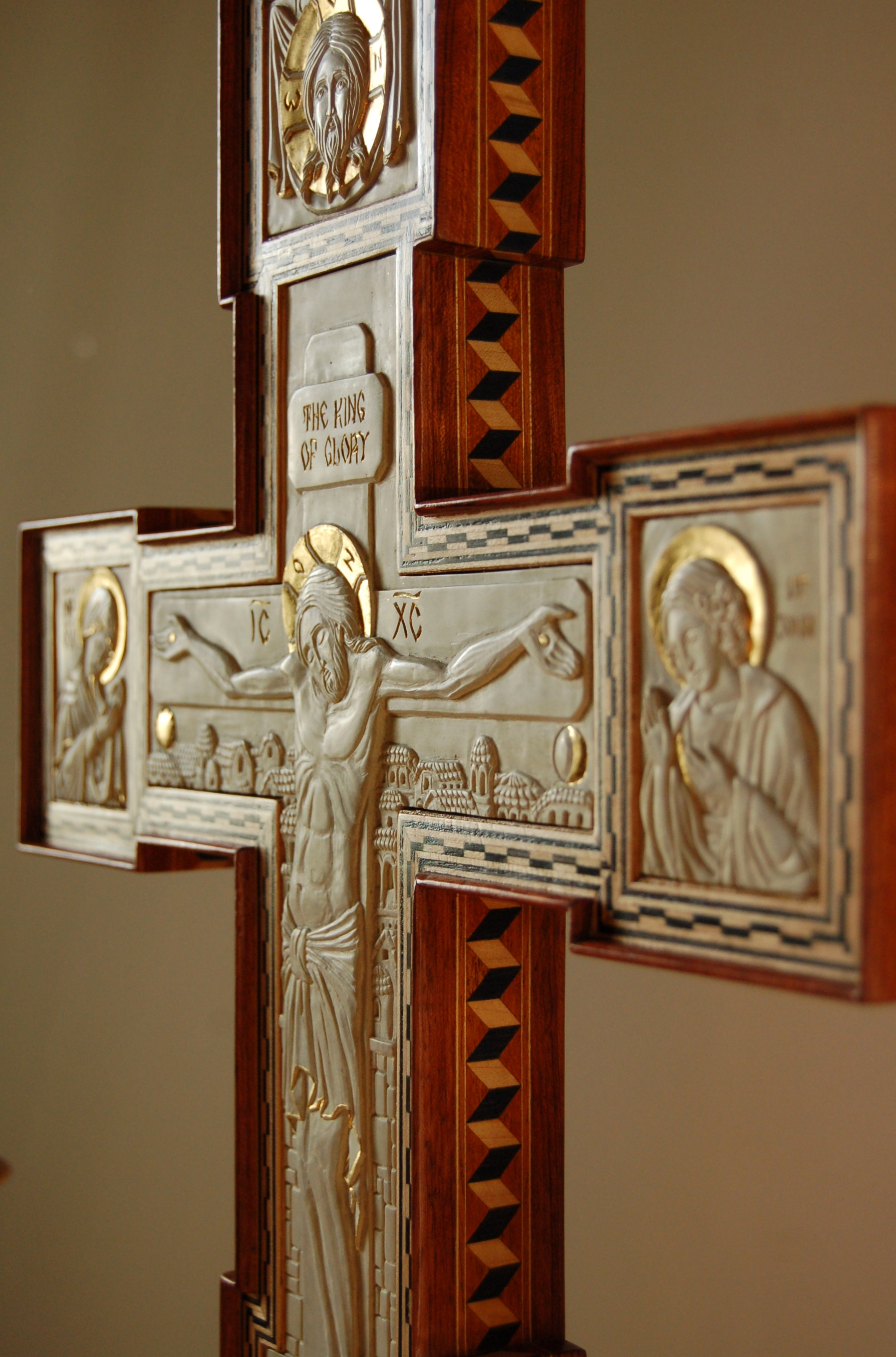
Wooden cross with carved stone icons by Jonathan Pageau and Andrew Gould, 2016

Returning from Africa, Pageau chose to study Orthodox Theology and Iconology at the University of Sherbrooke. Iconography re-kindled Pageau's interest in art and, from 2003, he began specialising in carved iconography in the Eastern Orthodox tradition, the art form for which he became known.

Conservative commentator Bradley Anderson has described Pageau's iconographic work as a response to the "dead ends" of modernism, offering instead art that invites people into community "with reverence and humility." Writer Grayson Quay has described his work as initiating viewers into "the symbolic world" of myth, legend and Scripture.

In addition to creating religious artwork, he teaches seminars in wood carving and iconography. He began publishing online videos on spirituality, art and symbolism from 2017. From this time, Pageau has also begun appearing in podcasts with Canadian writer and psychologist Jordan Peterson; he has also collaborated with the American Catholic Bishop, Robert Barron. However, it is his YouTube dialogues, most notably with Jordan Peterson where the psychologist appeared to have embraced faith, that have given him most prominence.

Pageau has exhibited his icons in several museums and exhibitions to Orthodox communities in North America. He has argued for a return to artistic treatments of Jesus of the early Church. Rather than portraits which identified Christ with one ethnic or cultural group, the "goal was to help people encounter Jesus. If an Egyptian visited an Orthodox church in Norway … he would still recognize an icon of Jesus Christ. It would speak to him. There would be unity there."

== Views ==
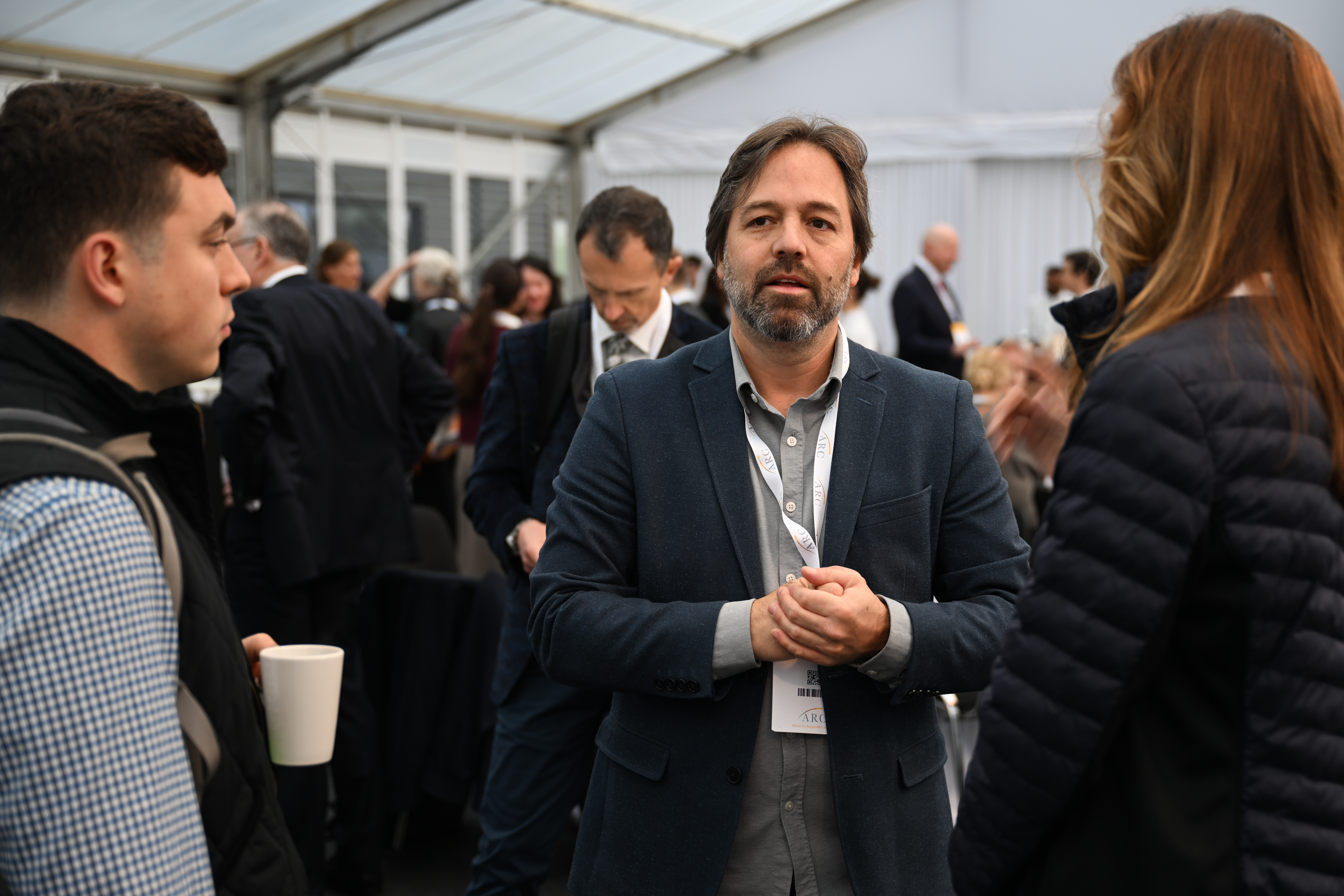
Pageau speaking to delegates at the Alliance for Responsible Citizenship in 2023

He has been seen as an advocate for a symbolic approach to the world, as well as to the Holy Scriptures. His concept of the "symbolic world" holds that all of reality should be understood as a series of interlocking patterns which embody meaning. He argues that humans are innately religious, noting the practice of kneeling that has come with 21st century social activism, and that a religious view of the world, as embodied in the writings of the Church Fathers such as Saint Maximus the Confessor, is just as complex, structured, and comprehensive as any worldview founded on science.

Pageau believes his role as an artist is to explore “the symbolic patterns that underlie our experience of the world.” He believes the world is intrinsically symbolic and is best navigated by the use of symbols. Some of his arguments about the atomisation of society have left some critics impressed, and others "uneasy" and unpersuaded.

Cracks in "cultural cohesion" have been a concern for Pageau. His observation is that Western culture has been returning to paganist patterns of thought, with social practices such as euthanasia, abortion, androgyny, and some aspects of homosexuality. He describes the state of the contemporary world as being "diabolic" in the literal sense, referring to the etymology of the word, derived from the Greek verb for "division". By contrast, Pageau believes the role of all art is to “unite opposites.” Many of these ideas are explored in Orthodox Arts Journal, where he sits on the editorial board and through his publishing house, Symbolic World Press.

Pageau's work on universal Biblical patterns has influenced others, including American educator David Mathwin. Mathwin argues children learn best when they are able to explore these patterns in the world around them.

== Personal life ==
Pageau lives in the city of his birth, Montreal, with his wife and three children. His brother, Matthieu, writes about symbolic patterns in the Book of Genesis.

== Published works ==
- Pageau, Jonathan (2022). God's' Dog: Monster. Montreal: Symbolic World Press. ISBN 978-1738726219.
- Pageau, Jonathan (2023). The Tale of Snow White and the Widow Queen. Montreal: Symbolic World Press. ISBN 979-8989083107.
- Pageau, Jonathan (2023). The Symbolism of Snow White. Montreal: Symbolic World Press. ISBN 979-8989083169.
- Pageau, Jonathan. Pollington, Heather. (2025) The Tale of Rapunzel and the Evil Witch: Symbolic World Press. ISBN 979-8989083282.
