= Alliance for Responsible Citizenship =

Organisation affiliated with Jordan Peterson

- Formation: 2023
- Founders: Baroness Stroud; Paul Marshall; Jordan Peterson; Legatum
- Type: Company limited by guarantee
- Purpose: Renewing Western culture
- Headquarters: Pall Mall, London
- CEO: Baroness Stroud
- Website: arcforum.com

The Alliance for Responsible Citizenship (ARC) is an international consortium whose aim is to unite anglophone religious and conservative voices and propose policy based on what they call "traditional Western values". It is associated with psychologist and political commentator Jordan Peterson. It was founded in June 2023, with the first London conference held in October of that year. It was funded with £1 million from hedge fund manager and GB News co-owner Paul Marshall in 2023, and a further £2 million from Marshall's Sequoia Trust in 2024, and a further $500,000 from pharmaceuticals CEO Derick Cooper in 2025.

The conference champions themes of opposition to green economic policies, opposition to abortion and opposition to multiculturalism, while supporting social conservatism.

== History ==
In an interview with The Sydney Morning Herald, former Australian deputy prime minister John Anderson, who helped initiate the conference, said the group emerged as a response to a "civilisational" moment in which the Western world "is plagued by self-doubt and confusion" regarding its values and beliefs. The "shaky ground" of depleted social institutions, such as the Christian Church, and the breakdown of cohesive social norms could be seen as part of this crisis. The founders believe the West no longer has a binding narrative, as this has been "picked apart"; leaving it with a geostrategic vulnerability. In the face of this crisis, Anderson characterised the goal of ARC was to "regroup, and put forward a positive agenda" by providing a better narrative than one of inevitable doom and decline.

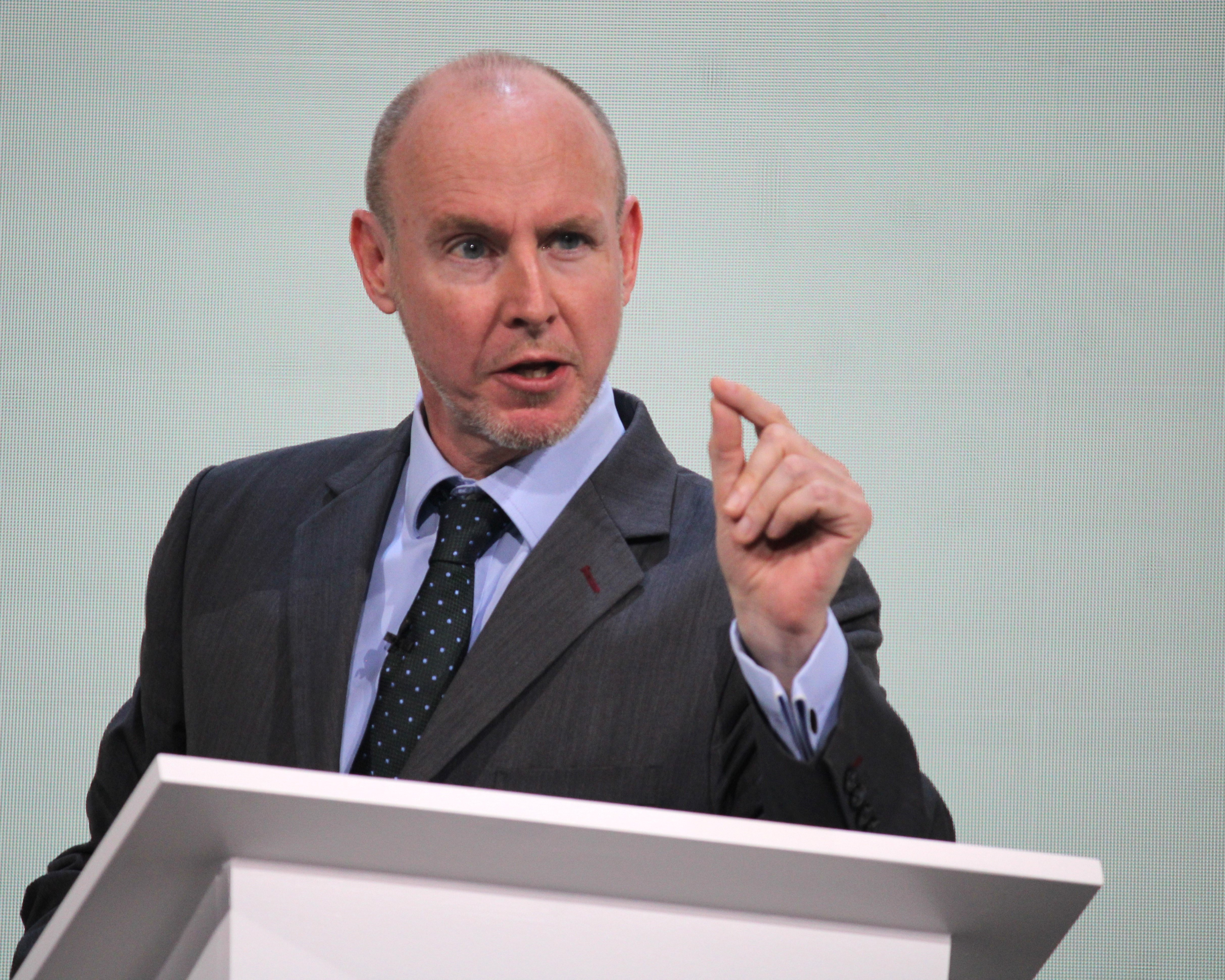
Daniel Hannan speaking at the conference, 2025

Others described ARC as being a response to problems in contemporary conservatism itself. They suggest that the conservative movement, at least in the English-speaking world, was "scrambling to define itself by what it opposes rather than what it believes". A report in The Telegraph saw the group as a corrective to the "chaos" and "excesses" in American conservatism during the rise of Donald Trump; the "muddle" of conservative beliefs in the UK; and the lack of a clear cause for conservatives in Australia. The Financial Times said that the organisation's conference "included discussion of fringe, right-leaning ideology".

It is associated with psychologist and political commentator Jordan Peterson. One Australian journalist identified the impetus of ARC being "to replace a sense of division and drift within conservatism, and Western society at large, with a renewed cohesion and purpose".

== Organisation ==
Company records in the UK show ARC has two shareholders – the Dubai-based investment management group Legatum and the British investor and Brexit advocate Sir Paul Marshall. Advisory board members included the following:

- Tony Abbott
- John Anderson
- Robin Batterham
- Stephen J. Blackwood
- Nicholas Boys Smith
- Colin Brazier
- Arthur C. Brooks
- Miriam Cates
- Christopher Chandler
- Dan Crenshaw
- Warren Farrell
- Niall Ferguson
- Maurice Glasman
- Victor Davis Hanson
- Andrew Hastie
- John Howard
- Mike Johnson
- Gudrun Kugler
- Danny Kruger
- Mike Lee
- Leslyn Lewis
- Bjørn Lomborg
- Paul Marshall
- Winston Marshall
- Helena Morrissey
- Jonathan Pageau
- Louise Perry
- Jordan Peterson
- Vivek Ramaswamy
- Michael Shellenberger
- Amanda Stoker
- Barry S. Strauss
- Philippa Stroud

== Conference ==
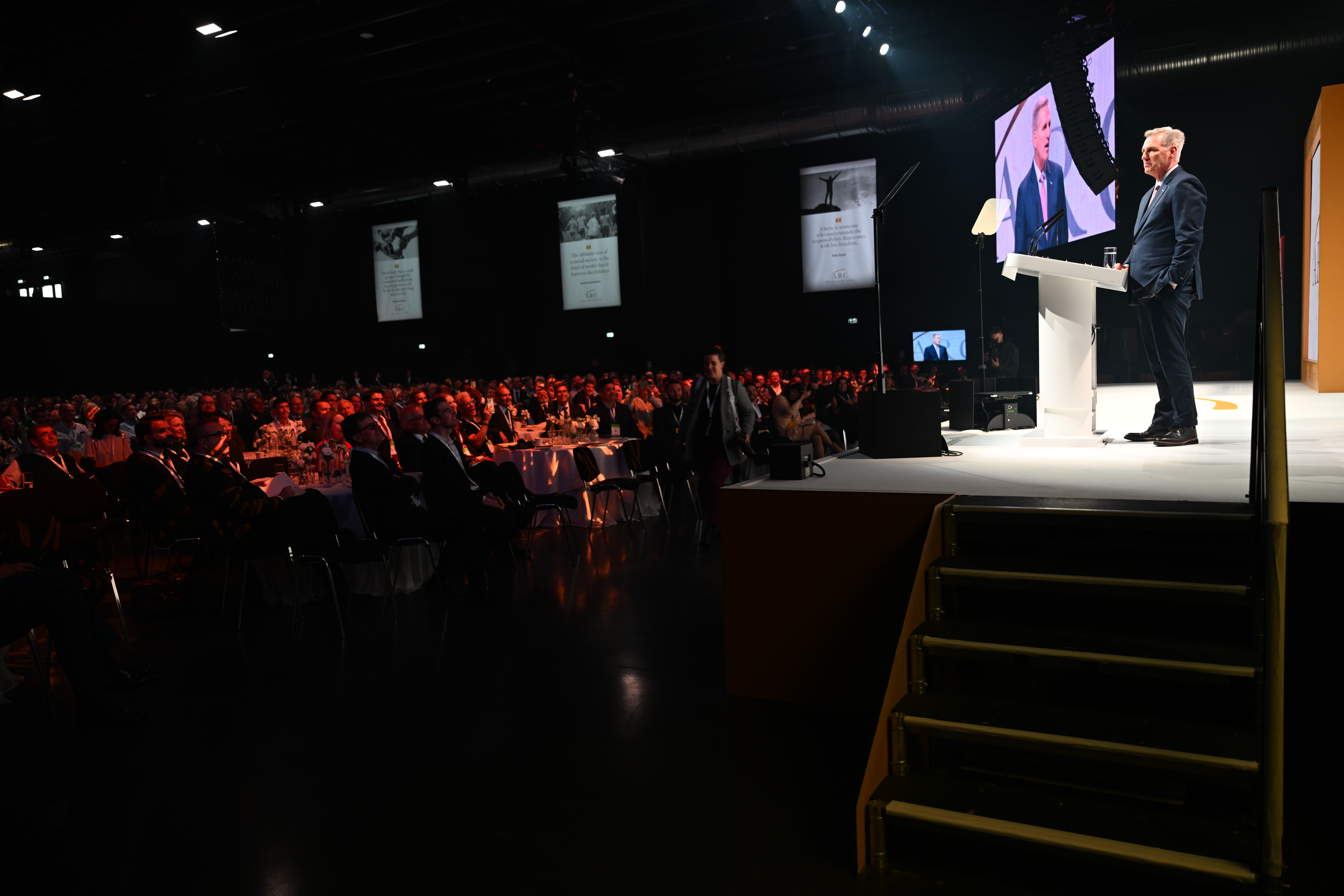
Kevin McCarthy addresses the conference, 2023.

The group's first conference was held in Greenwich, London, 30 October – 1 November 2023. The platform had 100 speakers, with delegates from 71 nations said to number between 1,000 and 1,500. The journalist Fraser Nelson of The Daily Telegraph described it as one of the "largest gatherings of the global centre Right in recent British history". A ticket to the conference cost £1,500.

Among the speakers were Kevin McCarthy, former speaker of the US House of Representatives; John Anderson, former Deputy Prime Minister of Australia; Fraser Nelson, editor of The Spectator; and former Dutch politician and writer Ayaan Hirsi Ali. Bishop Robert Barron gave a talk on "What is the True Nature of Freedom". The English author and social critic Os Guinness was on a panel discussion with Jordan Peterson, Ayaan Hirsi Ali and John Anderson.

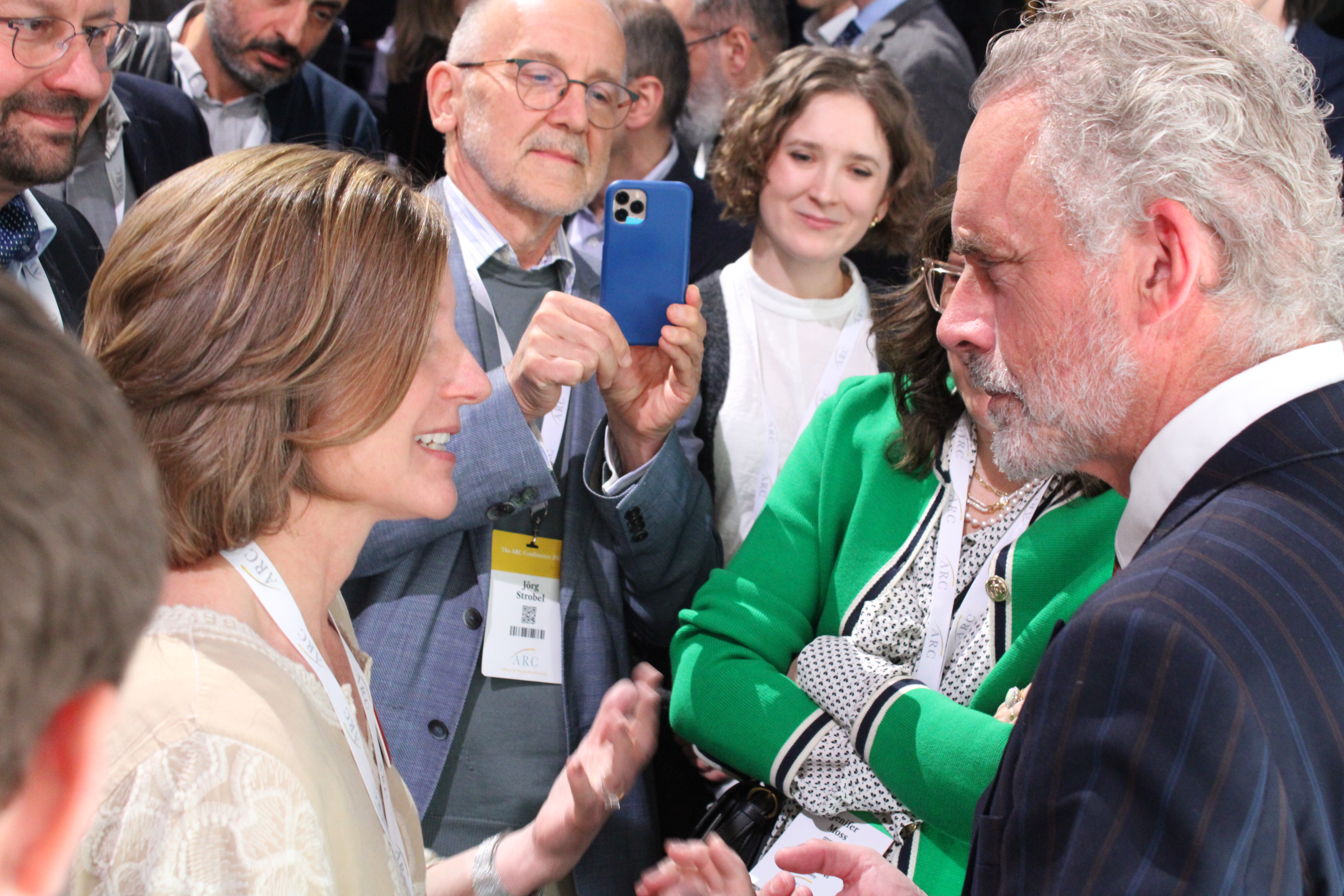
Jordan Peterson speaking with audience members after a talk, 18 February 2025

An evening event held at the O2 Arena was headlined by Jordan Peterson, with several authors and commentators, such as Douglas Murray, Ben Shapiro, global warming critic and author Bjørn Lomborg and Jonathan Pageau, and attracted a crowd near to its capacity of 20,000. It was reviewed by Premier Christianity as "high-brow thought and unscripted conversation", while some media were more critical, with The Guardian writing that, in a year of floods and heatwaves and likely to be the hottest on record, attendees were offered "a grab-bag of cherrypicked talking points that ignored the risks from climate change".

The organisation held its second conference from 15 to 19 February 2025 at ExCeL London with about 4,000 attendees.

The June 2026 conference was attended by representatives from far-right parties, American state officials who have sought to interfere with British abortion laws, Nigel Farage and those from Trump's administration, including his energy secretary, a former fossil fuel executive. Details of the donors funding the ARC and the attendees at the 2026 ARC Conference were revealed by DeSmog and Unearthed. The leaked attendees list included Trump donors, billionaires who support Reform UK, oil companies, climate change deniers and politicians from parties including Alternative for Germany (AfD), Alliance for the Union of Romanians (AUR), Vlaams Belang, Vox, and the Party for Freedom.

=== ARC Research ===
It operates a subsidiary company called ARC Research that commissions long form papers by scholars or commentators with 'anti-woke', populist or conservative-traditionalist politics.
