= Low Pay Commission =

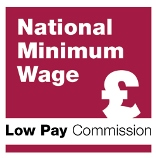
Logo of Low Pay Commission

The Low Pay Commission (LPC) is an independent body in the United Kingdom, established in 1997, that advises the government on the National Minimum Wage. It is an advisory non-departmental public body of the Department for Business and Trade (DBT).

== History and role ==
The LPC was established in July 1997 on a non-statutory basis before being confirmed in legislation by the National Minimum Wage Act 1998.

Each year, the LPC advises the government on what rates the different minimum wages in the UK should be, announcing its recommendation six months before it would come into force. It is then up to the government to accept or reject the LPC's recommendations. The government has usually accepted the wage levels advocated by the LPC.

== Structure ==
The LPC consists of nine Low Pay Commissioners who are selected by the DBT. The Commissioners are a mixture of employers, trade unionists and academics.

=== Chairs ===
- 2009 to 2017 – Sir David Norgrove
- 2017 to 2024 (2017 to 2019 as interim chair) – Bryan Sanderson
- 2024 to present – Baroness Philippa Stroud

== Proposals for reform ==
In March 2014 the Resolution Foundation issued the report More Than A Minimum which proposed that the LPC's role should be expanded to include publishing the following:

- An indication of its intentions for the minimum wage one year ahead.
- Analysis to show which sectors of the economy could afford to pay more than the minimum wage to encourage wage rises.
- Advice for government on low pay policy in the same way that the Office of Budget Responsibility influences fiscal policy.

== See also ==
- Minimum wage law
