= Philippa Stroud, Baroness Stroud =

British politician

The Right Honourable The Baroness Stroud
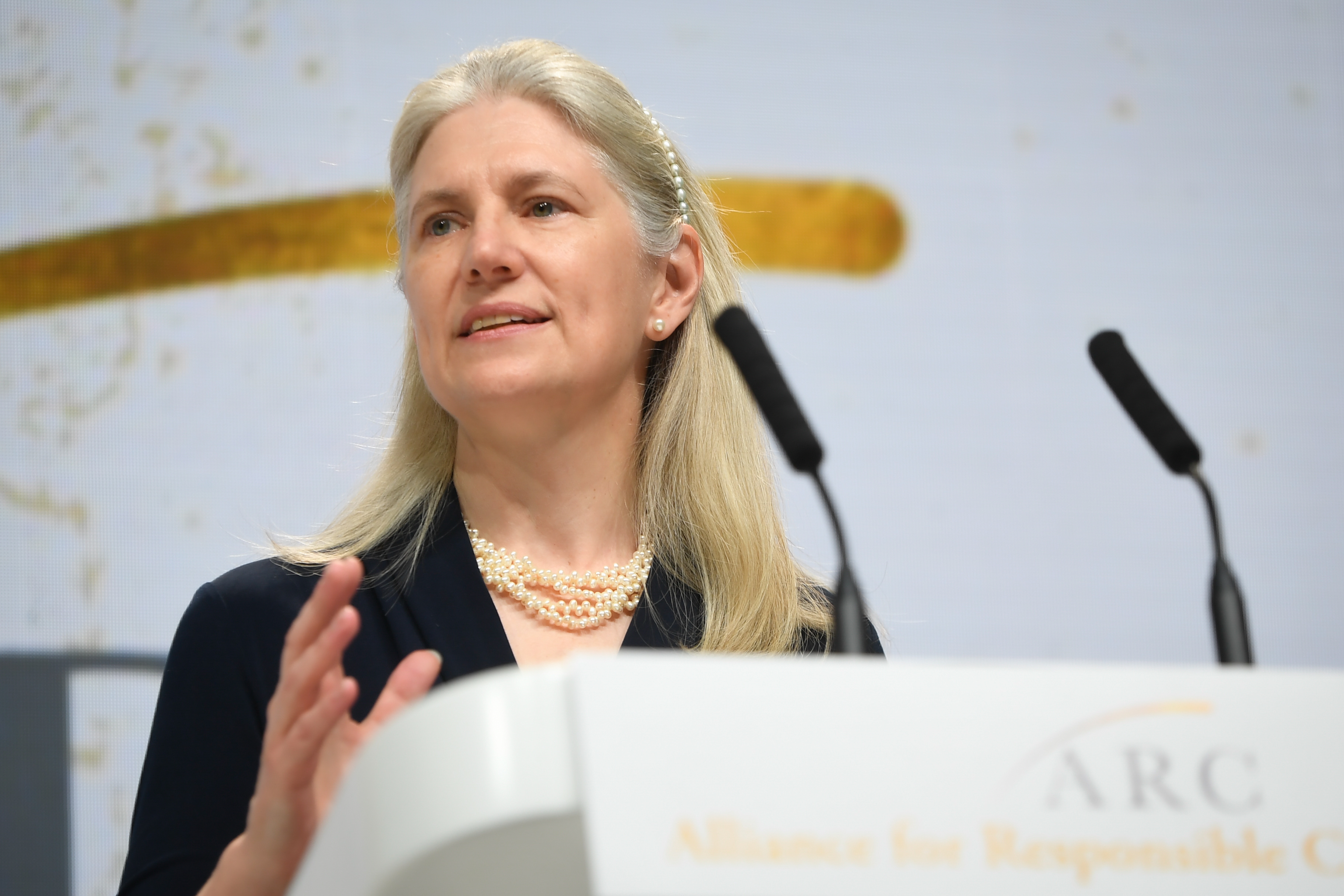
- Baroness Stroud, 2023

Chair of the Low Pay Commission
- Incumbent
- Assumed office January 2024
- Preceded by: Bryan Sanderson

Member of the House of Lords
- Lord Temporal
- Life peerage 1 October 2015

Personal details
- Born: 2 April 1965 (age 61)
- Party: Conservative
- Education: St Catherine's School, Bramley
- Alma mater: University of Birmingham
- Occupation: Think tanker

Philippa Claire Stroud, Baroness Stroud (born 2 April 1965) is a Conservative Party peer in the House of Lords and leader of several conservative think tanks.

She is co-founder and, since November 2023, the chief executive officer of Alliance for Responsible Citizenship. Stroud has held similar roles at the Legatum Institute, Centre for Social Justice and Social Metrics Commission. She is a member of the Conservative Party and in 2009 The Daily Telegraph named her as the 82nd most influential right-winger, ahead of former Conservative leader Michael Howard. By 2023, journalist Eleanor Mills described her as "the most powerful Right-winger you've never heard of."

Stroud was made a life peer on 1 October 2015 taking the title Baroness Stroud, of Fulham in the London Borough of Hammersmith and Fulham.

In January 2024, she became the chair of the Low Pay Commission.

== Early life ==
The daughter of a nurse and an international banker, Stroud grew up in Bramley, Surrey. She says she was shaped by seeing her mother serving Ugandan Asians, and later Vietnamese boat people, who sought asylum in Britain. Stroud received her secondary education at St Catherine's School, Bramley, going on to complete a Bachelor of Arts, studying French, at the University of Birmingham.

== Professional career ==
Stroud spent seventeen years in poverty-fighting projects and published a book on social injustice. In 1987-89 she worked in Hong Kong and Macau among the addict community. From 1989 to 1996 she pioneered a four-stage residential support project in Bedford enabling homeless people to move off the streets and to become contributing members of the community. From 2001 to 2003 Stroud developed a project to care for addicts, the homeless and those in debt in Birmingham.

== Politics ==
At the 2010 general election, Stroud stood as the Conservative parliamentary candidate for Sutton and Cheam, a marginal seat, but came second to the Liberal Democrat incumbent, Paul Burstow.

=== House of Lords ===
Philippa Stroud was made a life peer in October 2015. In 2018, she made speeches in the House of Lords on the topics of Human Trafficking, the European Union withdrawal bill and the Family Relationships bill. She has been an advocate of reducing poverty in the UK through her work at the Centre for Social Justice, the Legatum Institute and in the House of Lords.

In February 2018, she made a speech in support of the Family Relationships (Impact Assessment and Targets) Bill which would help ensure future Government policy would be assessed for its impact on family relationships. She argued that the UK has "one of the highest rates of family breakdown in Europe", and that family breakdowns entrenched poverty. Stroud believes family relationships should be a priority for Government to help reduce poverty, with the highest poverty rate being attributed to single parent families.

In March 2018, Stroud made an appeal for the UK to accept more refugee children into the UK and to reunite more children with their families. Her speech garnered support from Lord Judd, Lord Tunnicliffe and Lord Hope, who supported for her call for Britain to remain compassionate in its approach to accepting refugees.

In 2020, Stroud became a steering committee member of the lockdown-skeptic COVID Recovery Group, alongside a group of Conservative MPs who opposed the UK government's December 2020 lockdown.

=== Organisations ===
In 2003, alongside Iain Duncan Smith, Tim Montgomerie and Mark Florman, Stroud co-founded the Centre for Social Justice, which argues its 'vision is to for those living in the poorest and most disadvantaged communities across Britain to be given every opportunity to flourish and reach their full potential'.

After the 2010 general election, Stroud was appointed as a Special Adviser to the Secretary of State for Work and Pensions, Iain Duncan Smith. This came as billions of pounds were stripped from the social security budget, and so she worked to help create and implement the Government's welfare reforms, including the launch of universal credit. She returned to the Centre for Social Justice in 2015. In 2016, the Centre for Social Justice suggested that "life chance risks", including growing up in a single-parent household or by parents mired in debt, should be taken into account when assessing whether families could be classed as living in poverty. Stroud claimed that, "we need to look beyond the household income to work out the condition the children are growing up in."

Stroud became the chief executive officer of the Legatum Institute in October 2016. Under her leadership, the think tank has promoted research and ideas demonstrating the opportunities and potential solutions for the UK's trade policies post-Brexit. However, the Institute now focuses more broadly on the benefits of global trade through its Special Trade Commission.

In 2016, Stroud founded the Social Metrics Commission (SMC) with the aim to create a new UK poverty measure to replace the previous official measure abolished by the Conservative government in 2015. In September 2018 the SMC, led by Stroud, published a report using the new measure of poverty for the UK which went beyond the former official measure (which focused solely on income) by including core living costs such as housing, childcare and disability into the equation. The report found that 14.4 million people were living in poverty in 2017, including 4.5 million children. Stroud called on the Government to use this new measure to focus efforts and attention on creating policies and solutions to alleviate poverty levels in the UK.

In December 2023, Stroud was chosen by Kemi Badenoch to become the next chair of the Low Pay Commission, replacing Bryan Sanderson. She will take up this role from 1 January 2024, and will serve a three-year term as chair of the commission, which advises the Government on both the living and minimum wage.

=== Elections ===
Stroud has twice been a Conservative candidate in a general election: she came third in Birmingham Ladywood in 2005; and on 6 May 2010, as candidate for Sutton and Cheam, she came second to incumbent Liberal Democrat Paul Burstow.

== Personal life ==
Stroud is a mother of three children (twin daughters and a son) who are now adults, and in 2023 was a grandmother of two. She lives in south-west London with her husband David Stroud, who leads ChristChurch London.
