= Daniel Burston =

Psychologist and author

Daniel Burston is a psychologist and author. He is an associate professor of psychology at Duquesne University.

He received a PhD in Social & Political Thought from York University in 1985 and a PhD in psychology from York University in 1989.

== Books ==
- The Legacy of Erich Fromm (Harvard University Press, 1991)
- The Wing of Madness: The Life and Work of R. D. Laing (Harvard University Press, 1996)
- The Crucible of Experience: R. D. Laing and the Crisis of Psychotherapy (Harvard University Press, 2000)
- with Roger Frie Psychotherapy as a Human Science (Duquesne University Press, 2006)
- Erik Erikson and the American Psyche: Ego, Ethics and Evolution (Jason Aronson, 2007)
- A Forgotten Freudian: The Passion of Karl Stern (Karnac, 2016)
