= Maurice Dongier =

Maurice Dongier (1925 – 2015) was a Canadian neuropsychiatrist at the Douglas Hospital Research Centre in Montreal, Quebec. He was a Knight (Chevalier) of the French Legion of Honour as well as a connoisseur of wine and fine cooking. Dongier is a founding member of the Société française de Psycho-oncologie (French Society for Psycho-oncology).

== Education and career ==
Dongier received his medical degree in Marseille in 1951 and took his training at the Allan Memorial Institute in Montreal, Quebec, receiving his diploma in psychiatry from McGill University in 1954. He was a pioneer in providing psychiatric services to remote communities, using his own private plane to reach them. Dongier also flew his plane from Montreal to St. Kitts with a colleague to study the behavior of alcoholic monkeys there, whose behavior is similar to that of people with alcohol abuse problems.

Dongier held positions at the Université de Marseille (France) and the Université de Liège (Belgium). On his return from Europe in 1971, he went back to McGill as director of the Allan Memorial Institute and also served as Psychiatrist-in-Chief for the Royal Victoria Hospital, Montreal. Dongier was also the chairman of McGill's Department of Psychiatry from 1974 to 1985.

Dongier was honored in 2002 by an award named for him: the Maurice Dongier Training Award; the award is for psychiatric clinical research training. In 2005, he was awarded an Emeritus Professorship in psychiatry by McGill University.

Dongier is well known for his research in alcohol abuse and work in alcohol abuse research.
