= An Act to amend the Canadian Human Rights Act and the Criminal Code =

Canadian federal law relating to gender identity

Parliament of Canada
- Citation: SC 2017, c. 13
- Passed by: House of Commons
- Passed: 18 November 2016
- Passed by: Senate
- Passed: 15 June 2017
- Royal assent: 19 June 2017
- Commenced: 19 June 2017

Legislative history

Initiating chamber: House of Commons
- Bill citation: C-16, 42nd Parliament, 1st Session
- Introduced by: Jody Wilson-Raybould, Minister of Justice
- First reading: 17 May 2016
- Second reading: 18 October 2016
- Third reading: 18 November 2016

Revising chamber: Senate
- First reading: 22 November 2016
- Second reading: 2 March 2017
- Third reading: 15 June 2017
- Status: In force

An Act to amend the Canadian Human Rights Act and the Criminal Code (French: Loi modifiant la Loi canadienne sur les droits de la personne et le Code criminel) is a law passed in 2017 by the Parliament of Canada. It was introduced as Bill C-16 of the first session of the 42nd Parliament. The law adds gender expression and gender identity as protected grounds to the Canadian Human Rights Act, and also to the Criminal Code provisions dealing with hate propaganda, incitement to genocide, and aggravating factors in sentencing.

== Introduction and legislative history ==
The bill was introduced on 17 May 2016 by Justin Trudeau's Liberal government as Bill C-16 of the first session of the 42nd Parliament. It passed in the House of Commons by 248–40 votes and in the Senate by 67–11 votes with three abstentions. The bill became law upon receiving royal assent on 19 June 2017, coming into force immediately.

== Summary ==
The Library of Parliament summarized the bill as follows:

The bill is intended to protect individuals from discrimination within the sphere of federal jurisdiction and from being the targets of hate propaganda, as a consequence of their gender identity or their gender expression. The bill adds "gender identity or expression" to the list of prohibited grounds of discrimination in the Canadian Human Rights Act and the list of characteristics of identifiable groups protected from hate propaganda in the Criminal Code. It also adds that evidence that an offence was motivated by bias, prejudice or hate based on a person's gender identity or expression constitutes an aggravating circumstance for a court to consider when imposing a criminal sentence.

== Amendments to the Canadian Human Rights Act ==
The law amends the Canadian Human Rights Act by adding "gender identity or expression" as a prohibited ground of discrimination. That makes it illegal to deny services, employment, accommodation and similar benefits to individuals based on their gender identity or gender expression to matters within federal jurisdiction, such as the federal government, federal services to the public, or a federally regulated industry. A person who denies benefits because of the gender identity or gender expression of another person could be liable to provide monetary reimbursement.

== Amendments to the Criminal Code ==
The law amends the Criminal Code by adding "gender identity or expression" to the definition of "identifiable group" in section 318 of the Code. Section 318 makes it a criminal offence to advocate or promote genocide against members of an identifiable group, which now includes gender identity or gender expression. Since the definition of "identifiable group" is also used in section 319 of the Code, the amendment also makes it a criminal offence to incite or promote hatred because of gender identity or gender expression.

The law also adds "gender identity or expression" to section 718.2 of the Criminal Code. This section is part of the sentencing provisions and makes gender identity and gender expression an aggravating factor in sentencing, leading to increased sentences for individuals who commit crimes motivated by bias, prejudice or hate based on gender identity or expression.

== Predecessor bills ==
The law is the most recent iteration of several proposed bills introduced to previous parliaments. In 2005, New Democratic Party member of Parliament Bill Siksay introduced a bill in the House of Commons to explicitly add "gender identity or expression" as prohibited grounds of discrimination in the Canadian Human Rights Act. He reintroduced the bill in 2006. In May 2009, he introduced it again, with additional provisions to add gender identity and gender expression to the hate crimes provisions of the Criminal Code. In February 2011, it passed third reading in the House of Commons with support from all parties but was not considered in the Senate before Parliament was dissolved for the 41st Canadian federal election. Two bills, C-276 and C-279, on the subject were introduced in the 41st Canadian Parliament by both the Liberals and the NDP, respectively. The NDP's Bill C-279 passed second reading on 6 June 2012. However, that bill also died on the Senate order paper when the 2015 federal election was called.

== Reception ==
The Canadian Bar Association supported the passage of the bill by writing a detailed letter to the Chair of the Standing Senate Committee on Legal and Constitutional Affairs. Speaking for the CBA, the president, René J. Basque, argued that the bill would provide necessary protections for transgender people, made explicit the protections for transgender people which were already contained in the prohibition on discrimination based on sexual orientation, and did not pose any risk to freedom of expression.

Following the introduction of the bill in the House of Commons, but before introduction in the Senate, an online survey on C-16 conducted by the Angus Reid Institute found that 84 percent of the 1,416 adult Canadians surveyed said they support adding "gender identity as a prohibited ground for discrimination under the Canadian Human Rights Act" while 16% opposed.

Jordan Peterson, a professor of psychology at the University of Toronto, criticized the bill, saying that it would compel speech. Peterson argued that the law would classify the failure to use preferred pronouns of transgender people as hate speech. According to legal experts, including law professors Brenda Cossman of the University of Toronto and Kyle Kirkup of the University of Ottawa, not using preferred pronouns would not meet legal standards for the Criminal Code offence of promoting hatred. Men's rights activist and trans woman Theryn Meyer also critiqued the bill and appeared at a hearing on the bill at the Canadian senate.

According to Cossman, accidental misuse of a pronoun would be unlikely to constitute discrimination under the Canadian Human Rights Act, but "repeatedly, consistently refus[ing] to use a person's chosen pronoun" might. Commercial litigator Jared Brown said that imprisonment would be possible if a complaint were made to the Canadian Human Rights Tribunal, the Tribunal found discrimination had occurred, the Tribunal ordered a remedy, the person refused to comply with the order, a contempt proceeding were brought in court, and the court ordered the person imprisoned until the contempt had been purged (though he thought such a scenario was unlikely).

In November 2017, Lindsay Shepherd, a teaching assistant at Wilfrid Laurier University who showed a video of Peterson's critique of Bill C-16 in her "Canadian Communication in Context" class, was reprimanded by faculty members, who said that she may have violated Bill C-16 by showing the video and holding a debate. Commenting on the incident, Cossman noted that the Canadian Human Rights Act (which C-16 amended) does not apply to universities, and that it would be unlikely for a court to find that the teaching assistant's actions were discriminatory under the comparable portions of the Ontario Human Rights Code.

In 2018, a year after the bill came into force, a spokesperson for the federal Department of Justice, stated that he was not aware of anyone being jailed for using misgendered pronouns. Cheryl Milne, director of the Asper Centre for Constitutional Rights at the University of Toronto, stated that malicious use of misgendering pronouns could be part of the evidence to demonstrate an overall pattern of discrimination, but sending someone to jail is not a possible outcome for human rights complaints. "If it's just the pronoun, not much is going to happen", Milne stated. AFP Fact Check stated that same year that a review of the Canadian legal databases did not show any case of an individual being sent to jail for misusing gender pronouns.
