= Maps of Meaning =

1999 book by Jordan Peterson

Maps of Meaning: The Architecture of Belief
- Author: Jordan Peterson
- Audio read by: Jordan Peterson
- Language: English
- Subject: Psychology; meaning
- Published: 26 March 1999
- Publisher: Routledge
- Publication place: Canada
- Media type: Print
- Pages: 564
- ISBN: 978-0415922227

Maps of Meaning: The Architecture of Belief is a 1999 book by Canadian clinical psychologist and psychology professor Jordan Peterson. The book describes a theory for how people construct meaning, in a way that is compatible with the modern scientific understanding of how the brain functions. It examines the "structure of systems of belief and the role those systems play in the regulation of emotion", using "multiple academic fields to show that connecting myths and beliefs with science is essential to fully understand how people make meaning".

== Background and writing ==
Peterson spent more than 13 years writing the book in an attempt to "explain the meaning of history". In it, he briefly reflects on his childhood and on being raised in a Christian family. The responses to his questions about the literal truth of Biblical stories seemed ignorant, causing him to lose interest in attending church. During adolescence and early adulthood he tried finding the answer to "the general social and political insanity and evil of the world" (from Cold War to totalitarianism) and for a short period of time he embraced socialism and political science. Finding himself unsatisfied and falling into a depression, he discovered inspiration in the ideas of Carl Jung and decided to pursue psychology.

Peterson began to write Maps of Meaning in the mid-1980s, and used text from it (then titled as The Gods of War) during his classes teaching as an assistant professor of psychology at Harvard University. He initially intended to use it in an application for academic tenure at Harvard, but found that he was not emotionally up to the task, nor was he "in the position to make the strongest case for myself". The prospect of steady employment was attractive as he had two children by then, and so he decided to accept an offer from the University of Toronto in 1998.

According to Craig Lambert, writing in Harvard Magazine, the book is influenced by Jung's archetypal ideas about the collective unconscious and evolutionary psychology. It includes theories of religion and God, natural origin of modern culture, and the bibliography includes Dante Alighieri, Hannah Arendt, Fyodor Dostoevsky, Northrop Frye, Johann Wolfgang von Goethe, the Brothers Grimm, Stephen Hawking, Laozi, Konrad Lorenz, Alexander Luria, John Milton, Friedrich Nietzsche, Jean Piaget, B. F. Skinner, Aleksandr Solzhenitsyn, Voltaire, and Ludwig Wittgenstein among many others.

== Release ==
The book was first published in 1999 by Routledge, with the hardcover edition following in 2002. During its initial release, the book barely sold over a hundred copies. The unabridged audiobook edition was released on 12 June 2018, by Random House Audio. A month after its release, the audiobook debuted on the 4th place of the monthly category "Audio Nonfiction" by The New York Times Best Seller list.

In 2004, a 13-part TV series based on Peterson's book Maps of Meaning: The Architecture of Belief aired on TVOntario.

== Content ==
According to Peterson, his main goal was to examine why both individuals and groups participate in social conflict, exploring the reasoning and motivation individuals take to support their belief systems (i.e., ideological identification) that eventually results in killing and pathological atrocities like the Gulag, the Holocaust, and the Rwandan genocide. He considers that an "analysis of the world's religious ideas might allow us to describe our essential morality and eventually develop a universal system of morality".

In line with Peterson's reasoning, there exists a struggle between chaos (characteristic of the unknown, e.g. nature) and order (characteristic of explored, mapped territory, e.g. culture). Humans with their capability of abstract thinking also make abstract territoriality—the belief systems that "regulate our emotions". A potential threat to an important belief triggers emotional reactions, which are potentially followed by pathological attempts to face internal chaos, despite that "people generally prefer war to be something external, rather than internal … than re-forming our challenged beliefs". The principle in-between is logos (consciousness), and heroic figures are those who develop the culture and society as intermediaries between these two natural forces. In that sense, the "myth represents the eternal unknown … known … knower", the latter being the hero who "slays the dragon of chaos" like Saint George, resulting in "maturity in the form of individuality". Throughout the book, Peterson attempts to explain how the mind works, while including illustrations with elaborate geometric diagrams (e.g. "The Constituent Elements of Experience as Personality, Territory, and Process").

== Reception ==
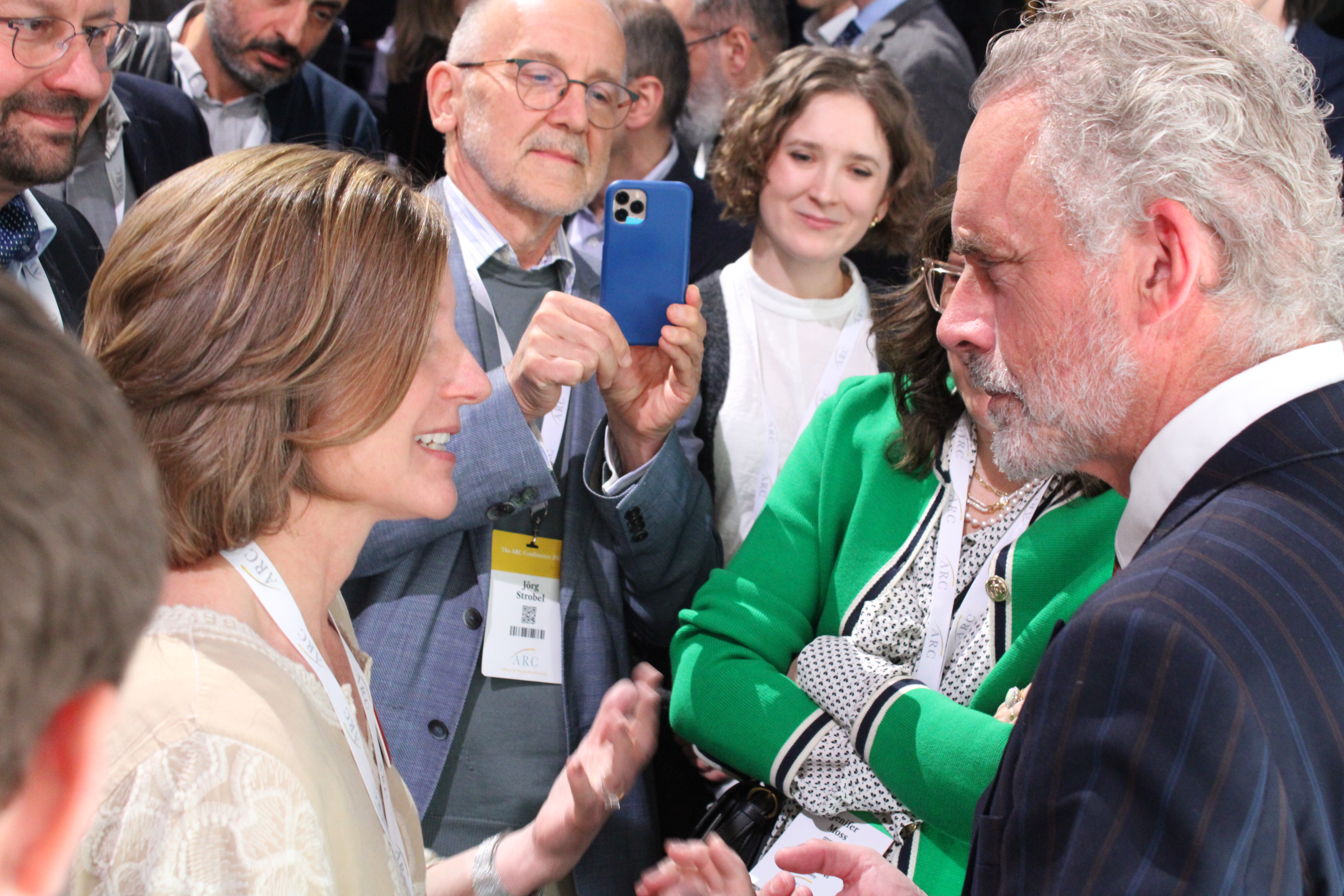
Jordan Peterson, the book's author, in conversation with Kimberly Ells, 2025

One of relatively few reviews of the book upon release was from Sheldon H. White from Harvard University, who praised it as a "brilliant enlargement of our understanding of human motivation."

Professor of psychiatry Dan Blazer, in the American Journal of Psychiatry (2000), emphasized that it "is not a book to be abstracted and summarized. Rather, it should be read at leisure (although it is anything but light reading) and employed as a stimulus and reference to expand one's own maps of meaning." Maxine Sheets-Johnstone, writing for Psycoloquy (2000), described it as an "original, provocative, complex, and fascinating book, which is also at times conceptually troubling, unduly repetitive, and exasperating in its format"; however, the "positive values of the book far outweigh its detractions."

Harvey Shepard, writing in the religion column of the Montreal Gazette (2003), stated:

To me, the book reflects its author's profound moral sense and vast erudition in areas ranging from clinical psychology to scripture and a good deal of personal soul searching … Peterson's vision is both fully informed by current scientific and pragmatic methods, and in important ways deeply conservative and traditional.

Psychologists Ralph W. Hood, Peter C. Hill, and Bernard Spilka, in their book The Psychology of Religion: An Empirical Approach (2009), state concerning the relationship of the five-factor model to religion, that the "dynamic model for the tension between tradition and transformation has been masterfully explored by Peterson (1999) as the personality basis for what he terms the architecture of belief."

In 2017, feminist academic Camille Paglia commented on the link between Maps of Meaning and her own book, Sexual Personae (1990).

According to Peterson, until 2018 there had been a lack of serious critique, and he did not "think people had any idea what to make of the book." In 2018, professor of philosophy Paul Thagard gave the book a highly negative review in a Psychology Today blog post, describing it as murky and arguing that it is "defective as a work of anthropology, psychology, philosophy, and politics."

Nathan J. Robinson, in an article in his left-wing publication Current Affairs, described the book as "an elaborate, unprovable, unfalsifiable, unintelligible theory."
