= Meaning (psychology) =

Epistemological concept used in multiple disciplines

Meaning is an epistemological concept used in multiple disciplines, such as psychology, philosophy, linguistics, semiotics, and sociology, with its definition depending upon the field of study by which it is being used.

These multidisciplinary uses of the term are not independent and can more or less overlap; each construction of the term meaning can correspond with related constructions in other fields. The logical positivists, for example, associated meaning with scientific verification.

== Behaviorism ==
According to B. F. Skinner, meaning is the modern version of idea. Like an idea, a meaning is said to be expressed or communicated by an utterance. A meaning explains the occurrence of a particular word in the sense that if there had been a different meaning to be expressed, a different word would probably have appeared. Meaning has certain advantages over ideas because they have the possibility to be located outside the skin, and thus, according to Skinner, meanings can be observed directly.

== Cognitive psychology ==
Jerome Bruner, one of the founding fathers of cognitive psychology, wrote:

Very early on,...emphasis began shifting from 'meaning' to 'information', from the construction of meaning to the processing of information. These are profoundly different matters. The key factor in the shift was the introduction of computation as the ruling metaphor and of computability as a necessary criterion of a good theoretical model. Information is indifferent with respect to meaning...

== Neuropsychology ==
Walter Jackson Freeman III, an American neuropsychologist, analysed neuroelectrodynamics of the brain and the process of meaning development. From his experiments and application of nonlinear dynamics, Freeman described the development of chaotic attractors in neurodynamics as dispositions to attribute a specific set of meanings, with the final decision occurring after the encounter with the events. This was in line with Jerome Bruner idea of cognitive hypotheses ("models") that people form when they attribute meaning to objects and events.

== Differential psychology ==
Experimental investigation of cognitive biases associated with sex and temperament differences showed that these biologically-based characteristics can influence meaning attribution.

Thus, in these studies males with stronger motor-physical endurance estimated abstractions describing people-, work/reality- and time-related concepts in more positive terms than males with a weaker endurance. Females with stronger social or physical endurance estimated social attractors in more positive terms than weaker females. Both male and female temperament groups with higher sociability showed a universal positive bias in their estimations of social concepts, in comparison to participants with lower sociability

In terms of temperament (biologically-based traits), people showed a tendency to attribute meaning to common adjectives and abstract and neutral nouns depending on their physical or verbal endurance, physical or verbal tempo, plasticity, and emotionality

== German critical psychology ==
German critical psychology provides a metatheoretical framework for research on both psychological and computational tasks. One important part of this is the logical-historical development of the meaning category. It is shown that meaning is nothing absolute but subjective. Meaning is neither a property of things nor only present as an imagination of cognition. Thus, meanings cannot be "defined" or "assigned" as commonly thought. Meanings arise from societal production of use-value."

A similar understanding developed in cultural studies of science: "Cultural studies thereby articulate dynamic, expressive conceptions of meaning, knowledge, and power, which contrast sharply with the standard approaches to these phenomena within philosophy and social theory. On such accounts, meaning is not a property of utterances or actions; the term `meaning' instead articulates the ways in which such performances inferentially draw upon and transform the field of prior performances in which they are situated."

== See also ==
- Ideasthesia
- Meaning (disambiguation)
- Meaning (philosophy)
