= Fisk (TV series) =

Australian TV comedy series

- Genre: Comedy
- Created by: Kitty Flanagan; Vincent Sheehan
- Written by: Kitty Flanagan; Penny Flanagan
- Directed by: Kitty Flanagan; Tom Peterson
- Starring: Kitty Flanagan; Marty Sheargold; Julia Zemiro; Aaron Chen; Glenn Butcher; John Gaden
- Composer: Kit Warhurst
- Country of origin: Australia
- Original language: English
- No. of series: 3
- No. of episodes: 18

Production
- Executive producers: Greg Sitch; Liz Watts; Anita Sheehan; Todd Abbott; Brett Sleigh
- Producer: Vincent Sheehan
- Cinematography: Joanne Donahoe-Beckwith
- Camera setup: Multi-camera
- Running time: 26—28 minutes
- Production companies: Porchlight Films; Origma Productions

Original release
- Network: ABC TV
- Release: 17 March 2021 – present

Fisk is an Australian television comedy series on ABC Television, which first aired on 17 March 2021. The second season aired in 2022, and the third premiered in 2024. It is also broadcast on Netflix and by other outlets around the world. The series was co-created by comedian Kitty Flanagan and Vincent Sheehan, and co-written by Flanagan with her sister Penny Flanagan. It takes its name from its central character Helen Tudor-Fisk, who joins a small legal firm after returning to her hometown, Melbourne. It stars Flanagan as Fisk, alongside Marty Sheargold, Julia Zemiro, Aaron Chen, Glenn Butcher, and John Gaden.

== Premise ==
The series revolves around the life of lawyer Helen Tudor-Fisk, who leaves Sydney for Melbourne after her career and marriage fall apart. She then finds work at a small solicitor firm that specialises in probate law and wills. The firm, Gruber & Gruber, is run by siblings Ray and Roz, assisted by probate clerk/"webmaster" George.

In the third season, Tudor-Fisk is a partner in the rebranded Gruber & Fisk, while Roz is continuing with her career in mediation. Ray has a new romantic interest, Melissa, a fashion psychologist, while George is engaging in "side hustles" with his grandmother.

== Cast ==
=== Main ===
- Kitty Flanagan as Helen Tudor-Fisk
- Marty Sheargold as Ray Gruber, a partner at the firm of Gruber & Gruber
- Julia Zemiro as Rosalind 'Roz' Gruber, Ray's sister and a partner at the firm of Gruber & Gruber who is suspended during the first series
- Aaron Chen as George Chen, the probate clerk whom Helen often addresses as "Webmaster" by his insistence
- John Gaden as Anthony Fisk, Helen's father and retired Supreme Court judge
- Glenn Butcher as Viktor aka 'Tip', Anthony's husband and former tipstaff
- Debra Lawrance as May, Helen's aunty (Series 1)
- George Henare as Graham, May's husband (Series 1)
- Gabrielle Chan as Lily, George's Grandma (Series 3)

=== Guests ===
- Alex Papps as Petro (2 episodes)
- Alison Whyte as Ruth (1 episode)
- Anne Edmonds as Anne (4 episodes)
- Bert La Bonté as William G.H Ford (1 episode)
- Bessie Holland as Fun Peggy (2 episodes)
- Brett Climo as Sergeant McCabe (1 episode)
- Broden Kelly as Simon Bramovich (1 episode)
- Carl Barron as Murray (2 episodes)
- Claudia Karvan as Vicki (1 episode)
- Colette Mann as Mrs Popovitch / Irma (2 episodes)
- Colin Lane as David Bunting (1 episode)
- Daniela Farinacci as Gina (1 episode)
- Danielle Walker as Gaynor (1 episode)
- Dave O'Neil as Bob (3 episodes)
- Deborah Kennedy as Edith (1 episode)
- Denise Scott as Leslie (2 episodes)
- Ed Kavalee as Blayden (1 episode)
- Georgina Naidu as Alice Pike (2 episodes)
- Geraldine Hickey as Gwen (2 episodes)
- Gina Riley as Maureen MacIntyre (1 episode)
- Glenn Ridge as MC (1 episode)
- Glenn Robbins as Dean (3 episodes)
- Jane Clifton as Jean (1 episode)
- Jessica Redmayne as Kellie-Joy (1 episode)
- Justine Clarke as Melissa (3 episodes)
- Libby Tanner as Annabelle (1 episode)
- Linda Bull as Acapella SOS Choir / Tina (2 episodes)
- Lucy Durack as Acapella SOS Choir (1 episode)
- Marg Downey as Lindy (2 episodes)
- Matt Okine as Theo (1 episode)
- Mel Buttle as Nerida (1 episode)
- Nath Valvo as Waiter (1 episode)
- Rachael Maza as Bridget (1 episode)
- Ray O'Leary as Casper (1 episode)
- Rhys Nicholson as Leo / Male Assistant (2 episodes)
- Richard Davies as Brandon (1 episode)
- Rob Sitch as Ronald (1 episode)
- Rohan Ganju as Michael / Brody (2 episodes)
- Sam Campbell as Bubby (1 episode)
- Sam Pang as Alex (1 episode)
- Shane Bourne as Howard (3 episodes)
- Stephen Curry as Nikolai (1 episode)
- Tom Ballard as Stefan Bogdanovich (2 episodes)

== Production ==
Producer Vincent Sheehan came up with the idea for setting a drama in a wills and probate office, and approached Kitty Flanagan, whom he had known for many years, to write the series. The series was co-written by Kitty Flanagan and her sister Penny Flanagan, and Kitty became the lead actor in the series. After having literary success with her 2019 book 488 Rules for Life: The Thankless Art of Being Correct, Kitty Flanagan realised that it was a rule book for her character, and may have been one of the reasons that ABC Television commissioned the series. The book was based on a skit Flanagan performed on The Weekly with Charlie Pickering, in which she satirised psychologist Jordan Peterson's self-help book 12 Rules for Life, saying that 12 rules were not enough - she had 488, and referred to a book she had written, which did not actually exist. After a publisher phoned her saying that bookshops were fielding multiple enquiries about the book, she wrote it.

There were questions about whether her character might be too unlikeable, but Flanagan cited her pedantry as one trait that made her relatable, and she worked on making her a rounded character over the six episodes of the first series.

The first series of Fisk was originally announced in late 2020 as Entitled. Filming took place in North Melbourne and other locations during the COVID-19 pandemic, with strict protocols on room density and proximity. Large groupings had to be avoided. In November 2021, it was announced that a second series had been commissioned by ABC (released 2022). In November 2023, it was announced that a third series had been commissioned by ABC (aired 2024).

All three series are co-created by Flanagan and Vincent Sheehan, co-written by Flanagan and her sister Penny Flanagan, and co-directed by Flanagan and Tom Peterson. Flanagan had worked with Peterson before, preparing five-minute segments for each episode The Weekly.

Sheehan did not return to write Season 3; however he co-produced it, along with Nicole Minchin.

It was reported in July 2026, that a fourth season of Fisk was entering production, with Kitty and Penny Flanagan writing scripts with the hopes of all the main cast reprising their roles. In October 2026, the series was officially confrimed to return for a fourth season in 2027.

== Episodes ==
Series	Episodes	Originally released	
Series	Episodes	First released	Last released
1	6	17 March 2021	21 April 2021
2	6	26 October 2022	30 November 2022
3	6	20 October 2024	24 November 2024

=== Series 1 (2021) ===
No. overall	No. in series	Title	Directed by	Written by	Original release date	Australian viewers
1	1	"Portrait of a Lady"	Kitty Flanagan, Tom Peterson	Kitty Flanagan, Penny Flanagan, Vincent Sheehan	17 March 2021	532,000
When Helen Tudor-Fisk's life in Sydney falls apart, she moves to Melbourne and takes a job in a small suburban law firm, Gruber & Gruber, specialising in wills and probate.
2	2	"Cremains of the Day"	Kitty Flanagan, Tom Peterson	Kitty Flanagan, Penny Flanagan, Vincent Sheehan	24 March 2021	515,000
Helen mediates a case about division of cremains, between a bereaved daughter and the new, much younger partner of her dead father, and has an awkward family lunch at Dad and Viktor's house. Helen gives the younger woman fake ashes in order to appease the mourning daughter.
3	3	"Taken"	Kitty Flanagan, Tom Peterson	Kitty Flanagan, Penny Flanagan, Vincent Sheehan	31 March 2021	594,000
Helen meets with a woman who is demanding power of attorney over her mother and attends her ex-husband William's writer's festival run by literary interlocutor Lindy Baxter-Smythe.
4	4	"Dead Man Texting"	Kitty Flanagan, Tom Peterson	Kitty Flanagan, Penny Flanagan, Vincent Sheehan	7 April 2021	561,000
The office is abuzz because their favourite temp Peggy is coming in to help out with a deceased estate. Helen doesn't understand what's so fun about Fun Peggy, but everyone else, including George, thinks she's a hoot. After Helen's client reveals that she is receiving text messages from her dead husband, Helen finds a company called BTG Holdings which is sending the texts. Helen also attempts to prepare for court for the first time.
5	5	"Ladies in Black"	Kitty Flanagan, Tom Peterson	Kitty Flanagan, Penny Flanagan, Vincent Sheehan	14 April 2021	537,000
Helen meets formidable opposing counsel Alice Pike, and stumbles upon Roz's passion project: an all-woman harmony group for funerals called The Sadrigals. Alice Pike makes a complaint to the board about Roz.
6	6	"Honour Thy Father"	Kitty Flanagan, Tom Peterson	Kitty Flanagan, Penny Flanagan, Vincent Sheehan	21 April 2021	542,000
Gruber and Associates are preparing for the local business awards and their visit by a mystery judge. Helen realises that her job is under threat because of Roz's suspension coming to an end, as well as dealing with Petro who believes he is the illegitimate son of the late newsreader Georgios Papadakis.

=== Series 2 (2022) ===
No. overall	No. in series	Title	Directed by	Written by	Original release date	Australian viewers
7	1	"Goddamn Flim-Flam Man"	Kitty Flanagan, Tom Peterson	Kitty Flanagan, Penny Flanagan, Vincent Sheehan	26 October 2022	543,000
Helen has to deal with a nuisance claim from a client's tenant. George begins livestreaming a demolition simulation game. The office begins using their brand new photocopier to Helen's annoyance and Ray's unlikely benefit.
8	2	"Faithful Friends Are Hard To Find"	Kitty Flanagan, Tom Peterson	Kitty Flanagan, Penny Flanagan, Vincent Sheehan	2 November 2022	484,000
Roz announces a new business venture and Ray entrusts Helen with the firm's most prestigious client. Helen meets with an influencer who wants to make a video will and George receives a gift..
9	3	"Pancakes and Prayer"	Kitty Flanagan, Tom Peterson	Kitty Flanagan, Penny Flanagan, Vincent Sheehan	9 November 2022	430,000
Helen meets with two estranged brothers to broker a compromise over their mother's will, while Ray and George try to get rid of a rogue pigeon. Dad and Viktor worry that Helen doesn't have a social life.
10	4	"A Very Handsome Woman"	Kitty Flanagan, Tom Peterson	Kitty Flanagan, Penny Flanagan, Vincent Sheehan	16 November 2022	457,000
Helen steps up to do Ray's regular probate information talk at the local library and Roz is pursued by a gentleman caller. Helen searches for a priceless family heirloom that has gone missing in an estate clean up.
11	5	"Judges Are Like Chimpanzees"	Kitty Flanagan, Tom Peterson	Kitty Flanagan, Penny Flanagan, Vincent Sheehan	23 November 2022	500,000
George is overworked and Roz is having trouble finding a suitable assistant. Helen needs to ascertain the correct beneficiary of a large charity bequest and has to take the matter to court.
12	6	"Snitches Get Riches"	Kitty Flanagan, Tom Peterson	Kitty Flanagan, Penny Flanagan, Vincent Sheehan	30 November 2022	497,000
Helen meets with a May-December couple to change their wills; Petro drops by to give Helen some news; a scandal erupts around Gruber & Associates. Viktor joins as Roz's assistant.

=== Series 3 (2024) ===
No. overall	No. in series	Title	Directed by	Written by	Original release date	Australian viewers
13	1	"Bees in the Hive"	Kitty Flanagan, Tom Peterson	Kitty Flanagan, Penny Flanagan	20 October 2024	1,049,000
When Ray is distracted by love and Roz suffers a crisis of confidence, Helen must step up and right the ship. Viktor quits his job as Roz's assistant.
14	2	"Burning Up"	Kitty Flanagan, Tom Peterson	Kitty Flanagan, Penny Flanagan	27 October 2024	862,000
Helen finds herself obligated to return the favour when a pushy member of the networking group keeps sending her clients; George's grandma takes over the Conch reception desk and helps George with a presentation.
15	3	"I'm the Fisk"	Kitty Flanagan, Tom Peterson	Kitty Flanagan, Penny Flanagan	3 November 2024	888,000
When George's grandma quits the reception desk, Ray recommends his new lady love's son, Bubby, as a replacement; Melcome from Blendology needs Helen's help with his father's will.
16	4	"The Sandman is in the Building"	Kitty Flanagan, Tom Peterson	Kitty Flanagan, Penny Flanagan	10 November 2024	886,000
When a Conch client makes threats, Helen and Roz are forced to relocate to a co-working space called The Hub. At home, Helen's Dad has lost his licence and Helen is forced to act as Dad and Viktor's personal Uber driver.
17	5	"Red Wine and Evanescence"	Kitty Flanagan, Tom Peterson	Kitty Flanagan, Penny Flanagan	18 November 2024	891,000
Ray decides to propose to Mellie but she rejects it and Roz's mind begin to unravel after reading the google reviews of Conch Mediation; Helen has to manage their emotional problems. Ray decides to leave the firm after working it out with Mellie.
18	6	"Gal Pal O'Clock"	Kitty Flanagan, Tom Peterson	Kitty Flanagan, Penny Flanagan	24 November 2024	1,008,000
Ray brokers a deal for Furstenburg Gray to buy out Gruber & Fisk, Helen is plunged into crisis when they do not want her. In the end, Roz comes back to law and buys out Gruber & Fisk, keeping Helen and George. Helen's dad plans his funeral with Viktor's help.

== Broadcast ==
The first series went to air on ABC TV (Australia) from 17 March 2021. It also aired on the ABC streaming platform, iview.

The second series aired in 2022, and the third from 20 October 2024.

The first series has been streaming on Netflix since August 2023, the second series since December 2023 and third season in August 2025.

Since August 2025, all three series can also be streamed on ITVX in the United Kingdom.

== Reception ==
=== Critical reception ===
Kylie Northover of The Sydney Morning Herald gave the series debut 3.5 out of 5 stars. Luke Buckmaster in The Guardian gave the show 3 out of 5 stars, writing that the first episode was funnier than the rest.

=== Awards and nominations ===
In September 2021 Fisk won the Best Series Award in the comedies competition at Europe's largest TV festival, Series Mania, in Lille, France. It beat six other series chosen for the event, including the multi-Emmy-nominated series Hacks, from HBO.

Year	Award	Category	Nominee(s)	Result	Ref.
2021	AACTA Awards	Best Television Comedy Series	Fisk (Vincent Sheehan)	Won	
2021	AACTA Awards	Best Comedy Performer	Kitty Flanagan	Won	
2023	AACTA Awards	Best Television Comedy Series	Fisk	Nominated	
2023	AACTA Awards	Best Acting in a Comedy	Kitty Flanagan	Nominated	
2023	AACTA Awards	Best Acting in a Comedy	Julia Zemiro	Nominated	
2023	AACTA Awards	Best Original Music Score in Television	Episode 4 - Megan Washington & Daniel O'Brien	Nominated	
2024	AACTA Awards	Best Narrative Comedy Series	Fisk	Won	
2024	AACTA Awards	Best Acting in a Comedy	Kitty Flanagan	Won	
2024	AACTA Awards	Best Acting in a Comedy	Aaron Chen	Nominated	
2024	AACTA Awards	Best Screenplay in Television	Episode 3: "I'm the Fisk" - Penny Flanagan & Kitty Flanagan	Nominated	
2024	AACTA Awards	Best Editing in Television	Episode 3: "I'm the Fisk" - Katie Flaxman	Nominated	
2022	Logie Awards	Most Popular Actress	Kitty Flanagan	Won	
2022	Logie Awards	Most Popular Comedy Program	Fisk	Nominated	
2023	Logie Awards	Most Popular Actress	Kitty Flanagan	Won	
2023	Logie Awards	Most Popular Actress	Julia Zemiro	Nominated	
2023	Logie Awards	Most Popular Comedy Program	Fisk	Nominated	
2023	Logie Awards	Most Outstanding Comedy Program	Fisk	Nominated	
2025	Logie Awards	Best Lead Actress in a Comedy	Kitty Flanagan	Won	
2025	Logie Awards	Best Lead Actor in a Comedy	Aaron Chen	Won	
2025	Logie Awards	Best Supporting Actor	Glenn Butcher	Won	
2025	Logie Awards	Best Supporting Actress	Julia Zemiro	Won	
2025	Logie Awards	Best Scripted Comedy Program	Fisk	Won	
2026	AWGIE Awards	Comedy – Situation or Narrative	Penny Flanagan with Kitty Flanagan ("Burning Up")	Pending	

=== Viewership ===
The first episode of Fisk became highest-rated episode of any program excluding children's programs on ABC iView, and as of October 2021 the first series remained still the highest-rated non-children's program across the ABC network.

On Netflix, Fisk was in the top 10 most-viewed series in 10 countries, including South Africa, the UK, and the US.

Series 1

No.	Title	Air date	Overnight ratings		Consolidated ratings		Total viewers	Ref(s)
No.	Title	Air date	Viewers	Rank	Viewers	Rank	Total viewers	Ref(s)
1	"Portrait of a Lady"	17 March 2021	532,000	11	266,000	6	798,000	
2	"Cremains of the Day"	24 March 2021	515,000	10	295,000	6	810,000	
3	"Taken"	31 March 2021	594,000	10	279,000	6	873,000	
4	"Dead Man Texting"	7 April 2021	561,000	9	312,000	6	873,000	
5	"Ladies in Black"	14 April 2021	537,000	12	277,000	6	814,000	
6	"Honour Thy Father"	21 April 2021	542,000	11	265,000	6	807,000	

Series 2

No.	Title	Air date	Overnight ratings		Consolidated ratings		Total viewers	Ref(s)
No.	Title	Air date	Viewers	Rank	Viewers	Rank	Total viewers	Ref(s)
1	"Goddamn Flim-Flam Man"	26 October 2022	543,000	8	641,000	4	1,184,000	
2	"Faithful Friends Are Hard To Find"	2 November 2022	484,000	8	628,000	3	1,112,000	
3	"Pancakes and Prayer"	9 November 2022	430,000	10	564,000	3	994,000	
4	"A Very Handsome Woman"	16 November 2022	457,000	11	665,000	3	1,122,000	
5	"Judges Are Like Chimpanzees"	23 November 2022	500,000	6	606,000	3	1,106,000	
6	"Snitches Get Riches"	30 November 2022	497,000	7	597,000	3	1,094,000	

Series 3 (Note: In January 2024, OzTAM's television ratings system underwent a major change, removing consolidated ratings measurements in the previous sense.)

No.	Title	Air date	Overnight ratings		Ref(s)
No.	Title	Air date	Viewers	Rank	Ref(s)
1	"Bees in the Hive"	20 October 2024	1,049,000	9	
2	"Burning Up"	27 October 2024	862,000	12	
3	"I'm the Fisk"	3 November 2024	1,049,000	9	
4	"The Sandman is in the Building"	20 October 2024	1,049,000	9	

== Home media ==
The first series of Fisk was released in Australia on DVD on 30 June 2021 from Roadshow Entertainment.
