= Jim Tavaré =

English actor and comedian

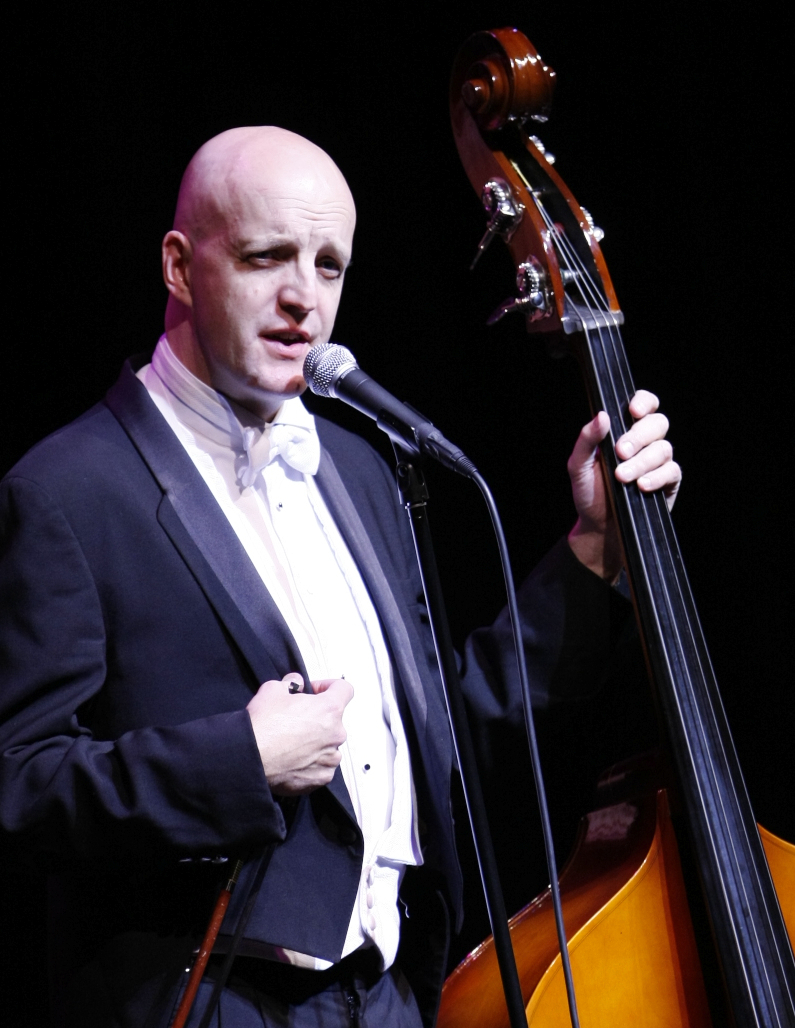
- Tavaré in 2008
- Born: Essex, England

Comedy career
- Years active: 1984 – present
- Medium: Stand-up, television
- Website: jimtavare.org

Jim Tavaré is a British stand-up comedian, actor, and musician. He is best known for his work on The Sketch Show on ITV, which won a BAFTA award. He played the role of Tom (the owner of the Leaky Cauldron) in Harry Potter and the Prisoner of Azkaban, and has appeared in several music videos, including Roots Manuva's "Too Cold", McFly's "It's All About You" (for BBC Comic Relief), Phoenix Foundation's "Thames Soup", and Letlive's "Banshee".

== Early life ==
Tavaré was born in Essex, England. He is a cousin of former international cricketer Chris Tavaré. When he was 7, he and his family moved to Cheshire, where he eventually attended art school in Northwich. After finishing his art studies, he moved to London, where he worked with Corin Redgrave. As a result, he successfully auditioned for and attended the Royal Academy of Dramatic Art, graduating in 1985 with an Acting (RADA Diploma).

== Career ==
Tavaré's first film appearance was as a student in Another Country (1984) with Rupert Everett and Colin Firth. Although uncredited, he was a featured extra appearing in numerous scenes throughout the film. Tavaré was Colin Firth's stand-in for the duration of the film. Charles Spencer, Diana, Princess of Wales's brother, was also an uncredited extra. Tavaré eventually branched out into stand-up comedy with a unique act which featured his double bass, an instrument he had learned to play during his childhood.

In 1995, Tavaré wrote and starred in a series of short silent films for BBC2, titled Jim Tavaré Pictures Presents. On Channel Five, he had a skit series of his own that he co-wrote with Ricky Gervais, called The Jim Tavaré Show. He appeared three times in the Royal Variety Performance, and subsequently worked for Prince Charles at several private engagements, including at a private Christmas party and at a gala held at Highgrove in front of Queen Elizabeth II and 13 other crowned heads of state. He became renowned in the UK as Prince Charles's favourite comedian. Following an appearance at the Montreal Just For Laughs festival, CBS commissioned a special episode "Take My Life Please" based on and written entirely around his comedy act, in the American series Wings

Tavaré co-wrote and appeared in the BAFTA-winning ITV series The Sketch Show, alongside Lee Mack, Tim Vine, Ronni Ancona, Karen Taylor, and Kitty Flanagan. In 2004, Tavaré appeared in Harry Potter and the Prisoner of Azkaban as Tom the Innkeeper. In 2008, he finished in fourth place on the American show Last Comic Standing 6, having been the only overseas act ever to have reached the final show. He performed a 63-date national tour with the other four Last Comic Standing finalists throughout the US. He appeared in the fifth series of the David Duchovny comedy-drama Californication, as an English butler to a hip-hop mogul played by Wu-Tang Clan frontman RZA. He made a guest-star appearance in season 5 of the comedy and spy drama Chuck, the TV show Jimmy Kimmel Live!, and on Comedy Central's Tosh.0. In September 2013, he began filming the role of The Dog Catcher alongside David Walliams, Jessica Hynes, and John Sessions in Syco Entertainment's feature film Pudsey: The Movie.

In 2017, Tavaré was in an intensive care unit after being injured in a collision with a car. After suffering catastrophic injuries (over 30 broken bones, including 14 broken ribs, collapsed lungs, multiple fractures, broken neck and a hand that detached from the wrist) Tavaré returned to the stage with a new show about his experiences entitled "From deadpan to bedpan".
