= Kitty Flanagan =

Australian comedian

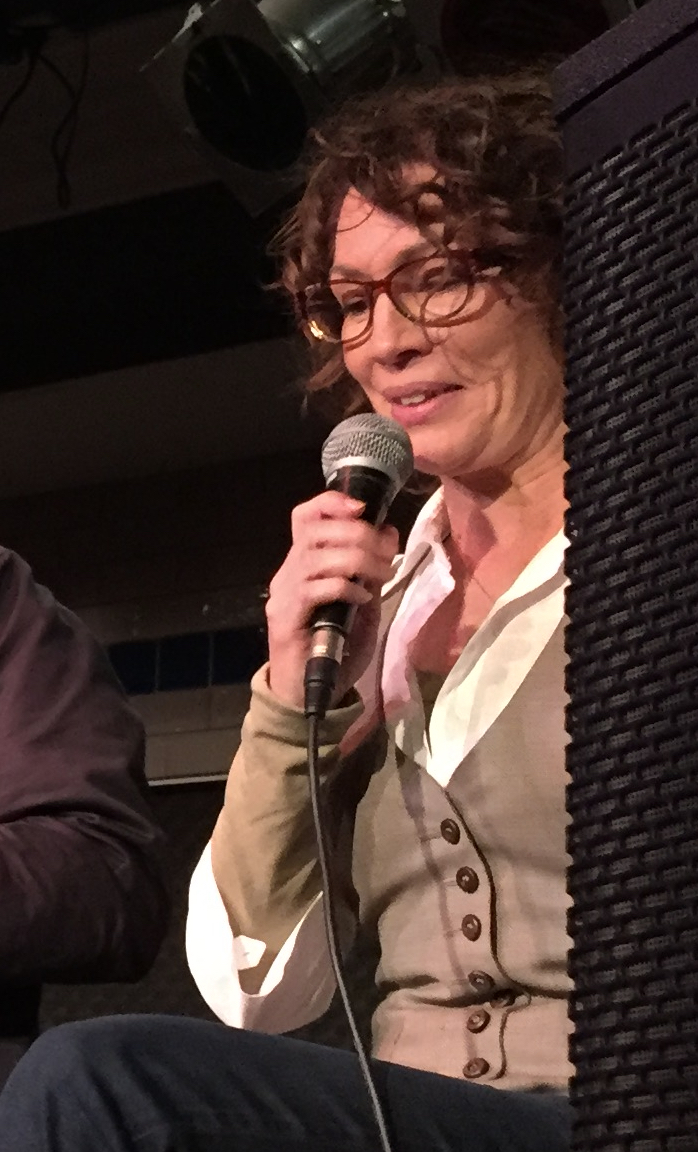
- Live at The Little Dum Dum Club podcast recording on 9 April 2017
- Born: 18 July 1968 (age 58); Sydney, New South Wales, Australia
- Notable work: Fisk; Utopia; The Weekly with Charlie Pickering; The Project; The Sketch Show; Full Frontal; Have You Been Paying Attention?
- Relatives: John Flanagan (father); Penny Flanagan (sister)

Comedy career
- Years active: 1989–present
- Medium: Stand-up comedian, writer, actress
- Genres: Sketch, autobiographical, observational, character
- Website: kittyflanagan.com

Kitty Flanagan (born 18 July 1968) is an Australian comedian, writer and actress. She is known for portraying Helen Tudor-Fisk in the television comedy program Fisk, which she also co-created, co-wrote and co-directed. Flanagan also starred as Rhonda Stewart in the comedy Utopia. She spent eight years based in the UK and performing around the world (2001–2009) and has performed at the Edinburgh Festival Fringe and Just For Laughs in Montreal, Canada. Flanagan won the AACTA Award for Best Comedy Performer in 2021 and has won the Silver Logie for four consecutive years in a row from 2022, for her work in Fisk and Utopia.

== Early life and education ==
Flanagan was born in Manly, a suburb in Sydney's north, in 1968. Her book 488 Rules For Life states that she grew up Catholic but later abandoned formal religion. She became drawn to comedy in Grade 5 when she appeared in a school musical production of Alice in Wonderland, in which she dressed as a bunny and pretended to fall asleep during the performance.

She attended high school at Monte Sant'Angelo Mercy College in North Sydney. She recalls that, as a teenager, she and her younger sister Penny would put on avant-garde performance shows involving their younger brother Michael by dressing him in tutus and giving him dance moves to do.

== Career ==
In Australia, Flanagan has appeared on various television series, including Full Frontal, The Project, Rove Live, The Weekly with Charlie Pickering, Have You Been Paying Attention?, Thank God You're Here and Sam Pang Tonight. In the United Kingdom she is known for her appearances on The Sketch Show.

=== Early career ===
At the age of 21, Flanagan road-tripped around Australia and liked Western Australia so much that she moved there and lived in the Perth suburb of Cottesloe for a couple of years and later lived in Bunbury and Geraldton. She occasionally read news and weather at a country radio station, waited tables and lasted only three weeks cleaning and packing crayfish in a Geraldton crayfish factory before she resigned. She trained and briefly worked as a physical education teacher before beginning a job in advertising.

In 1989, Flanagan began her five-year stint as an advertising agency copywriter, creating campaigns for products such as Quik chocolate drinking powder. After five years as a copywriter, she was fired in June 1993.

Following her exit from advertising, she worked as a bartender at a hotel where there was an open mic night, so she decided to try stand-up. Her first attempt was a success and she then started her comedy career in 1994 doing stand-up at an open mic night at the Harold Park Hotel in Sydney. Her debut performance at the hotel led to a spot in the final of the hotel's Comic of the Year competition where she placed third and won a bottle of red wine. She also performed at The Comedy Store in Sydney.

Flanagan had been doing stand-up comedy for six months before she was spotted in December 1994 by the producer of Full Frontal. Flanagan joined the cast as both a writer and performer in 1995. She left the show in late 1996 to concentrate on her stand-up while she continued writing and acting for television in Shaun Micallef's World Around Him, The Micallef Program, The 50 Foot Show and The Fat.

=== 2001–2009: UK and the world ===
Flanagan moved to the UK in 2001 to further her comedy career and do more stand-up. She performed on television in The Sketch Show as well as making numerous stand-up appearances on The World Stands Up for Comedy Central. As well as performing, she produced a short film, Dating Ray Fenwick, in which she also had a small role and also wrote material for her former Sketch Show co-star Karen Taylor's sketch comedy show Touch Me, I'm Karen Taylor. She also wrote for various other shows on the BBC, Channel Four and Sky Television. She also worked with author and screenwriter Sean Condon to develop his screwball comedy script Splitsville as a hook for a television series, which later evolved into an e-book. During her time in the UK, she regularly returned to Australia for short visits and appearances on television shows including Rove, Good News Week, Spicks and Specks and The Sideshow.

Flanagan took her stand-up internationally and performed at many major comedy festivals, including Edinburgh, Melbourne, Montreal, Kilkenny, Cape Town and Johannesburg.

=== 2009–2020: Rise in popularity ===
After eight years touring internationally and performing in comedy clubs in England, she returned to live in Australia in 2009. She had three months worth of work lined up in Australia and more kept coming in so she decided to stay. She starred in the Comedy Channel's 2009 TV special I Can't Believe It's Not Better before joining The Project for segments on trending news topics.

In 2010, Flanagan toured Australia with her stand-up comedy show Charming and Alarming. She toured with her sister and show co-star Penny Flanagan and tour manager and former Full Frontal co-star Glenn Butcher, the founding member of the 1980s Newcastle comedy troupe the Castanet Club.

In 2013, Flanagan toured Australia in the stand-up show Hello Kitty Flanagan.

In 2013, while in Montreal to perform Hello Kitty Flanagan, she appeared as a guest comedian on a television special hosted by Wil Anderson called Wil Does Montreal: Just For Laughs which explored what goes on behind the scenes of Montreal's Just for Laughs international comedy festival and featured some of the world's best-known comedians. Working Dog Productions asked Flanagan to work on their TV comedy series Utopia in 2013 and cast her in the role of Rhonda the public relations manager, which Flanagan played for five seasons.

Flanagan resigned from The Project in August 2014 but stayed for four months to finish the year. Charlie Pickering approached her to join his new TV show, The Weekly with Charlie Pickering, where she created the segments "Spectacular Failures of the 21st Century" and "Problem Solver". As the series progressed, Flanagan created two other segments, "Bandwagon Rider" and "Human Barometer".

For two weeks during the end of 2014 and early 2015, Flanagan was a stand-in for Annabel Crabb's weekly newspaper column for Fairfax Media.

In February 2015, Flanagan was the third ambassador for the Adelaide Fringe, succeeding singer Katie Noonan and inaugural Adelaide Fringe ambassador and comedian Paul McDermott. She toured Australia with her third stand-up comedy show, Seriously?, in 2015, with her entourage of two.

In 2015, Flanagan made an appearance on Network 10's comedy quiz show Have You Been Paying Attention, and continues to appear on the show multiple times annually.

Flanagan is an advocate of writing and writers in the screen industry. She sponsored the Best Narrative Award at the 2015 Heart of Gold International Short Film Festival in Gympie and was one of the judges for the film scripts in that category.

In 2017, Flanagan and her sister Penny contributed as writers for the TV series Drop Dead Weird. Flanagan began an Australian national tour of her fourth standup show, Smashing, the same year.

In March 2018, Flanagan released a book of personal and professional autobiographical stories called Bridge Burning and Other Hobbies.

Flanagan announced her departure from The Weekly With Charlie Pickering during the final episode of season four (2018), but returned for The Yearly with Charlie Pickering special in December 2018.

In August 2018, Flanagan presented a sketch on her "pretend" book called 488 Rules for Life: An Antidote to Idiots, as a joke inspired by Jordan Peterson's book 12 Rules for Life, on The Weekly with Charlie Pickering. This idea inspired a published book in 2019 called 488 Rules for Life: The Thankless Art of Being Correct.

=== 2021–present: Fisk ===
In March 2021, Flanagan's sitcom Fisk, which she co-created, co-wrote, co-directed and starred in, aired on ABC TV. Fisk was nominated for and won two 2021 AACTA Awards, including Best Narrative Comedy Series and Best Comedy Performer for Flanagan. Flanagan was nominated for and won the Silver Logie for Most Popular actress at the 2022 Logie Awards for her work on Fisk. The series returned for a second season in October 2022. Flanagan again won the Silver Logie at the 2023 Logie Awards for her work in the second season of Fisk.

In 2023, Flanagan returned for the fifth season of Utopia, which aired on the ABC in June and July 2023. For this role she again won the Silver Logie at the 2024 Logie awards, with the category being changed to Best Lead actress in a Comedy. Also in 2023, she appeared on the comedy improvisation program Thank God You're Here.

In late 2023, a third season of Fisk was commissioned by the ABC, and it premiered in October 2024. Flanagan again won the Silver Logie for Best Lead Actress in a Comedy at the 2025 Logie Awards for her work in the third season of Fisk. The program took home a total of five awards, including Best Scripted Comedy Program, making it the most successful show of the ceremony.

On 22 September 2025, it was announced that Flanagan would reunite with comedian Anne Edmonds for ABC series Bad Company.

== Corporate work and literary events ==
Flanagan tailors her comedy material to suit corporate events, galas, award nights and launches. She has written and presented videos for clients such as Nokia and Subaru. An accomplished master of ceremonies, Flanagan hosted many awards nights and provided after-dinner comedy for companies as diverse as Australia Post and the Australian Pharmaceutical Association. In 2015, Flanagan was master of ceremonies at Art of Music Live, a music concert held every two years where a group of Australia's top visual artists come together to create an original exhibition and each artist chooses an iconic Australian/New Zealand song to inspire an artwork. The work is then auctioned at a gala dinner in the Art Gallery of New South Wales with all proceeds from Art of Music Live going to Nordoff-Robbins Music Therapy, who transform lives through music.

In 2012, Flanagan joined a panel of writers, musicians and artists for the literary event called Women of Letters, an interactive talk that examines the lost art of letter writing and also celebrates women in writing. Funds raised go to a Victorian not-for-profit charity animal rescue centre called Edgar's Mission Farm Sanctuary. In 2013, Flanagan was invited to be part of Adelaide's new literary festival called Word Adelaide, where she participated in two events during the four-day program. Flanagan hosted Yarn Spinning, the opening event of Word Adelaide that celebrates two long-established Australian traditions: telling tall stories and going to the pub. She also featured in the event In Their Own Words, sharing the stage with Matt Lucas of Little Britain fame, Roly Sussex and musician Guy Pratt who performed in the bands Pink Floyd and Icehouse, to explore how the language of comedy has changed our lives and culture.

== Hosting ==
Flanagan hosted and performed stand-up at the Melbourne International Comedy Festival Gala in 2010. Flanagan hosted and performed stand-up comedy at the Opening Night Comedy Allstars Supershow to launch the Melbourne International Comedy Festival in March 2017, which then screened on the ABC and ABC iview in April 2017. In 2017, Flanagan co-hosted New Year's Eve: The Early Night Show with Hoot the Owl, which screened on the ABC and ABC iview in December as part of the public broadcaster's New Year's Eve programming.

== Community and charity work ==
In 2003 while Flanagan was living and working in the UK, she joined some of the UK's top comedians for a charity fundraiser hosted by comedian Steve Coogan. Flanagan appeared alongside Ross Noble, Johnny Vegas, Simon Pegg, Tim Vine, Lee Mack, Matt Lucas, Rob Brydon, and Mark Williams in Coogan's Drugathon 2 to raise funds for the Chemical Dependency Centre (now named Action on Addiction) and RAPt (The Rehabilitation of Prisoners Trust).

In 2009, Flanagan performed in Sydney at the Jerry Lewis Laugh For Life charity concert to support Muscular Dystrophy Foundation Australia (MDFA) in their fund raising and awareness efforts to fight the muscle wasting disease. Flanagan appeared alongside Australian comedians Julia Morris, Paul McDermott, Mikey Robins, Peter Berner, Fiona O'Loughlin and Tom Gleeson in the fundraising gig at Sydney's Enmore Theatre.

Flanagan has donated performances at charity and fundraising events such as Comedians Unite for the Premier's Disaster Relief Appeal to help victims of Queensland's 2011 floods, and donated half of the profits from her 2013 Bundaberg show to the Queensland Red Cross Flood Appeal.

In 2013, Flanagan and her dog Henry became ambassadors for the Delta Society, which involves taking trained therapy dogs to visit hospitals, care facilities and schools across Australia. As ambassador, Flanagan helped the society to spread the word and promote the society's charitable programs, including Delta Therapy Dogs, Classroom Canines and Delta Dog Safe. She is particularly fond of Delta's Classroom Canines program, which uses the principles of dog therapy to assist children with reading difficulties and helps children to be excited about reading and writing.

== Personal life ==
Flanagan's father, John Flanagan, was an Australian author, best known for the Ranger's Apprentice and Brotherband novel series. Her sister, Penny, is a musician and one-half of 1990s indie band Club Hoy; she often appears in Flanagan's shows. Her brother, Michael, is a chef and "runs a little coffee hut at the snowfields in Japan".

In 2015, Flanagan was living in Melbourne, with a Burmese cat and a dog.

== Awards and nominations ==
=== Comedy release ===
Year	Nominee / work	Award	Result	Ref.
2017	Seriously?	Best Comedy Release	Nominated	

=== Film ===
Year	Award	Category	Work	Result	Role	Ref.
2005	New York City Short Film Festival Award	Best Comedy Short	Dating Ray Fenwick	Won	Writer, director	
2005	New York City Short Film Festival Award	Audience Choice	Dating Ray Fenwick	Won	Writer, director	

=== Television ===
Year	Award	Category	Work	Result	Role	Ref.
2016	6th Annual Equity Ensemble Awards	Outstanding Performance by an Ensemble in a Comedy Series	Utopia Season 2 (2015)	Won	Shared with Rob Sitch, Anthony Lehmann, Celia Pacquola, Dave Lawson, Emma-Louise Wilson, Luke McGregor, Michelle Lim Davidson, Toby Truslove.	
2021	2021 Festival Series Mania	Best Series in the International Comedy Competition	Fisk	Won	Writer, director, actor	
2021	The 54th Annual AWGIE Awards	Television Comedy- Situation or Narrative	Fisk: Season 1, episode 1 'Portrait of a Lady'	Nominated	Co-writer: Penny Flanagan with Kitty Flanagan	
2021	11th Annual AACTA Awards	Best Comedy Performer	Fisk	Won	Kitty Flanagan as Helen Tudor-Fisk	
2021	11th Annual AACTA Awards	Best Narrative Comedy Series	Fisk	Won	Vincent Sheehan, Porchlight Films/ABC	
2022	Screen Producers Australia Awards	Comedy Program or Series Production of the Year	Fisk	Won	Vincent Sheehan, Porchlight Films Pty Ltd/ABC	
2022	Logie Awards	TV Week Silver Logie for Most Popular Actress	Fisk	Won	Kitty Flanagan as Helen Tudor-Fisk	
2022	Logie Awards	Most Popular Comedy Program	Fisk	Nominated		
2023	Logie Awards	Most Popular Comedy Program	Fisk	Nominated		
2023	Logie Awards	Most Outstanding Comedy Program	Fisk	Nominated		
2023	Logie Awards	Silver Logie for Most Popular Actress	Fisk	Won	Kitty Flanagan as Helen Tudor-Fisk	
2024	Logie Awards	Silver Logie for Best Lead Actress in a Comedy	Utopia	Won	Kitty Flanagan as Rhonda Stewart	
2025	Logie Awards	Silver Logie for Best Lead Actress in a Comedy	Fisk	Won	Kitty Flanagan as Helen Tudor-Fisk	
2025	Logie Awards	Best Scripted Comedy Program	Fisk	Won		

=== Stand-up comedy ===
Year	Award	Category	Work	Result	Role	Ref.
2010	Helpmann Awards	Best Comedy Performer	Charming and Alarming	Nominated	Writer, performer	
2013	Adelaide Fringe	Best Comedy	Hello Kitty Flanagan	Won	Writer, performer	
2013	Helpmann Awards	Best Comedy Performer	Hello Kitty Flanagan	Nominated	Writer, performer	
2013	Melbourne International Comedy Festival	Barry Award for Best Show	Hello Kitty Flanagan	Nominated	Writer, performer	

== Stand-up comedy tours ==
Tours
Year	Title	Notes	Role
2000	Flanosserus	Debut solo stand-up show at the Melbourne International Comedy Festival	Writer/performer
2002	Kitty Flanagan	Cat Laughs Comedy Festival, Ireland	Writer/performer
2003	Kitty Flanagan: Thick	Debut stand-up comedy show at the Edinburgh Fringe Festival	Writer/performer
2004	The Sketch Show cast	HBO Comedy Festival in Aspen, Colorado, USA	Writer/performer
2005	Kitty Flanagan	New Zealand International Comedy Festival	Writer/performer
2006	Kitty Flanagan	Montreal Just For Laughs Comedy Festival	Writer/performer
2006–2007	Kitty Flanagan: A Festival of Me	with Penny Flanagan in Australia and at the Edinburgh Fringe Festival	Writer/performer/singer
2007	Kitty Flanagan	Cologne Comedy Festival, Germany	Writer/performer
2008	Kitty Flanagan	Cape Town Comedy Festival, South Africa	Writer/performer
2008	Comedy Convoy	Kitty Flanagan with Dai Henwood, Jason John Whitehead, Jason Cook and Simon McKinney at the New Zealand International Comedy Festival	Writer/performer
2008	Kitty Flanagan	Birmingham Comedy Festival, UK	Writer/performer
2009	Kitty Flanagan	Melbourne International Comedy Festival Roadshow in Australia	Writer/performer
2009	Kitty Flanagan	Jozi International Comedy Festival, South Africa	Writer/performer
2010–2011	Charming and Alarming	with Penny Flanagan in their debut at the Adelaide Fringe, Melbourne International Comedy Festival, Brisbane Comedy Festival, Perth's Wild West Comedy Festival & regional Australian tour	Writer/performer/singer
2012	Kitty Flanagan's Two Thumbs Down and a Raspberry	Workshop tour with Penny Flanagan in Australia	Writer/performer/singer
2012–2013	Hello Kitty Flanagan	with Penny Flanagan at the Adelaide Fringe, Melbourne International Comedy Festival and regional centres in Australia	Writer/performer/singer
2013	Hello Kitty Flanagan	Montreal Just For Laughs Comedy Festival in Canada	Writer/performer
2014	Kitty Flanagan and the Whiteboard	workshop tour with Penny Flanagan in Australia	Writer/performer/singer
2014–2016	Seriously?	with Penny Flanagan at the Adelaide Fringe, Melbourne International Comedy Festival, Canberra Comedy Festival and regional centres in Australia	Writer/performer/singer
2016–2017	All New Whitey McWhiteboard Tryout Show	Workshop tour in Canberra and Sydney & regional Australian tour	Writer/performer
2017	Smashing – A Sneaky Preview	Preview show tour in Victoria	Writer/performer
2017–2019	Smashing	with Penny Flanagan at the Adelaide Fringe, Melbourne International Comedy Festival, capital cities and regional centres in Australia	Writer/performer/singer

== Filmography ==
=== Film ===
Year	Title	Role	Notes
2003	You Can't Stop The Murders	Berryl	Actor
2005	Dating Ray Fenwick	Shirley	Writer/director/actor
2009	I Can't Believe It's Not Better	Kate Hanagan	Actor
2011	Reservoir Cats	Kitty DJ	Voice actor

=== Television ===
Year	Title	Role	Notes
1995–1996	Full Frontal	Writer/actor	41 episodes
1996	Shaun Micallef's World Around Him	Actor	1 episode
1998	The Micallef Program	Writer/actor	3 episodes
1999	The 50 Foot Show	Writer/actor	6 episodes
2000–2001	The Fat	Herself	3 episodes
2003–2004	The Sketch Show	Writer/actor	8 episodes
2005	Rove Live	Herself	1 episode
2005–2011	Spicks and Specks	Herself	4 episodes
2006–2008	Touch Me, I'm Karen Taylor	Writer	14 episodes
2007	The Sideshow	Herself	2 episodes
2008–2012	Good News Week	Herself	18 episodes
2009–2014	The Project	Herself	85 episodes
2009	The Jesters	Radio Host (voice)	2 episodes
2010	Melbourne International Comedy Festival Gala	Herself (host and performer)	1 episode
2011	The Comedy Festivals Preview Show	Herself	1 episode
2012	The Unbelievable Truth	Herself	3 episodes
2013	The Australia Day Showdown: Can You Be Too Australian?	Herself	1 episode
2013	Adam Hills in Gordon Street Tonight	Herself	1 episode
2013	This Week Live	Herself	1 episode
2013	Wil Does Montreal: Just For Laughs	Herself	1 episode
2014-2023	Utopia	Rhonda Stewart	32 episodes*
2014–2016	The Book Club	Herself	2 episodes
2015–2018	The Weekly with Charlie Pickering	Writer/Herself	58 episodes
2015–2018	The Yearly with Charlie Pickering	Writer/Herself	4 episodes
2015–present	Have You Been Paying Attention?	Herself	80 episodes
2016	58th Annual Logie Awards	Presenter/Herself	1 episode
2017	Opening Night Comedy Allstars Supershow	Host/Herself	1 episode
2017	Whovians (episode 2 – Smile): 13th Doctor Who Auditions	Herself	1 episode
2017	Drop Dead Weird	Writer	2 episodes
2017	True Story with Hamish & Andy (episode 5 – "Jack's Story")	Concert Master	1 episode
2017	New Year's Eve: The Early Night Show	Herself/Presenter	1 episode
2018	The Living Room (episode 22 - interview with Amanda Keller)	Herself/Guest	1 episode
2019	Better Homes and Gardens (episode 8 – cooking with Karen Martini)	Herself/Guest	1 episode
2019	Australia Talks	Herself/Guest	1 episode
2021	Kangaroo Beach	Sandy (voice)	
2021–2024	Fisk	Helen Tudor-Fisk	18 episodes
2023	Thank God You're Here	Herself	1 episode
2025	Sam Pang Tonight	Herself/Guest/Guest announcer	1 episode
2026	Bad Company	Julia McNamara	Main cast

*Episodes as of season 4. Flanagan reprised her role for season 5 of Utopia in 2023.

== Web series ==
Web Series
Year	Title	Role	Notes
2016	Rusty Fragment – The Acupuncturist	Actor	1 episode

== DVD releases ==
DVD Recordings
Year	Title	Extras/Special Features	Notes
2009 (production year) 2011 (release year)	Charming and Alarming	The 7PM Project (now The Project): Kitty Flanagan's segments on 'Pet Résumés', 'Portion Distortion', 'Sickies Spike', 'Online Haggling', 'Quiet Carriages'; The Great Debate: The Olympics Are Fools' Gold; 1996 Full Frontal sketches; Good News Week segment: The Couch; Headliners; The Sideshow with Paul McDermott: Kitty and Penny Flanagan sing 'Show The World'; Kitty Flanagan's short film: 'Dating Ray Fenwick'	Region 4; Language: English; Running time: 60 minutes
2014 (production and release year)	Hello Kitty Flanagan	The Project: Kitty Flanagan's segments on 'Social Media', 'Wedding Gift Registries', 'Climbing Trees', 'Dangerous Vegetables', 'Lady Stress', 'Mothers' Questions'; The Unbelievable Truth; Kitty's Home Movie: Teach Your Dog Tricks; Hello Kitty Flanagan Promotional Video; Sandgropers' Special: Bonus for Perth people	Region 4; Language: English; Running time: 70 minutes; Hello Kitty Flanagan is available on Netflix for online streaming in the following countries: Australia, Belgium, Canada, Denmark, Finland, Ireland, Luxembourg, Mexico, Netherlands, New Zealand, Norway, Panama, Sweden, UK, USA
2016 (production year) 2017 (release year)	Seriously?	Have You Been Paying Attention?: The Moth; The Weekly with Charlie Pickering: Kitty Flanagan's Spectacular Failures of the 21st Century – Coffee; The Yearly with Charlie Pickering: Kitty Flanagan's Spectacular Failures of 2015 – Dishwasher Cooking; The Weekly with Charlie Pickering: Kitty Flanagan's Problem Solver – Flushable Wipes; The Weekly with Charlie Pickering: Kitty Flanagan's Spectacular Failures of the 21st Century – Humans; The Yearly with Charlie Pickering: Kitty Flanagan's Bandwagon Rider – Pokémon; The Weekly with Charlie Pickering: Kitty Flanagan's Problem Solver – Sex; The Weekly with Charlie Pickering: Kitty Flanagan's Bandwagon Rider – Vaping	Region 4; Language: English; Running time: 101 minutes (includes 29 minutes of extras)
2016 (production year) 2017 (release year)	Kitty Flanagan: The Live Collection – DVD Boxset	Kitty Flanagan: Charming and Alarming; Kitty Flanagan: Hello Kitty Flanagan; Kitty Flanagan: Seriously?	Region 4; Language: English; Running time:

== Discography ==
=== Singles ===
- 2014: Middle Age Lady

== Books ==
- 2018: Bridge Burning and Other Hobbies by Kitty Flanagan (ISBN 978-1-76063-205-2)
- 2019: 488 Rules for Life: The Thankless Art of Being Correct by Kitty Flanagan (ISBN 978-1-76087-530-5)
- 2021: More Rules for Life: A Special Volume for Enthusiasts by Kitty Flanagan (ISBN 978-1-76106-661-0)

== Published contributions ==
- 2014: 'Sharing the things we don't like makes a good date' (Fairfax Media)
- 2015: 'Being child-free is no reason to keep mum' (Fairfax Media)
- 2015: 'Is so much noise really necessary?' (Fairfax Media)
- 2015: 'Here's the tip: US customs is a grey area' (Fairfax Media)
- 2016: 'Ankle-biters are a total walk in the park' (Fairfax Media)
- 2016: 'The stupid appliances we waste money on' (Fairfax Media)
- 2016: 'Modern houses don't need so many bathrooms' (Fairfax Media)
- 2016: 'Assimilation won't happen overnight but it will happen, just like Pantene' (Fairfax Media)
- 2016: 'Here's a fact: an opinion is not the same as a fact' (Fairfax Media)
- 2017: 'When I look at Donald Trump, I see a bit of myself' (Fairfax Media)
- 2017: 'Teenagers know absolutely everything, except...' (Fairfax Media)
- 2017: 'Donald Trump has taught me anyone can be a dictator' (Fairfax Media)
- 2018: 'Avoid the lazy cliches and dig deep for conversation starters with children at Christmas' (Fairfax Media)
- 2018: 'What's not to love about pavlova? Plenty actually' (Fairfax Media)
- 2018: 'Let's wrap up this grabby gift registry caper' (Fairfax Media)
- 2018: 'Kitty Flanagan: A ham-handed separation.' Extract from Kitty Flanagan's Bridge Burning and Other Hobbies, published by Allen and Unwin (Fairfax Media)
