= Bestseller =

Top-selling or frequently-borrowed book

A bestseller is a book or other media noted for its top selling status, with bestseller lists published by newspapers, magazines, and book store chains. Some lists are broken down into classifications and specialties (novel, nonfiction book, cookbook, etc.). An author may also be referred to as a bestseller if their work often appears in a list. Well-known bestseller lists in the U.S. are published by Publishers Weekly, USA Today, The New York Times, and IndieBound. The New York Times tracks book sales from national and independent bookstores, as well as sales from major internet retailers such as Amazon.com and Barnes & Noble.

In everyday use, the term bestseller is not usually associated with a specified level of sales, and may be used very loosely in publishers' publicity. Books of superior academic value tend not to be bestsellers, although there are exceptions. Lists simply give the highest-selling titles in the category over the stated period. Some books have sold many more copies than current "bestsellers", but over a long period of time.

Blockbusters for films and chart-toppers in recorded music are similar terms, although, in film and music, these measures generally are related to industry sales figures for attendance, requests, broadcast plays, or units sold.

Particularly in the case of novels, a large budget and a chain of literary agents, editors, publishers, reviewers, retailers, librarians, and marketing efforts are involved in "making" bestsellers, that is, trying to increase sales.

Steinberg defined a bestseller as a book for which demand, within a short time of that book's initial publication, vastly exceeds what is then considered to be big sales.

== Early best sellers ==
The term "best seller" is first known to have been recorded in print in 1889 in the Kansas City, Missouri newspaper The Kansas Times & Star, but the phenomenon of immediate popularity goes back to the early days of mass production of printed books. For earlier books, when the maximum number of copies that would be printed was relatively small, a count of editions is the best way to assess sales. Since effective copyright was slow to take hold, many editions were pirated well into the period of the Enlightenment, and without effective royalty systems in place, authors often saw little, if any, of the revenues for their popular works.

The earliest highly popular books were nearly all religious, but the Bible, as a large book, remained expensive until the nineteenth century. This tended to keep the numbers printed and sold low. Unlike today, it was important for a book to be short to be a bestseller, or it would be too expensive to reach a large audience. Very short works such as Ars moriendi, the Biblia pauperum, and versions of the Apocalypse were published as cheap block-books in large numbers of different editions in several languages in the fifteenth century. These were probably affordable items for most of the minority of literate members of the population. In 16th and 17th century England Pilgrim's Progress (1678) and abridged versions of Foxe's Book of Martyrs were the most broadly read books. Robinson Crusoe (1719) and The Adventures of Roderick Random (1748) were early eighteenth century short novels with very large publication numbers, as well as gaining international success.

Tristram Shandy, a novel by Laurence Sterne, became a "cult" object in England and throughout Europe, with important cultural consequences among those who could afford to purchase books during the era of its publication. The same could be said of the works of Voltaire, particularly his comedic and philosophically satirical novel, Candide, which, according to recent research, sold more than 20,000 copies in its first month alone in 1759. Likewise, fellow French Enlightenment author Rousseau, especially his Julie, ou la nouvelle Héloïse (1761) and of Johann Wolfgang von Goethe's novel, Die Leiden des jungen Werthers (The Sorrows of Young Werther) (1774). As with some modern bestsellers, Werther spawned what today would be called a spin-off industry with items such as Werther eau de cologne and porcelain puppets depicting the main characters, being sold in large numbers.

By the time of Byron and Sir Walter Scott, effective copyright laws existed, at least in England, and many authors depended heavily on their income from their large royalties. America remained a zone of piracy until the mid-nineteenth century, a fact of which Charles Dickens and Mark Twain bitterly complained. By the middle of the 19th century, a situation akin to modern publication had emerged, where most bestsellers were written for a popular taste and are now almost entirely forgotten, with odd exceptions such as East Lynne (remembered only for the line "Gone, gone, and never called me mother!"), the wildly popular Uncle Tom's Cabin, and Sherlock Holmes.

== Description and types of bestseller ==
Bestsellers are usually separated into fiction and non-fiction categories. Different list compilers have created a number of other subcategories. The New York Times was reported to have started its "Children's Books" section in 2001 just to move the Harry Potter books out of the No. 1, 2, and 3 positions on their fiction chart, which the then three-book series had monopolized for over a year.

Bestsellers also may be ranked separately for hardcover and paperback editions. Typically, a hardcover edition appears first, followed in months or years by the much less expensive paperback version. Hardcover bestseller status may hasten the paperback release of the same, or slow the release, if hardcover sales are brisk enough. Some lists even have a third category, trade paperback bestsellers.

In the United Kingdom, a hardcover book could be considered a "bestseller" with sales ranging from 4,000 to 25,000 copies per week, and in Canada, bestsellers are determined according to weekly rankings in the country's national print sales tracking service, BNC SalesData. There are many "bestseller lists" that display anywhere from 10 to 150 titles.

=== Differences among lists ===
Bestseller lists may vary widely, depending on the method used for calculating sales. The Indie bestseller lists, for example, use only sales numbers, provided by independently owned (non-chain) bookstores, while The New York Times list includes both wholesale and retail sales from a variety of sources. A book that sells well in gift shops and grocery stores may hit a New York Times list without ever appearing on an Indie list. The USA Today list does not separate hardcover and paperback books, so that relative sales of these categories cannot be ascertained from it.

Lists from Amazon.com, the dominant online book retailer, are based only on sales from their own Web site, and are updated on an hourly basis. Wholesale sales figures are not factored into Amazon's calculations. Numerous Web sites offer advice for authors about a temporary method to boost their book higher on Amazon's list using carefully timed buying campaigns that take advantage of the frequent adjustments to rankings. For example, faith healing author Zhi Gang Sha has used this method to create a number of #1 bestsellers. The brief sales spike allows authors to tout that their book was an "Amazon.com top 100 seller" in marketing materials for books that actually have relatively low sales. Eventually book buyers may begin to recognize the relative differences among lists and settle upon which lists they will consult to determine their purchases.

The weight and price of a book may affect its positioning on lists. The Amazon.com list tends to favor hardcover, more expensive books, where the shipping charge is a smaller percentage of the overall purchase price or is sometimes free, and which tend to be more deeply discounted than paperbacks. Inexpensive mass market paperbacks tend to do better on The New York Times list than on Amazon's. Indie and Publishers Weekly separate mass market paperbacks onto their own list.

Category structure affects the positioning of a book in other ways. A book that might be buried on the Indie hardcover fiction list could be positioned very well on The New York Times hardcover advice list or the Publishers Weekly religion hardcover list.

=== Verifiability ===
Bestseller reports from companies such as Amazon.com, which appear to be based strictly on auditable sales to the public, may be at odds with bestseller lists compiled from more casual data, such as The New York Times lists' survey of retailers and publishers. The exact method for ranking The New York Times bestseller lists is a closely guarded secret.

This situation suggests a similar one in the area of popular music. In 1991, Billboard magazine switched its chart data from manual reports filed by stores, to automated cash register data collected by a service called SoundScan. The conversion saw a dramatic shake-up in chart content from one week to the next.

Today, many lists come from automated sources. Booksellers may use their POS (point-of-sale) systems to report automatically to Book Sense. Wholesalers such as the giant Ingram Content Group have bestseller calculations similar to Amazon's, but they are available only to subscribing retailers. Barnes & Noble and other large retail chains collect sales data from retail outlets and their Web sites to build their own bestseller lists.

Nielsen BookScan U.S. is perhaps the most aggressive attempt to produce a completely automatic and trusted set of bestseller lists. They claim to be gathering data directly from cash registers at more than 4,500 retail locations, including independent bookstores, large chains such as Barnes & Noble, Powell's Books, and Borders (formerly), and the general retailer Costco. Unlike the consumer-oriented lists, BookScan's data is extremely detailed and quite expensive. Subscriptions to BookScan cost up to $75,000 per year, but it can provide publishers and wholesalers with an accurate picture of book sales with regional and other statistical analyses.

=== The making of a bestseller ===
There is only one recipe for a best seller and it is a very simple one. You have to get the reader to turn over the page. If you look back on the best sellers you have read, you will find that they all have this quality. You simply have to turn over the page.

— Ian Fleming, 1963

Ultimately, having a great number of buyers creates a bestseller; however, there is a distinct "making of" process that determines which books have the potential to achieve that status. Not all publishers rely on, nor strive for, bestsellers, as the survival of small presses indicates. Large publishing houses, on the other hand, are like major record labels and film studios, and require consistent high returns to maintain their large overhead. Thus, the stakes are high. It is estimated that 200,000 new books are published each year in the U.S., and less than 1% achieve bestseller status. Along the way, major players act as gatekeepers and enablers, including literary agents, editors, publishing houses, booksellers, and the media (particularly, publishers of book reviews and bestseller lists). While literature awards have a beneficial effect at least on sales of hard covers, their impact is not detectable beyond a benchmark of ca. 800,000 sold copies. The high visibility of an established and best-selling author is paramount in the equation also. In addition to writing the book, an author has to acquire representation and negotiate this publishing chain.

At least one scientific approach to creating bestsellers has been devised. In 2004, Didier Sornette, a professor of geophysics and a complex systems theorist at UCLA, using Amazon.com sales data, created a mathematical model for predicting bestseller potential based on very early sales results. This information could be used to identify a potential for bestseller status and recommend fine tuned advertising and publicity efforts accordingly. In 1995, the authors of a book called The Discipline of Market Leaders colluded to manipulate their book onto the best seller charts. The authors allegedly purchased over 10,000 copies of their own book in small and strategically placed orders at bookstores whose sales are reported to Bookscan. Because of the ancillary benefits of making The New York Times Best Seller list (speaking engagements, more book deals, and consulting), the authors felt that buying their own work was an investment that would pay for itself. The book climbed to #8 on the list where it sat for 15 weeks, also peaking at #1 on the BusinessWeek best seller list. Since such lists hold the power of cumulative advantage, chart success often begets more chart success. And although such efforts are not illegal, they are considered highly unethical by publishers.

From what is described above, intrinsic properties of books (like style or content) are often ignored or even deemed as irrelevant for their success by consumer psychologists, literary scholars, economists and sociologists alike. The success of novels is instead said to be made by extrinsic factors like literary critics, publishers, media, conformity and other social influences. However, an elaborated model examining over a dozen external variables potentially influencing books sales could only explain less than 40% of differences in sales. Research found intrinsic properties of novels which do influence their success. For example, a smaller disparity between the frequency of emotional words and rational words was predictive for successful novels.

=== Unread bestsellers ===
Bestsellers have gained such great popularity that it has sometimes become fashionable to purchase them. Critics have pointed out that just because a book is purchased doesn't mean it will be read. The rising length of bestsellers may mean that more of them are simply becoming bookshelf decor. In 1985 members of the staff of The New Republic placed coupons redeemable for $5 cash inside 70 books that were selling well, and none of them were sent in.

== Cultural role ==
While the basic dictionary definition of bestseller is self-evident, "a popular, top-selling book", the practical cultural definition is somewhat more complex. As consumer bestseller lists generally do not detail specific criteria, such as numbers sold, sales period, sales region, and so forth, a book becomes a bestseller mainly because an "authoritative" source says it is. Calling a book a "top-selling" title is not so impressive as calling it "The New York Times bestseller". Although the former phrase is assumed to be derived from sales figures, the latter benefits from the high profile of the particular list. A book that is identified as a "bestseller" greatly improves its chance of selling to a much wider audience. In this way, bestseller has taken on its own popular meaning, rather independent of empirical data, by becoming a compromised product category and, in effect, attempting to create a marketing image. For example, a "summer bestseller" is usually determined long before the summer is over, and signals a book's suitability for millions of lounging pool-side readers.

The use of the marketing phrase, underground bestseller further illustrates the independent-from-sales, self-defining aspect of the term. For example, publisher HarperCollins suggested the bestseller potential of Divine Secrets of the Ya-Ya Sisterhood: A Novel by announcing "...four years after her award-winning, underground bestseller, Little Altars Everywhere..." in the promotion. The book went on to achieve bestseller status in the 1990s. In reviews of the 2002 film of the same name, the novel's bestseller status was cited routinely, as in "compelling adaptation of Rebecca Wells' bestseller".

The famous Diogenes Publisher in Zürich (Switzerland) started to talk about its own Worstsellers in 2006, and therewith brought a new mode-word into the German speaking European countries.

== Connection with the movie industry ==
There is a Hollywood practice of turning bestsellers into feature films. Modern movie "classics" such as Harry Potter and the Order of the Phoenix (2003), Jaws (1974), The Exorcist (1971), Love Story (1970), The Godfather (1969) began as bestsellers.

== See also ==
- List of best-selling automobiles
- List of best-selling books
- List of best-selling video games
- List of best-selling music artists
- List of best-selling singles
- List of best-selling albums
- List of highest-grossing films
- List of best-selling manga
- List of highest-grossing animated films
