= Bad Company (TV series) =

2026 Australian comedy TV series

- Genre: Comedy
- Created by: Anne Edmonds
- Written by: Anne Edmonds
- Directed by: Tom Peterson
- Starring: Anne Edmonds; Kitty Flanagan; Will Gibb; Cameron James; Ben Pfeiffer
- Country of origin: Australia
- Original language: English
- No. of episodes: 6

Production
- Producer: Andrew Walker
- Production company: Guesswork Television

Original release
- Network: ABC
- Release: 26 April – 31 May 2026

Bad Company is an Australian comedy series for the Australian Broadcasting Corporation (ABC) that released on 26 April 2026. Produced by Guesswork Television, the series focuses on Margie Argyle and the Argyle Theatre, her unchecked spending has sent in Julia McNamara who is tasked with saving a theatre company teetering on the edge of closure.

== Plot ==
Margie Argyle is an eccentric and volatile artistic director of the Argyle Theatre known for her unchecked spending and bigger than life productions. She catches the eye of Julia McNamara, who is given the task to save the theatre from closure.

== Cast ==
On 23 September 2025, Anne Edmonds and Kitty Flanagan were named in the lead roles of Bad Company.

- Anne Edmonds as Margie Argyle
- Kitty Flanagan as Julia McNamara
- Will Gibb as Ryan
- Cameron James as Christian
- Ben Pfeffer as Jacob
- Angella Dravid as Donna
- Kira Puru as Kat
- Louise Siversen as Carmel
- Sibylla Budd as Caitlen Allard

== Production ==
On 22 September the series alongside The Killings at Parrish Station was one of 46 projects to receive funding from Screen Australia.

The series was commissioned by the ABC, funded through Screen Australia and VicScreen.

On 20 November 2025 during the ABC upfronts Bad Company was announced for ABC's 2026 lineup of shows that included Dustfall and Sam Pang comedy Ground Up.

== Episodes ==
No.	Title	Original release date	Viewers
1	"Copious Totes"	26 April 2026	540,000
2	"Scrambled"	3 May 2026	488,000
3	"Chookas!"	10 May 2026	389,000
4	"Going Method"	17 May 2026	319,000
5	"Nepo Babies"	24 May 2026	318,000
6	"Le Paysan"	31 May 2026	301,000

== Release and reception ==
ABC announced the series would air from 26 April 2026.

Anthony Morris of ScreenHub rated the series four out of five stars, calling the show a "massive leap forward" after the success of Fisk, and said that it was more of a two-hander then an ensemble and to grab the series with two hands.

Louise Rugendyke of The Sydney Morning Herald rated the series four stars out of five, saying that the series "won't be for everyone – but that’s what makes it so good".
