= Beyond Order =

2021 self-help book by Jordan Peterson

Beyond Order: 12 More Rules for Life
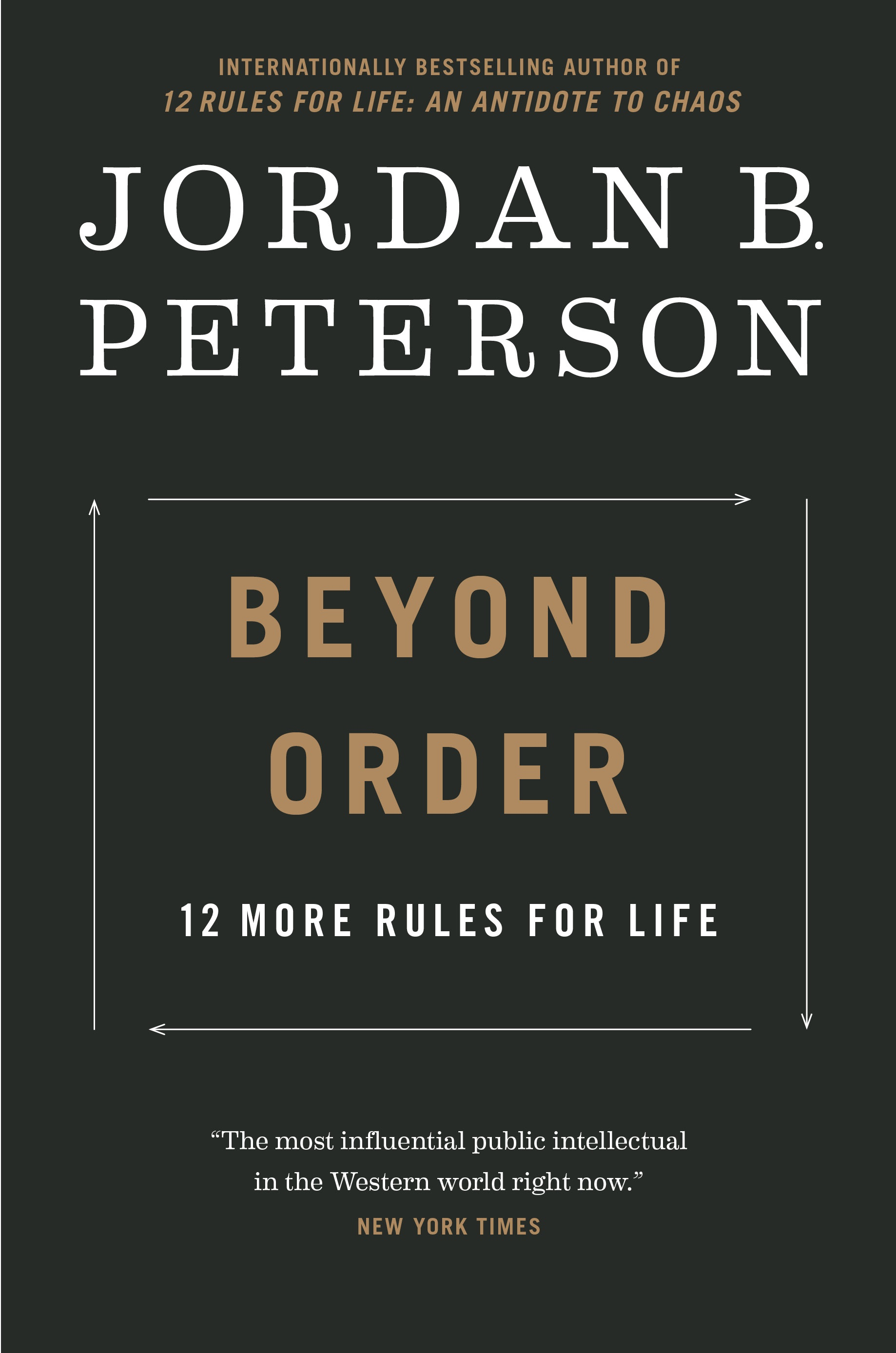
- First edition cover
- Author: Jordan Peterson
- Audio read by: Jordan Peterson
- Illustrator: Juliette Fogra
- Language: English
- Subject: Self-help; psychology; philosophy
- Publisher: Random House Canada; Penguin Allen Lane (UK)
- Publication date: March 2, 2021
- Publication place: Canada
- Media type: Print, digital, audible
- Pages: 432
- ISBN: 9780735278332 (hardcover)
- OCLC: 1223036459
- Dewey Decimal: 170/.44
- LC Class: BJ1589 .P446 2021
- Preceded by: 12 Rules for Life

Beyond Order: 12 More Rules for Life is a 2021 self-help book by Canadian clinical psychologist, YouTube personality, and psychology professor Jordan Peterson, as a sequel to his 2018 book 12 Rules for Life.

== Overview ==
=== Background ===
Peterson's original interest in writing his third book, 12 Rules for Life, grew out of a personal hobby of answering questions posted on Quora; one such question being, "What are the most valuable things everyone should know?", to which his answer comprised 42 rules.

Essentially psychological in their intention, the rules in both books are told using particular episodes of Peterson's clinical experience. Moreover, Peterson has stated that these rules were "explicitly formulated to aid in the development of the individual," though they may also prove useful at "levels of social organisation that incorporate the individual."

Peterson states that both books are predicated on the notion that chaos and order are "the two fundamental elements of reality", and that "people find meaning in optimally balancing them". The difference between the two books, according to Peterson, is that the first focuses "more on the dangers of an excess of chaos", while the second is more concerned "with the dangers of too much structure". Peterson says that 12 Rules "argues for the merits of a more conservative view of the world" while Beyond Order "argues for the merits of a more liberal view".

=== Rules ===
The book is divided into chapters with each title representing one of the following twelve specific rules for life as explained through an essay.

1. "Do not carelessly denigrate social institutions or creative achievement."
2. "Imagine who you could be and then aim single-mindedly at that."
3. "Do not hide unwanted things in the fog."
4. "Notice that opportunity lurks where responsibility has been abdicated."
5. "Do not do what you hate."
6. "Abandon ideology."
7. "Work as hard as you possibly can on at least one thing and see what happens."
8. "Try to make one room in your home as beautiful as possible."
9. "If old memories still upset you, write them down carefully and completely."
10. "Plan and work diligently to maintain the romance in your relationship."
11. "Do not allow yourself to become resentful, deceitful, or arrogant."
12. "Be grateful in spite of your suffering."

==== Writing ====
While Peterson was writing the book, his wife was diagnosed with terminal kidney cancer, though she recovered. Additionally, drug treatments for his depression led to a benzodiazepine dependence for which he was treated in Russian and Serbian rehab facilities with ketamine and an induced coma. During the COVID-19 pandemic in 2020, his daughter reported that he had contracted COVID-19.

=== Publication ===
In November 2020, shortly after the book's announcement, multiple staff at the Canadian division of Penguin Random House protested against the publication of the book. At least 70 anonymous messages were made to the publisher's diversity and inclusion committee, with "a couple" in favour of publishing. Beyond Order was subsequently released in March 2021.

== Reception ==
James Marriott of The Times wrote about the book: "Ideas that flit and glimmer in Peterson's videos look bloated and dead when strapped to the page." Believing Peterson to be famous for his personality rather than his "bonkers" philosophy, Marriott said that Peterson "may have mistaken his personality for a philosophical system", and said Peterson's Harry Potter analysis contained the "most entertaining absurdities" of the book.

Andrew Anthony of The Guardian wrote: "Viewed in the most favourable light, Peterson's rules are an attempt to locate people within society, to acknowledge the systems and structures that have long existed and, instead of seeking to tear them down, encourage his readers to find their most functional position within them". Anthony criticised that "The problem arises when his ragbag of common sense dictums ... are taken themselves to be a kind of gospel."

On the other hand, Larissa Nolan of Irish Independent called it "a psychology book on another plane, a self-help book de profundis, from a beautiful mind. That he wrote it during the greatest crisis of his life is a testament to the power of what he preaches."

In The Atlantic, Helen Lewis commented that Peterson's popularity is because of, not in spite of, "his contradictions and human frailties". Lewis wrote: "he is one of notably few prominent figures willing to confront the most fundamental questions of existence ... He doesn't offer get-rich-quick schemes, or pickup techniques. He is not libertine or libertarian. He promises that life is a struggle, but that it is ultimately worthwhile." In Philosophy Now, B.V.E. Hyde compared Peterson's "realism about the human condition" to the Absurdist philosophy of Albert Camus.

Suzanne Moore of The Telegraph rated the book four out of five stars, saying that Peterson is "at his best when telling stories of his clinical practice" and finding the book, like its predecessor, "hokey wisdom combined with good advice". Moore also said that there was "not much here for women at all" nor any "real analysis of how power operates", and that "the rules are really nothing to argue about".

=== Use of critics' reviews in the book ===
Beyond Order has been criticized by literary critics for the way that it portrayed their reviews on the book's back cover. On a social media post, James Marriott, who had called Peterson's philosophy "bonkers" on several occasions, shared a photo of the back cover of the book, which quoted him describing the book as "a philosophy of the meaning of life". He referred to the book's use of his words as "amusing". On another occasion, New Statesman writer Johanna Thomas-Corr described the complimentary portrayal of her review in the book as "horrifying" and a "gross misrepresentation".

Following the complaints shared by Peterson's critics, the Society of Authors (SoA) published a statement about the misrepresentation of negative reviews on book covers. In the statement, SoA chief executive Nicola Solomon called the practice "morally questionable" and said that readers and authors "deserve honest, fair marketing from publishers. We can't get that by undermining and misrepresenting one writer to boost the sales of another. It puts off reviewers from reviewing and readers from buying."
