= Club Hoy =

Australian pop rock group

- Origin: Sydney, Australia
- Genres: Pop rock
- Years active: 1989–1993
- Label: Regular Records
- Past members: Penny Flanagan and Julia Richardson, Bernie Hayes and Vincent Sheehan.

Club Hoy were an Australian Pop rock group formed in 1989. The group released one studio album, Thursday's Fortune in 1991.

== History ==
Club Hoy formed in Sydney, in 1989, consisting of Penny Flanagan and Julia Richardson. The duo released their debut single "On and On," in 1990. Late that year, additional musicians Bernie Hayes (bass) and Vincent Sheehan (drums) joined the band.

In early 1991, they released their second single, the double A-side "Da Da Da Da"/"Green and Blue". In September 1991, they released "House on Fire", as the lead single from their debut album, Thursday's Fortune. Another singles was released from Thursday's Fortune in 1992.

In 1992, two EP were released, with Trumpets being promoted with the track "You Promised, You Said". In 1992, Club Hoy provided vocals and also appeared in Grant McLennan's (formerly of Go Betweens, Jack Frost) music video for "Surround Me". In 1993, Club Hoy disbanded. Penny Flanagan went on to pursue a successful solo career, while Julia Richardson and Bernie Hayes formed a new group, the Troublemakers.

== Discography ==
=== Albums ===
Title	Album details	Peak chart positions
Title	Album details	AUS
Thursday's Fortune	Released: November 1991; Label: Regular Records (24006); Formats: CD, Cassette, LP	96

=== Extended plays ===
Title	EP details	Peak chart positions
Title	EP details	AUS
Walk Away	Released: 1992; Label: Regular Records (D11251); Formats: CD	-
Trumpets	Released: November 1992; Label: Regular Records (D11328); Formats: CD	88

=== Singles ===
Year	Title	Peak chart positions	Album
Year	Title	AUS	Album
1990	"On and On"	-	non album single
1991	"Da Da Da Da" /" Green and Blue"	-	non album single
1991	"House on Fire"	134	Thursday's Fortune
1992	"Not Like That"	106	Thursday's Fortune
