= The Sketch Show =

Television series

- Starring: Lee Mack; Tim Vine; Jim Tavaré; Karen Taylor; Ronni Ancona; Kitty Flanagan
- Country of origin: United Kingdom
- No. of series: 2
- No. of episodes: 16

Production
- Running time: 23 minutes

Original release
- Network: ITV
- Release: 10 September 2001 – 24 April 2004

Related
- Not Going Out

The Sketch Show is a British television sketch comedy programme, featuring British comedians, with the addition of Australian comedian Kitty Flanagan from series 2. It aired on ITV between 2001 and 2004. The show was first commissioned in 2001 and was co-produced by a company owned by Steve Coogan.

The show started at the Edinburgh Festival Fringe in 1999, and starred Lee Mack, Catherine Tate and Dan Antopolski. Mack later expressed regret at not including them in the TV show.

== Cast ==
The original line-up of the cast was Lee Mack, Jim Tavaré, Tim Vine, Karen Taylor and Ronni Ancona.

For the second series, Kitty Flanagan replaced Ancona, who left to concentrate on BBC One's Alistair McGowan's Big Impression (which was shortened to simply Big Impression to reflect Ancona playing as many parts as McGowan himself). Again, sketches featured performers using their own names.

With the exception of some child actors in certain sketches, there were no guest stars at any point during the programme.

== Writers ==
All of the cast contributed to the writing of the show; however, Lee Mack is credited as the lead writer. Other comedic writers/actors, such as Jimmy Carr, John Archer, Ricky Gervais, Matthew Hardy, John Mann, Stephen Colledge and Daniel Maier were also responsible for the show's humour, though were not featured in the show.

== DVD ==
A DVD of the first season was released by Visual Entertainment in Australia on 12 September 2005. It is a region-free DVD and the only extra on the disc is a short photo gallery. All 8 episodes on the single-disc release are combined into a 3-hour feature. The opening and closing credits have been removed for all episodes, and a number of sketches have been edited out to fit the series onto a single disc.

== International versions ==
An American version of the show, produced by Kelsey Grammer, aired in early 2005 on Fox. The main cast consisted of Malcolm Barrett, Kaitlin Olson, Mary Lynn Rajskub, and Paul F. Tompkins, as well as Lee Mack from the British version of the show. Grammer appeared in short opening and closing segments in each episode.

Many of the sketches from the British version were recreated, such as the California Dreamin', English Course, and Sign Language sketches.

One sketch from this version has Grammer waking up from a nightmare, which he describes as: "I dreamt that Frasier was over, and I was on this Sketch Show!" The sketch is a spoof of the Newhart series finale.

The series was filmed in London at Teddington Studios, with a British audience.

Only six episodes of the show were made, and it was cancelled after only four of them had been shown, but all six were aired with the last airing on 19 April 2005.

Its Sunday night time slot was replaced by American Dad!
