= Touch Me, I'm Karen Taylor =

- Touch Me, I'm Karen Taylor
- Created by: Karen Taylor
- Directed by: Ben Kellett
- Starring: Karen Taylor; Anna Crilly; Jalaal Hartley; Lawry Lewin; Clare Warde; Carli Norris; Katy Brand
- Country of origin: United Kingdom
- Original language: English
- No. of series: 2
- No. of episodes: 14 (including pilot)

Production
- Executive producers: Jon Thoday; Richard Allen-Turner; Richard Grocock
- Camera setup: Multiple-camera
- Running time: 30 mins
- Production company: Avalon Television

Original release
- Network: BBC Three
- Release: 28 March 2006 – 21 August 2008

Touch Me, I'm Karen Taylor is a British television sketch comedy show written and performed by comedian Karen Taylor and produced by Avalon Productions. The show focuses largely on sex and contains much innuendo. The title animation was created by Joanna Davidovich.

A German version of the series, called Ich Bin Boes, starring Mirja Boes, was produced by RTL in 2009.

== History ==
The show's pilot episode debuted on BBC Three on 11 March 2006 and a full run was soon ordered. The first series consisted of six episodes and was aired on the channel from 11 June to 16 July 2007. Lesley Ann Albiston was one of the writers.

A second series was later commissioned, consisting of seven episodes. It aired between 10 July and 21 August 2008. Karen Taylor has stated on her MySpace page that the second series did well in the ratings, and that she hopes there will be a third, however no source confirmed that would be a third.

== Main characters ==
Here follows a list of the main, most recurring characters in the series.

- Karen Taylor narrates between sketches in which she attempts to complete some feat by the end of the episode, such as taking part in a cheerleading dance-off or writing a song for charity. (Series 1 & 2)
- Unhelpful woman is on scene when an old lady has been mugged, or a friend is having marital issues, and listens to their upset, before saying: 'Well, I hear what you're saying, and it sounds to me like this...' at which point she will burst into fake tears and mock the person in a baby voice. (Series 1)
- Valerie D'Enton offers budget cosmetics advice to the "poor", giving ideas such as cutting out and taping a pair of celebrity's eyes over their own, or putting black tape on their body to make it appear thinner. The original title of this sketch was known as "Beauty on a Budget" (Series 1 & 2)
- Glamorama is a fictional current-affairs show, a parody of "Panorama", which is hosted by a well-meaning, but seemingly unintelligent, footballer's wife type. The host invites her similarly unintelligent friends to discuss significant matters, such as war or child labour, but none of them actually have any knowledge of the subject. (Series 1 & 2)
- Miss Harper is a divorced substitute teacher, who is desperate for sex and finds herself attracted to her male students. She finds various excuses to see their bodies by, for example, making them write lines in their underwear as punishment for wrongdoings, or by demonstrating, using the boys, inappropriate conduct in the workplace. The sketch is set in Taylor's hometown, Barrow-in-Furness in the fictional Gradwell Lane Secondary School. Dani Harmer and Jamie Sweeney feature as some of her students. (Series 1 & 2)
- Cash Cow is a late-night quiz show, clearly modelled on shows such as Pop The Q or The Mint. It is hosted by a stereotypically jolly late-night quiz host with a cash prize available. Usually, viewers must guess such things as an apparently well-known phrase, the name of any album since 1950, or something that exists. Viewers call in with increasingly stupid answers, until it reaches a point where the host loses her temper. (Series 1 & 2)
- Kaz and Jen are two friends wo are desperate to "shock and turn on" their lager-swigging boyfriends by pretending to be lesbians. They touch each other suggestively, while hinting that they might be practising lesbians who "Don't need a man!" (Series 1 & 2)
- The Tao of Taylor is offered when there is a problem, such as mother unable to get a pram on a bus, or a man unable to get an erection. Taylor appears, hands out her own brand of advice (such as "If you can't get it up... you're not a real man") and turns to the camera, smiling, and giving the thumbs up. (Series 1 & 2)
- MeMeMeSpace is a fictional website, clearly modelled on Myspace, to which users upload videos in which they describe themselves. Users usually have strange characteristics, such as an obsession with collecting hedgehogs, a love for drinking large amounts of wine, dressing their cat up as Hitler or a hobby that could be taken as something sexually suggestive. (Series 1 & 2)
- The Brass Lady is a party-loving backbencher who becomes Prime Minister after the entire cabinet dies. She clearly isn't cut out for the role and is the opposite of the other, po-faced people around her, which results in her doing impulsive things such as sleeping with someone who turns out to be the leader of the opposition or asking a BBC News crew member if she can get Hollyoaks on their green room television. (Series 1)
- "MAAAN!" When Taylor cannot do something, such as putting up a shelf or throwing a TV remote to her friend, she shouts "Man! Man! MAAAN!" at which point a man will appear and help her. Occasionally a woman will come along and offers help, however Taylor refuses as she needs a man, at which point the woman goes on to explain she is a lesbian, which is approved by Taylor. (Series 1 & 2)
- Joanna is a lustful young woman who has married a very old millionaire whom she seemingly doesn't love; she's only with him so that she can live off his millions while enjoying herself with attractive young hunks. (Series 1 & 2)
- Pre-Menstrual Girl is the alter-ego to ordinary office worker Penelope. When trouble arises (such as the office being held up at gunpoint or a shop being robbed) she reverses her body-clock and transforms into Pre-Menstrual Girl, a superhero who saves people's lives by winning the villains' hearts with her neurotic sobbing and sniping. (Series 1 & 2)
- Tits Tits Titty Tit Tits A woman who is paranoid that everyone she meets just wants to talk about her "tits", and proceeds to challenge them, saying that she has a brain in her head, before calling them a "shallow, evil bastard". (Series 1 & 2)
- Woman in Nightclub A man and woman are getting to know each other in a nightclub. The woman will try to explain something, for example that she and her sister fell out because she picked up her bag of peas while out shopping, and the man won't hear, so she'll shout back, making an accidental double entendre just as the music goes down, e.g. "I picked up her-peas!" (Series 1 & 2)
- The Naive Woman and her friend are always seen watching the television and impressed with what they saw, then she will make a comment or a question that shows her misunderstanding. For example, after watching The Bill, she asks "who's Bill?" and after watching The Graduate, she assumes that "Mrs. Robinson" is Anne Robinson when she asks "Did she do that before The Weakest Link". (Series 1 & 2)
