= Penny Flanagan =

Australian singer and author

- Origin: Sydney, Australia
- Genres: Adult contemporary, folk, pop rock
- Occupations: Singer-songwriter, musician, author
- Years active: 1989–present

Penny Flanagan is an Australian singer-songwriter and author.

== Career ==
=== Music ===
Penny Flanagan's musical career began in 1989 as one half of the folk-pop duo Club Hoy. The duo released the 1991 album Thursday's Fortune before Flanagan went solo.

The first single from her debut album, Bravado, was "Lap It Up" which hit No. 52 in the Triple J Hottest 100, 1994. The album was produced by Martin Armiger and featured Paul Hester from Crowded House on drums.

She also received significant radio and MTV play for her cover of Prince's "When You Were Mine" from her EP Seven Flights Up which was released on her own independent label, Penny Dreadful Records.

In 1997, she contributed an offbeat cover of Kylie Minogue's "Better the Devil You Know" to the soundtrack of the Australian film Dust Off The Wings and released a music video for the song that aired on MTV and Rage.

Her next release, Light Sleeper, was praised by Australian Rolling Stone Australia magazine as "a mature and intelligent release from a genuine talent, deserving of wider success." The album was produced by Tim Powles of the Church and featured a duet with Steve Kilbey on the track "Into the Sun". After the release of Light Sleeper she retreated from performing to focus on raising her three children.

=== Writing ===
In 1994 Flanagan published Changing The Sky, a children's book.

She published the adult novels Sing to Me (1998) and Surviving Hal (2018).

== Personal life ==
Her father, John Flanagan, was an Australian author best known for the Ranger's Apprentice novel series. She is the sister of actress and comedian Kitty Flanagan and since 2010 has toured with Kitty as part of her stand-up comedy shows. She writes original music for and performs songs in Kitty's show. She also has a brother, who is a chef and runs a coffee shop in the snowfields of Japan.

== Discography ==
=== Albums ===
List of albums, with selected chart positions
| Title | Album details | Peak chart positions |
| Title | Album details | AUS |
|---|---|---|
| Bravado (credited as Penny Flanagan and the New Moon) | Released: October 1994; Label: Mushroom Records (D 31207) | 117 |
| Light Sleeper | Released: February 1999; Label: Penny Dreadful Records (PD002) | 190 |

=== Extended plays ===
List of EPs, with selected details
| Title | Details |
|---|---|
| Seven Flights Up | Released: 1996; Label: Penny Dreadful Records (Stunt 023) |

=== Charting singles ===
List of singles, with selected chart positions
| Title | Year | Chart positions | Album |
| Title | Year | AUS | Album |
|---|---|---|---|
| "Lap it Up" | 1994 | 152 | Bravado |
| "The Sky" | 1995 | 152 | Bravado |
