= 12 Rules for Life =

2018 book by Jordan Peterson

12 Rules for Life: An Antidote to Chaos
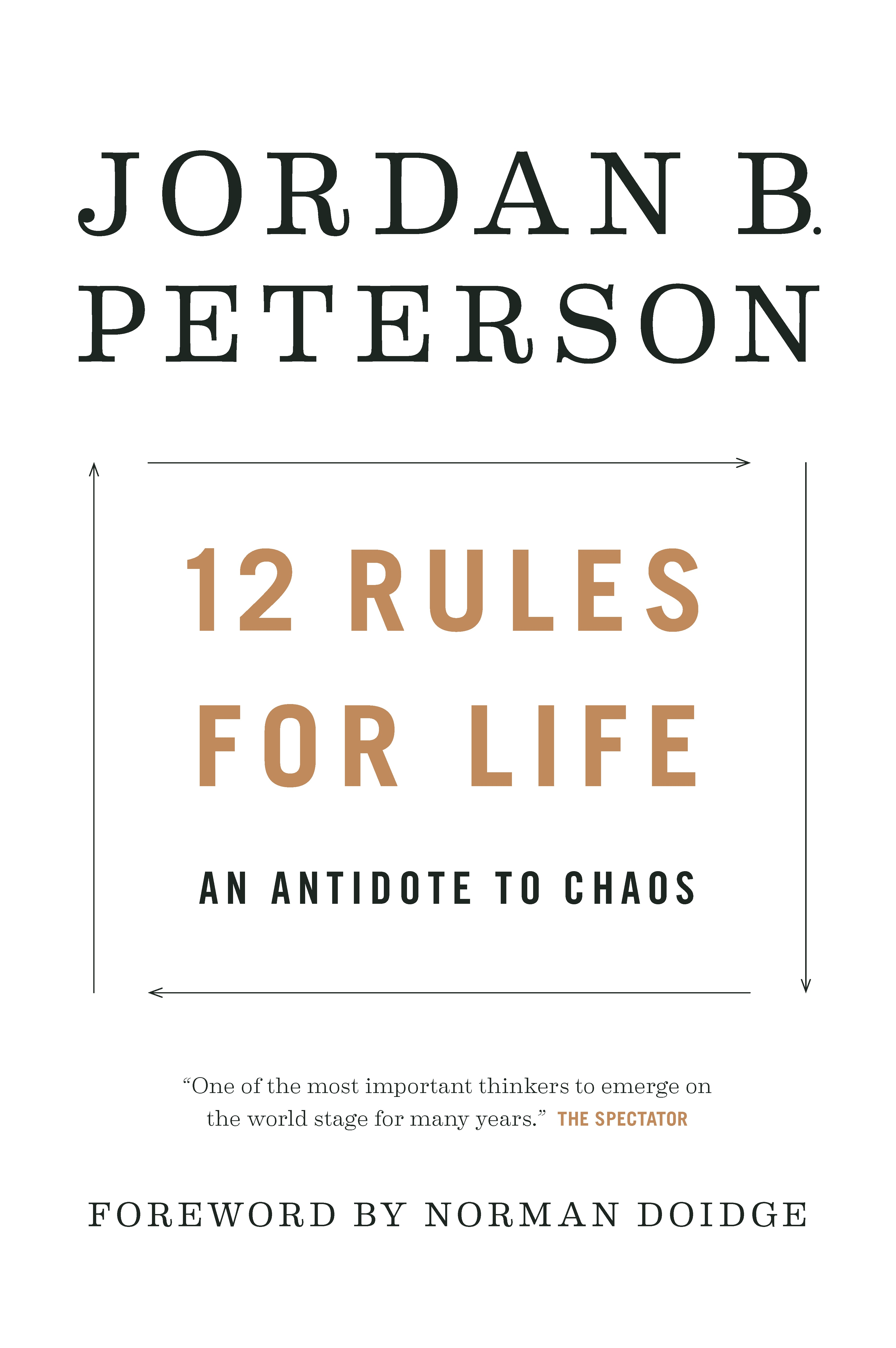
- First edition cover
- Author: Jordan Peterson
- Audio read by: Jordan Peterson
- Illustrator: Ethan Van Sciver
- Language: English
- Subjects: Self-help; psychology; philosophy
- Publisher: Random House Canada; Penguin Books (UK)
- Publication date: January 23, 2018 (Canada); January 16, 2018 (UK)
- Publication place: Canada
- Media type: Print, digital, audible
- Pages: 448 (hardcover); 320 (ebook)
- ISBN: 978-0-345-81602-3 (Canada); 978-0-241-35163-5 (UK)
- Dewey Decimal: 170/.44
- LC Class: BJ1589 P48 2018
- Followed by: Beyond Order

12 Rules for Life: An Antidote to Chaos is a 2018 self-help book by the Canadian clinical psychologist Jordan Peterson. It provides life advice through essays in abstract ethical principles, psychology, mythology, religion, and personal anecdotes. The book topped bestseller lists in Canada, the United States, and the United Kingdom, and had sold over ten million copies worldwide, as of May 2023.

Peterson went on a world tour to promote the book, receiving much attention following an interview with Channel 4 News. The book is written in a more accessible style than his previous academic book, Maps of Meaning: The Architecture of Belief (1999). A sequel, Beyond Order: 12 More Rules for Life, was published in March 2021.

== Overview ==
=== Background ===
Peterson's interest in writing the book grew out of a personal hobby of answering questions posted on Quora. One such question being "What are the most valuable things everyone should know?", to which his answer comprised 42 rules. The early vision and promotion of the book aimed to include all rules, with the title "42". Peterson stated that it "isn't only written for other people. It's a warning to me."

=== Rules ===
The book is divided into chapters with each title representing one of the following twelve specific rules for life as explained through an essay.

1. "Stand up straight with your shoulders back."
2. "Treat yourself like someone you are responsible for helping."
3. "Make friends with people who want the best for you."
4. "Compare yourself to who you were yesterday, not to who someone else is today."
5. "Do not let your children do anything that makes you dislike them."
6. "Set your house in perfect order before you criticize the world."
7. "Pursue what is meaningful (not what is expedient)."
8. "Tell the truth – or, at least, don't lie."
9. "Assume that the person you are listening to might know something you don't."
10. "Be precise in your speech."
11. "Do not bother children when they are skateboarding."
12. "Pet a cat when you encounter one on the street."

=== Content ===
The book's central idea is that "suffering is built into the structure of being" and, although it can be unbearable, people have a choice either to withdraw, which is a "suicidal gesture", or to face and transcend it. Living in a world of chaos and order, everyone has "darkness" that can "turn them into the monsters they're capable of being" to satisfy their dark impulses in the right situations. Scientific experiments like the Invisible Gorilla Test show that perception is adjusted to aims, and it is better to seek meaning rather than happiness. Peterson notes:

It's all very well to think the meaning of life is happiness, but what happens when you're unhappy? Happiness is a great side effect. When it comes, accept it gratefully. But it's fleeting and unpredictable. It's not something to aim at – because it's not an aim. And if happiness is the purpose of life, what happens when you're unhappy? Then you're a failure.

The book advances the idea that people are born with an instinct for ethics and meaning, and should take responsibility to search for meaning above their own interests (Rule 7, "Pursue what is meaningful, not what is expedient"). Such thinking is reflected both in contemporary stories such as Pinocchio, The Lion King, and Harry Potter, and in ancient stories from the Bible. To "Stand up straight with your shoulders back" (Rule 1) is to "accept the terrible responsibility of life," to make self-sacrifice, because the individual must rise above victimization and "conduct his or her life in a manner that requires the rejection of immediate gratification, of natural and perverse desires alike." The comparison to neurological structures and behavior of lobsters is used as a natural example to the formation of social hierarchies.

The other parts of the work explore and criticize the state of young men; the upbringing that ignores sex differences between boys and girls (criticism of over-protection and tabula rasa model in social sciences); male–female interpersonal relationships; school shootings; religion and moral nihilism; relativism; and lack of respect for the values that built Western society.

In the last chapter, Peterson outlines the ways in which one can cope with the most tragic events, which are very often out of one's control. In it, he describes his own personal struggle upon discovering that his daughter, Mikhaila, had a rare bone disease. The chapter is a meditation on how to maintain a watchful eye on, and cherish, life's small redeemable qualities, e.g., to "pet a cat when you encounter one". It also outlines a practical way to deal with hardship: to shorten one's temporal scope of responsibility, e.g., by focusing on the next minute rather than the next three months.

Canadian psychiatrist and psychoanalyst Norman Doidge wrote the book's foreword, with the help of Anuar Kul-Mukkhamed, a student at the University of Chicago.

== Publication ==
=== Marketing ===
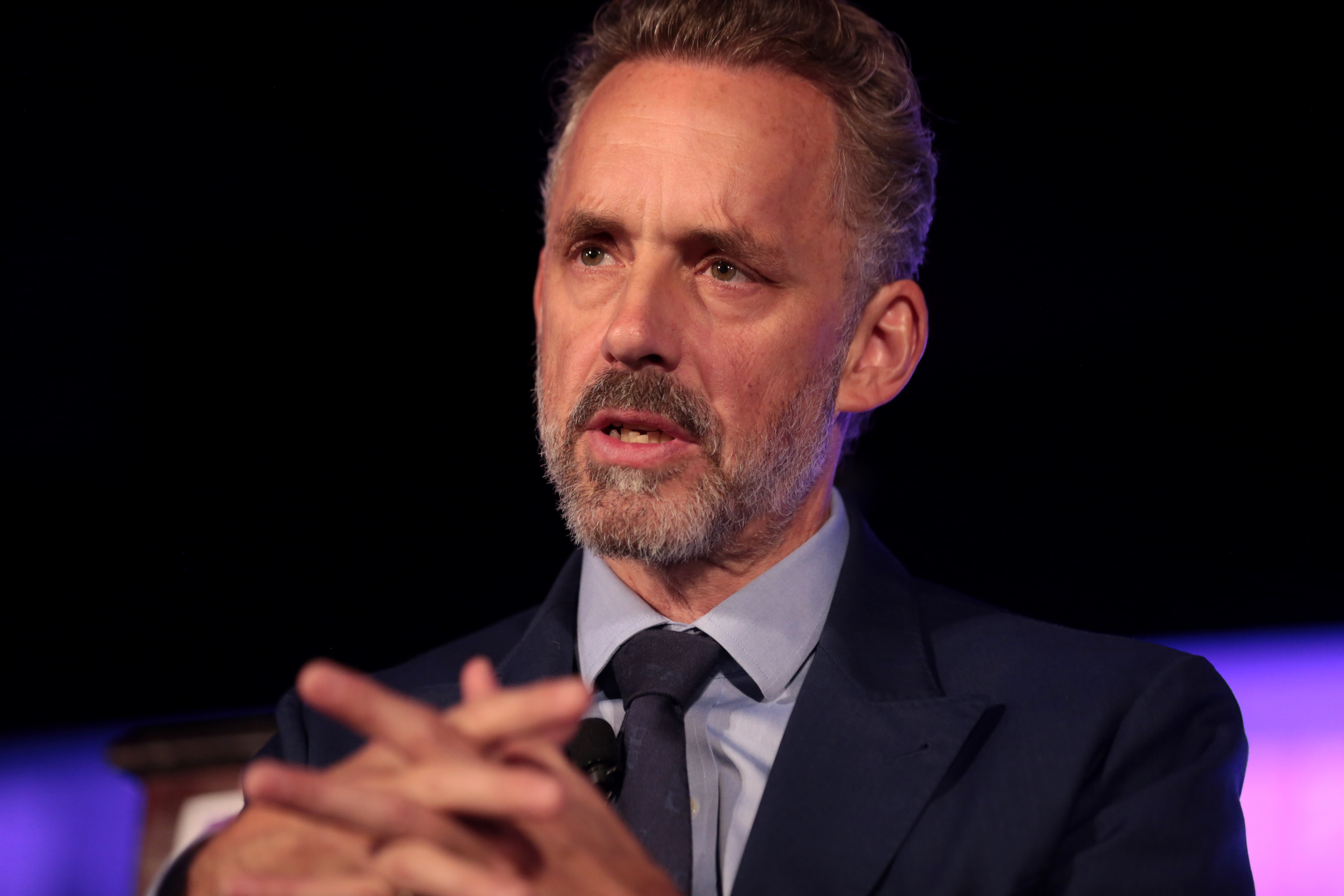
Jordan Peterson speaking at an event in Dallas, Texas, in June 2018

To promote the book, Peterson went on a world tour, initially from January 14, 2018, to February 17, 2018, including events in England, Canada, and the United States. The sold-out venues included 1,000-seat conference hall Emmanuel Centre in London, and 2,000-seat Orpheum Theatre in Los Angeles. The February 11 event at Citadel Theatre in Edmonton was cancelled by the theatre's board of directors and management, for which they later apologized, and instead was held at a sold-out Hyatt Place.

The second part included three sold-out events in March in Australia, continuing at Beacon Theatre in New York, and the third part held between early May and June initially numbering ten events in the US and Canada and one in the UK. Until June, the tour visited 45 cities in North America, Europe and Australia, reaching an audience of over 100,000 people. According to Peterson, nearly 200,000 people attended the live events until late July.

As part of the tour, Peterson had an interview on Channel 4 News that went viral, receiving considerable attention and nearly 49 million views on YouTube. He also appeared on BBC Radio 5 Live and BBC's HARDtalk; LBC's Maajid Nawaz radio show; Fox & Friends and Tucker Carlson Tonight; ABC's 7.30; Sky News Australia's Outsiders; HBO's Real Time with Bill Maher; and The Dr. Oz Show, among others.

=== Release ===
Penguin Allen Lane published the book on January 16, 2018, in the UK. Random House Canada published it on January 23 in Canada. As of September 2018, the book was slated to be translated into 45 languages.

The 12 Rules for Life audiobook was number one on Audible in Canada, and number three in the US. In Canada, since its debut, it topped The Globe and Mail's and the Toronto Star's nonfiction bestsellers lists. According to CBC Books, it was the 4th-bestselling Canadian book of the year. According to the Toronto Star, it was the "biggest Canadian book success story of the year", topping original nonfiction and Canadian nonfiction categories, with only Canadian poet writer Rupi Kaur having similar sales. Kobo Inc. reported that it was the 2nd-bestselling audiobook of 2018 in Canada. Per BookNet Canada and BNC SalesData, the print book was 3rd, and Peterson was the bestselling Canadian author of the year.

In the UK the book enjoyed five weeks at the top of The Sunday Times's bestsellers list for general hardcover (February 18 – March 25, again on April 15), selling over 120,000 copies by September 16. According to The Sunday Times, the hardback edition was the year's 4th-biggest seller in the "general hardbacks" category with 153,160 copies sold by end of the year. According to The Guardian, the Nielsen BookScan reported sales of 147,899 copies made it only the 32nd bestselling book of the year.

The Nielsen BookScan reported sales of over 10,000 copies until March 12 in Australia. In Ireland it was the 23rd-bestselling book of the year with 14,408 copies.

In the US, the book became the number-one nonfiction book and e-book on The Wall Street Journal's Best-Selling Books list. It also topped The Washington Post's and Reuters's US bestsellers list, reached number two on USA Today's overall list, and topped the hardcover nonfiction and top 10 overall category for Publishers Weekly, selling over 559,000 copies by September 24, 2018. In the category it replaced Michael Wolff's Fire and Fury. At the end of the year the hardcover version was the 11th-bestselling book, with 692,238 copies.

Penguin Random House CEO Markus Dohle said in late March that the book had already sold over 700,000 copies in the US. The book did not chart on The New York Times, Los Angeles Times and IndieBound bestsellers list. According to Toronto Star books editor Deborah Dundas, the New York Times stated it was not counted because it was published by a Canadian company. According to Random House Canada, the book was handled properly for the US market.

Peterson announced the book had sold over 2 million copies (August 6, 2018), then 3 million copies (January 13, 2019), and later that work had begun on a sequel (January 2019). The book reached 5 million sales by November 2020. By May 2023 the book had sold over 10 million copies.

In March 2019, Whitcoulls, one of New Zealand's leading book retailers, temporarily removed the book from their stores and online catalogue, apparently in reaction to the Christchurch mosque shootings. The withdrawal of the book was prompted by social media photos of Peterson posing with a fan wearing a T-shirt saying "I'm a proud Islamophobe." Peterson and his supporters strongly criticized Whitcoulls's decision because Whitcoulls continued to sell Adolf Hitler's Mein Kampf and Henry Malone's Islam Unmasked. The book was reinstated six days after it was removed.

== Reception ==
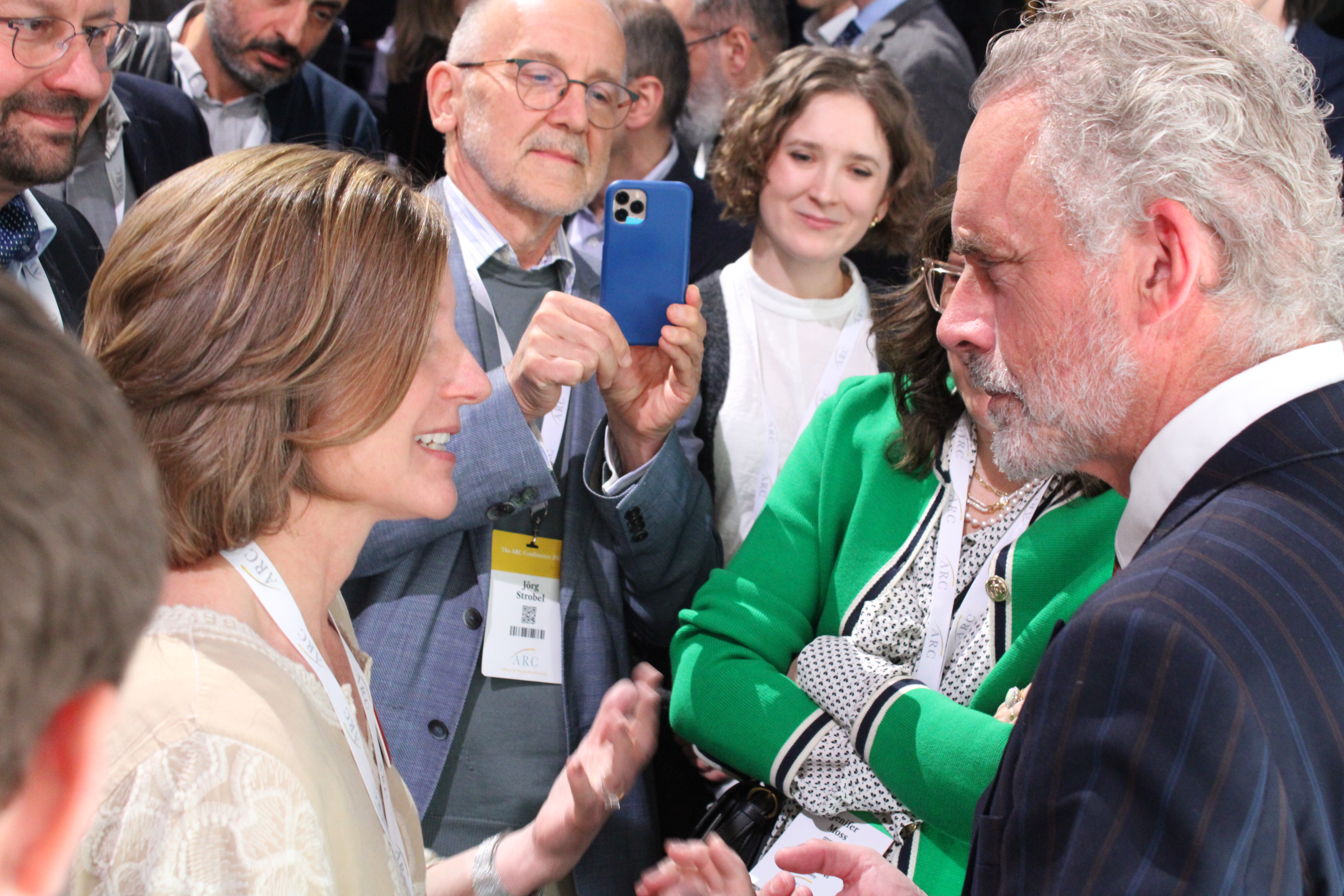
Jordan Peterson, the book's author, in conversation with Kimberly Ells, 2025

The book was received with mixed reviews. Melanie Reid, for The Times, said the book is "aimed at teenagers, millennials and young parents...If you peel back the verbiage, the cerebral preening, you are left with a hardline self-help manual of self-reliance, good behaviour, self-betterment and individualism that probably reflects [Peterson's] childhood in rural Canada in the 1960s." Bryan Appleyard, also in The Times, describes it as "a less dense and more practical version of Maps of Meaning...a baggy, aggressive, in-your-face, get-real book that, ultimately, is an attempt to lead us back to what Peterson sees as the true, the beautiful and the good – i.e., God."

Hari Kunzru of The Guardian said it collates advice from Peterson's clinical practice with anecdotes, accounts of his academic work as a psychologist and "a lot of intellectual history of the 'great books' variety", but the essays are explained in an overcomplicated style. Kunzru called Peterson sincere, but found the book irritating because he considers Peterson failed to follow his own rules.

In an interview with Peterson for The Guardian, Tim Lott called the book atypical of the self-help genre. For The Scotsman, Bill Jamieson praised it as "richly illustrated and packed with excellent advice on how we can restore meaning and a sense of progression to our everyday lives", describing it as "verbal waterboarding for supporters of big government".

The New York Times's David Brooks wrote, "The Peterson way is a harsh way, but it is an idealistic way – and for millions of young men, it turns out to be the perfect antidote to the cocktail of coddling and accusation in which they are raised".

Joe Humphreys of The Irish Times argued people should not be stopped "from reading what is a veritable powerhouse of a book: wise, provocative, humorous and also maddeningly contradictory...". Glenn Ellmers in Claremont Review of Books wrote that Peterson "does not shrink from telling readers that life means pain and suffering. His deft exposition, however, makes clear that duty is often liberating and responsibility can be a gift".

Dorothy Cummings McLean, writing for The Catholic World Report, called the book "the most thought-provoking self-help book I have read in years", with its rules reminding her of those by Bernard Lonergan, and content "serving as a bridge between Christians and non-Christians interested in the truths of human life and in resisting the lies of ideological totalitarianism".

In a review for the same magazine, Bishop Robert Barron praised the archetypal reading of the story about Adam and Eve and the Garden of Eden with Jesus representing "gardener" and the psychological exploration of Aleksandr Solzhenitsyn and The Gulag Archipelago, but did not support its "gnosticizing tendency to read Biblical religion purely psychologically and philosophically and not at all historically", or the idea that "God ... [is] simply a principle or an abstraction". It is "valuable for the beleaguered young men in our society, who need a mentor to tell them to stand up straight and act like heroes", Barron wrote.

Adam DeVille took a very different view, calling 12 Rules for Life "unbearably banal, superficial, and insidious" and saying "the real danger in this book is its apologia for social Darwinism and bourgeois individualism covered over with a theological patina" and that "in a just world, this book would never have been published".

Ron Dart, for The British Columbia Review, considered the book "an attempt to articulate a more meaningful order for freedom as an antidote to the erratic ... chaos of our age", but although "necessary" with exemplary advice for men and women it is "hardly a sufficient text for the tougher questions that beset us on our all too human journey and should be read as such." For the Financial Times, Julian Baggini wrote, "In headline form, most of his rules are simply timeless good sense.... The problem is that when Peterson fleshes them out, they carry more flab than meat".

In The Spectator, Peter Hitchens wrote that he did not like the "conversational and accessible" style and amount of "recapitulation", but believed it had "moving moments", "good advice" with a message "aimed at people who have grown up in the post-Christian West" with special appeal to young men. Park MacDougald of New York shared a similar view, writing that on paper Peterson lacks the "coherence, emotional depth" of his lectures but "still, he produces nuggets of real insight."

Pankaj Mishra's review in The New York Review of Books called 12 Rules a repackaged collection of pieties and late 19th-century Jungian mysticism that has been discredited by modern psychology. Mishra compared the book to historical authors who influenced Peterson, but whose serious moral failings, including racism and fascism, Peterson fails to address. He criticized Peterson's book for failing to recognize how traditionalism and myth can be used in support of demagoguery and anti-democratic ideas, and asserts that Peterson's work is a symptom of the problems it attempts to cure. Peterson responded to the review on Twitter, taking umbrage at Mishra's description of Peterson's friendship with First Nations artist Charles Joseph as "the latest in a long line of eggheads pretentiously but harmlessly romancing the noble savage"; Peterson responded, "If you were in my room at the moment, I'd slap you happily."

For Psychology Today, philosopher Paul Thagard called the book flimsy and said Peterson's views fail to stand up to philosophical scrutiny, "If you go for Christian mythology, narrow-minded individualism, obscure metaphysics, and existentialist angst, then Jordan Peterson is the philosopher for you. But if you prefer evidence and reason, look elsewhere." Psychologist John Grohol, in PsychCentral, said the advice was sound, self-evident, and harmless, but could not recommend it because Peterson justified his advice with rambling tangential anecdotes and religious dogma instead of scientific data.

In the Los Angeles Review of Books, Guy Stevenson wrote that Peterson's work is ignored by serious academics, in part because of his inflated claims targeting a conspiracy of "postmodern neo-Marxists", but that his level of celebrity had not been seen for a public intellectual since Marshall McLuhan in the 1960s. According to Stevenson, Peterson's practical advice and Jungian mysticism reflect a new counterculture movement similar to that of the 1960s. He called 12 Rules aggressive and overeager to blame problems on "bogeymen", and recommended as an alternative the work of John Gray, who has addressed the same issues.

Kelefa Sanneh of The New Yorker noted:

some of his critics might be surprised to find much of the advice he offers unobjectionable, if old-fashioned: he wants young men to be better fathers, better husbands, better community members. In this way, he might be seen as an heir to older gurus of manhood like Elbert Hubbard, who in 1899 published a stern and wildly popular homily called A Message to Garcia ... At times, Peterson emphasizes his interest in empirical knowledge and scientific research—although these tend to be the least convincing parts of 12 Rules for Life.

David French of National Review called the book a "beacon of light" for the current time, with a simple but profound purpose "to help a person look in the mirror and respect the person he or she sees." Some critics, such as National Review's Heather Wilhelm and Toronto Star's James Grainger, were critical of negative reviews they believed had misinterpreted Peterson.

In September 2018, Peterson threatened to sue Cornell University philosopher Kate Manne for defamation after she called his work misogynistic in an interview with Vox. Manne called Peterson's threat an attempt to chill free speech. Vox considered the threat baseless and ignored it. In a critique often shared by prominent intellectual Noam Chomsky, Nathan Robinson of Current Affairs called Peterson a "charlatan" who gives "the most elementary fatherly life-advice" while adding "convolutions to disguise the simplicity of his mind."

In an article published in 2020 in the International Journal of Jungian Studies, "Carl Jung, John Layard and Jordan Peterson: Assessing Theories of Human Social Evolution and Their Implications for Analytical Psychology", Gary Clark offers a sustained critique of Peterson's thought as outlined in 12 Rules for Life. The article asserts that Peterson fails to take account of research in paleoanthropology, evolutionary anthropology and ethnographic studies of egalitarian societies. Such societies, which are believed to represent the ancient forager adaptation of H. sapiens, are matrilineal and lack social hierarchy. The author argues that a major sociocultural transformation occurred from this ancient adaptive complex with the onset of agriculture giving rise to modern patrilineal and hierarchical cultures. This view contrasts with Peterson's, which postulates modern social and economic structures are an outgrowth of the hierarchical impulses of our premammalian, mammalian and primate ancestors. This led the author to conclude that Peterson seems to have "projected his own cultural biases back into the deep past".

In one of the only academic reviews of the book, B.V.E. Hyde wrote in Philosophy Now that Peterson has been misrepresented as pessimistic and far-right, arguing instead that his work is ultimately optimistic and sensible. Hyde concluded that Peterson's significance stems from "his realism about the human condition, his optimism about how to transcend it, and the simplicity of his injunctions," which provide psychological guidance during complex times. Hyde noted that Peterson's self-help advice is "almost commonsensical" and that he "writes forcefully for propositions which are largely unremarkable and, at bottom, totally agreeable," crediting this as the source of his books' appeal.
