= Karen Taylor (comedian) =

English actress and comedian

- Born: 5 May 1976 (age 50); Barrow-in-Furness, Cumbria, England
- Occupations: Actress, comedian
- Years active: 2001–present
- Children: 2

Karen Taylor (born 5 May 1976) is an English actress and comedian. She is a former finalist in the Daily Telegraph Open Mic Award and has fronted her own sketch show on BBC Three, titled Touch Me, I'm Karen Taylor.

== University ==
Taylor studied Theatre Studies at the University of Warwick 1994–1998, where she got to know other future actors Stephen Merchant and Hannah Waterman.

== Life and career ==
Taylor was a finalist in the Open Mic Award in 1999 and came further to prominence at the Edinburgh Festival in 2000. Her first major television role was as one of the performers in The Sketch Show on ITV, which ran for two series. She has also fronted FAQ U on Channel 4 and appeared performing with Steve Coogan on a Paul Calf DVD. In 2004, Taylor appeared on an episode of Win, Lose or Draw (a late-night version presented by Liza Tarbuck) for ITV.

In 2007, Taylor fronted her first television sketch show, Touch Me, I'm Karen Taylor. It was first aired in June 2007 on BBC Three. Its initial reviews were generally positive. The show's "raunchy" and "lascivious" nature was noted by many of the critics, with almost all of the sketches involving characters whose main interest was "sex". Although described as potentially a "one-trick pony", the show was also lauded as "really, really funny" and "more amusing than the last eleventeen sketch shows you can think of". The show returned for a second series in July 2008. That month also saw the release of British comedy film Angus, Thongs and Perfect Snogging, in which Taylor starred as the mother of the main character, Georgia.

On 11 November 2011, she appeared on Celebrity Mastermind, answering questions on the specialist subject of Fred Dibnah. In 2013, she played Elaine Whyte in Father Figure. In September 2014, Taylor appeared in Series 2 Episode 3 of BBC comedy Big School, playing the part of Ryan's mum, Trish. In December 2018, she appeared in Care, a single episode drama (BBC).

== Personal life ==
Taylor married on 15 November 2009. She has two children.

== Filmography ==
=== Film ===
Year	Film	Role	Notes
2008	Angus, Thongs and Perfect Snogging	Connie Nicolson	
2018	Care	Claire's Boss	TV film

=== Television ===
Year	Title	Role	Notes
2001–2004	The Sketch Show	Various Roles	Series regular
2007–2008	Touch Me, I'm Karen Taylor	Various Roles	Series regular
2013	Father Figure	Elaine Whyte	Series regular
2013	Doctors	Rhoda McDonagh	Episode: "Two Lemons and a Bar"
2014	Big School	Trish	1 episode
2017	Loaded	Photographer	Episode: "Leon's Teacher"
