= Baland Jalal =

Danish neuroscientist

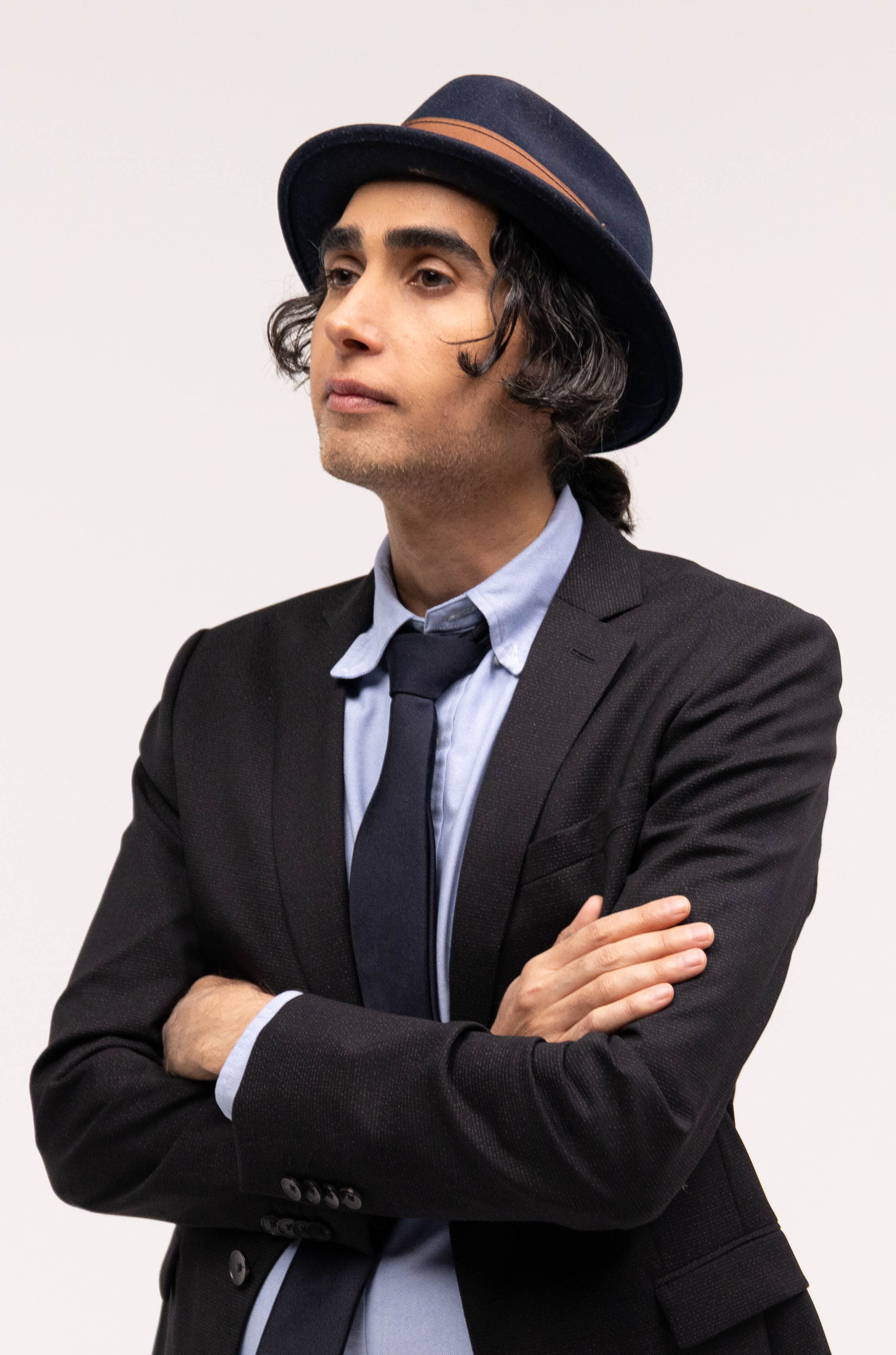
- Baland Jalal in 2025
- Born: October 14, 1985 (age 41); Bulgaria
- Occupation: Neuroscientist · Author · Educator
- Known for: Research in neuroscience and psychiatry, sleep conditions, hallucinations, consciousness, obsessive–compulsive disorder, and mood disorders

Academic background
- Education: Trinity College, University of Cambridge (PhD, 2020)
- Thesis: "Vicarious Exposure": Experimental Studies Towards Developing Novel Therapies for Obsessive-Compulsive Disorder (2020)
- Doctoral advisor: Barbara Sahakian · Trevor Robbins
- Influences: V. S. Ramachandran Oliver Sacks

Academic work
- Discipline: Neuroscience; Psychology; Psychiatry
- Institutions: Harvard University; University of Cambridge
- Notable works: The Phantom Mind; Hack Your Brain; Transdiagnostic Multiplex CBT for Muslim Cultural Groups
- Website: balandjalal.com

Signature
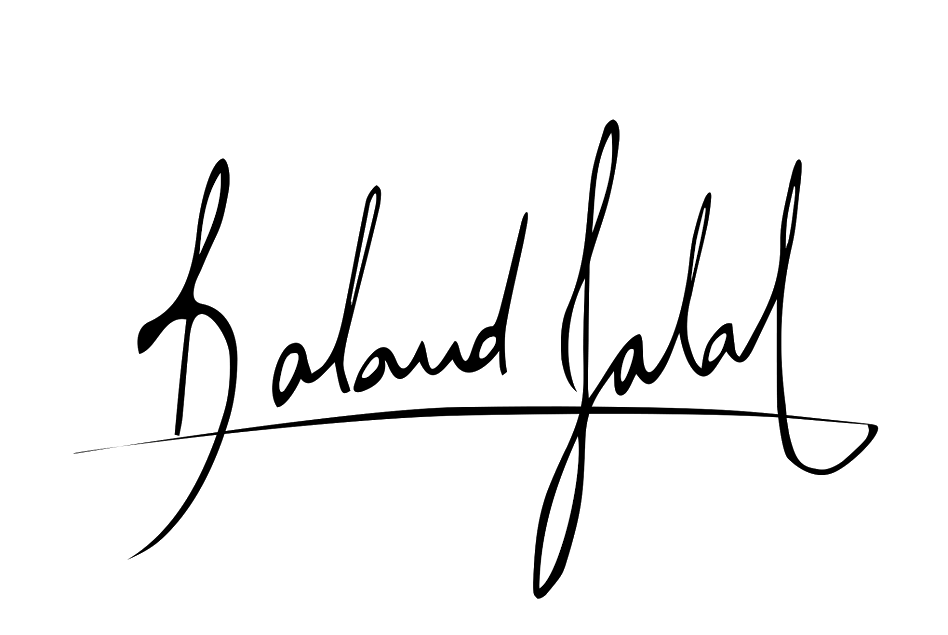

Baland Jalal (/bæˈlænd dʒuˈlɑːl/ ba-LAND ju-LAHL; born October 14, 1985) is a Danish neuroscientist at Harvard University's Department of Psychology. He was previously a visiting researcher at the University of Cambridge, where he earned his PhD. His work spans clinical neuroscience, neuropsychiatry, and the biology of altered state of consciousness. Originally from Denmark and of Kurdish-Iraqi descent, he is best known for his research on sleep and related disorders of emotions and perception.

Jalal's books explore neurological and psychiatric conditions such as sleep paralysis, capgras syndrome, temporal lobe epilepsy, autism, obsessive–compulsive disorder, and narcolepsy. His books include the forthcoming The Phantom Mind: Insights from the Borderlands of Sleep (Penguin, 2026), which examines sleep disorders and consciousness, Hack Your Brain (Gyldendal, 2026), a popular science book on the brain, and Transdiagnostic Multiplex CBT for Muslim Cultural Groups: Treating Emotional Disorders, which presents a culturally adapted psychotherapy framework, published by Cambridge University Press.

In 2023, Expertscape ranked him as the leading global expert on sleep paralysis. Media outlets including CNN, the BBC, The Sunday Times and The Daily Telegraph have also described him as the leading authority on the topic.

Jalal has been active in public science communication. He has delivered TEDx talks and given public lectures at academic institutions, including the University of Oxford and Harvard University. He has also appeared on podcasts including The Jordan Peterson Podcast, Science Vs, and Lewis Howes's School of Greatness where he has discussed various topics in neuroscience including sleep, dreams, and neurological disorders.

As of 2023, he has also been teaching neuroscience courses at Peterson Academy, an online education platform.

== Early life and education ==
Jalal was born in Bulgaria to Kurdish parents who had fled the war in Iraq and later moved to Denmark. In a 2022 interview with Vox, he recounted spending part of his childhood in a refugee camp before growing up in a disadvantaged neighborhood in Denmark marked by violence and gang activity. In interviews with Danish media, he has recalled navigating a difficult social environment during his upbringing, while also describing his home life as stable and supportive.

Jalal has stated that he struggled academically in his early schooling and did not initially perform well in formal education. He has attributed this in part to a lack of academic role models and what he has described as limited institutional encouragement within his school environment.

In an interview with the Danish newspaper Politiken, Jalal noted:

“We were six different nationalities in my class and caused a lot of disruption. And the teachers were — with few exceptions — authoritarian types. They did not motivate us to invest in education as a path to a better and more secure life.”

In the same interview he stated that during this period he disengaged from formal schooling and spent much of his time daydreaming or disrupting classes, but described a shift in motivation during high school after developing an interest in reading and self-directed learning.

Jalal has recounted experiencing episodes of sleep paralysis from a young age, which he later cited as an influence on his interest in the scientific study of the brain and mind. In a 2017 interview with VICE News, he recalled one particularly frightening episode: “My eyes were open but I couldn’t move my limbs. Something evil was pressing on my chest, strangling me, and my legs were being pulled up and down—I thought I was going to die”.

He went on to pursue neuroscience at Trinity College, University of Cambridge, where he earned his Ph.D., completing part of his doctoral research at Harvard University's Department of Psychology.

== Career ==
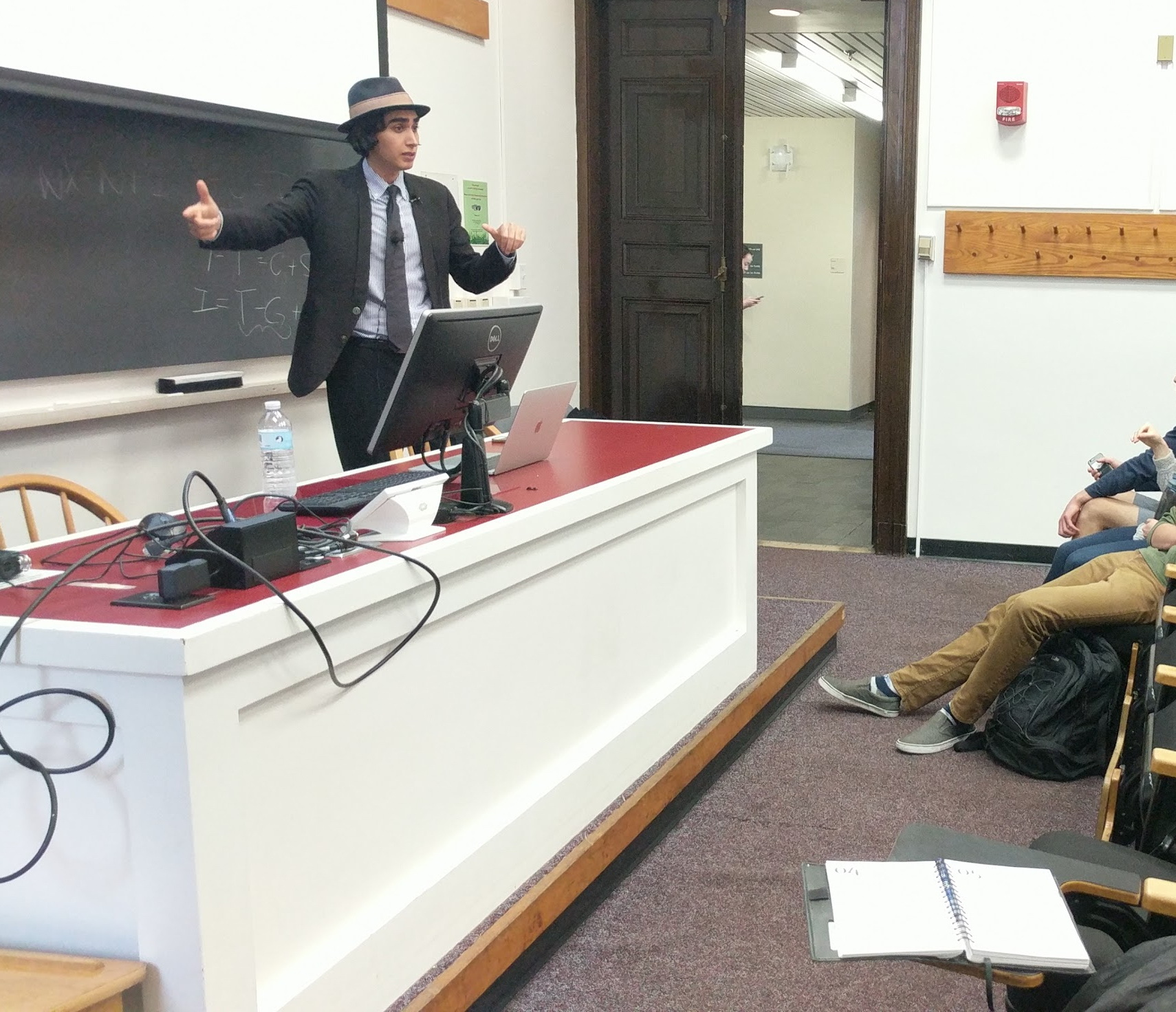
Baland Jalal giving a lecture at Harvard

Jalal is a neuroscientist at the Harvard University Department of Psychology. He previously served as a research consultant at McLean Hospital, a Harvard Medical School teaching hospital, and was a visiting researcher at the University of Cambridge, where he earned his Ph.D. from Trinity College. At Cambridge, he conducted research under neuroscientists Barbara Sahakian and Trevor Robbins at the Behavioural and Clinical Neuroscience Institute.

During his time at Harvard, Jalal completed postdoctoral research under psychologist Richard J. McNally, who also served as a co-supervisor during his doctoral training. Jalal was a Fellow at Harvard University in 2016 and 2018. He was later offered a Research Fellow position at Harvard Medical School and McLean Hospital, with a planned progression to a faculty appointment as Instructor or Assistant Professor, but declined the offer. Jalal has published more than 50 scientific papers.

Early in his career, Jalal collaborated with V. S. Ramachandran, in California, whom he describes as a mentor and "like a second father". He received training in Ramachandran’s laboratory at the University of California, San Diego, where he was also a visiting scholar. Ramachandran has described Jalal as a “rara avis” with “a creative and inventive mind”. A 2016 profile in Business Insider described their collaboration as formative to Jalal's later research on the brain and neuropsychiatric disorders. The two went on to co-author ten scientific papers. In a 2021 interview with Frontiers, Jalal recalled that Ramachandran had introduced him to neurologist Oliver Sacks, and that Jalal and Sacks subsequently exchanged correspondence discussing neurological and experiential aspects of the brain.

Jalal with V. S. Ramachandran and Oliver Sacks at UC San Diego in 2012

He has been invited to lecture at universities in the United States and Europe, including a talk at Oxford University's Sherrington Society, one of the university's long-established medical societies, Harvard's Society for Mind, Brain and Behavior and London School of Economics.

Alongside his research, Jalal works as an author and public educator. His public career includes popular science books with Penguin and a series of online neuroscience courses at Peterson Academy. He also gives public lectures, is a frequent guest on podcasts, and writes op-eds. His writing and teaching explores neuroscience and psychology subjects such as dreams, consciousness, romantic attraction, brain plasticity, mental health, performance, and well-being.

== Research and theory ==
Jalal’s research spans neuroscience and psychiatry, including the mechanisms underlying perception, consciousness, and mental disorders. His work combines experimental and clinical research, and cross-cultural approaches to study sleep conditions and dream states, hallucinations, anxiety-related conditions, and obsessive–compulsive disorder. He has also contributed to research on human motivation and subjective experience, including studies on outcome uncertainty and intrinsic motivation.

=== Sleep paralysis ===
Sleep paralysis, is a condition in which individuals experience temporary paralysis upon waking or falling asleep, often accompanied by vivid hallucinations. Jalal has conducted studies exploring sleep paralysis in diverse populations, including samples from Egypt, Italy, Poland, Denmark, Turkey, the United States, and South Africa. Jalal's findings have highlighted how cultural beliefs shape the experience, interpretation, and distress associated with sleep paralysis. In a 2023 essay in TIME Magazine, he wrote:

“Once sleep paralysis is feared as a mythical monster, anxiety runs amok, triggering unwanted awakenings at night and effectively more sleep paralysis. This vicious cycle perpetually feeds into itself until sleep paralysis becomes chronic, prolonged and potentially pathological.”

In collaboration with V. S. Ramachandran, Jalal has proposed several hypotheses to explain why people experience hallucinations of ghosts and intruders during sleep paralysis. Their theories explore the roles of the right superior parietal lobule, body image projection, mirror neurons, and the neuropharmacology of hallucinations.

Jalal developed one of the first treatment approaches for sleep paralysis, known as Meditation-Relaxation Therapy (MR Therapy). The method combines cognitive reappraisal, emotional distancing, focused attention, and relaxation techniques to help manage recurrent episodes. In collaboration with researchers at the University of Bologna, he co-authored the first published clinical trial evaluating a treatment for sleep paralysis, which tested the MR Therapy approach.

Jalal in 2026

=== Obsessive–compulsive disorder (OCD) ===
In 2015 Jalal, working with V. S. Ramachandran, conducted some of the first studies using the rubber hand illusion to examine body image in obsessive–compulsive disorder (OCD). They found that when a rubber hand was "contaminated" with fake feces during the illusion, healthy participants reported experiencing OCD-like disgust. In 2019, collaborating with Richard J. McNally and V. S. Ramachandran, Jalal showed that OCD patients were more susceptible to the illusion—even when visual and tactile cues were misaligned—suggesting a more flexible body image. This research also proposed the illusion as a form of indirect exposure therapy for OCD.

In a 2017 study, Jalal and Ramachandran found that individuals with OCD symptoms experienced disgust simply by watching an experimenter contaminate themselves, and relief when watching them wash. In 2020, the findings were extended to a clinical OCD group with similar results. In later work with Barbara Sahakian and Ramachandran, Jalal tested a digital self-observation technique in which participants with subclinical OCD watched daily smartphone videos of themselves touching fake feces or washing their hands. After one week, participants showed measurable improvements in symptoms.

=== Motivation and emotion research ===
As an undergraduate student, Jalal co-authored research with Sami Abuhamdeh and Mihaly Csikszentmihalyi, one of the founders of positive psychology and the originator of the concept of flow. The studies found that close contests produced greater suspense, enjoyment and intrinsic motivation than decisive victories, despite producing lower perceptions of competence. In one experiment, 69% of participants chose to replay a game they had won narrowly rather than one they had won by a wide margin.

With V. S. Ramachandran, Jalal has also explored the brain basis for social emotions, including envy and jealousy. Discussing jealousy in personal relationships with NBC News, he was noted as stating: “Jealousy is hard-wired in all of us.” Their work on emotion was also discussed in a Los Angeles Review of Books essay on sibling rivalry.

== Reception ==
Jalal's research has been covered widely in international media. In 2025, CNN described him as "a leading expert on sleep paralysis." The BBC, VOX, The Sunday Times and The Daily Telegraph have likewise described him as "one of the world's leading experts" on the condition."

His app-based self-observation work for OCD were first described in the New Scientist and later reported in The Times and The Washington Post, which characterized them as "simple videos that researchers hope will help people who scrub their hands until they bleed." The Chicago Tribune described them as "new hope for those with ocd who scrub their hands until they bleed".

The New York Times and BBC News previously covered his use of the rubber hand illusion as a potential therapy, the latter calling it "a party trick involving a fake hand" used in new treatment studies for OCD, while Reuters noted it could help patients better tolerate exposure therapy.

BBC Future and PBS Nova have profiled his work on nightmares and sleep paralysis. The Guardian, Today, Der Spiegel, have also reported on his studies of hallucinations and cultural interpretations of the condition.

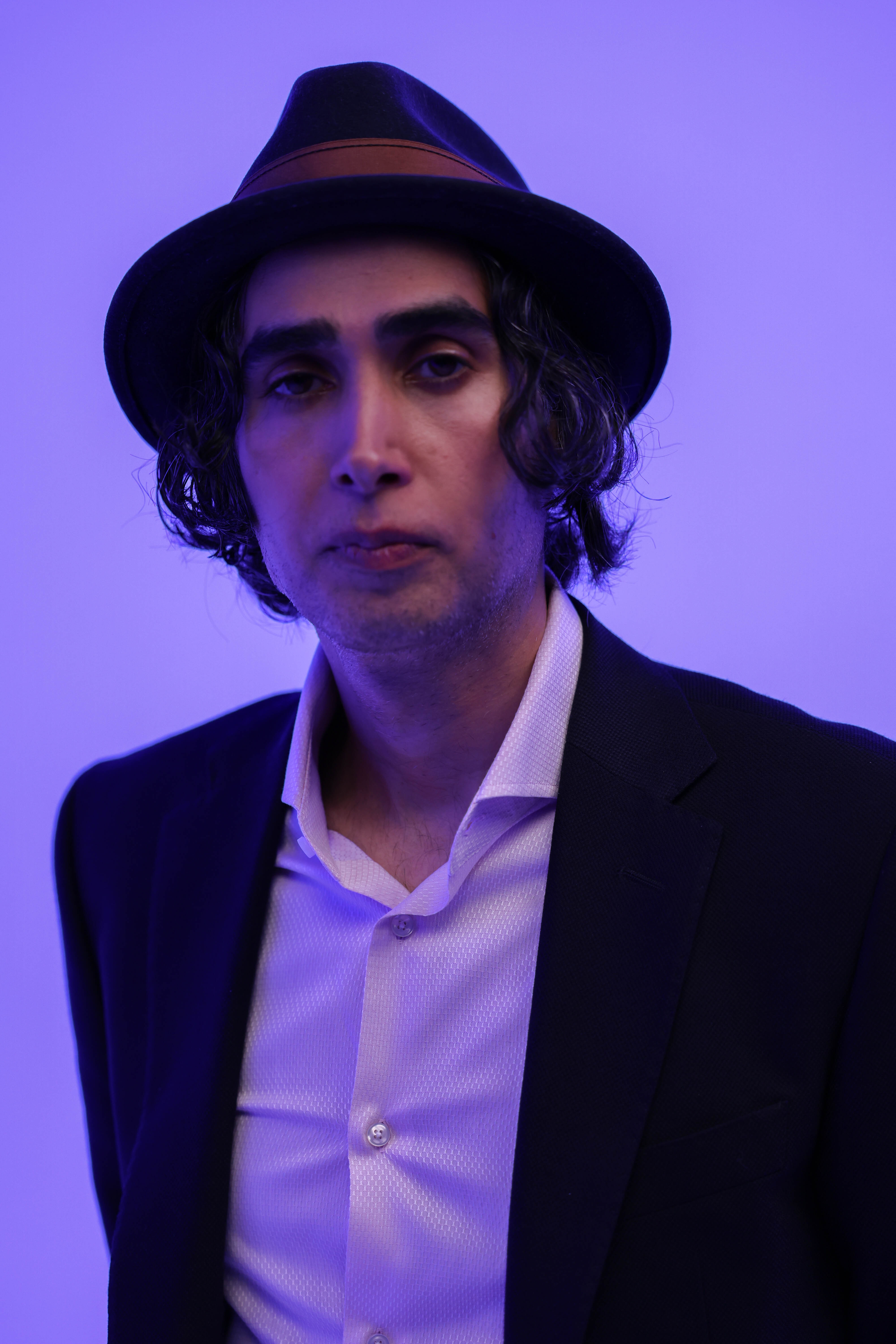
Baland Jalal at Peterson Academy in 2025

Expertscape has ranked Jalal as the leading global expert on sleep paralysis. His meditation-relaxation treatment for sleep paralysis was described in New York Magazine as "the most effective talisman against sleep paralysis."

Jalal has been active in public communication of science. He has appeared on podcasts including The Jordan B. Peterson Podcast, Science Vs, and The School of Greatness, where he has discussed topics such as sleep, dreams, nightmares, and psychiatric disorders. Jalal was interviewed by presenter Faith Salie about the neuroscience of envy for the Audible Original Envy Enlightened (2025). He has delivered TEDx talks and has lectured at public and academic institutions, including the University of Oxford and Harvard University.

He has written about topics in neuroscience including sleep, dreams, consciousness, and mental health, with work appearing in outlets such as Time, Scientific American, Big Think, and The Boston Globe.

Jalal's work has been covered by media such as CNN, The Washington Post, Today, NBC News, The Times, and others. He has also appeared on broadcast media, including NPR's The Pulse, and BBC's Victoria Derbyshire show and the BBC documentary Uncanny.

Since 2023, Jalal has taught nine eight-hour neuroscience courses at Peterson Academy, an online learning platform founded by Mikhaila Fuller and Jordan B Peterson. His courses include Introduction to Neuroscience, The Neuroscience of Human Nature, The Neuroscience of Dreams, the Neuroscience of Love, Intro to Neuropsychiatry, the Neuroscience of Well-Being and Optimal Performance, Intro to Neurology, Intro to the Neuroscience of Business and Marketing and Intro to Vision and Neuroasthetics.

== Personal life ==
In interviews, Jalal has described an international and travel-intensive working life, during which he has spent extended periods in different countries in connection with research, teaching, and public engagement. He has stated that throughout much of his career he has moved between Europe and the United States, often combining academic work with public lectures and media appearances. At the same time, he has expressed a desire in the longer term to settle more permanently and prioritize time with his family. He has stated that he is not married and does not have children.

Jalal has noted that Danish is his native language and that he speaks Kurdish with his parents. He grew up as the middle child in a family of three siblings. He has also stated that he learned Arabic during his studies in Egypt.

Jalal has described himself as Muslim in public interviews.

== Books ==
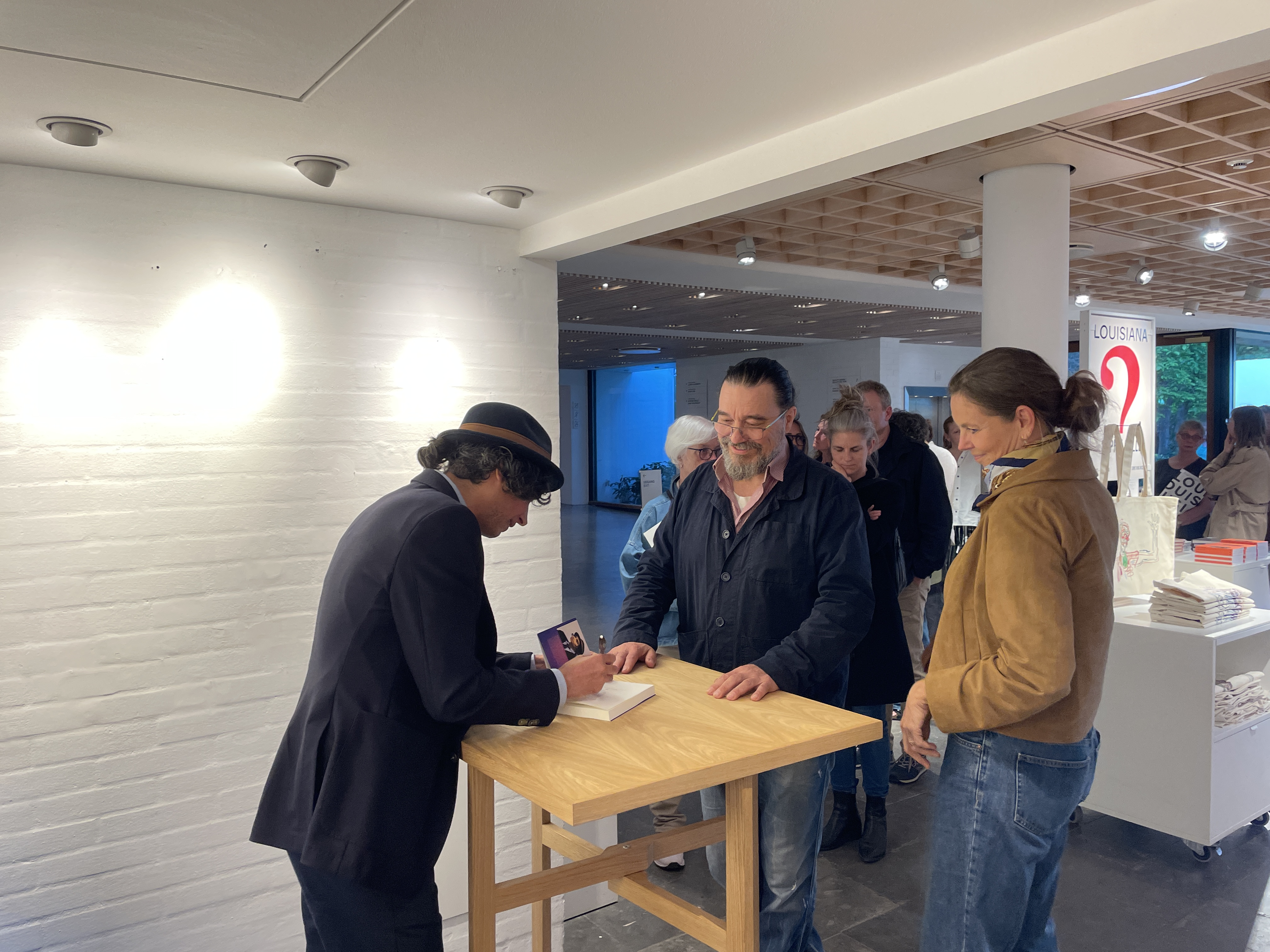
Jalal at book-signing event in Copenhagen in 2026

Jalal has authored and co-authored books spanning neuroscience, sleep science, and clinical psychology/psychiatry.

The Phantom Mind: Insights from the Borderlands of Sleep (Penguin, 2026) uses sleep conditions to examine hallucinations, predictive processing, cultural influences on perception, consciousness, and the sense of self. It uses these phenomena to consider broader questions about how expectations shape perception and how the brain constructs our experience of reality.

Hack din Hjerne (English: Hack Your Brain; Gyldendal, 2026) draws on neuroscience and Jalal’s experiences with sleep paralysis and nightmares to discuss fear, negative mental patterns, and psychological resilience.

Transdiagnostic Multiplex CBT for Muslim Cultural Groups: Treating Emotional Disorders (Cambridge University Press, 2020), co-authored with Devon E. Hinton, presents a culturally adapted cognitive behavioural therapy framework addressing anxiety, depression, somatic symptoms, sleep disturbance, and related emotional disorders.

- Jalal, Baland (2026-05-21). The Phantom Mind: Insights from the Borderlands of Sleep. Penguin Books. ISBN 9780241729434.
- Jalal, Baland (2026-02-03). Hack Your Brain ('Hack Din Hjerne', Danish). Gyldendal. ISBN 9788702352573.
- Hinton, Devon E.; Jalal, Baland (2020). Transdiagnostic Multiplex CBT for Muslim Cultural Groups: Treating Emotional Disorders. Cambridge University Press. ISBN 9781108671217. doi:10.1017/9781108671217

== See also ==
- Body image
- Hallucinations
- Obsessive-compulsive disorder
- Peterson Academy
- REM sleep
- Rubber hand illusion
- Sleep paralysis
- VS Ramachandran

== Selected publications ==
- Jalal, B.; Ramachandran, V. S. (2014). Sleep paralysis and “the bedroom intruder”: The role of the right superior parietal, phantom pain and body image projection. Medical Hypotheses. 83 (6): 755–757.
- Jalal, B.; Settlage, B. L.; Ramachandran, V. S. (2014). Science, epistemology, and future prospects for psychoanalysis. Neuropsychoanalysis. 16 (2): 115–127.
- Jalal, B.; Krishnakumar, D.; Ramachandran, V. S. (2015). “I feel contaminated in my fake hand”: Obsessive-compulsive-disorder-like disgust sensations arise from a dummy during the rubber hand illusion. PLoS One. 10 (12): e0139159. doi:10.1371/journal.pone.0139159.
- Jalal, B. (2016). How to make the ghosts in my bedroom disappear? Focused-attention meditation combined with muscle relaxation (MR therapy): A direct treatment intervention for sleep paralysis. Frontiers in Psychology. 7: 28. doi:10.3389/fpsyg.2016.00028.
- Jalal, B.; Ramachandran, V. S. (2017). “I feel your disgust and relief”: Can the action understanding system (mirror neuron system) be recruited to induce disgust and relief from contamination vicariously? Neurocase. 23 (1): 31–35. doi:10.1080/13554794.2017.1293703.
- Ramachandran, V. S.; Jalal, B. (2017). The evolutionary psychology of envy and jealousy. Frontiers in Psychology. 8: 1619. doi:10.3389/fpsyg.2017.01619.
- Jalal, B.; Bruhl, A. B.; O'Callaghan, C.; Piercy, T.; Cardinal, R. N.; Ramachandran, V. S.; Sahakian, B. J. (2018). Novel smartphone interventions improve cognitive flexibility and obsessive-compulsive disorder symptoms in individuals with contamination fears. Scientific Reports. doi:10.1038/s41598-018-29393-2.
- Jalal, B. (2018). The neuropharmacology of sleep paralysis hallucinations: Serotonin 2A activation and a novel therapeutic drug. Psychopharmacology. 235 (11): 3083–3091.
- Jalal, B.; Moruzzi, L.; Zangrandi, A.; Filardi, M.; Franceschini, C.; Pizza, F.; et al. (2020). Meditation-relaxation (MR therapy) for sleep paralysis: A pilot study in patients with narcolepsy. Frontiers in Neurology. 11: 922. doi:10.3389/fneur.2020.00922.
- Jalal, B.; McNally, R. J.; Elias, J.; Ramachandran, V. S. (2020). Vicarious exposure: “Spooky action” at a distance in obsessive-compulsive disorder. Journal of Obsessive-Compulsive and Related Disorders. doi:10.1016/j.jocrd.2020.100567.
