= Angela Roberts =

Angela Roberts may refer to:

- Angela Roberts (politician)
- Angela Roberts (curler)
- Angela Roberts (scientist)
