= Joseph Herbert =

Joseph or Joe Herbert may refer to:

- Joseph Herbert (neuroscientist) (born 1936), English scientist
- Joseph W. Herbert (1863–1923), English-American actor, writer and director
- Joseph Glenn Herbert (born 1971), American comedian better known as Jo Koy
- Joe Herbert (footballer) (1895–1959), English footballer for Rochdale.
