= Angela Roberts (scientist) =

British neurobiologist

- Education: University of Cambridge, University of Sussex
- Awards: Fellow of the Academy of Medical Sciences (2016)
- Scientific career
- Workplaces: University of Cambridge (1996–)
- Thesis: The neurendocrine basis of seasonal reproduction in the Syrian hamster
- Doctoral advisor: Joseph Herbert

Angela Charlotte Roberts FMedSci is a British neurobiologist who is a professor of physiology at the University of Cambridge. Her research considers the neural circuits that underpin cognition and emotion. She leads the Cambridge Marmoset Research Centre. She was awarded the 2020 Goldman-Rakic Prize for Outstanding Achievement in Cognitive Neuroscience.

== Early life and education ==
Roberts studied neurobiology at the University of Sussex. She moved to the University of Cambridge for doctoral research, where she worked on neuroendocrine control of reproduction with Joseph Herbert. She then worked as a postdoctoral research associate with Trevor Robbins and was awarded a Royal Society University Research Fellowship. Her postdoctoral research considered the neural and neurochemical basis of cognitive flexibility in marmosets. In 1996, she joined the Department of Anatomy, where she started to explore emotion regulation.

== Research and career ==
Roberts' research considers behavioural neuroscience. She was made a professor at the University of Cambridge in 2010. She was the first to identify different forms of cognitive flexibility in the prefrontal cortex, and to show that they had different sensitivities to neurochemicals (e.g. dopamine and serotonin). She combines neural, pharmacological, cardiovascular and genetic techniques to understand the basal ganglia and amygdala. Roberts is scientific lead of the Cambridge Marmoset Research Centre at Cambridge.

== Awards and honours ==
- 2016 Fellowship of the Academy of Medical Sciences
- 2020 Goldman-Rakic Prize for Outstanding Achievement in Cognitive Neuroscience
- 2020 European Brain and Behaviour Prize lecture

== Selected publications ==
- R. Dias; Robbins, Trevor; Roberts, Angela Charlotte (1996). "Dissociation in prefrontal cortex of affective and attentional shifts". Nature. 380 (6569): 69–72. Bibcode:1996Natur.380...69D. doi:10.1038/380069a0. PMID 8598908. S2CID 4301013. Wikidata Q28275885.
- Owen, Adrian Mark; Roberts, Angela Charlotte; John R. Hodges; Robbins, Trevor (1993). "Contrasting mechanisms of impaired attentional set-shifting in patients with frontal lobe damage or Parkinson's disease". Brain. 116 ( Pt 5): 1159–1175. doi:10.1093/brain/116.5.1159. PMID 8221053. Wikidata Q52222727.
- Owen, Adrian Mark; Roberts, Angela Charlotte; Charles E. Polkey; Sahakian, Barbara; Robbins, Trevor (1991). "Extra-dimensional versus intra-dimensional set shifting performance following frontal lobe excisions, temporal lobe excisions or amygdalo-hippocampectomy in man". Neuropsychologia. 29 (10): 993–1006. doi:10.1016/0028-3932(91)90063-e. PMID 1762678. S2CID 43802468. Wikidata Q34649595.
