= Cambridge Neuropsychological Test Automated Battery =

Group of 25 tests to assess cognitive function

- Purpose: cognitive assessment

The Cambridge Neuropsychological Test Automated Battery (CANTAB), originally developed at the University of Cambridge in the 1980s but now provided in a commercial capacity by Cambridge Cognition, is a computer-based cognitive assessment system consisting of a battery of neuropsychological tests, administered to subjects using a touch screen computer. The CANTAB tests were co-invented by Professor Trevor Robbins and Professor Barbara Sahakian. The 25 tests in CANTAB examine various areas of cognitive function, including:

- general memory and learning,
- working memory and executive function,
- visual memory,
- attention and reaction time (RT),
- semantic/verbal memory,
- decision making and response control.

The CANTAB combines the accuracy and rigour of computerised psychological testing whilst retaining the wide range of ability measures demanded of a neuropsychological battery. It is suitable for young and old subjects, and aims to be culture and language independent through the use of non-verbal stimuli in the majority of the tests.

The CANTAB PAL touchscreen test, which assesses visual memory and new learning, was included in a REF submission at the University of Cambridge. This submission (which included research from across the university unrelated to CANTAB PAL) received a 4* grade from the Research Excellence Framework (REF) 2014. CANTAB and CANTAB PAL were highlighted in the Medical Schools Council ‘Health of the Nation’ 2015 publication.

== See also ==
- Cognitive test
- Computer-based assessment
