= Peterson Academy =

American online education platform

- Abbreviation: PA
- Formation: 2024
- Founders: Jordan Peterson; Mikhaila Fuller
- Type: Educational, for-profit
- CEO: Mikhaila Fuller
- Students: 41,000
- Website: petersonacademy.com

Peterson Academy (PA) is an American online educational streaming service launched in 2024. It offers pre-recorded videos taught by college-level instructors and computer-generated, computer-graded quizzes and exercises. It positions itself as offering an alternative to accredited college-level classical liberal education programs at a much lower cost because it does not offer interaction with the instructor, long-form writing projects, or collaborative interaction among students. Peterson Academy credits are not accepted by academic institutions as transferable college or university credit. It was founded by Canadian psychologist Jordan Peterson and his daughter, Mikhaila Peterson, who is CEO.

Peterson Academy has operated in public beta phase since its launch and remains so as of March 2026, with many features still in development. The academy stated that it would progressively release a full catalog of courses within 18 months of launch. Initially, it offered 18 eight-hour courses, expanding to 42 after six months of operation. The organization has expressed its intention to foster rich peer-to-peer connections in the future and learning among students through its own social media platform. It has also announced plans in the future to issue certificates of completion for students who pass tests, with many such assessment components still awaiting rollout.

As of March 2026, Peterson Academy reported having 50,000 students.

== Background and establishment ==
=== Original impetus, vision, founding ===
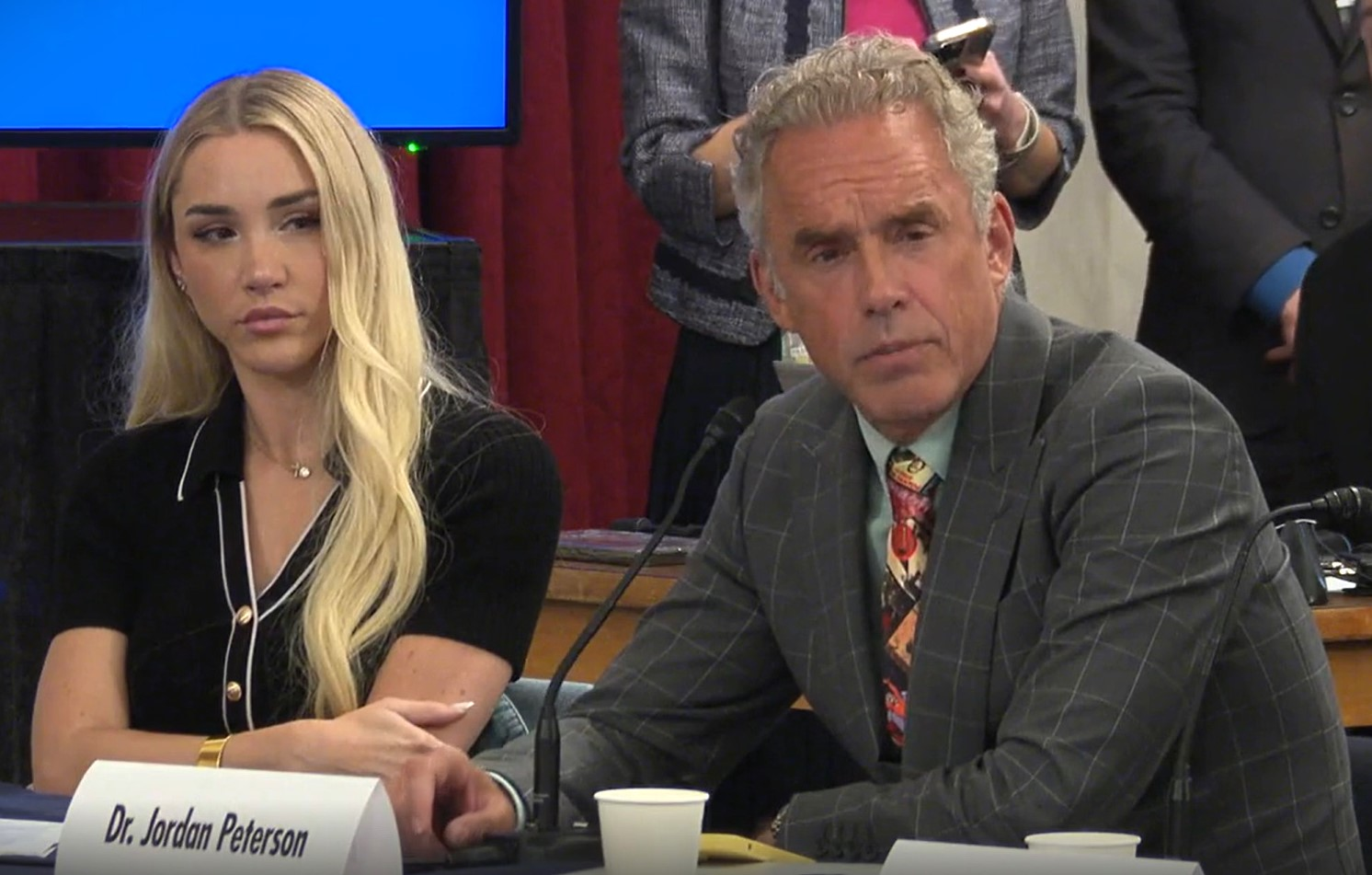
Mikhaila Peterson Fuller and Jordan Peterson in 2024

Peterson Academy was founded by psychologist Jordan Peterson and his daughter Mikhaila Fuller, with the latter becoming the CEO. They announced its creation in 2023, and initially invested 3 million US dollars into the venture.

Jordan Peterson is a conservative Canadian clinical psychologist, a former assistant professor at Harvard University and a professor emeritus at the University of Toronto. He gained international prominence in the late 2010s through his critiques of political correctness, identity politics, and compelled speech. He was initially known in academic circles for his work on personality and belief systems. He later gained wider recognition after publicly opposing aspects of Canadian legislation related to gender identity, which he argued undermined free speech and free thought. In interviews and writings Peterson presents a worldview that emphasizes a distrust of traditional educational institutions and academic experts. Instead, he emphasizes individual accomplishment, conservative values, and the psychological significance of myth and order. His ideas have sparked controversy in public discourse and some of his positions are considered extreme. For example, he has argued that aversion to violence is ineffectual and not virtuous but is instead a form of weakness. Peterson has written that true virtue comes from having the capacity for danger and use of force and then deciding whether or not to carry it out. Peterson had previously launched several other online ventures, and subscription-based educational programs including the Self Authoring Suite (a guided writing and goal-setting program), and Thinkspot (a subscription-based social media platform for long-form content).

Peterson saw traditional universities, particularly Ivy League institutions, as "succumbing to far-left ideology," and ultimately "not being salvageable." As a consequence of these concerns, he sought to create a new approach that would rely heavily on online learning and computers and offer an alternative educational environment for students. He launched Peterson Academy as an online platform that, while not an accredited academic program, is described by Peterson as fulfilling the role of one—providing what he calls a “true education“ free from liberal political agendas and taught by "the best university professors in the world." The goal was to deliver a bachelor’s-level equivalent education, exposing students to major ideas and debates outside what Peterson characterized as the restrictive climate of contemporary academia.

A few months prior to opening for enrollment, an early version of the website described the project as "an online universal education platform devoid of ideology. It hosts the world’s best lecturers, incorporates social interaction, and provides testing. Peterson Academy is drastically reducing the cost of a bachelor’s degree and focuses on teaching students how to think, not what to think." Critics have pointed out that the low cost is reflective of how little human interaction there is both online and in person, the lack of services and facilities normally associated with university-level education, and lack of peer review models. They have also noted that the low cost is reflective of the fact that colleges and universities do not accept transfer credits or recognize the certificates awarded by Peterson Academy.

=== Launch and beta phase ===
The academy opened pre-enrollment in August 2024 and officially launched in September of the same year. Within a month, it reported 30,000 registered students.

The platform was introduced as a public beta version, with a limited number of courses and features available at launch. Announced features still in development during this period included assessment tools such as essay-writing components, assignments, and timed final exams; social media tools like direct messaging and study groups; and other features like a mobile app, note-taking, and certification upon completion of courses. As of April 2025, registration was still offered under the public beta version.

At the time of launch, the academy was aiming to offer a full syllabus of courses within 18 months.

=== Accreditation ===
At launch, Peterson Academy is not an accredited educational institution, and it is unlikely that it will attain accreditation in the foreseeable future.

The academy stated that accreditation was not a priority, though it was being explored in some jurisdictions. It cited concerns that traditional standards prioritized outdated metrics like class hours over educational quality. It also emphasized that the platform was intended for individuals seeking personal development rather than formal credentials, and questioned the relevance of traditional degrees compared to education aimed at genuine intellectual growth.

The academy has also proposed a direct-to-employer model, in which companies may recognize Peterson Academy coursework as legitimate education. Jordan Peterson expressed confidence that some employers would value students who attain the academy’s certification, stating, "[As an employer] if you have any sense you'll employ [PA students] preferentially, because we did the rigorous screening work." He added, "A degree from our university will signify high level of conscientiousness and general cognitive ability... so I think we skip the accreditation process and go right to the employers."

== Academics ==
=== Courses and instructors ===
Peterson Academy’s course offerings draw from the tradition of classical liberal education, encompassing disciplines such as science, finance, psychology, health, politics, and the humanities. The academy describes its curriculum as intellectually rigorous and rooted in major works and ideas, aiming to foster critical thinking and broad cultural literacy.

At launch, the course catalog included offerings in neuroscience, nutrition, leadership, philosophy, and theology. Early titles included Introduction to Neuroscience by Baland Jalal, Introduction to Nutrition by Max Lugavere, The Greatest Leaders in History by Andrew Roberts, Deconstructing Decolonization by Nigel Biggar, Plato: The Dawn of Thought by James Orr, and Political Ideologies by Eric Kaufmann. Jordan Peterson contributed several courses himself, including Intro to Nietzsche, as well as lecture series on Friedrich Nietzsche’s Beyond Good and Evil and the biblical Sermon on the Mount. Philosopher Stephen Hicks offered two courses at launch, with three additional courses in preparation.

Before launch Peterson Academy announced that it had enlisted 30 instructors. It began with 18 courses and initially committed to releasing three new courses per month, later increasing that target to four. By early 2025, the catalog had grown to 42 courses. Instructors included professors affiliated with Cambridge, Oxford, Harvard, MIT, University of Buckingham, and University of Toronto.

=== Methodology and course delivery ===
Courses at Peterson Academy consist of pre-recorded lectures that are self-paced, with each course typically totaling eight hours. According to the academy’s CEO, the combination of high production quality and experienced instructors allows students to gain as much in an 8-hour PA course as they might in the "average semester-length course in the average college from the average professor.” During the beta phase courses include optional AI-generated quizzes to test comprehension.

While the platform aims to expose students to significant ideas through accessible content, some observers have pointed out that it lacks some hallmarks of conventional academic programs, including required readings and assignments, live class discussions, and office hours.

The courses are either filmed in front of a live audience at the academy’s studio in Miami, Florida, or in the home country of the lecturers.

=== Certification and assessment ===
PA, while unaccredited, plans to issue completion certificates. It said it wants to make those valuable by leaning in on three factors: high quality lectures, a student community committed to learning, and a rigorous testing framework.

Early in the beta phase, the only assessment tools were some simple AI-quizzes. The academy has announced plans to establish a more robust assessment framework that will include essays, exams, and other components. Undertaking the tests and the pursuit of a certificate will be optional.

=== Student interaction and community tools ===
The PA courses involve no direct contact between students and professors. However, it announced plans to offer social media tools aimed to enrich the peer-to-peer learning among students.

The academy said it wants to enable students to connect with other young people who are ambitious, forward-looking, and eager to be educated. To accomplish that, it was building a social media network taking the "best features of the social media networks that currently exist." At launch and during the beta phase, the social media platform was still under development, with a Facebook-like wall as the only available feature. Announced features include direct messaging, study groups, a mobile app, and notifications.

== Enrollment and participation ==
PA has an open enrollment model (it is non-selective), where there is no application process, as admission and enrollment are automatic upon registering and paying the subscription fee. It is available worldwide, with the aspiration of translating the courses into other languages in the future.

The code of conduct establishes "a high standard of behavior," with the possibility of expulsion. It requires professors, staff, and students to "conduct themselves in a manner that produces a positive, upward-spiraling, productive reciprocity." The stated goal is to foster an environment most conducive to students who are genuinely committed to learning. The code places particular emphasis on civility combined with freedom of thought, affirming that "the exchange of reasoned opinions and outright disagreement is not only fine (...), but welcome and appropriate." Students who cause disruption or demonstrate a lack of seriousness about their studies may be expelled. On 8 January 2025 the academy permanently removed several paying students—without prior warning and before the code of conduct was implemented—after they criticized a proposed subscription-fee increase on the platform’s social feed. Those expelled said they were automatically refunded but lost access to their coursework and community contacts.

Peterson Academy stated that it aimed to reduce the cost of a bachelor’s degree–equivalent education by approximately 95%, offering a low-cost alternative to traditional universities. One year of enrollment costs $599. Jordan Peterson argued that charging a "modest" fee, rather than offering the program for free, would promote a high-quality student body through the self-selection of motivated and serious learners.

One month after launching the public beta, the organization reported 30,000 registered students. As of April 2025, it reports 41,000.

== Ethos and mission ==
Peterson Academy presents itself as modeling the ideals of classical liberal education, aiming to cultivate critical thinking, intellectual growth, and sophistication through engagement with major thinkers and ideas. Jordan Peterson has described the academy as pursuing the university ideal—a place where students become more verbally fluent, knowledgeable, and less naive. Central to its approach is the emphasis on teaching “how to think, not what to think,” within an intellectually rigorous environment described as “devoid of ideology,” where students are free to form independent views. (Note: In a YouTube video where Jordan Peterson announced Peterson Academy, he elaborated on his thinking for why students should take the kind of education he was endeavoring to offer: "So that's why you think; you think so that your stupid thoughts can die instead of you. If you get to the upper echelons of any hierarchy you will start encountering people who know a lot about almost everything (...) [So] you need to be enculturated, so that you can play with sophisticated people and so you can play a sophisticated and productive game. But also so you can inform yourself with the greatest ideas from history so that whatever problem you are tackling you are gonna have tools to tackle it with.")

Affordability is another core principle. The academy seeks to make higher education financially accessible by significantly lowering costs, while providing lectures by "the world’s best lecturers."

== Reception and commentary ==
Peterson Academy has been compared to a number of other educational platforms that offer an ideological alternative to traditional universities. These include PragerU, the not-for-credit courses offered by Hillsdale College, and the University of Austin. All of these describe themselves as either providing an intellectually open education without enforcing a particular ideological stance, or an education free from the dominant progressive ideologies in academia. Additionally, it has been likened to commercial offerings such as MasterClass and BBC Maestro, which focus on high-production-value instructional videos by well-known figures.

The platform's online model has also been noted as a limitation compared to traditional in-person education. While Peterson Academy aims to offer robust student interaction through its planned social media features, it does not include real-time engagement with instructors, as all lectures are prerecorded. Observers have said that this may make it less suitable for students who value interactive learning environments or personalized feedback.

Some commentators have scrutinized Peterson Academy’s claim of ideological neutrality, noting that early course offerings appeared to reflect Jordan Peterson’s worldview, pointing for example to a course that offered a critique of the orthodoxy of decolonization, a course on the societal challenges faced by men, or a nutrition course by an author who opposes veganism. Others noted that the academy's success in maintaining ideological neutrality remained to be seen, depending on its long-term hiring practices and whether instructors presented a balanced range of views rather than advancing their own agendas, while understanding that humanities courses are especially dependent on the unique interpretive approach of each instructor, with no one single "correct" approach.

During the beta period, journalists reported several shortcomings. Some courses lacked syllabi or reading lists, and there was an absence of office hours, assignments, or comprehensive testing. While the platform included optional quizzes, the early experience was characterized as significantly different from that of mainstream higher education. That said, the academy has indicated that it is actively developing a more rigorous assessment framework, including essays and final exams. Also during the beta phase, the catalog was largely limited to interpretive and humanities-oriented subjects, with no offerings in more technical areas such as computer science, chemistry, mathematics, or physics, with one observer calling it an "oddly pinched and narrow" curriculum.

Journalists highlighted examples of expulsions as a test of the academy’s professed free-speech ethos. The Toronto Star described the bans as ironic in light of Peterson’s public defense of free speech, while expelled students interviewed on the Jeffrey van Leeuwen Podcast said the expulsion had a chilling effect on remaining students.
