= Mikhaila Peterson =

Canadian businesswoman

Mikhaila Fuller
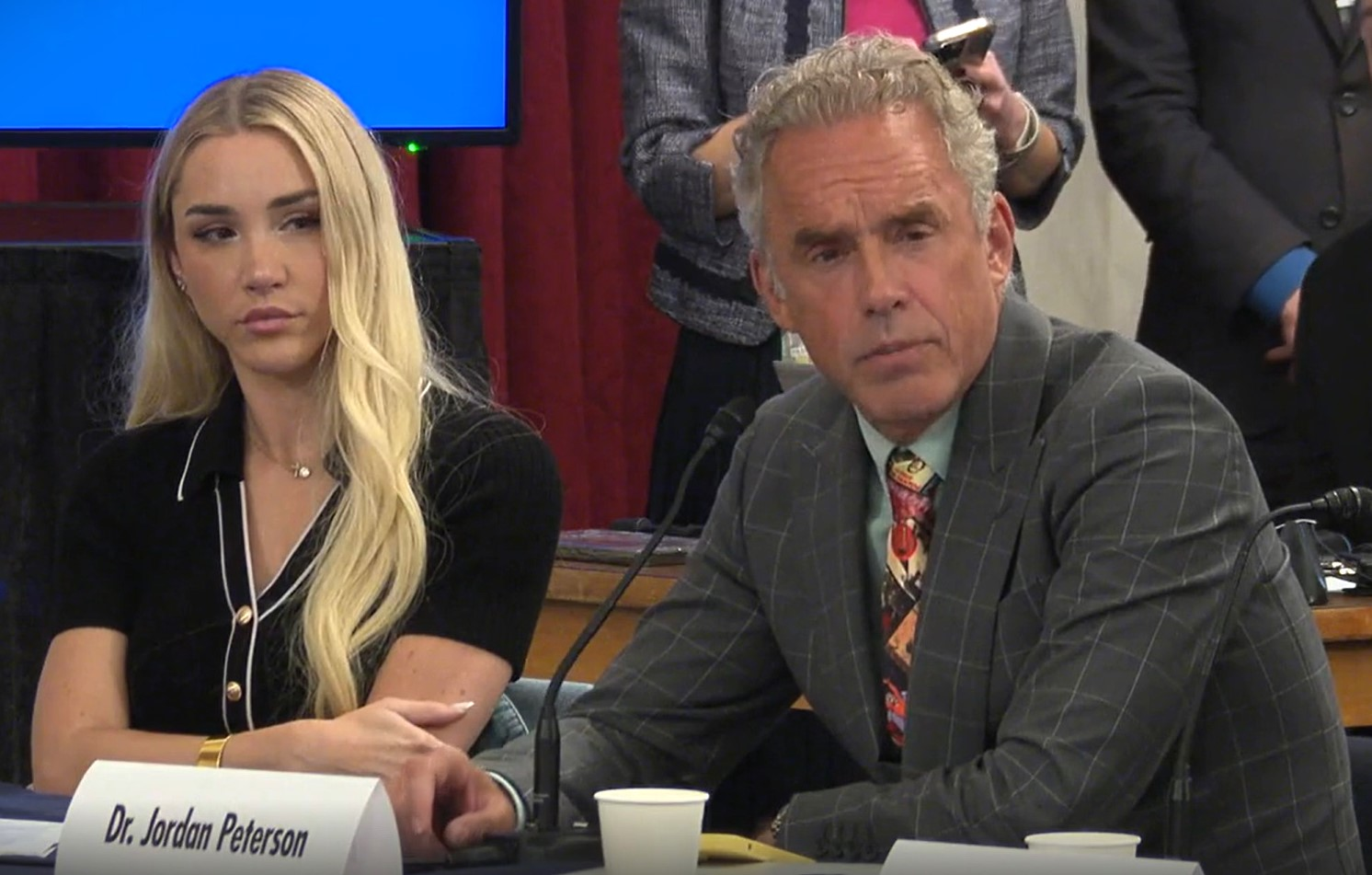
- Mikhaila Peterson (left) pictured with father Jordan Peterson
- Born: Mikhaila Peterson; January 4, 1992 (age 34); Toronto, Canada
- Education: Ryerson University (BA)
- Occupations: Podcaster; entrepreneur
- Spouse: Jordan M. Fuller
- Children: 4
- Father: Jordan B. Peterson

YouTube information
- Channel: Mikhaila Peterson
- Years active: 2020–present
- Genre: Podcast
- Subscribers: 1.38 million
- Views: 386.5 million
- Last updated: September 12, 2026
- Website: mikhailapeterson.com

Mikhaila Peterson (born 1992) is a Canadian businesswoman and podcaster, and the daughter of author Jordan Peterson. She is the CEO of Peterson Academy and the host of an eponymous podcast on YouTube, The Mikhaila Peterson Podcast.

== Early life ==
Born in Toronto, Canada, Mikhaila Peterson is the daughter of Jordan Peterson and Tammy Peterson. Peterson was diagnosed with arthritis since age two, and experienced nightmares and clinical depression during her adolescent years. Aged 17, Peterson required a hip replacement and an ankle replacement. These were caused by bone erosion from the earlier arthritis diagnosis. She also experienced celiac disease. Growing up agnostic, Peterson underwent a conversion to Christianity after her mother received a diagnosis of cancer. After completing high school, Peterson studied psychology in Montreal, Canada, at Concordia University, moving on to George Brown College and finally graduating with a Bachelor of Arts in biological and biomedical sciences from Ryerson University.

== Career ==
In 2018, Peterson began a carnivore diet and maintained an Instagram account with the caption "Beef, salt, water and bourbon = cured." She also published an online blog at this time called "Don't Eat That." An adaptation of the carnivore diet, titled the "lion diet," which is considered the most restrictive version, is discussed on Don't Eat That. Peterson followed this diet, restricting her own intake to just meat. Her health improved as a result. According to The Guardian newspaper, Peterson briefly offered private consultations, though her health information is free on her website liondiet.com. After appearing on The Joe Rogan Experience podcast, the blog was criticized for "promulgating quackery" and that its advice should be taken with a "pinch of salt."

Moving to Miami and then Arizona, Peterson started a podcast, named after herself, focused on health and science. The podcast quickly picked up sponsors from Ancestral Supplements and Brooklyn Biltong. In 2023 after being diagnosed with CIRS, Peterson set up a website called biotoxin.com, which compiled papers on mold, attributing it to pre-existing medical conditions. After appearing on Piers Morgan Uncensored, Peterson planned to launch a health supplement brand named Fuller Health. Peterson was appointed the CEO of Peterson Academy, founded by her and her father, in 2023.

== Personal life ==
Peterson is married to partner Jordan Fuller, and has four children.
