= Leslie Iversen =

British pharmacologist (1937–2020)

Leslie Iversen CBE FRS MAE
- Born: Leslie Lars Iversen; 31 October 1937; Exeter, England
- Died: 30 July 2020 (aged 82)
- Citizenship: United Kingdom
- Spouse: Susan Iversen (m. 1961)
- Awards: Ferrier Lecture
- Scientific career
- Fields: Pharmacology
- Institutions: University of Oxford; University of Cambridge

Leslie Lars Iversen CBE FRS MAE (31 October 1937 – 30 July 2020), was a British pharmacologist, known for his work on the neurochemistry of neurotransmission.

== Early life ==
Of Norwegian descent, Iversen attended Hele's School, Exeter, and Trinity College, Cambridge, where he graduated with a BA in natural sciences and a PhD in pharmacology.

== Career and research ==
A Fellow of Trinity College from 1964 to 1984, Iversen was also Locke Research Fellow of the Royal Society at the University of Cambridge from 1967 to 1971. From 1971 to 1982, he was Director of the MRC Neurochemical Pharmacology Unit in Cambridge. Between 1982 and 1995 he worked as Director of the Merck, Sharp & Dohme Neuroscience Research Centre. In 1995 he became visiting professor of pharmacology at the University of Oxford.

In 2000, Iversen published the book The Science of Marijuana by Oxford University Press, Inc. In 2010 he was accused of plagiarism. Consequently, one of his books now credits the original author of the plagiarized work.

=== Awards and honours ===
He was elected a Fellow of the Royal Society (FRS) in 1980 and gave the Society's Ferrier Lecture in 1983. He was appointed a Commander of the Order of the British Empire (CBE) in the 2013 New Year Honours, "for services to pharmacology".

He died on 30 July 2020, survived by his wife of nearly 60 years, Susan Iversen.
