= Current Opinion in Behavioral Sciences =

- Discipline: Behavioral sciences
- Language: English
- Edited by: Cindy Lustig, Trevor Robbins

Publication details
- History: 2015-present
- Publisher: Elsevier
- Frequency: Bimonthly
- Impact factor: 5.0 (2022)

Standard abbreviations
- ISO 4: Curr. Opin. Behav. Sci.

Indexing
- ISSN: 2352-1546 (print); 2352-1554 (web)
- OCLC no.: 910107913

Links
- Journal homepage; Online archive

Current Opinion in Behavioral Sciences is a bimonthly peer-reviewed academic journal covering all aspects of the behavioral sciences. It was established in 2015 and is published by Elsevier as part of their Current Opinion series of journals. The editors-in-chief are Cindy Lustig (University of Michigan) and Trevor Robbins (University of Cambridge). Each issue covers a specific theme and is edited by one or more guest editors.

== Abstracting and indexing ==
The journal is abstracted and indexed in Current Contents/Life Sciences, Current Contents/Social & Behavioral Sciences, Embase, PsycINFO, Science Citation Index Expanded, Scopus, and the Social Sciences Citation Index. According to the Journal Citation Reports, the journal has a 2022 impact factor of 5.0.
