= Susan Iversen =

British experimental psychologist (1940–2025)

Susan Iversen CBE FMedSci
- in 1970s
- Born: Susan Diana Kibble; 28 February 1940; Aylesbury, Buckinghamshire, England
- Died: 29 January 2025 (aged 84)
- Education: Girton College, Cambridge (BA, PhD)
- Spouse: Leslie Iversen (m. 1961; died 2020)
- Children: 3
- Scientific career
- Workplaces: National Institutes of Health; Harvard University; Girton College, Cambridge; Jesus College, Cambridge; Magdalen College, Oxford
- Doctoral students: Heather Berlin; Trevor Robbins

Susan Diana Iversen (née Kibble; 28 February 1940 – 29 January 2025) was a British experimental psychologist. She was a former professor of psychology at the University of Oxford.

== Early life and education ==
Iversen was born in Aylesbury, Buckinghamshire, England on 28 February 1940, and grew up in Princes Risborough. She completed her secondary education at Wycombe High School, where an inspirational teacher, Miss Maude, encouraged her to apply to study at the University of Cambridge.

She attended Girton College, Cambridge. At Cambridge she did a BA in Zoology followed by a PhD in Experimental Psychology, focusing on neuropsychology in non-human primates. Her doctoral supervisor was Lawrence Weiskrantz.

== Career and research ==
After earning her PhD, Iversen held postdoctoral positions in the United States at the National Institutes of Health (where she worked with Mortimer Mishkin) and Harvard University. Returning to the UK, Iversen was a fellow of Girton College, Cambridge, from 1966 to 1975. From 1981 to 1993 she was a fellow of Jesus College, Cambridge. She served as president from 1984 to 1986 of the British Association for Psychopharmacology, which publishes the Journal of Psychopharmacology, and the Experimental Psychology Society from 1988 to 1990.

She was a fellow of Magdalen College, Oxford, from 1993 to 2005, and also professor of psychology. She served as head of the department of Experimental Psychology from 1993 to 2000.

Iversen took on a variety of administrative positions during her time at Oxford. In 1998 she was appointed pro-vice-chancellor for research, and her tenure saw the opening of the Oxford Centre for Functional Magnetic Resonance Imaging of the Brain (FMRIB), now the Wellcome Centre for Integrative Neuroimaging. Irene Tracey, the university's current Vice-Chancellor, co-founded and later directed the centre. From 2000 until her retirement in 2005 she served as pro-vice-chancellor for planning and resource allocation. After retiring she became the inaugural director of the interdisciplinary James Martin 21st Century School from 2005 to 2006 and the interim director of the Oxford University Museum of Natural History from 2010 to 2011.

=== Awards and honours ===
Iversen was elected a Fellow of the Academy of Medical Sciences (FMedSci) in 1999. She served as editor of Neuropsychologia from 1997 to 2000. She was appointed a Commander of the Order of the British Empire (CBE) in the 2005 New Year Honours. The British Association of Pharmacology awarded Iversen their life achievement award in 2003.

On 27 September 2023, the Iversen Building in the Oxford Science Park, named after Susan Iversen, was opened by Magdalen College president Dinah Rose and university vice-chancellor Irene Tracey. It is the first building in the park named after a woman scientist.

== Personal life and death ==
Susan Iversen was married to Leslie Iversen, whom she met as an undergraduate at Cambridge, from 1961 until his death in 2020. They had three children together and seven grandchildren. She died on 29 January 2025, at the age of 85.
