= Barbara Sahakian =

Neuropsychologist

Barbara Jacquelyn Sahakian CBE, FBA, FMedSci
- Spouse: Trevor Robbins
- Awards: Fellow of the Academy of Medical Sciences (2004); F C Donders Chair of Psychopharmacology (2005); Alfred Deakin Innovation Lecture (2008); University of Pennsylvania Distinguished International Scholar Award (2009); ICGP Senior Investigator Award (2010); Doctor of Science (2015); Fellow of the British Academy (2017)
- Scientific career
- Workplaces: University of Cambridge; Clare Hall, Cambridge
- Barbara Sahakian's voice from the BBC programme The Life Scientific, 29 May 2012.

Barbara Jacquelyn Sahakian is an English neuroscientist who is professor of clinical neuropsychology at the department of psychiatry and Medical Research Council (MRC)/Wellcome Trust Behavioural and Clinical Neuroscience Institute, University of Cambridge. She is also an honorary clinical psychologist at Addenbrooke's Hospital, Cambridge. She has an international reputation in the fields of cognitive psychopharmacology, neuroethics, neuropsychology, neuropsychiatry and neuroimaging. She was appointed a Commander of the Order of the British Empire in the 2024 Birthday Honours.

Sahakian is a fellow of Clare Hall, Cambridge. She is currently president of the International Neuroethics Society (INS), of which she is a founder member. She is past president of the British Association for Psychopharmacology (BAP), having served as president from 2012 to 2014.

== Education ==
Sahakian completed her PhD in psychopharmacology at Darwin College, Cambridge in the department of psychology at the University of Cambridge. Following this, Sahakian studied for a Diploma in Clinical Psychology and became a Chartered Psychologist.

== Career ==
Sahakian is best known for her work on cognitive enhancement using pharmacological treatments, early detection of Alzheimer's disease, cognition and depression and neuroethics. Sahakian's research is aimed at understanding the neural basis of cognitive, emotional and behavioural dysfunction to develop more effective pharmacological and psychological treatments. The focus of her lab is on early detection of neuropsychiatric disorders, differential diagnosis and proof of concept studies using cognitive enhancing drugs and cognitive training.

In her research, Sahakian uses techniques such as psychopharmacological, neuropsychological and neuroimaging (fMRI and PET). Key research areas for her group are Alzheimer's disease, Attention Deficit Hyperactivity Disorder (ADHD), Obsessive Compulsive Disorder (OCD), substance abuse, depression and mania.

In 2007, Sahakian raised concerns regarding the ethics of using drugs intended to help dementia and Alzheimer's patients to instead enhance cognitive function in healthy people. In May 2014, Sahakian published an article on the subject of achieving brain health for a flourishing society within the next decade. In this article, she included a list of experts from a range of areas, including neuroscience, innovation and technology. Sahakian was asked to write this article for Sir John Beddington, Chief Scientific Adviser to the UK Government.

Sahakian has published over 400 papers covering these topics in scientific journals, including many publications in the prestigious scientific and medical journals Science, Nature, Nature Neuroscience, The Lancet, and the British Medical Journal. She is an associate editor of Psychological Medicine. The ISI Web of Science database credits her with a Hirsch (h) Index of 100.

Sahakian is co-author of 'Bad Moves. How decision making goes wrong and the ethics of smart drugs', published by Oxford University Press in 2013. She is also co-editor of 'The Oxford Handbook of Neuroethics', published in 2011 by Oxford University Press.

In addition to her Presidencies of the BAP and INS, Sahakian is also on the council of the International College of Neuropsychopharmacology (CINP) and on the European College of Neuropsychopharmacology (ECNP) Review Board. She is also a London Imperial Affiliated Professor and a Distinguished Research fellow at the Oxford Uehiro Centre for Practical Ethics. Previously, Sahakian has been a member of the MRC Neurosciences and Mental Health Board (2006–2010) and a member of the Society for Neuroscience (SfN) Committee on Women in Neuroscience. Recently, a Royal Institution article named Barbara Sahakian amongst the top women in science.

== Inventions ==
Sahakian's research uses neuropsychological tests, such as the Cambridge Neuropsychological Test Automated Battery (CANTAB) tests, which she co-invented in the 1980s. CANTAB is now used at over 700 research institutes worldwide and is backed by over 1,200 peer-review articles. Sahakian serves as a Senior Consultant to Cambridge Cognition, a spin-out of the University of Cambridge. Cambridge Cognition now provides CANTAB.

The CANTAB PAL touchscreen test, which assesses visual memory and new learning, received the highest rating of world-leading 4* grade from the Research Excellence Framework (REF) 2014. Following this award, CANTAB and CANTAB PAL were highlighted in the Medical Schools Council 'Health of the Nation' 2015 publication, which described CANTAB as a boost to the UK economy.

== Neuroscience and mental health policy ==
Sahakian is a lead on many high-impact international neuroscience and mental health policy reports, including the National Institute of Mental Health (NIMH) funded report on Grand Challenges in Global Mental Health and the UK Government Foresight Project on Mental Capital and Wellbeing in 2008. The latter project emphasised good brain health and wellbeing throughout the life course and highlighted important concepts, such as cognitive reserve and resilience to stress.

Sahakian recently presented on neuroscience and mental health policy at the World Economic Forum (WEF) 2014 in Davos, Switzerland. She is a Member of the WEF Global Agenda Council on Brain Research.

== Press ==
Sahakian frequently engages the public in science, appearing on programmes such as BBC Newsnight, and on both The Life Scientific and the Today Programme on BBC Radio 4. She has also taken part in numerous newspaper interviews, such as The Sunday Times and Forbes Online. In 2012, Sahakian contributed to the catalogue and appeared in a video for the Wellcome Trust Superhuman Exhibition. In May 2014, she took part in a Reddit Ask Me Anything (AMA), fielding questions on a range of subjects, such as depression and cognitive enhancing drugs. In July 2014, Sahakian dispelled the myth that humans only use 10% of their brains in regard to the plot of the film Lucy. In March 2015, she advised on the 'You have been upgraded' event at the Science Museum in London, which featured demonstrations by members of her Laboratory. In the context of presentations on neuroscience, brain health, cognitive enhancement and neuropsychiatric disorders, she has frequently stated the importance of understanding brain health and disease.

== Honours and awards ==
Since 2004, Sahakian has been a Fellow of the Academy of Medical Sciences. She is also associated with the Human Brain Project. Sahakian is also a Member of the International Expert Jury for the 2017 Else Kröner-Fresenius-Stiftung Prize.

Sahakian was he was appointed to the F C Donders Chair of Psychopharmacology at the University of Utrecht in 2005 and the Distinguished International Scholar Award at the University of Pennsylvania in 2009. In 2010, she received the International College of Geriatric Psychoneuropharmacology (ICGP) Senior Investigator Award. In 2008, Sahakian gave the Alfred Deakin Innovation Lecture in Melbourne, Australia.

In 2015, Sahakian was awarded a Doctor of Science degree from the University of Cambridge, which is the highest degree awarded by the university for distinguished research in science.

In July 2017, Sahakian was elected a Fellow of the British Academy (FBA), the United Kingdom's national academy for the humanities and social sciences.

== Selected publications ==
- Mental Capital and Wellbeing (2009)
- Oxford Handbook of Neuroethics (2011)
- Bad Moves: How Decision Making Goes Wrong, and the Ethics of Smart Drugs (2013)
- Sex, Lies, and Brain Scans: How FMRI Reveals what Really Goes on in Our Minds (2016)
- Translational Neuropsychopharmacology (2016)
- Adam R Aron; Fletcher, Paul; Bullmore, Edward Thomas; Sahakian, Barbara; Robbins, Trevor (2003). "Stop-signal inhibition disrupted by damage to right inferior frontal gyrus in humans". Nature Neuroscience. 6 (2): 115–116. doi:10.1038/nn1003. PMID 12536210. Wikidata Q34171615.
- Collins, Pamela Y.; Patel, Vikram; Joestl, Sarah S.; et al. (2011). "Grand challenges in global mental health". Nature. 475 (7354): 27–30. doi:10.1038/475027a. PMC 3173804. PMID 21734685. Wikidata Q22251122.
- R D Rogers; Everitt, Barry J.; Alex Baldacchino; et al. (1999). "Dissociable deficits in the decision-making cognition of chronic amphetamine abusers, opiate abusers, patients with focal damage to prefrontal cortex, and tryptophan-depleted normal volunteers: evidence for monoaminergic mechanisms". Neuropsychopharmacology. 20 (4): 322–339. doi:10.1016/s0893-133x(98)00091-8. PMID 10088133. Wikidata Q28372016.
