= Trevor Robbins =

British academic

Trevor William Robbins CBE FRS FMedSci
- Trevor W. Robbins, 2022
- Born: 26 November 1949 (age 76)
- Education: Jesus College, Cambridge, UK
- Spouse: Prof. Barbara Sahakian
- Awards: Grete Lundbeck European Brain Research Prize (2014)
- Scientific career
- Workplaces: University of Cambridge, Cambridge, UK
- Thesis: An analysis of the behavioural effects of d-amphetamine (1975)
- Doctoral advisor: Prof. Susan Iversen

Trevor William Robbins, PhD, CBE, FRS, FMedSci is a British, Cambridge-based neuroscientist and psychologist, a Brain Prize winner, who works at the interface of cognitive neuroscience, behavioural neuroscience and psychopharmacology, with application to mental health disorders.

Robbins is a Professor of Cognitive Neuroscience and former Head of Psychology at the University of Cambridge. He is also Director of Research at the Behavioural and Clinical Neuroscience Institute (BCNI) He is an Emeritus Fellow of Downing College, Cambridge, and Past-President of the British Neuroscience Association (BNA), the British Association for Psychopharmacology (BAP) and the European Behavioural Pharmacology Society (EBPS).

== Early life and education ==
Robbins was born in Dulwich, London and attended Battersea Grammar School.

He lived in a South London area close to the location where dopamine was first synthesized, an interesting coincidence given that he became a prominent dopamine and addiction researcher.

Robbins was a keen chess player from an early age and represented both England Juniors in 1967 and the University of Cambridge as an undergraduate. He was once ranked in the top twenty players in England and had one of his wins from a Varsity match in 1970 featured as a classic game in The Sunday Times. Robbins obtained his Bachelor of Arts and subsequent Master of Arts degrees from Cambridge University, (Jesus College), with First Class Honours in the Natural Science Tripos in 1971. He majored in Psychology and also completed courses in Biochemistry and other aspects of Biology.

He then received a PhD degree from the University of Cambridge in 1975 for an analysis of the behavioural effects of Dextroamphetamine His doctoral supervisor was Susan Iversen. Robbins praised Prof. Iversen’s influence on him in developing a pioneering synthesis of neuropsychology, psychopharmacology and neurochemistry.

== Career ==
Robbins was appointed as a Demonstrator in the Department of Experimental Psychology at the University of Cambridge in 1973. He was subsequently promoted to Lecturer and Reader, before becoming Professor of Cognitive Neuroscience in 1997.

In October 2002, Robbins was elected to the position of Professor of Experimental Psychology, and therefore the Head (Chair) of the Department, of Psychology, Cambridge University, serving in that role until 2017. This position was established in 1931, and Robbins was the fourth Chair of Psychology following Frederic Bartlett, Oliver Zangwill and Nicholas Mackintosh. During his tenure, he was instrumental in the merger of the Departments of Experimental Psychology and of Social and Developmental Psychology and the introduction of a new 3 year teaching course the "Psychological and Behavioural Sciences Tripos." He also led the Department of Experimental Psychology to the first rank in the U.K. Research Assessment Exercise (REF 2008) for Psychology. Together with the Professor of Neurology Alastair Compston, he led the formation of Cambridge Neuroscience that started in 2007 to enhance collaboration and communication amongst neuroscientists at the university, as well as public outreach.

Currently, Robbins is the Director of the Behavioural and Clinical Neuroscience Institute (BCNI), of Cambridge University, UK. The BCNI is focused on translational work leading to the treatment of neuropsychiatric disorders. The Institute had a major role in the supervision and training of post-graduate students in this area. Robbins has been a supervisor of over 40 PhD students, many of whom have since gained professorial appointments. The work of Robbins and his main collaborators, professors Barbara Sahakian, Barry Everitt, Ed Bullmore, Angela Roberts, Jeff Dalley, James Rowe and several others led to the formation of the BCNI in 2005, which was jointly funded by the Medical Research Council (MRC) and the Wellcome Trust.

Robbins is also an Honorary Professor at Fudan University in the Institute of Brain-Inspired Intelligence, with several recent research collaborations.

The focus of Robbins' work is on the functions of the frontal lobes of the brain especially the so-called 'fronto-striatal’ systems, and their regulation by the chemical neurotransmitter systems in humans and other animals. In particular, he analysed differential functions of forebrain dopamine, noradrenaline, serotonin and acetylcholine in such processes as attention, arousal, activation and motivation and how psychoactive drugs affect these functions. Early work showed that amphetamine potentiated the efficacy of reward-related stimuli to activate behavior via dopamine-dependent mechanisms of the nucleus accumbens (often now called incentive salience). His work is relevant to neuropsychiatric disorders including schizophrenia, depression, drug addiction, obsessive compulsive disorder (OCD), attention deficit hyperactivity disorder (ADHD), as well as Parkinson's and Alzheimer's diseases.

Robbins also employs psychological paradigms for investigating cognitive functions, including planning, decision making, learning, attention and self-control, often combined with brain imaging. His research covers the mechanisms underlying possible cognitive enhancing effects of drugs and understanding the causation and neural basis of drug addiction and impulsive-compulsive behaviour. With Professor Barry Everitt, he has proposed a theory that the compulsive drug seeking behaviour of addiction results from a transition of control from goal-directed to habitual systems in the brain. He has also theorised more recently about the neural basis of compulsive behaviour in OCD and other disorders.

Robbins Chaired the MRC Neuroscience and Mental Health Research Board between 1995 and 1999, and was co-leader of the UK Government 2005 Foresight Project entitled 'Drug Futures 2025?'. He has also consulted for the Prime Minister of the United Kingdom on the state of UK research in addiction.

Since 2005, Robbins has been a Fellow of the Royal Society. In addition, he is a Fellow of the British Psychological Society (since 1990) and the British Pharmacological Society(2017), as well as being a Fellow of the Academy of Medical Sciences (since 2000).

== Works ==
Robbins has co-edited 10 books, including:

1. Psychology for Medicine(1988),. This text book is based on the course developed for Cambridge University medical students.
2. The Prefrontal Cortex: Executive and Cognitive Functions(1998)
3. Disorders of Brain and Mind, Volume 2 (2003)
4. Drugs and the Future; Brain Science, Addiction and Society (2006)
5. The Neurobiology of Addiction(2010).
6. Decision Making, Affect and Learning(2011).
7. Cognitive Search: Evolution, Algorithms, and the Brain (2012)
8. Translational Neuropsychopharmacology(2016)
9. The Neurobiology and Treatment of OCD:Accelerating Progress (2021)
10. The Frontal Cortex: Organization, Networks, and Function (2024)

Robbins has published over 1000 full papers in scientific journals, including Nature Brain, Science and Nature Neuroscience.

He has been a highly cited author in the ISI Web of Science since 1999. Google Scholar credits Robbins with a Hirsch (h) index of 277 listing over 1400 scientific contributions and over 260,000 citations. He is credited by Semantic Scholar as being one of the "most influential neuroscientists in the modern era". According to the indices used by Research.com, he was ranked the 1st in the world in Psychology in 2023, 2025 and 2026, and 3-rd in Neuroscience for the impact of his research publications Robbins has been an editor of the journal Psychopharmacology since 1980, is a member of the Advisory Editorial Board of the journal Science and was Co-Editor-in-Chief of the journal Current Opinion in Behavioral Sciences. In 2017–2018 he was a guest co-editor of a theme issue of the Philosophical Transactions of the Royal Society.

== Inventions ==
Robbins' research uses neuropsychological tests, such as the Cambridge Neuropsychological Test Automated Battery (CANTAB), which he co-invented with Professor Barbara Sahakian in the 1980s.

This battery was one of the first computerized cognitive testing batteries that employed touch-screen technology. CANTAB is now used at over 700 research institutes worldwide and is backed by over 1,200 peer-review articles. Robbins has served as a Consultant to Cambridge Cognition, a spin-out of the University of Cambridge, which now provides CANTAB.

The CANTAB PAL (paired associates learning) touchscreen test, which assesses visual memory and learning, was included in the submission by the University of Cambridge to the Research Excellence Framework (REF 2014). CANTAB and CANTAB PAL were highlighted in the Medical Schools Council 'Health of the Nation' 2015 publication.

Several of the CANTAB tests derived from tasks Robbins co-invented in tests of cognitive function in experimental animals, notably, the 5-choice serial reaction time task, the extra-dimensional attentional set-shifting task and the rodent stop-signal reaction time task.

Robbins is also a co-author of the neurochemical Functional Ensemble of Temperament model that mapped the functional roles of brain neurotransmitters to main aspects of behavioural regulation.

== Press and media ==
Robbins has frequently appeared in press interviews to discuss his research such as The Guardian, BBC News, The Daily Express, The Conversation and The Naked Scientists podcast "Titans of Science". He frequently engages the public in science, such as speaking at the Hay Festival and participating in a feature on smart drugs for BBC Online. He has featured in TV documentaries for BBC Horizon and for Channel 5 on Obsessive-Compulsive Disorder. He lectures widely on how brain regions control behaviour in health and disease including to the Manchester Literary & Philosophical Society where notes of his lecture may be viewed.

== Awards and recognition ==
Robbins's work has been acknowledged by the following honours and awards:

- 1981 – Spearman Medal (British Psychological Society) "for outstanding early career research"
- 2001 – Distinguished Scientist Award (European Behavioural Pharmacology Society)
- 2005 – (co-recipient) The Neuronal Plasticity Prize, which was awarded by the Ipsen Foundation for his work on motivation and the striatum.
- 2011 – (joint) American Psychological Association Award for Distinguished Scientific Contributions for his research in experimental psychology and neuroscience.
- 2011 – (co-recipient) Otto Herbert Wolff Award (University College, London
- 2012 – Appointed Commander of the Order of the British Empire in the 2012 UK New Year Honours for services to medical research.
- 2012 – The Award of the Angharad Dodds John Fellowship in Mental Health and Neuropsychiatry at Downing College, Cambridge.
- 2014 – (along with Professor Stanislas Dehaene and Professor Giacomo Rizzolatti) – The Award of the Grete Lundbeck European Brain Research Prize 2014, also known as The Brain Prize, for Robbins' pioneering research on higher brain mechanisms and his efforts to understand cognitive and behavioural disorders. The award was presented at a Ceremony in Copenhagen, Denmark in May 2014.
- 2015 – Robert Sommer Award for Research into Schizophrenia
- 2015 – British Association for Psychopharmacology - Lifetime Achievement Award
- 2016 – Gold Medal of the Society of Biological Psychiatry (USA)
- 2017 – Patricia Goldman-Rakic Award in Cognitive Neuroscience
- 2018 – Honorary Professor, Fudan University, Shanghai, China
- 2019 – British Psychological Society - Lifetime Achievement Award
- 2022 – Association of Psychological Science - William James Fellow Award
- 2024 – "Trevor Robbins Cognitive Neuroscience Laboratory" opened at the Department of Psychology, University of Cambridge
