= Pamela Y. Collins =

American psychiatrist

Academic background
- Education: B.A. Purdue University; M.D., Cornell University; M.P.H., Columbia University; Pew Nutrition Fellowship, Rockefeller University

Academic work
- Institutions: Columbia University College of Physicians & Surgeons; New York State Psychiatric Institute; Columbia University Mailman School of Public Health; National Institute of Mental Health; University of Washington School of Medicine and University of Washington School of Public Health

Pamela Y. Collins is an American psychiatrist. She is the Director of the International Training and Education Center for Health (I-TECH) and the Global Mental Health Program at the University of Washington School of Medicine and School of Public Health. Collins is professor of psychiatry and behavioral sciences and of global health. She previously worked as the director of the Office for Research on Disparities and Global Mental Health at the National Institute of Mental Health (NIMH).

== Early life and education ==
Collins was born to a Lutheran minister-turned-professor and a speech pathologist. She studied psychology as an undergraduate at Purdue University, completing all prerequisites for medical school, and minoring in French language. Originally intending to pursue doctoral studies in clinical psychology, she instead decided to study medicine with the goal of becoming a psychiatrist and with a strong interest in transcultural psychiatry and global mental health. Her first experience in working outside of the United States occurred during the summer after her first year at Cornell. Collins received funding for summer research placement in Haiti at the Haitian Group for the Study of Kaposi's Sarcoma and Opportunistic Infections

Seeking a more in-depth research experience during medical school, she applied for and received a Pew Fellowship in the laboratory of Jules Hirsch at Rockefeller University, where she studied the effects of estrogen on adipocyte fatty-acid binding protein. Collins earned her medical degree from Cornell University. Following medical school she trained in psychiatry at Columbia-Presbyterian Medical Center and the New York State Psychiatric Institute. During her research fellowship, she completed a master's degree in public health from Columbia University. and flew to Haiti on an AIDS-related project. She completed her psychiatry residency at the New York State Psychiatric Institute and Columbia Presbyterian Hospital and was hired to become a clinical research fellow with the National Institute of Mental Health (NIMH).

== Career ==
At the turn of the 21st century, Collins worked with the NIMH to conduct HIV care and prevention trials. She co-led an HIV in Psychiatric Institutions training project and joined the Mother to Child transmission-Plus project. She also worked as an assistant professor of Clinical Psychiatry at Columbia University's Mailman School of Public Health where she co-founded a six-month practicum in a developing nation. In 2007, she partook in the practicum and travelled to Rwanda in order to educate Rwanda staff on HIV and mental health.

In 2010, the NIMH Office for Special Populations and the Office of Global Mental Health were merged to form the Office for Research on Disparities and Global Mental Health, with Collins as its director. The following year, Collins helped lead the Grand Challenges in Global Mental Health Initiative, which aimed to "identify the most pressing priorities for improving mental health care around the world." Following this initiative, Collins co-edited The Lancet series on Global Mental Health and led the development of the 2013 PLoS Medicine Policy Forum series on global perspectives for integrating mental health. After eight years with the NIMH, Collins was appointed the Director of Global Mental Health at the University of Washington with a joint appointment as a professor in the Departments of Psychiatry and Behavioral Sciences and Global Health.

Collins was elected a member of the National Academy of Medicine in 2025.
