= Joseph Herbert (neuroscientist) =

Joe Herbert (born 8 April 1936) is Emeritus Professor of Neuroscience at the University of Cambridge.

== Education ==
Herbert received a BSc (Hons. Class I) in Anatomical Studies from the University of Birmingham in 1957 followed by a Doctor of Medicine from the University of Birmingham in 1960 and a PhD in neuroendocrinology from the University of London in 1965.

== Career ==
Prior to joining the Department of Anatomy at the University of Cambridge as a lecturer in 1971, Herbert was a lecturer in the Department of Anatomy at the University of Birmingham. There he worked under Solly Zuckerman, Baron Zuckerman, who had supervised his PhD. Herbert has been a fellow at Gonville and Caius College, Cambridge since 1976. He was the Director of Training at the University of Cambridge Centre for Brain Repair (1992-2014) and a past president (1982) of the International Academy of Sex Research. In the course of his career, Herbert has served as the PhD supervisor or Post-doctoral mentor of several distinguished British neuroscientists, including Barry Everitt, Alan Dixson, Angela Roberts, Barry Keverne, Michael Hastings, and David Abbott.

== Research ==
Herbert's work has primarily focused on hormones; The Guardian has called him 'one of the world's leading endocrinologists.' His areas of expertise include the role of hormones in the ability of the adult brain to make new nerve cells (neurons) and repair the brain; how hormones regulate behavior; the neuroscience of stress; how hormones, genes and the social and psychological environment interact to promote the risk for depression; and studies on the way that hormones and genes influence financial decision-making. He has published more than 250 peer-reviewed papers on these topics.

== Writing ==
Herbert has authored two books, The Minder Brain (World Scientific Publishing Co., 2007), and Testosterone: Sex, Power and the Will to Win (Oxford University Press, 2015).

== Bullying allegation ==
In August 2022, the Gonville and Caius Grievance Committee determined accusations that Herbert bullied and harassed a junior female colleague during a dispute over a controversial slavery report were 'well founded'. No disciplinary actions were taken against Herbert and he has refused to apologize.
