= Ed Bullmore =

British Neuropsychiatrist, neuroscientist, and academic

Edward Bullmore FRCP FRCPsych FRS FMedSci
- Born: Edward Thomas Bullmore; 27 September 1960 (age 65)
- Other names: Ed Bullmore; Edward T. Bullmore; Ed T. Bullmore
- Education: Westminster School; Christ Church, Oxford; Medical College of St Bartholomew's Hospital; King's College London
- Scientific career
- Institutions: University of Hong Kong; University of Cambridge; Wolfson College, Cambridge; St George's Hospital; Bethlem Royal Hospital; Maudsley Hospital; Addenbrooke's Hospital
- Thesis: Analysis of structural and functional magnetic resonance images of the brain (1997)

Edward Thomas Bullmore (born 27 September 1960) is a British neuropsychiatrist, neuroscientist and academic. Since 1999, he has been Professor of Psychiatry at the University of Cambridge and was Head of the Department of Psychiatry between 2014 and 2021. In 2005, he became Vice-President of Experimental Medicine at GlaxoSmithKline while maintaining his post at University of Cambridge.

== Early life ==
Bullmore was born on 27 September 1960 to Jeremy Bullmore and Pamela Bullmore (née Green). His sister is the actress and screenwriter Amelia Bullmore. He was educated at Westminster School, London. He studied clinical medicine at Christ Church, Oxford, and graduated from the University of Oxford with a Bachelor of Arts (BA) degree. He then continued his medical training at St Bartholomew's Hospital, London. He graduated from its Medical College with Bachelor of Medicine, Bachelor of Surgery (MB BS) degrees.

== Career ==
Bullmore began his medical career as an academic rather than a physician. From 1987 to 1988, he was a lecturer in medicine at the University of Hong Kong. He then returned to England, where he began training in his chosen specialisation as a Senior House Officer in psychiatry at St George's Hospital, London. After a year, he moved to Bethlem Royal Hospital and Maudsley Hospital, both specialist psychiatric hospitals in London, where he was Registrar in psychiatry.

In 1993, Bullmore began his research career. That year, he was appointed a Wellcome Trust Research Training Fellow and served in that role for three years. During that time he studied for a Doctor of Philosophy (PhD) degree at King's College London, which he completed in 1997 with a thesis titled "Analysis of structural and functional magnetic resonance images of the brain". In 1996, he was promoted to an Advanced Research Training Fellow for a further three years. His research during this time focused on the mathematical analysis of neurophysiological time series. From 1996 to 1999, he was additionally an honorary Consultant Psychiatrist at Maudsley Hospital.

In 1999, Bullmore joined the University of Cambridge as Professor of Psychiatry. At college level, he was an elected Fellow of Wolfson College, Cambridge between 2002 and 2010. On 9 October 2014, he was appointed Head of the Department of Psychiatry, University of Cambridge.

In 2005, he joined GlaxoSmithKline as Vice-President of Experimental Medicine. From 2005 to 2013, he was also Head of its Clinical Unit based in Addenbrooke's Hospital, Cambridge, Cambridgeshire, which focuses on early clinical drug development projects. Since 2013 he has been Vice-President of Immuno-psychiatry.

== Honours ==
In 2008, Bullmore was elected a Fellow of the Academy of Medical Sciences (FMedSci). In 2009, he was elected a Fellow of the Royal College of Psychiatrists (FRCPsych). In 2010, he was elected a Fellow of the Royal College of Physicians (FRCP). He is also a Senior Investigator at the National Institute for Health Research (NIHR) and an Honorary Fellow of Downing College, Cambridge. He was elected a Fellow of the Royal Society in 2025. In 2025, he was made Regius Professor of Psychiatry.

== Selected works ==
- Cardinal, Rudolf N.; Bullmore, Edward T. (2011). The diagnosis of psychosis. Cambridge: Cambridge University Press. ISBN 978-0521164849.
- Bullmore, Edward (26 April 2018). The Inflamed Mind: A radical new approach to depression. London: Short Books Ltd. ISBN 978-1780723501.
