= List of Have I Got News for You presenters =

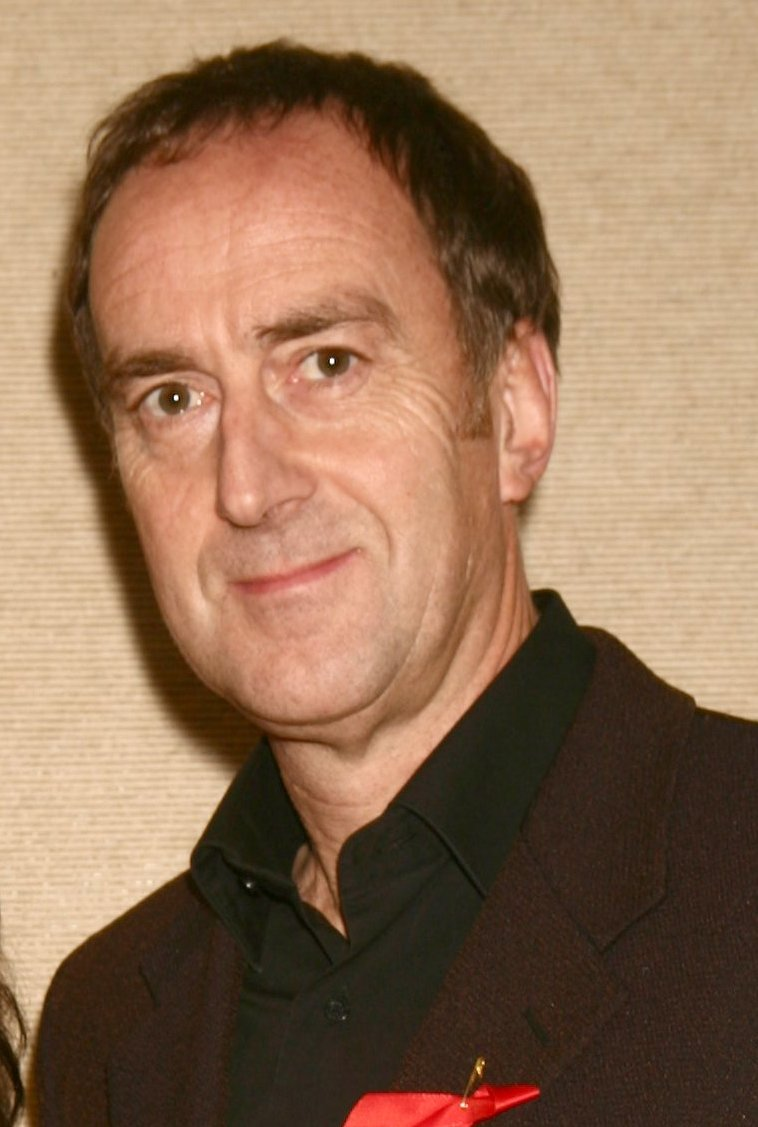
Angus Deayton was the original host from series 1 to 24 (1990–2002)

Have I Got News for You (often abbreviated as HIGNFY) is a British television panel show produced by Hat Trick Productions for the BBC. From its inception in September 1990 until October 2002, the programme was presented by British comedian Angus Deayton, before he was dismissed after two episodes of the 24th series in the wake of revelations about his private life in the press, whereupon the programme employed the use of guest hosts for the remainder of the series and the 25th series, before making it permanent in June 2003. As of 1 November 2024, in the wake of Deayton's dismissal, the programme has seen 135 people host at least one episode. While the majority have made only one appearance, several have made successive appearances in later series.

== List of guest presenters ==
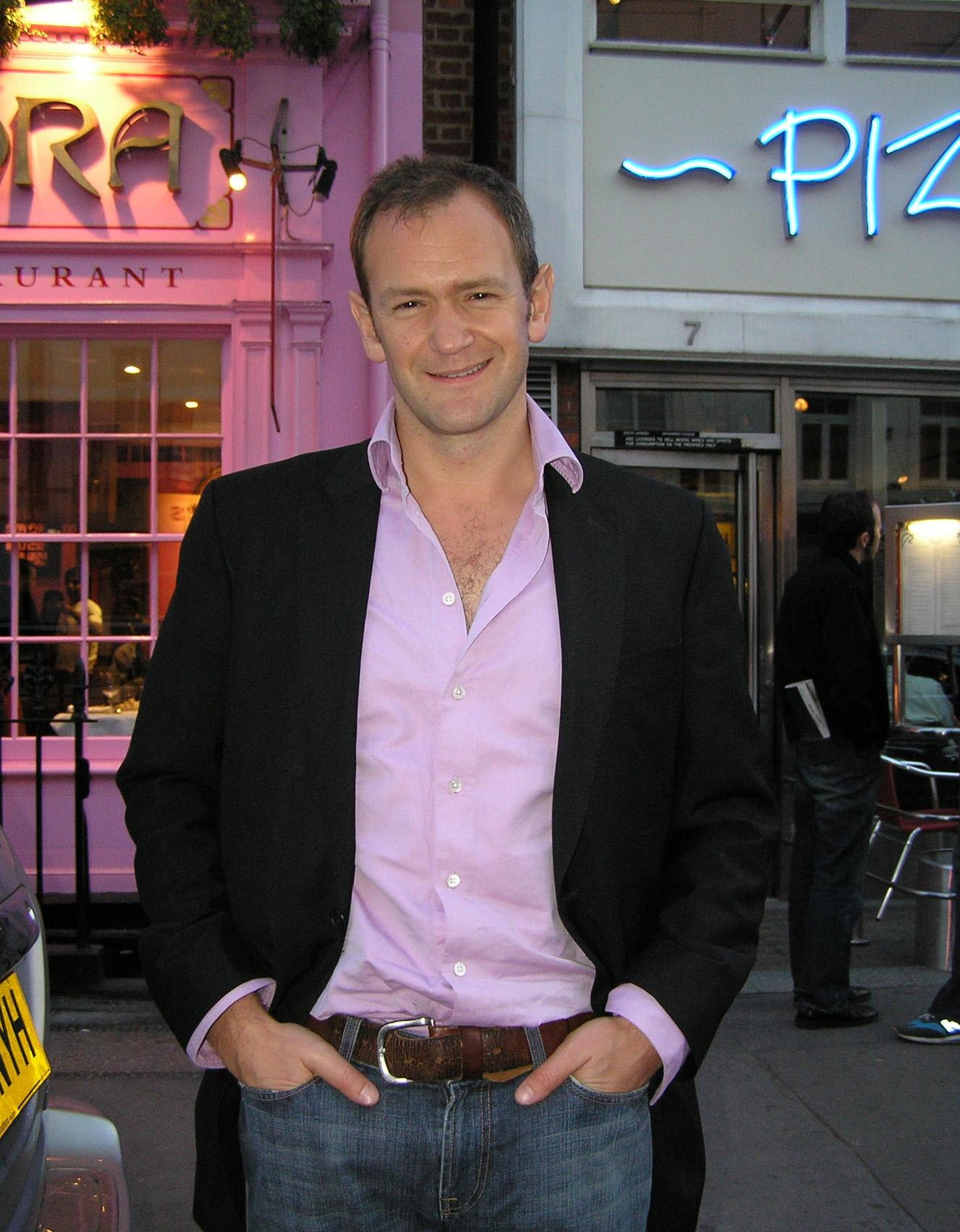
Alexander Armstrong has made the most appearances as guest presenter having hosted 43 episodes.

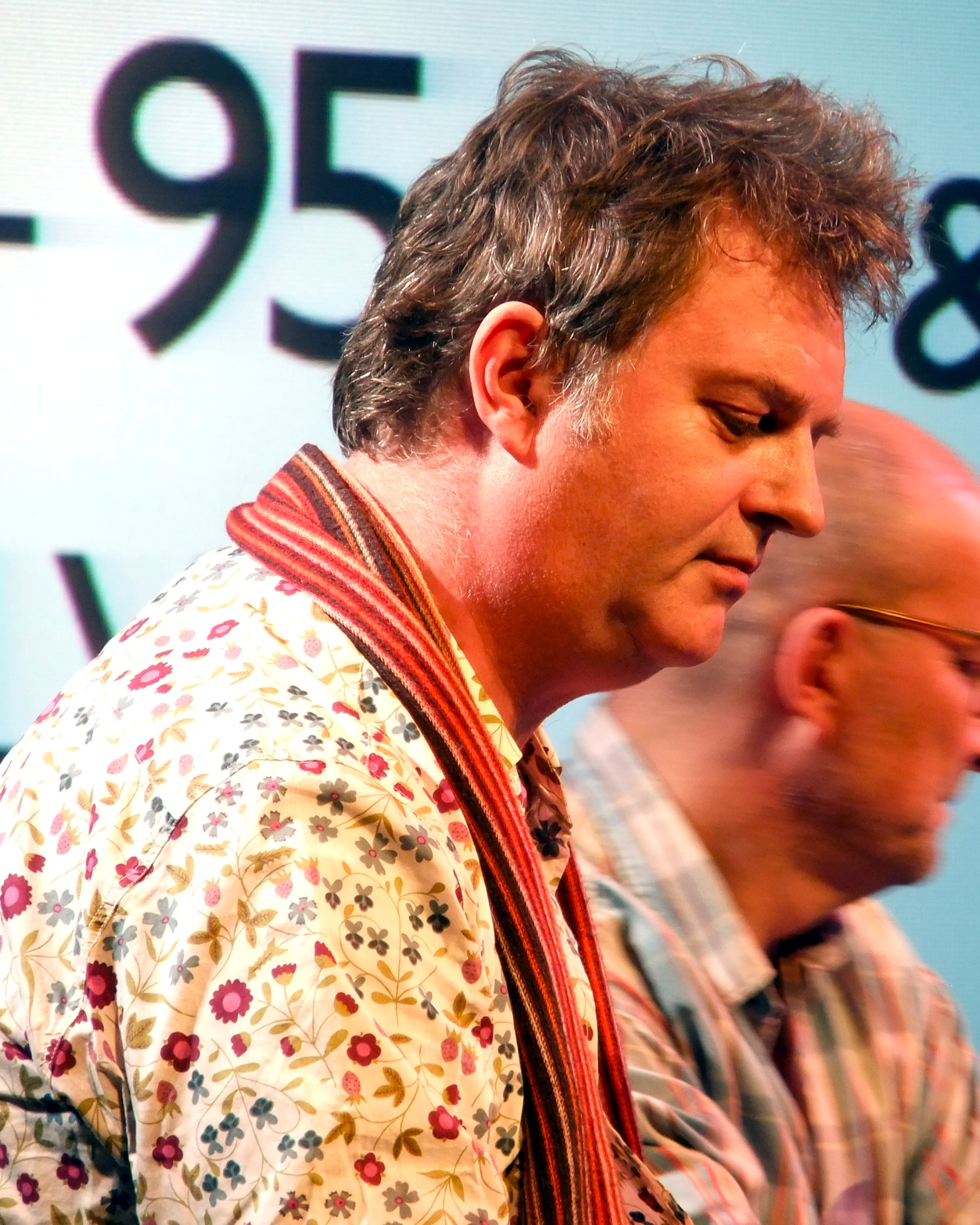
Paul Merton, regular team captain, was the first guest host.

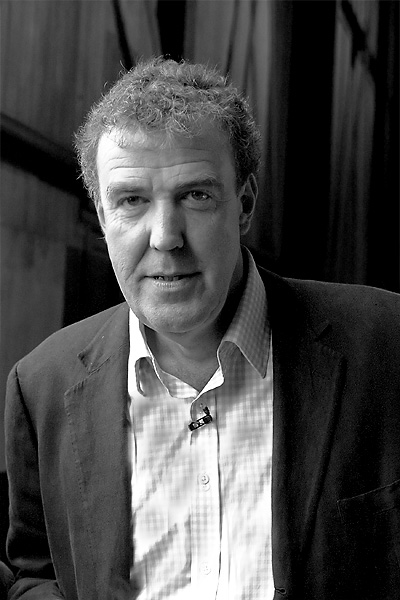
Jeremy Clarkson was the first person to make their debut on the show as a guest host.

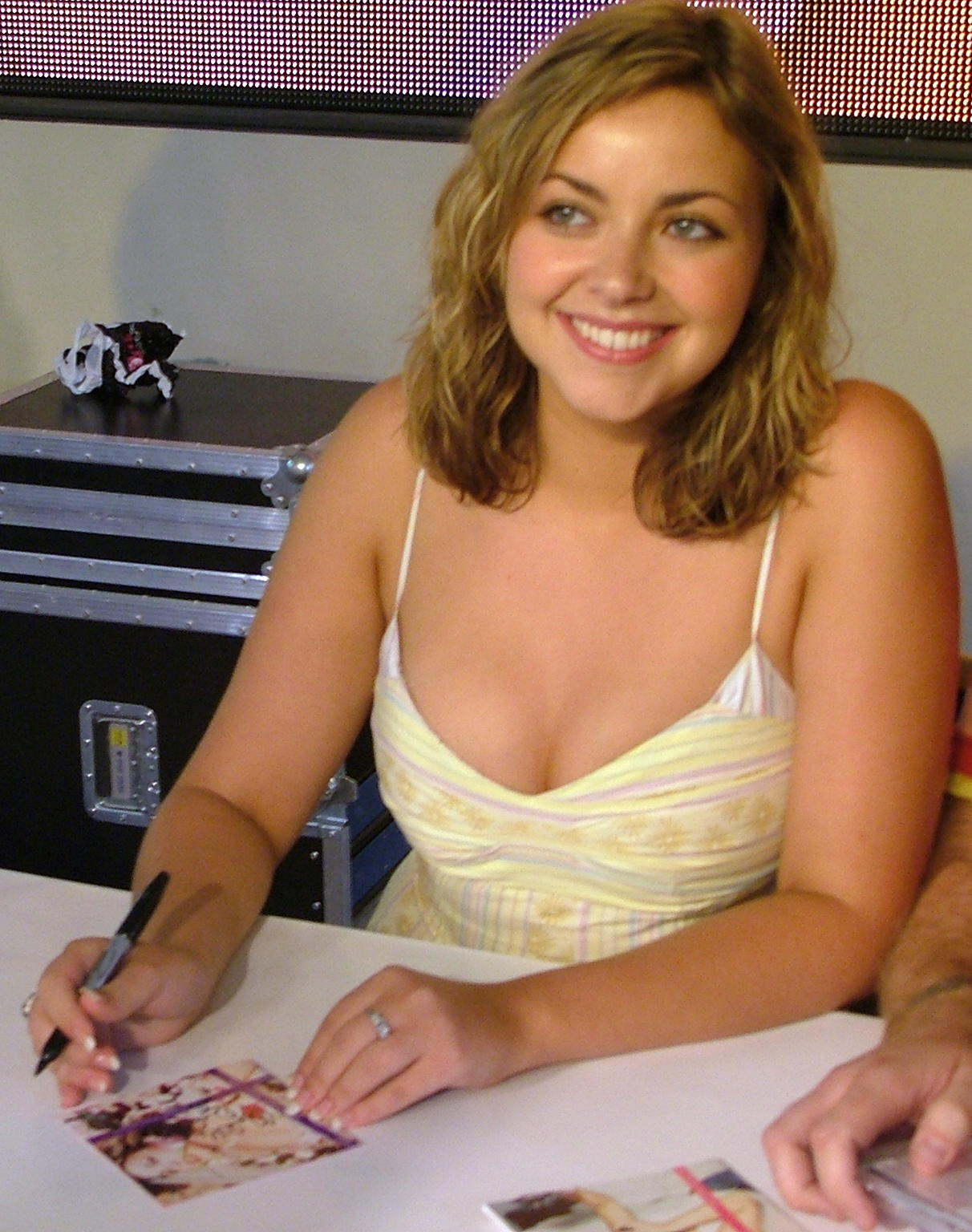
Charlotte Church is the youngest person to present an episode, being 17 years old at the time.

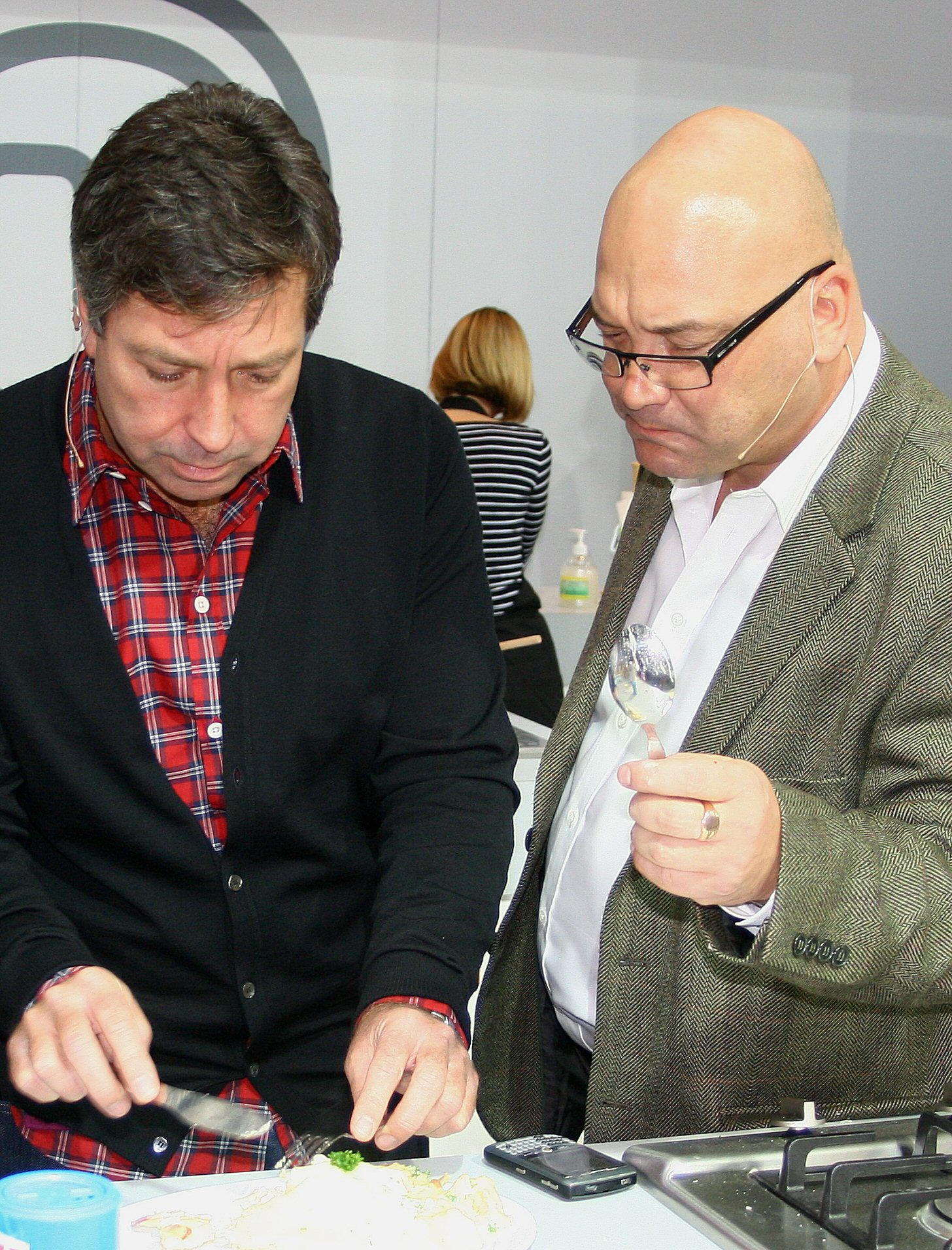
John Torode and Gregg Wallace were the first co-hosts of an episode.

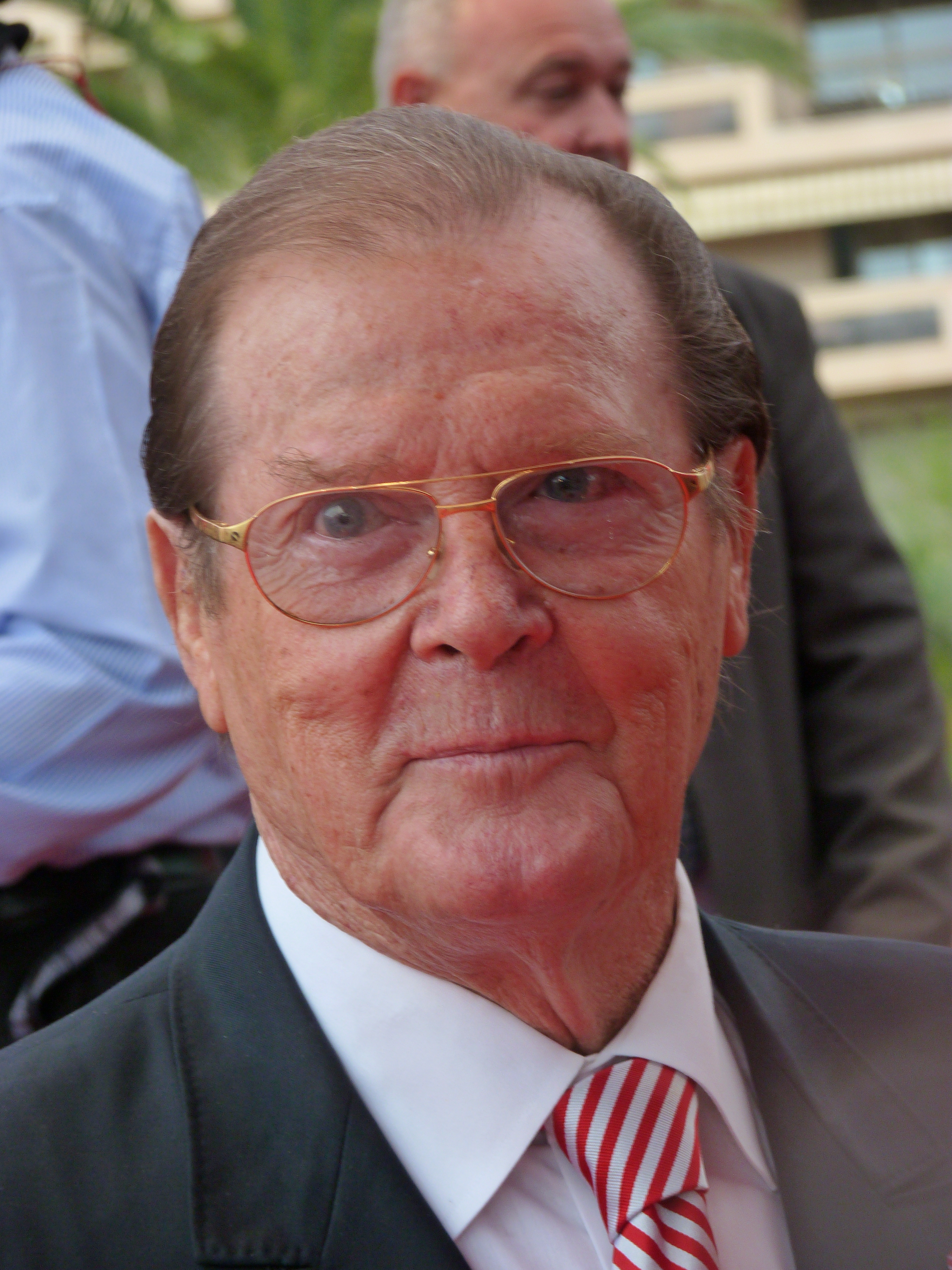
Sir Roger Moore was the oldest person to present an episode, being 85 at the time.

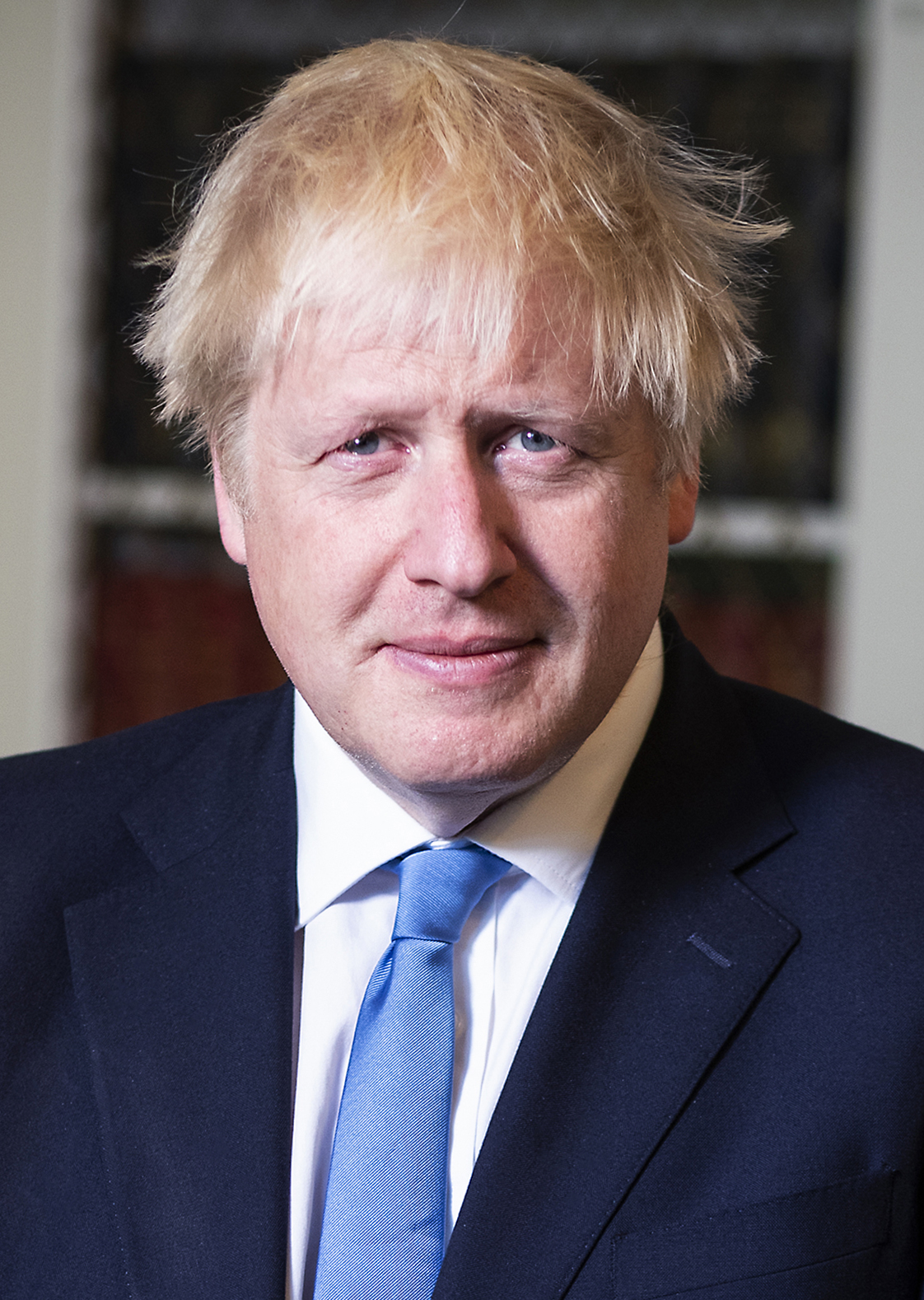
Boris Johnson is the only British prime minister to have previously been a guest host.

The following is a list of the guest presenters that have appeared on the programme. The list denotes them by the order in which they first appear by default, and details number of appearances made, the year and series they appeared in, and if they appear or appeared on the programme as a panellist:

#	Guest presenter	Panellist	No.	Duration	Series
1	Paul Merton	Yes	1	2002	24
2	Anne Robinson	Yes	1	2002	24
3	John Sergeant	Yes	2	2002–2003	24–25
4	Boris Johnson	Yes	4	2002–2003, 2005–2006	24, 26, 30, 32
5	Liza Tarbuck	Yes	1	2002	24
6	Charles Kennedy	Yes	1	2002	24
7	Jeremy Clarkson	Yes	12	2002, 2005–2008, 2010, 2012, 2014–2015	24, 29–31, 33–36, 39, 43–44, 47, 50
8	Martin Clunes	Yes	17	2003, 2009–2011, 2013–2014, 2016–2017, 2019–2021, 2024–2025	25–26, 38–40, 42, 46–48, 51, 54, 58–59, 62, 67, 69–70
9	William Hague	No	3	2003–2005	25, 27, 29
10	Charlotte Church	Yes	2	2003, 2012	25, 44
11	Alexander Armstrong	No	43	2003–2025	25–27, 29–50, 52–56, 58–62, 64–67, 69–70
12	Hugh Dennis	Yes	1	2003	25
13	Sanjeev Bhaskar	Yes	1	2003	25
14	Bruce Forsyth	No	2	2003, 2010	25, 39
15	Jack Dee	Yes	17	2003–2009, 2011, 2014–2015, 2021–2023	26, 28, 30–31, 34–38, 41, 47–49, 62–64, 66
16	John Humphrys	Yes	1	2003	26
17	Jimmy Carr	Yes	1	2003	26
18	Kirsty Young	Yes	14	2003–2005, 2007–2009, 2011–2014, 2017, 2023	26–29, 33–35, 38, 42–43, 46–47, 53, 66
19	Dara Ó Briain	Yes	4	2003–2005	26–27, 29
20	Gyles Brandreth	Yes	1	2003	26
21	Greg Dyke	Yes	1	2004	27
22	Des Lynam	No	3	2004–2005	27–29
23	Andrew Marr	Yes	1	2004	28
24	Robin Cook	No	1	2004	28
25	Jane Leeves	No	1	2004	28
26	Marcus Brigstocke	Yes	2	2004–2005	28–29
27	Neil Kinnock	Yes	1	2004	28
28	Ronnie Corbett	No	1	2004	28
29	Nicholas Parsons	No	1	2005	29
30	Michael Aspel	No	2	2005, 2007	30, 34
31	Chris Langham	Yes	1	2005	30
32	Anna Ford	Yes	1	2005	30
33	Lorraine Kelly	Yes	2	2005, 2024	30, 68
34	Joan Collins	No	1	2005	30
35	Trevor McDonald	Yes	1	2006	31
36	Sean Lock	Yes	1	2006	31
37	Julian Clary	Yes	2	2006, 2008	31, 35
38	Michael Buerk	Yes	1	2006	31
39	Carol Vorderman	Yes	1	2006	31
40	Gordon Ramsay	Yes	1	2006	32
41	Alistair McGowan	No	1	2006	32
42	Jeremy Bowen	Yes	1	2006	32
43	Damian Lewis	No	7	2006, 2009–2010, 2012, 2014, 2020	32, 37, 40, 43–44, 48, 60
44	Ronni Ancona	No	1	2006	32
45	Ann Widdecombe	No	2	2006–2007	32, 34
46	Rob Brydon	No	1	2006	32
47	Adrian Chiles	No	1	2007	33
48	Fern Britton	Yes	2	2007–2008	33, 36
49	Bill Bailey	Yes	7	2007–2009, 2011, 2021, 2023–2024	33, 35, 38, 41, 62, 66–67
50	Chris Tarrant	Yes	1	2007	33
51	Moira Stuart	No	1	2007	33
52	Omid Djalili	Yes	1	2007	34
53	Jo Brand	Yes	29	2007–2024	34, 36, 38–60, 62–63, 66, 68
54	Clive Anderson	Yes	1	2007	34
55	Richard Madeley	Yes	1	2007	34
56	Brian Blessed	No	2	2008, 2013	35, 45
57	Lee Mack	No	6	2008–2011, 2018	35, 37, 39–40, 42, 55
58	Tom Baker	Yes	1	2008	36
59	Al Murray	No	1	2008	36
60	David Mitchell	Yes	13	2008–2009, 2011–2016, 2018–2019, 2021	36–38, 42, 44, 46–48, 50, 52, 56, 58, 61
61	Jerry Springer	No	1	2008	36
62	Frank Skinner	Yes	6	2009–2010, 2013–2015, 2018	37, 40, 45, 48–49, 55
63	Rolf Harris	No	1	2009	37
64	Ruth Jones	No	1	2009	37
65	Miranda Hart	Yes	3	2009–2011	38, 40, 42
66	Dominic West	No	1	2009	38
67	Robert Webb	Yes	1	2010	39
68	Eamonn Holmes	No	1	2010	39
69	John Prescott	Yes	1	2010	39
70	Benedict Cumberbatch	No	1	2010	40
71	John Bishop	Yes	1	2010	40
72	Chris Addison	Yes	1	2010	40
73	Stephen Mangan	Yes	15	2011–2017, 2019–2021, 2024, 2025	41–43, 45, 47, 49, 51–52, 54, 58–60, 62, 68, 69–70
74	Rhod Gilbert	No	4	2011, 2017–2019	41, 54–55, 57
75	John Torode and Gregg Wallace	No	1	2011	41
76	Alan Johnson	Yes	2	2011, 2019	41, 57
77	Sharon Horgan	No	1	2011	41
78	Dan Stevens	No	1	2011	42
79	Sue Perkins	Yes	4	2011, 2014–2015, 2025	42, 48, 50, 69
80	Kathy Burke	Yes	3	2012–2013, 2015	43, 46, 50
81	William Shatner	No	1	2012	43
82	Alastair Campbell	No	1	2012	43
83	Clare Balding	Yes	1	2012	44
84	Roger Moore	No	1	2012	44
85	Jack Whitehall	Yes	2	2012–2013	44, 46
86	Daniel Radcliffe	No	2	2012, 2015	44, 49
87	Warwick Davis	No	1	2013	45
88	Ray Winstone	No	1	2013	45
89	Mel Giedroyc	No	6	2013, 2016–2017, 2022–2024	45, 52, 54, 63, 65, 68
90	Robert Lindsay	No	2	2013	45–46
91	Richard Osman	Yes	1	2013	46
92	Stephen Merchant	No	1	2013	46
93	Jennifer Saunders	Yes	4	2014, 2018, 2020	47–48, 56, 60
94	Victoria Coren Mitchell	Yes	22	2014–2025	48–64, 66–70
95	Robert Peston	Yes	1	2015	49
96	Gary Lineker	No	4	2015–2016, 2018	49, 51–52, 56
97	Charlie Brooker	Yes	6	2015–2016, 2019–2020, 2023–2024	50, 52, 58–59, 65, 68
98	Michael Sheen	No	1	2015	50
99	David Tennant	No	9	2015–2021, 2023, 2025	50–51, 54, 56–57, 59, 61, 65, 69
100	Tracey Ullman	No	2	2016, 2018	51, 55
101	Frankie Boyle	Yes	2	2016–2017	51, 53
102	Katherine Ryan	Yes	4	2016–2017, 2019, 2025	51, 54, 57, 70
103	Nick Clegg	No	1	2016	52
104	Tom Hollander	No	1	2016	52
105	Patrick Stewart	No	1	2017	53
106	David Harewood	No	1	2017	53
107	Ed Balls	No	1	2017	53
108	Adil Ray	Yes	5	2017, 2019–2020, 2022, 2025	53, 58, 60, 64, 70
109	Richard Ayoade	No	13	2017–2023, 2025	54–57, 60–66, 69–70
110	Jeremy Paxman	No	1	2018	55
111	Steph McGovern	Yes	9	2018–2023, 2025	56–61, 64–65, 70
112	Danny Dyer	No	1	2018	56
113	David Dimbleby	No	1	2019	57
114	Helen McCrory	No	1	2019	58
115	Romesh Ranganathan	Yes	3	2020–2021	59–61
116	Adrian Dunbar	No	1	2021	61
117	Aisling Bea	No	1	2021	61
118	Clive Myrie	Yes	5	2021–2024	62–65, 67
119	Jess Phillips	Yes	1	2021	62
120	Anna Maxwell Martin	No	1	2022	63
121	Miles Jupp	Yes	1	2022	63
122	Jon Richardson	Yes	1	2022	63
123	Gary Neville	No	1	2022	64
124	Diane Morgan	Yes	1	2023	65
125	Naga Munchetty	Yes	2	2023	65–66
126	Harry Hill	No	1	2023	65
127	Hannah Fry	Yes	4	2023–2025	66–68, 70
128	Guz Khan	Yes	1	2023	66
129	Martin Lewis	No	1	2024	67
130	Jason Manford	Yes	2	2024–2025	67, 70
131	Phil Wang	Yes	1	2024	67
132	Alex Horne	No	1	2024	67
133	Kevin Bridges	Yes	1	2024	68
134	Amol Rajan	No	1	2024	68
135	Roy Wood Jr.	No	3	2024–2026	68–69, 71
136	Katherine Parkinson	No	1	2025	69
137	Angela Rippon	Yes	1	2025	69
138	Gabby Logan	Yes	1	2025	70
139	Monty Don	No	1	2026	71

== See also ==
- List of television presenters
- List of Have I Got News for You episodes
