= Work experience (disambiguation) =

Work experience is voluntary work by young people, often students.

Work Experience may also refer to:

- Work Experience (film), a 1989 British short comedy film
- "Work Experience" (Drifters), a 2013 British TV sitcom episode
- "Work Experience" (The Inbetweeners), a 2009 British TV sitcom episode
- "Work Experience" (The Office), a 2001 British TV sitcom episode
- The Work Experience, a British comedy series
- Rhod Gilbert's Work Experience, a British comedy series
