= Lloyd Langford =

Welsh comedian (born 1983)

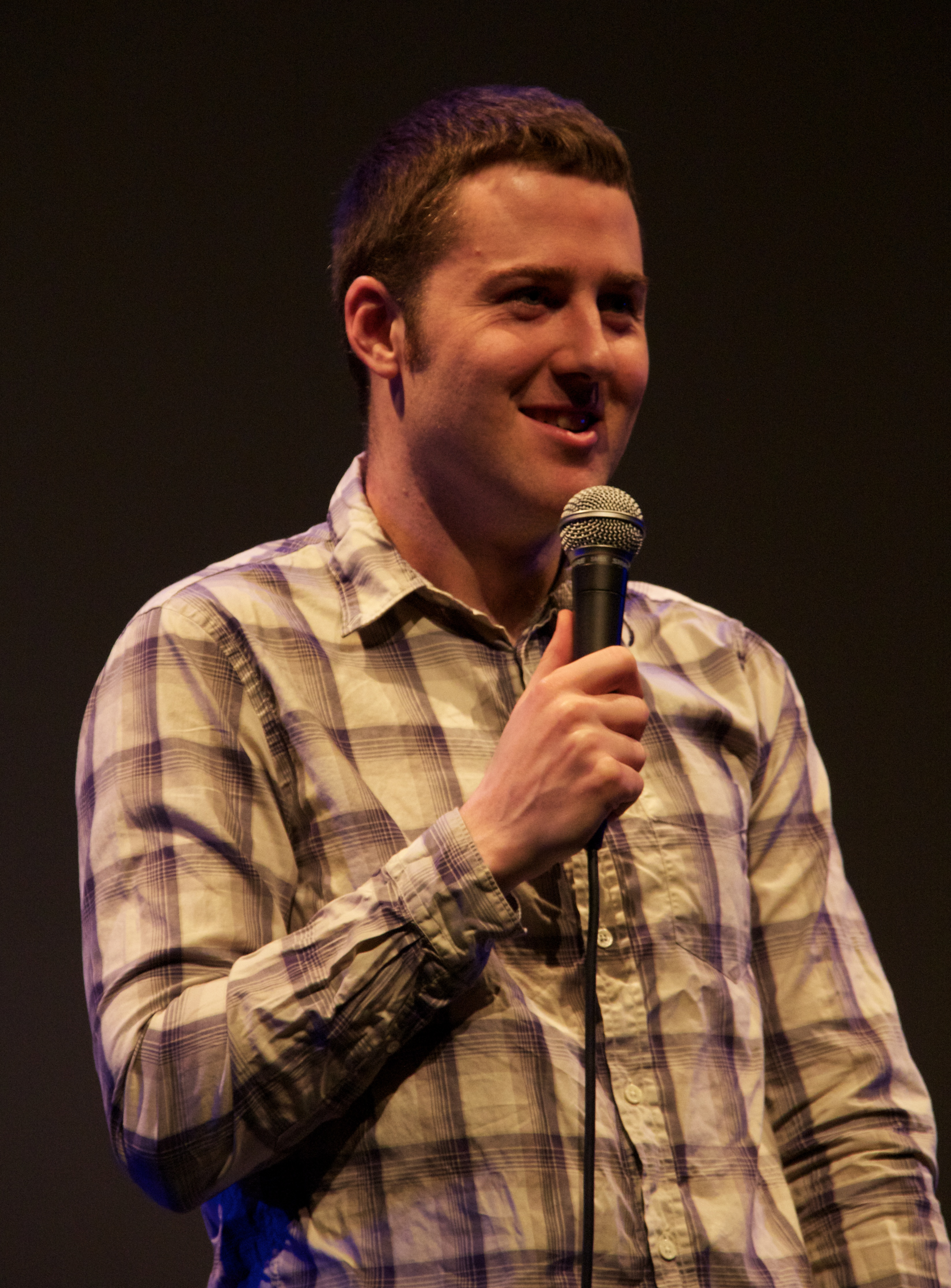
- Lloyd Langford hosting Bright Club London in November 2011
- Born: 6 August 1983 (age 43); Baglan, Neath Port Talbot, Wales
- Occupations: Comedian, comedy writer
- Partner: Anne Edmonds (2018–present)
- Children: 1
- Website: http://www.lloydlangford.com

Lloyd Langford (born 6 August 1983) is a Welsh comedian, comedy writer and voice artist.

== Early life and education ==
Langford was born in Baglan, Neath Port Talbot. He studied film and television at the University of Warwick. He was regularly MC at Warwick Comedy's weekly Sunday night stand-up show.

== Career ==
Langford has provided audience warm-up on QI. Langford has appeared as a guest on several comedy and panel shows, including Russell Howard's Good News, The News Quiz, The Now Show, 8 Out of 10 Cats, QI, The Dog Ate My Homework, Have You Been Paying Attention (TV2 New Zealand), and The Jon Richardson Show, and has written additional material for other shows, including Live at the Apollo, Never Mind the Buzzcocks and The King is Dead.

He was a contributor on Rhod Gilbert's Work Experience. In August 2010, Langford made the move to television when the BBC commissioned eight episodes of Ask Rhod Gilbert, following a successful pilot earlier in 2010. The show featured Rhod Gilbert, Greg Davies and Langford as regular panellists, answering random trivia questions, such as 'Who would win in a race, Usain Bolt or a grizzly bear?', posed by the public and celebrities, with additional celebrity guests on the panel. The show ran for two series. He co-hosted the radio show Rhod Gilbert's Bulging Barrel of Laughs. He played Rhod Gilbert's brother in the sitcom pilot Rhod Gilbert's Leaving Llanbobl. He occasionally co-hosts Gilbert's weekly show on BBC Radio Wales.

Langford has appeared several times on the BBC Radio comedy panel show The Unbelievable Truth and is a co-writer and performer on the BBC Radio Wales sketch show Here Be Dragons; the show won the 2014 Sony Award - Bronze for Best Comedy. He has written jokes for Gilbert, Frankie Boyle and Simon Amstell.

Langford occasionally tours as part of comedy collective GIT with Dan Atkinson and Jon Richardson; his first solo tour was titled Rare Bit, a reference to his Welsh heritage. He has performed at the Edinburgh Festival Fringe multiple times.

In October 2012, along with 463 other players, Langford took part in BBC Radio 5 Live's attempt to set a new Guinness World Record for the 'most players in a continuous five-a-side exhibition match'. This was for BBC Children in Need, along with former footballer and TV pundit Robbie Savage and BBC Radio 5 Live travel reporter Lindsey Chapman.

In the early months of 2019, Langford toured his most recent Edinburgh show, Why the Long Face?, in Australia and New Zealand.

From 2022 Langford has appeared on Australian TV shows Have You Been Paying Attention and Thank God You're Here on Channel 10.

In 2024, Langford competed on Taskmaster Australia, alongside his partner Anne Edmonds. Langford defeated Edmonds in a tiebreaker to win the season.

== Personal life ==
Langford is originally from Baglan, Neath Port Talbot. He has lived in Cardiff and London and is currently based in Melbourne, Australia, with his partner, comedian Anne Edmonds. They had a daughter in October 2021.

A republican, Langford opposes the monarchy, a belief described by Chortle as "a deeply held conviction" in a review of his 2014 show Old Fashioned.

== Awards ==
Year	Award	Category	Result
2004	Chortle Student Comedian of the Year	-	Won
2008	Chortle Awards	Breakthrough act	Nominated
2017	Winner of Celebrity Mastermind		Winner

== Filmography ==
Film
Year	Title	Role	Notes
2026	The Pout-Pout Fish	TBA	Voice

Television
Year	Title	Role	Notes
2024	Austin	Forklift Driver	Episode 6
