= Parliamentary Under-Secretary of State for Safeguarding and Violence Against Women and Girls =

British junior ministerial role

United Kingdom Parliamentary Under-Secretary of State for Safeguarding and Violence Against Women and Girls
- Royal Arms of His Majesty's Government

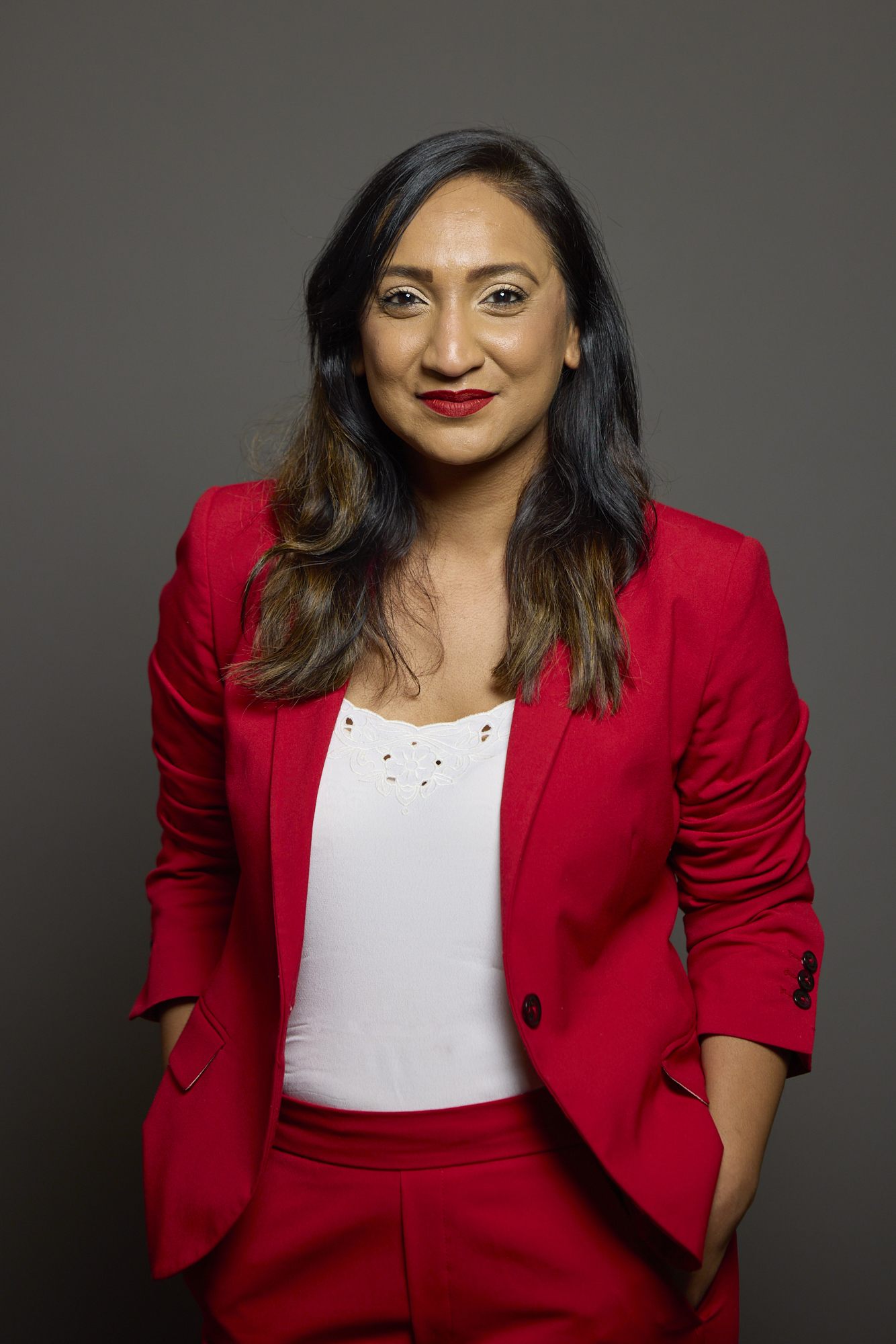
- Incumbent; Satvir Kaur since 22 July 2026
- Home Office
- Style: Minister
- Appointer: The Monarch on advice of the Prime Minister
- Website: Parliamentary Under-Secretary of State (Minister for Safeguarding and Violence Against Women and Girls)

The Parliamentary Under-Secretary of State for Safeguarding and Violence Against Women and Girls (also known as Minister for Safeguarding) is a junior role in His Majesty's Government in the Home Office. The role has been held by Satvir Kaur since July 2026.

== Responsibilities ==
The minister has the following responsibilities:

- tackling violence against women and girls, including:
  - domestic abuse
  - FGM and forced marriage
  - child sexual abuse and exploitation
  - Disclosure and Barring Service
  - Gangmasters and Labour Abuse Authority
  - sexual violence
  - rape review
  - prostitution
  - stalking
  - hate crime
  - crime prevention
  - early youth intervention
  - victim support
  - victims elements of RASSO

== List of ministers ==
Name	Portrait	Term of office		Party	Ministry
Parliamentary Under-Secretary of State for Preventing Abuse, Exploitation and Crime
Karen Bradley		8 February 2014	14 July 2016	Conservative	Cameron (II)
Parliamentary Under-Secretary of State for Crime, Safeguarding and Vulnerability
Sarah Newton		17 July 2016	9 November 2017	Conservative	May (I)
Sarah Newton		17 July 2016	9 November 2017	Conservative	May (II)
Parliamentary Under-Secretary of State for Safeguarding
Victoria Atkins		9 November 2017	16 September 2021	Conservative	May (II)
Victoria Atkins		9 November 2017	16 September 2021	Conservative	Johnson (I)
Victoria Atkins		9 November 2017	16 September 2021	Conservative	Johnson (II)
Rachel Maclean		16 September 2021	6 July 2022	Conservative	Johnson (II)
Amanda Solloway		8 July 2022	20 September 2022	Conservative	Johnson (II)
Mims Davies		20 September 2022	27 October 2022	Conservative	Truss
Sarah Dines		27 October 2022	13 November 2023	Conservative	Sunak
Parliamentary Under-Secretary of State for Victims and Safeguarding (Jointly with Ministry of Justice)
Laura Farris		13 November 2023	5 July 2024	Conservative	Sunak
Parliamentary Under-Secretary of State for Safeguarding and Violence Against Women and Girls
Jess Phillips		9 July 2024	12 May 2026	Labour	Starmer
Natalie Fleet		12 May 2026	22 July 2026	Labour	Starmer
Satvir Kaur		22 July 2026	Incumbent	Labour	Burnham
