= List of Never Mind the Buzzcocks presenters =

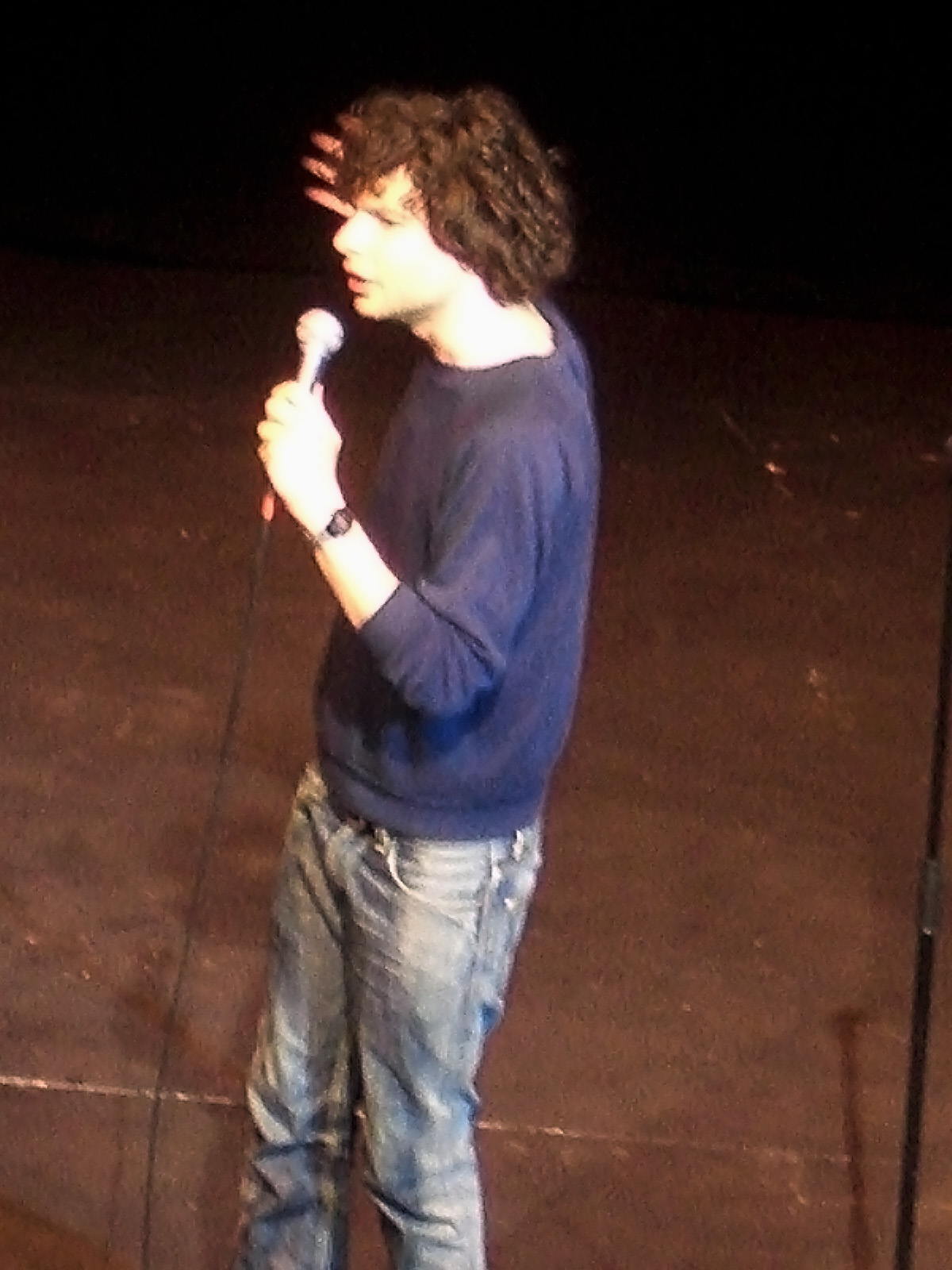
Simon Amstell who was the second permanent presenter from 2006 to 2008.

Never Mind the Buzzcocks is a British comedy panel television programme broadcast on BBC Two in 1996–2015, and revived on Sky Max in 2021. Its presenter has the role of introducing the show, explaining the rules to each round, using their discretion to award points and providing information where required. They also provided comedy with jokes, satire and visual gags. 63 people (including the regulars) presented, or co-presented, at least one regular episode of Never Mind the Buzzcocks.

Buzzcocks was originally presented by English comedian, radio DJ and television presenter Mark Lamarr between 1996 and 2005. After 17 series Lamarr decided to have a break from the show, and did not return. For the 18th series, similarly to Have I Got News for You, each episode was presented by a different guest each week. After one series of guests, comedian and presenter Simon Amstell was announced as the next permanent presenter in 2006, he had presented the second episode of series 18 and had also appeared on the show as a guest twice: the eighth episode of series 13 and the eleventh of series 16. He remained in the role for four series up to 2008 leaving to focus on his live stand-up. Upon Amstell's departure the show once again used guest presenters from the 23rd series to the 27th. In July 2014 it was announced that the third permanent host will be Welsh comedian Rhod Gilbert. Gilbert had previously presented the second episode of series 23 and the eleventh of series 25, he also appeared as a guest once on the fourth episode of series 18. The show was cancelled in 2015, after Gilbert had presented one series. It returned on Sky Max in 2021 for a 29th series, hosted by Greg Davies.

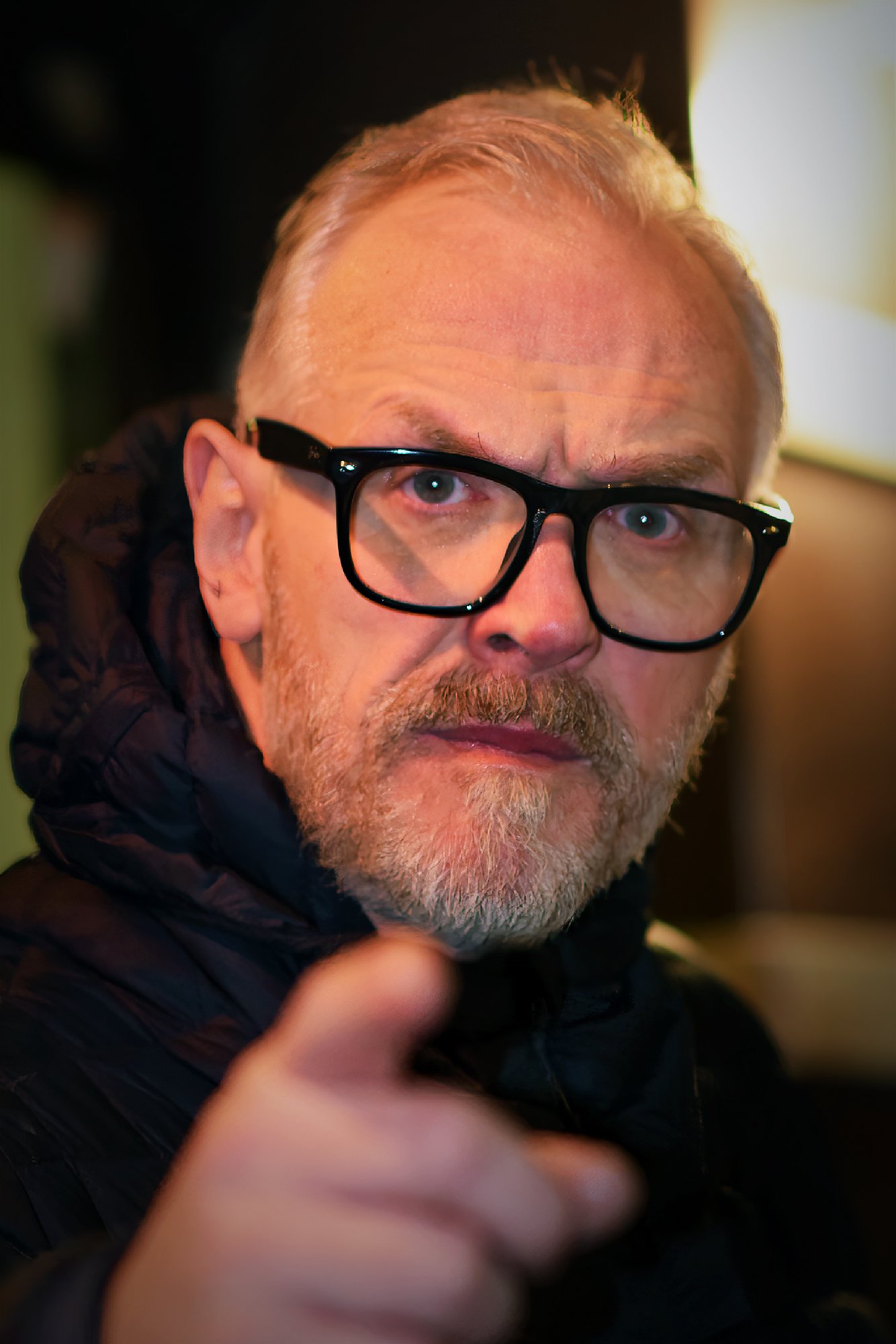
Greg Davies has presented the show since 2021, when it was revived on Sky Max.

== Regular presenters ==
The following is a list of the regular presenters in the order they first appeared. The periods when guest presenters were used are also included for a comprehensive timeline.

Episodes by presenter
| Host | Episodes |
|---|---|
| Lamarr | 156 |
| Amstell | 37 |
| R. Gilbert | 12 |
| G. Davies | 45 |
| Guests | 67 |

| # | Presenter | Hosted | Tenure began | Tenure ended | Series |
|---|---|---|---|---|---|
| 1 | Mark Lamarr | 156 | 12 November 1996 | 31 December 2005 | 1–17 |
| 2 | Guests | 7 | 13 March 2006 | 24 April 2006 | 18 |
| 3 | Simon Amstell | 37 | 26 October 2006 | 11 December 2008 | 19–22 |
| 4 | Guests | 60 | 1 October 2009 | 16 December 2013 | 23–27 |
| 5 | Rhod Gilbert | 12 | 29 September 2014 | 22 December 2014 | 28 |
| 6 | Greg Davies | 45 | 21 September 2021 | 18 December 2025 | 29–33 |

== Guest presenters ==
The following is a list of the guest presenters in the order they first appeared.

– indicates this person has not hosted a regular episode
^{(#)} – indicates the number of episodes presented if highlights and specials are included

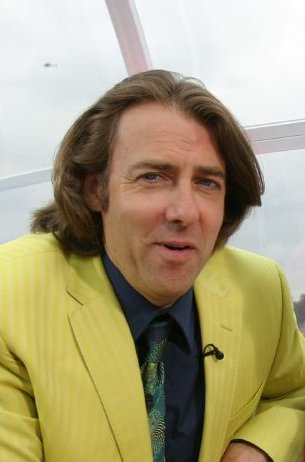
Jonathan Ross was the first guest presenter.

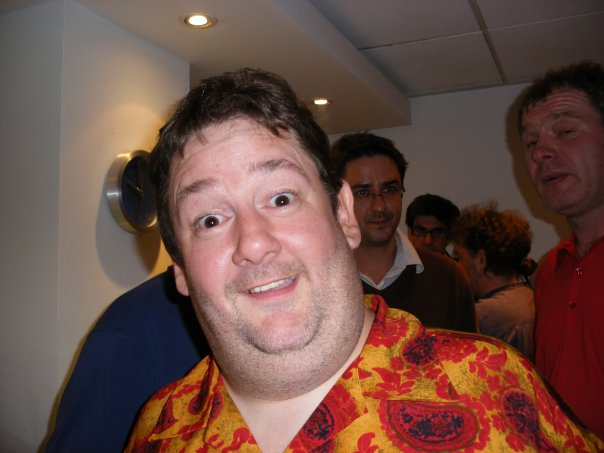
Johnny Vegas was the final person to guest present an episode.

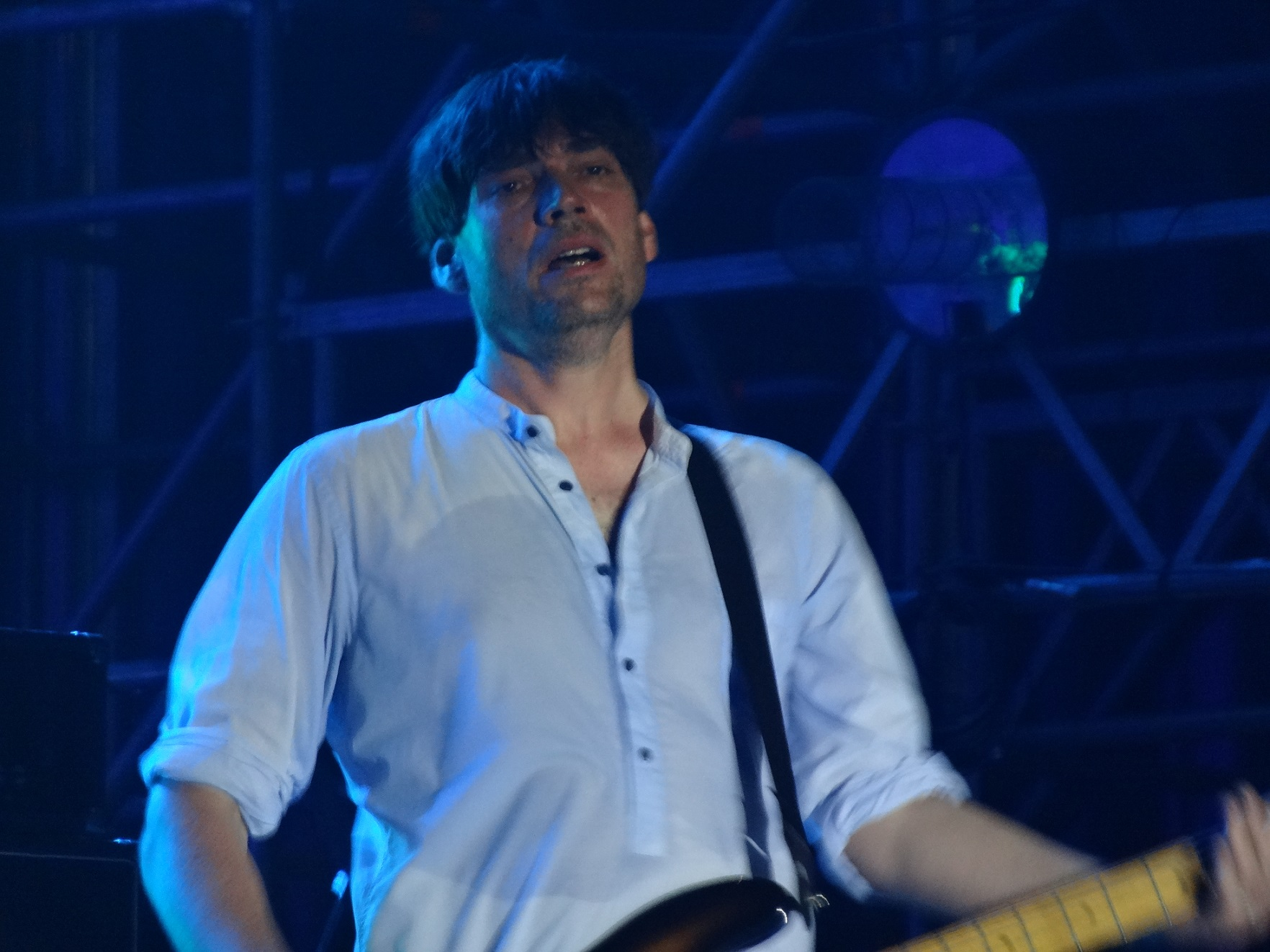
Musician Alex James also narrated What a Load of Buzzcocks

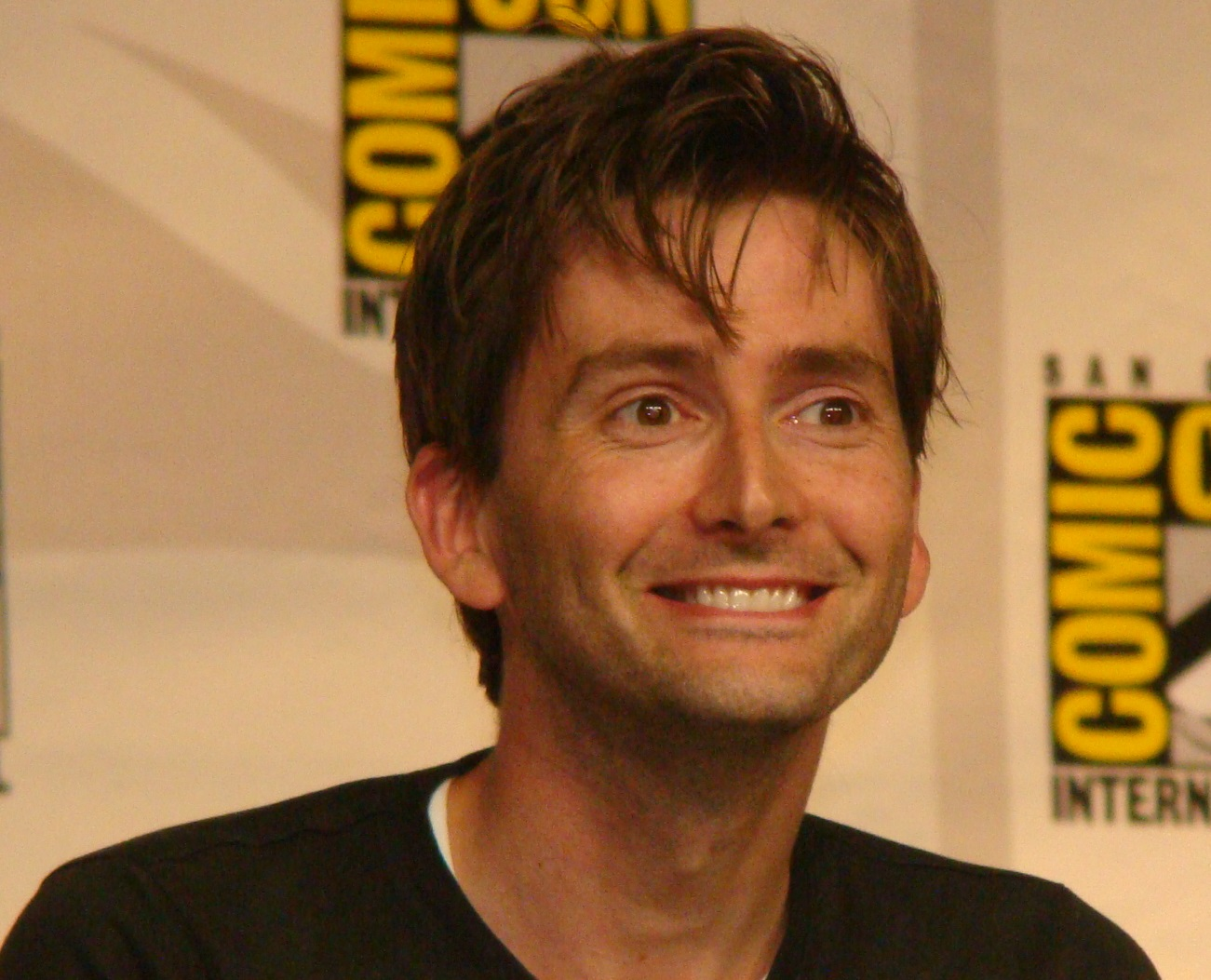
Actor David Tennant presented a Doctor Who themed episode.

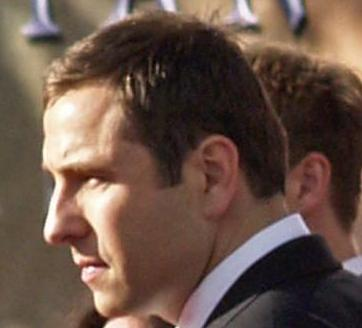
David Walliams presented a special episode as part of his 24 Hour Panel People.

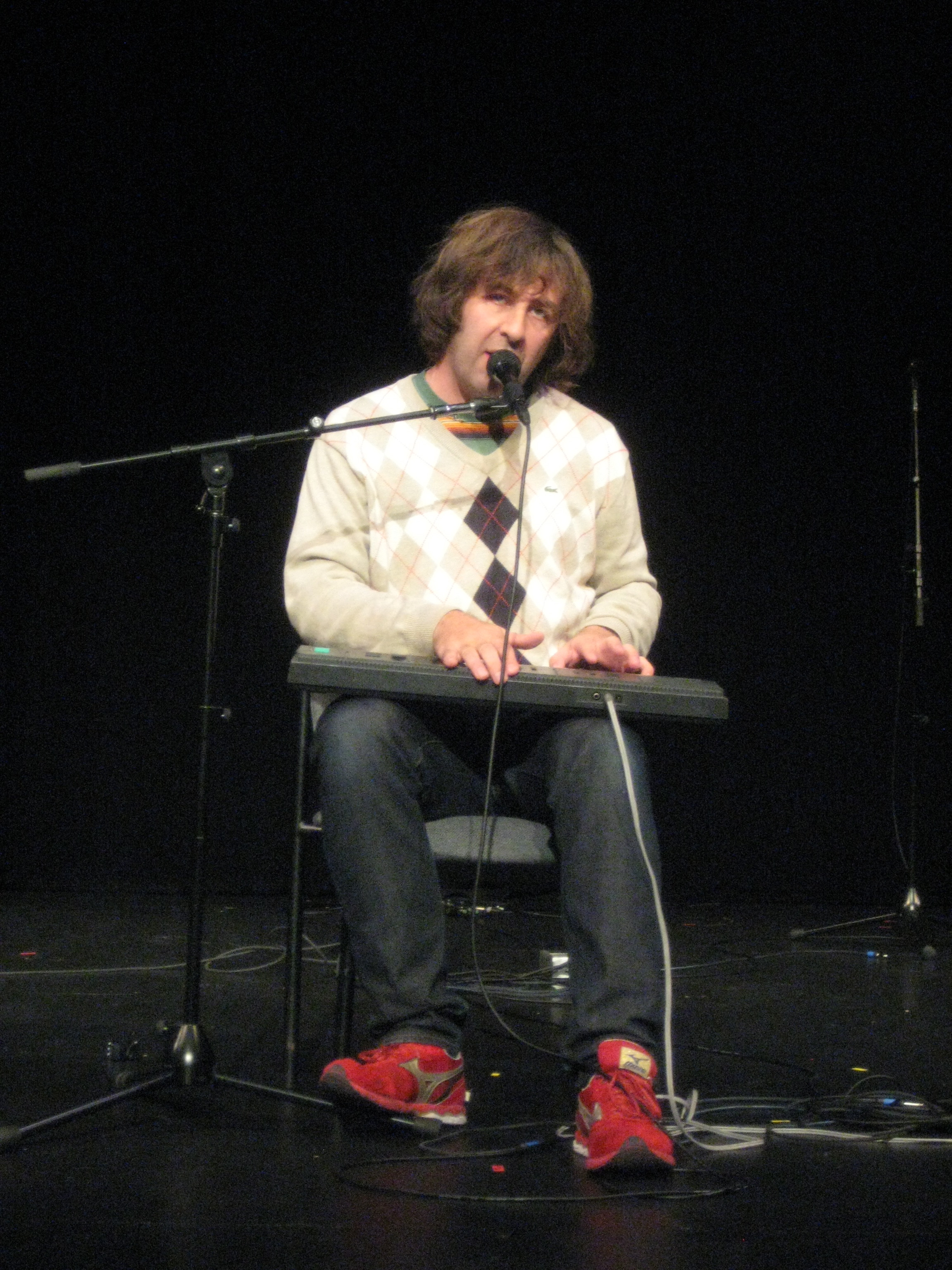
Comedian David O'Doherty presented a regular episode, best of and the special at the Latitude Festival.

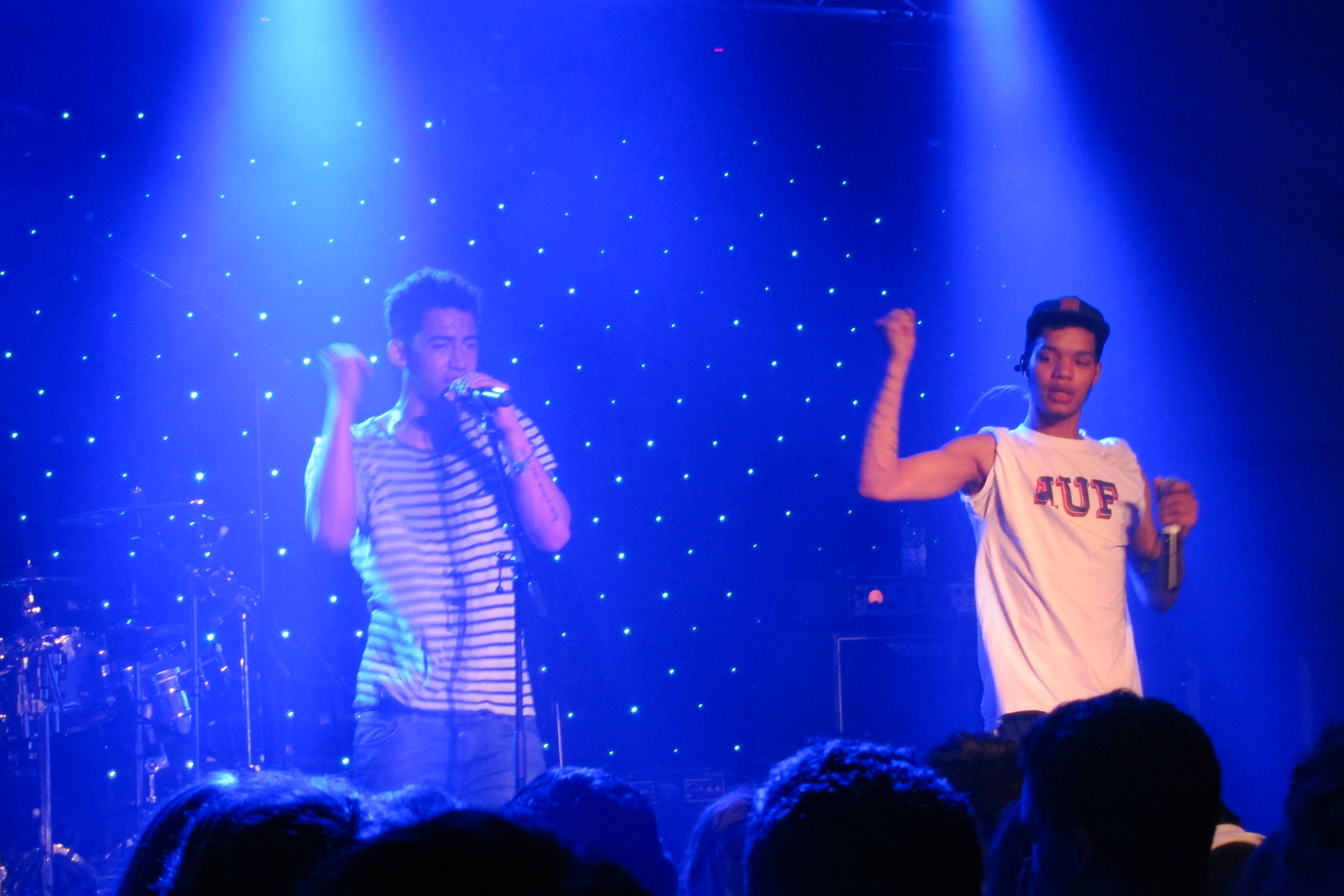
Rizzle Kicks were the only co-presenters of an episode.

| # | Presenter | Hosted | Year | Series | Notes |
|---|---|---|---|---|---|
| 1 | Jonathan Ross | 1 | 2006 | 18 | |
| 2 | Simon Amstell | 1 | 2006 | 18 | Became the regular presenter for series 19 (2006) to 22 (2008) |
| 3 | Ricky Wilson | 1 | 2006 | 18 | |
| 4 | Lauren Laverne | 1 | 2006 | 18 | |
| 5 | Jeremy Clarkson | 1 | 2006 | 18 | |
| 6 | Huey Morgan | 1 | 2006 | 18 | |
| 7 | Dale Winton | 1 | 2006 | 18 | |
| 8 | James Corden | 1 | 2009 | 23 | |
| 9 | Rhod Gilbert | 2 | 2009, 2011 | 23, 25 | Became the regular presenter for series 28 (2014) |
| 10 | Alex James | 1 | 2009 | 23 | Narrated What a Load of Buzzcocks |
| 11 | Jack Whitehall | 3 | 2009, 2012, 2013 | 23, 26, 27 | |
| 12 | Frank Skinner | 1 | 2009 | 23 | |
| 13 | Claudia Winkleman | 1 | 2009 | 23 | |
| 14 | Mark Watson | 1 | 2009 | 23 | |
| 15 | Martin Freeman | 1 | 2009 | 23 | |
| 16 | David Walliams | 1^{(2)} | 2009 | 23 | Also presented the 2011 Comic Relief special |
| 17 | Dermot O'Leary | 1 | 2009 | 23 | |
| 18 | Frankie Boyle | 2 | 2009, 2011 | 23, 24 | |
| 19 | David Tennant | 1 | 2009 | 23 | |
| 20 | Mark Ronson | 1 | 2010 | 24 | |
| 21 | Catherine Tate | 1 | 2010 | 24 | |
| 22 | Jack Dee | 2 | 2010, 2011 | 24, 25 | |
| 23 | Terry Wogan | 1 | 2010 | 24 | |
| 24 | David O'Doherty | 1^{(3)} | 2010 | 24 | Also presented the Best of Series 24 and live Latitude special |
| 25 | Tim Minchin | 1 | 2010 | 24 | |
| 26 | Tim Westwood | 1 | 2010 | 24 | |
| 27 | Lee Mack | 2 | 2010, 2012 | 24, 26 | |
| 28 | Juliette Lewis | 1 | 2010 | 24 | |
| 29 | Josh Groban | 1 | 2010 | 24 | |
| 30 | Robert Webb | 1 | 2010 | 24 | |
| 31 | David Hasselhoff | 1 | 2011 | 25 | |
| 32 | Lorraine Kelly | 1 | 2011 | 25 | |
| 33 | Adam Buxton | 1 | 2011 | 25 | |
| 34 | Will Young | 1 | 2011 | 25 | |
| 35 | Greg Davies | 1 | 2011 | 25 | Has been the regular presenter since series 29 (2021) |
| 36 | Alice Cooper | 1 | 2011 | 25 | |
| 37 | James Blunt | 1 | 2011 | 25 | |
| 38 | Tinie Tempah | 1 | 2011 | 25 | |
| 39 | Cilla Black | 1 | 2011 | 25 | |
| 40 | John Barrowman | 1 | 2011 | 25 | |
| — | Katy Brand | 0^{(1)} | 2011 | —N/a | Presented the 2011 Children in Need special |
| — | Jake Humphrey | 0^{(1)} | 2012 | —N/a | Presented the 2012 Sport Relief special |
| 41 | Kathy Burke | 1 | 2012 | 26 | |
| 42 | Example | 1 | 2012 | 26 | |
| 43 | Nick Grimshaw | 1 | 2012 | 26 | |
| 44 | Ne-Yo | 1 | 2012 | 26 | |
| 45 | Richard Ayoade | 1 | 2012 | 26 | |
| 46 | Richard Madeley | 1 | 2012 | 26 | |
| 47 | Alex Horne | 1 | 2012 | 26 | Horne was accompanied by his band, The Horne Section |
| 48 | Stephen Mangan | 1 | 2012 | 26 | |
| 49 | Liza Tarbuck | 1 | 2012 | 26 | |
| 50 | Bob Mortimer | 1 | 2012 | 26 | |
| 51 | John Hannah | 1 | 2013 | 27 | |
| 52 | Russell Howard | 1 | 2013 | 27 | |
| 53 | Peter Andre | 1 | 2013 | 27 | |
| 54 | Sara Cox | 1 | 2013 | 27 | |
| 55 | Kristen Schaal | 1 | 2013 | 27 | |
| 56 | Eamonn Holmes | 1 | 2013 | 27 | |
| 57 | Rizzle Kicks | 1 | 2013 | 27 | The only time more than one person hosted the show |
| 58 | Michael Bolton | 1 | 2013 | 27 | |
| 59 | Warwick Davis | 1 | 2013 | 27 | |
| 60 | Dizzee Rascal | 1 | 2013 | 27 | |
| — | Krishnan Guru-Murthy | 0^{(1)} | 2013 | 27 | Presented the Best of Series 27 episode |
| 61 | Johnny Vegas | 1 | 2013 | 27 | |

== See also ==
- List of television presenters
- List of Never Mind the Buzzcocks episodes
