= Rhod Gilbert's Bulging Barrel of Laughs =

- Genre: Stand up, Music, Panel show
- Running time: 1 hour
- Country of origin: United Kingdom
- Language: English
- Home station: BBC Radio 2
- Starring: Rhod Gilbert, Greg Davies, Lloyd Langford, Sarah Millican
- Produced by: Julia McKenzie and Lianne Coop
- Original release: 4 September – 9 October 2010
- No. of series: 1
- No. of episodes: 6
- Website: Rhod Gilbert's Bulging Barrel of Laughs Homepage

Rhod Gilbert's Bulging Barrel of Laughs is a 6-part radio show on BBC Radio 2 hosted by comedian Rhod Gilbert. The show is co-hosted by Greg Davies and Lloyd Langford with support from Sarah Millican. Each week the 1 hour show contains a mix of stand up comedy from the regular cast and a guest comedian. There is also a musical act that play numerous songs throughout the show.

== Episodes ==
No.	Comedian	Musical act	Transmission date
1	Wilson Dixon	Scouting for Girls	4 September 2010
2	Russell Kane	Athlete	11 September 2010
3	Mark Watson	Kid British	18 September 2010
4	Milton Jones	Goldheart Assembly	25 September 2010
5	Shappi Khorsandi	The Divine Comedy	2 October 2010
6	Jon Richardson	The Hoosiers	9 October 2010
