= Guest host =

Substitute host, usually of a talk show

A guest host (or guest presenter in the United Kingdom) is a person who temporarily hosts a television or radio program in place of its regular host. Guest hosts are commonly used when a regular host is ill, on leave or otherwise unavailable, and have also been used during transitions between permanent hosts.

Guest hosting was once particularly common on American late-night television. It could also serve as an opportunity for prospective hosts to gain experience and exposure; several prominent talk-show hosts, including David Letterman, Joan Rivers and Jay Leno, appeared as guest hosts before receiving programs of their own.

== History ==
=== The Tonight Show ===
Although guest hosting predated Johnny Carson's tenure on The Tonight Show, the practice became closely associated with the program during Carson's 30 years as host from 1962 to 1992. During the 1960s and 1970s, the show used numerous substitute hosts, some for a single episode and others for a week at a time. Recurring guest hosts included David Letterman, David Brenner, Joey Bishop and John Denver.

After Carson negotiated a reduced schedule with NBC, guest hosts became a regular part of the program. The show eventually used permanent guest hosts who were contracted to substitute for Carson regularly. Joan Rivers, Garry Shandling and Jay Leno successively held the role. Rivers later left NBC to host The Late Show Starring Joan Rivers on Fox, while Leno ultimately succeeded Carson as host of The Tonight Show with Jay Leno in 1992.

Other Carson-era guest hosts also went on to host talk shows of their own. Letterman became host of Late Night with David Letterman, Bishop hosted The Joey Bishop Show on ABC, and Brenner hosted the syndicated Nightlife. Carson himself had previously substituted for Jack Paar on Tonight Starring Jack Paar.

Guest hosting became much less common on The Tonight Show after Carson's retirement. During Leno's tenure, Katie Couric hosted one episode in 2003 as part of an on-air job swap in which Leno hosted Today. On April 1, 2022, Jimmy Kimmel hosted The Tonight Show Starring Jimmy Fallon while Jimmy Fallon simultaneously hosted Jimmy Kimmel Live! as an April Fools' Day prank.

=== The Late Show with David Letterman ===
Late Show with David Letterman used guest hosts during several absences by David Letterman. When Letterman underwent heart surgery in 2000, a series of substitutes hosted while he recovered. The program again relied on guest hosts when Letterman was absent with shingles in 2003. Hosts during that period included Bruce Willis, John McEnroe, Regis Philbin, Whoopi Goldberg, Vince Vaughn, Elvis Costello, Will Ferrell, Megan Mullally, Brad Garrett, Bonnie Hunt, Paul Shaffer, Bill Cosby and Luke Wilson.

The show experimented with regularly scheduled Friday guest hosts in June 2003, using Tom Arnold, Tom Green, Kelsey Grammer and Jimmy Fallon. The experiment was discontinued after a month. Fallon, then a cast member of Saturday Night Live, later became host of Late Night with Jimmy Fallon and The Tonight Show Starring Jimmy Fallon. Letterman's program also occasionally used guest hosts when he was unavailable later in its run.

=== The View ===
The View has frequently used guest co-hosts, particularly during periods between the departures and arrivals of permanent panelists. Celebrities appeared alongside the regular panel during the periods between the tenures of Debbie Matenopoulos, Lisa Ling and Elisabeth Hasselbeck. The program again used guest co-hosts after Star Jones left in 2006 and Rosie O'Donnell departed in 2007, before Whoopi Goldberg and Sherri Shepherd joined the panel. Guest co-hosts were also used during Hasselbeck's maternity leave in 2009.

=== Jeopardy! ===
Following the death of longtime host Alex Trebek in November 2020, Jeopardy! used a series of guest hosts while searching for a permanent successor. Former champion Ken Jennings was the first, followed by executive producer Mike Richards. Other guest hosts included Katie Couric, Aaron Rodgers, Bill Whitaker, Mehmet Oz, Anderson Cooper, Mayim Bialik, Savannah Guthrie, Sanjay Gupta, George Stephanopoulos, Robin Roberts, LeVar Burton, David Faber and Joe Buck. Former champion Buzzy Cohen hosted the 2021 Tournament of Champions.

Richards was initially selected to become the permanent host of the syndicated program, while Bialik was selected to host primetime editions, but Richards stepped down shortly afterward. Bialik and Jennings subsequently shared hosting duties, with Jennings later becoming the program's sole regular host.

=== Jimmy Kimmel Live! ===
Jimmy Kimmel Live! has regularly used guest hosts when Jimmy Kimmel has taken time away from the program. In 2017, Will Arnett, Anthony Anderson, Kristen Bell and David Spade filled in during a week of paternity leave for Kimmel. Later that year, Shaquille O'Neal, Dave Grohl, Channing Tatum and Jennifer Lawrence guest hosted while Kimmel was away with his family. Chris Pratt, Tracee Ellis Ross, Neil Patrick Harris and Melissa McCarthy filled in during another absence in December.

Kimmel began taking an extended summer break from the program in 2020, with guest hosts presenting the show during portions of his absence. The practice subsequently became a recurring part of the program's summer schedule. Guest hosts have included Anderson, Chelsea Handler, Martin Short, Kathryn Hahn, Kumail Nanjiani, Lamorne Morris, Jeff Goldblum, RuPaul, Ryan Reynolds and Hugh Jackman. In 2024, Short began that year's summer rotation with a week as host.

In 2026, Tiffany Haddish, Anderson, Ike Barinholtz, Colman Domingo and Jelly Roll were announced as the summer guest hosts. Rosie O'Donnell also guest hosted later that summer.

On April 1, 2022, Fallon guest hosted Jimmy Kimmel Live! while Kimmel hosted The Tonight Show as an April Fools' Day prank.

=== Other guest host examples ===
- Saturday Night Live uses a different celebrity host for most episodes, making the guest host part of the program's regular format.
- The Ellen DeGeneres Show increasingly used guest hosts during its later seasons. The show's DJ and executive producer Stephen "tWitch" Boss was among its recurring substitutes.
- Live with Kelly and Mark and its predecessor programs have regularly used guest co-hosts when one of the regular presenters is absent. Mark Consuelos frequently substituted before becoming Kelly Ripa's permanent co-host in 2023.
- Later used a "guest host of the week" format for two years after Greg Kinnear left the program in 1996, before Cynthia Garrett became its permanent host in 1998.
- The Late Show Starring Joan Rivers used a succession of guest hosts after Joan Rivers was fired by Fox. Arsenio Hall became one of the most prominent and was offered an opportunity to remain with Fox; he later hosted the syndicated The Arsenio Hall Show.
- The Late Late Show used rotating guest hosts between Craig Kilborn's departure and the selection of Craig Ferguson in 2004. The format was used again between Ferguson's departure and James Corden's debut in 2015, and guest hosts substituted for Corden during an absence in December 2019.
- The Rosie O'Donnell Show used Caroline Rhea as a recurring substitute during its later years. Rhea hosted the Friday edition during the show's final season and subsequently received her own syndicated talk show.
- The Kelly Clarkson Show used guest hosts when Kelly Clarkson was unavailable, including Jay Leno. A number of scheduled guests unexpectedly took over hosting duties during Clarkson's absences in early 2025.
- The Wendy Williams Show used guest hosts during several periods when Wendy Williams was unable to present the program. Jerry O'Connell was among the recurring substitutes, while Sherri Shepherd became the program's principal guest host during its final season. After the series ended in 2022, Shepherd began hosting her own syndicated program, Sherri, in the same time slot.
- The Daily Show used a rotating series of guest hosts following Trevor Noah's departure in December 2022. They included Leslie Jones, Wanda Sykes, D. L. Hughley, Chelsea Handler, Sarah Silverman, Al Franken, John Leguizamo, Hasan Minhaj, Kal Penn and Marlon Wayans. In 2024, former host Jon Stewart returned to host the Monday edition, while the show's correspondents presented other nights.
- Today with Jenna & Friends used a rotating guest co-host format with Jenna Bush Hager throughout 2025 following Hoda Kotb's departure from Today. The program used approximately 60 guest co-hosts before Sheinelle Jones was selected as Hager's permanent co-host, beginning in January 2026.

=== United Kingdom ===
In the United Kingdom, some programs have made guest presenters part of their regular format. Have I Got News for You has used a different guest presenter for each episode since Angus Deayton's departure in 2002. The Jack Docherty Show frequently used substitutes during Jack Docherty's absences in the late 1990s, with such editions billed as Not the Jack Docherty Show. After Simon Amstell left Never Mind the Buzzcocks, the program used a succession of guest hosts until 2013.

=== Other uses ===
- The frequency of guest presenters has been parodied by the Onion News Network through its fictional presenter Clifford Banes, who is repeatedly replaced by guest presenters for increasingly improbable reasons.
- The premise of the ESPN Classic series Cheap Seats has Randy and Jason Sklar serving as substitute hosts after the fictional regular host Ron Parker, played by Michael Showalter, is injured. The program was consequently titled Cheap Seats: Without Ron Parker.
- Daytime talk shows have also used celebrity guest co-hosts alongside their regular presenters. The Mike Douglas Show, for example, regularly featured a celebrity co-host for a week.
- WWE used celebrity guest hosts as on-screen authority figures on WWE Raw in 2009 and 2010.
- Mike Greenberg's ESPN Radio program Greeny increasingly used substitute hosts as Greenberg's television commitments expanded. The program ended with Greenberg's final appearance on January 27, 2025, and Clinton Yates subsequently took over the time slot.

== See also ==
- Cameo appearance
- Guest appearance
