= Guest appearance =

Participation of an outsider performer in an event or a medium

In the performing arts, a guest appearance is the participation of a performer in a production who is not part of the recurring performance group. Guest appearances are typically limited to a single episode or short narrative arc of a serial, or one segment of a single performance.

Those performers are guest artists, featured artists, guest stars, or guest fighters, and are typically already known to the audience for previous work. A guest appearance is distinguished from a cameo appearance by having a more substantive role.

== By medium ==
=== Show business ===
In show business, a guest appearance is the participation of an outsider performer in an event such as a music record, concert or show when the performer does not belong to the regular troupe. In music, such an outside performer is often referred to as a guest artist.

=== Classical performance arts and contemporary music ===
Guest appearances in theatre, ballet, and classical music have been aided by the advent of air transport. In classical music, guest orchestra conductors are common.

In the early days of the pop music industry, while guests were not uncommon, they were seldom given credits on bands' album covers. For example, Eric Clapton was not credited in print for his guitar performance in the release of "While My Guitar Gently Weeps" of The Beatles. Gradually guest appearances have become a fully credited staple of music industry. The custom of guest appearance has become especially prominent in rap music, and this influenced rock musicians. The guests are often referred to as featured artists or featured guests. Such a performer may be annotated in credits or even in song titles by the abbreviation feat. or further abbreviation ft.; or by the word with or abbreviation w/.

=== TV series and video games ===
In a TV series, a guest star is an actor who appears in one or a few episodes (sometimes a story arc). In some cases a guest star may play an important recurring character and may appear many times in a series, despite not being a member of the main cast; they may ultimately be asked to join the main cast if their role continues. A special guest star in television is typically a celebrity guest, but it is also occasionally used for a regular cast member—usually for an actor or actress who is featured heavily but joined the show after the rest of the cast was signed.

In video games, the term denotes a playable character whose inclusion in that video game's roster does not follow the template set by the majority of the other characters (for non-playable characters this applies to, see Cameo appearance). The premise of a playable character straying from a general theme may, for example, include the introduction of real-life personalities to a roster of fictional characters or the blending of characters originating from a different series, franchise or medium entirely (see crossovers in video games). In the case of specific crossovers already being the main theme, guest characters may be those who do not fit within that theme.

== Reasons for guest appearances ==
The inclusion of stars, particularly those from older generations near the end of their career arcs, may bring benefits to the stars themselves. In rap, mutual and multiple guest starring was recognized as a way to diversify the performance.

In theatre and ballet, guest appearances diversify actors' repertory and experience under different choreographers, and give more acting opportunities. Even for established stars, prestigious overseas engagements increase their home status. Conversely, a guest star benefits the receiving troupe, bringing new inspiration and technique. Audience would welcome diversity, and theatrical business benefits as well: theatre connoisseurs will come to see the same piece with a new star.

== Drawbacks ==
Commercialization of guests policy may also have negative consequences. Local theatres may limit the growth opportunities for their performers in favor of guests. Sometimes rehearsal times are inadequate to fully integrate the home and guest styles. Touring increases physical load on an actor. It is also associated with multiple stress factors: from jet lags to close calls due to unanticipated travel delays.

With a television series, the appearance of a special guest star, or depending on an overabundance of guest star appearances to the frustration and demerit of the regular cast of the series, could mark the moment when a series "jumps the shark"; that is, a doomed attempt to reverse a decline in popularity.

== See also ==
- Cameo appearance
- Guest character
- Guest host
