= Jess Phillips =

British politician (born 1981)

Jess Phillips MP
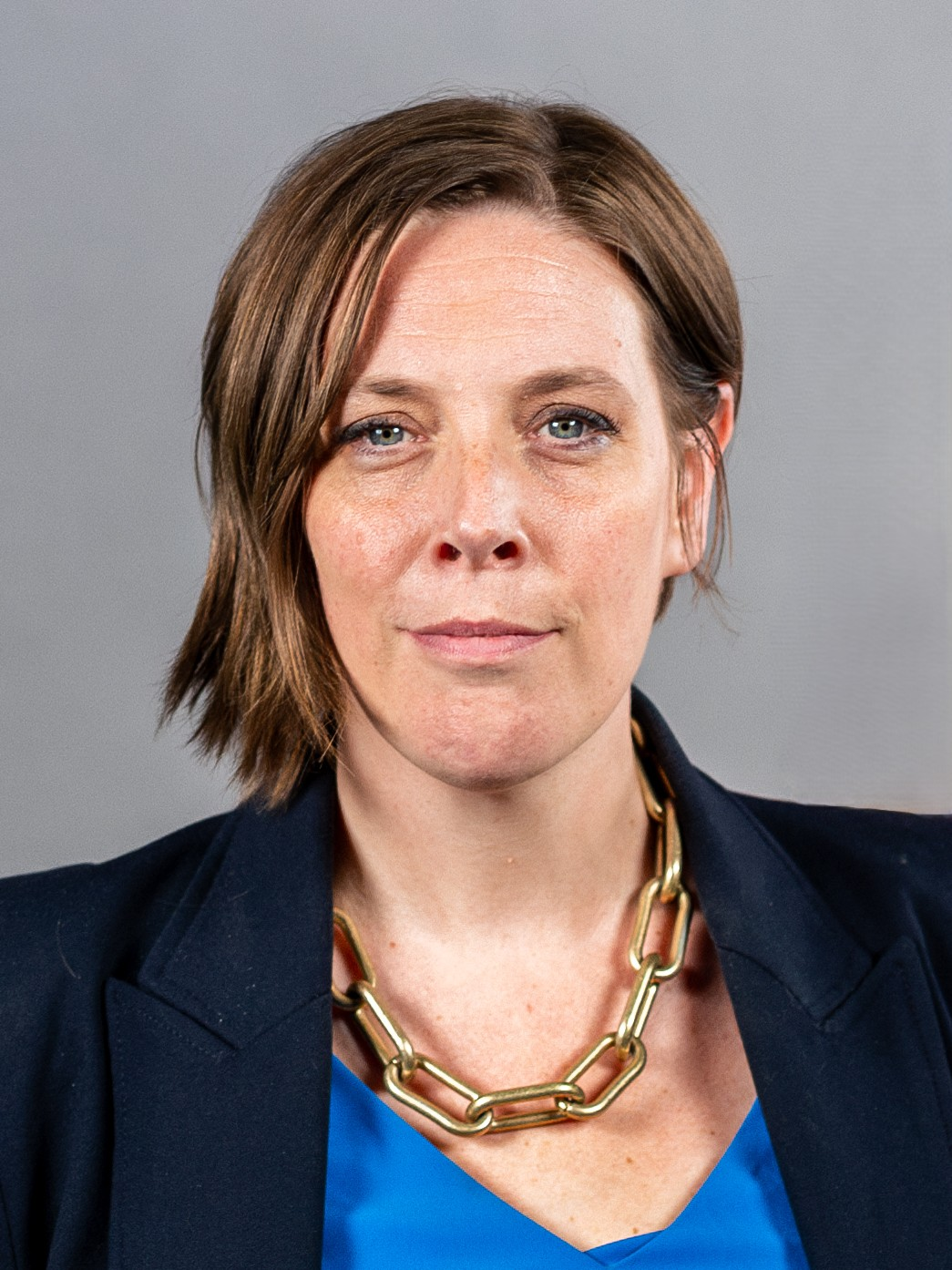
- Official portrait, 2024

Parliamentary Under-Secretary of State for Safeguarding and Violence Against Women and Girls
- In office 9 July 2024 – 12 May 2026
- Prime Minister: Keir Starmer
- Preceded by: Laura Farris
- Succeeded by: Natalie Fleet

Member of Parliament for Birmingham Yardley
- Incumbent
- Assumed office 7 May 2015
- Preceded by: John Hemming
- Majority: 693 (1.9%)
Shadow portfolios
Shadow Minister for Domestic Violence and Safeguarding
In office 10 April 2020 – 15 November 2023
Leader	Keir Starmer
Preceded by	Carolyn Harris (2017)
Succeeded by	Alex Davies-Jones

Personal details
- Born: Jessica Rose Trainor; 9 October 1981 (age 45) Birmingham, West Midlands, England
- Party: Labour
- Spouse: Tom Phillips (m. 2006)
- Children: 2
- Education: University of Leeds (BA)
- Website: jessphillips.net

Jessica Rose Phillips (née Trainor; born 9 October 1981) is a British politician who has been the Member of Parliament (MP) for Birmingham Yardley since 2015. A member of the Labour Party, she served as Parliamentary Under-Secretary of State for Safeguarding and Violence Against Women and Girls from July 2024 to May 2026.

Phillips was appointed as Parliamentary Private Secretary (PPS) to Lucy Powell, the Shadow Education Secretary, in 2015. A vocal critic of the former Leader of the Labour Party Jeremy Corbyn, Phillips resigned as a PPS in protest over Corbyn's leadership and said she would "find it incredibly difficult" to continue as an MP if Corbyn were re-elected as Labour leader. She supported Owen Smith in the failed attempt to replace Corbyn in the 2016 leadership election. Phillips was a candidate for Labour leader in the 2020 leadership election, but withdrew early in the contest.

== Early life and career ==
Jessica Phillips was born on 9 October 1981 in Birmingham. The youngest of four children, Phillips is the daughter of Stewart Trainor, a teacher, and Jean Trainor (née Mackay), an NHS administrator who rose to become deputy chief executive of the NHS Confederation and chair of South Birmingham Mental Health Trust. They were politically active; in March 2016, she told Rachel Cooke of The Observer: "Growing up with my father was like growing up with Jeremy Corbyn." Phillips grew up in Kings Heath. Her mother also worked for the RSPCA.

Phillips went to King Edward VI Camp Hill School for Girls, a local grammar school. Her childhood ambition was to become Prime Minister.

Phillips studied economic and social history and social policy at the University of Leeds from 2000 to 2003. She has said she marched in protest against the Iraq War. From 2011 to 2013, she studied for a postgraduate diploma in public sector management at the University of Birmingham.

Phillips worked for a period for her parents at their company, Healthlinks Event Management Services. From 2010 onwards, Phillips worked for the Women's Aid Federation of England as a business development manager, responsible for managing refuges for victims of domestic abuse in Sandwell in the West Midlands.

Phillips left the Labour Party during the years of Tony Blair's leadership, rejoining after the 2010 general election. Her period at Women's Aid as an administrator made Phillips "utterly pragmatic... I learned that my principles don't matter as much as people's lives." In the 2012 local elections, she was elected as a Labour councillor for the Longbridge ward, taking the seat from the Conservatives. She was then appointed as the victims' champion at Birmingham City Council, lobbying police and criminal justice organisations on behalf of victims. She also served on the West Midlands Police and Crime Panel.

== Parliamentary career ==
=== 1st term (2015–2017) ===
Phillips was selected from an all-women shortlist to contest Birmingham Yardley in June 2013, which was then represented by John Hemming of the Liberal Democrats. At the 2015 general election, Phillips was elected as Member of Parliament (MP) for Birmingham Yardley, winning with 41.5% of the vote and a majority of 6,595 votes. Her maiden speech concerned homelessness and "improving [Britain]'s response to victims of domestic and sexual violence and abuse in all its forms."

In the 2015 Labour leadership election, Phillips nominated Yvette Cooper for Labour leader and Tom Watson for deputy leader.

Phillips was appointed as the Parliamentary private secretary (PPS) to Lucy Powell, the Shadow Secretary of State for Education, in September 2015.

In June 2016, she resigned as PPS to Lucy Powell, following the resignation of Powell and other Shadow Cabinet members over the leadership of Corbyn. In July 2016, Phillips threatened to resign from the Labour Party and sit as an independent MP if Corbyn was re-elected as leader of the party, stating she would find it "incredibly difficult" to continue serving under Corbyn's leadership. She supported Owen Smith in the failed attempt to replace Corbyn in the 2016 Labour leadership election.

In September 2016, she was elected chair of the Women's Parliamentary Labour Party (WPLP), defeating her predecessor Dawn Butler, considered a Corbyn ally.

=== 2nd term (2017–2019) ===
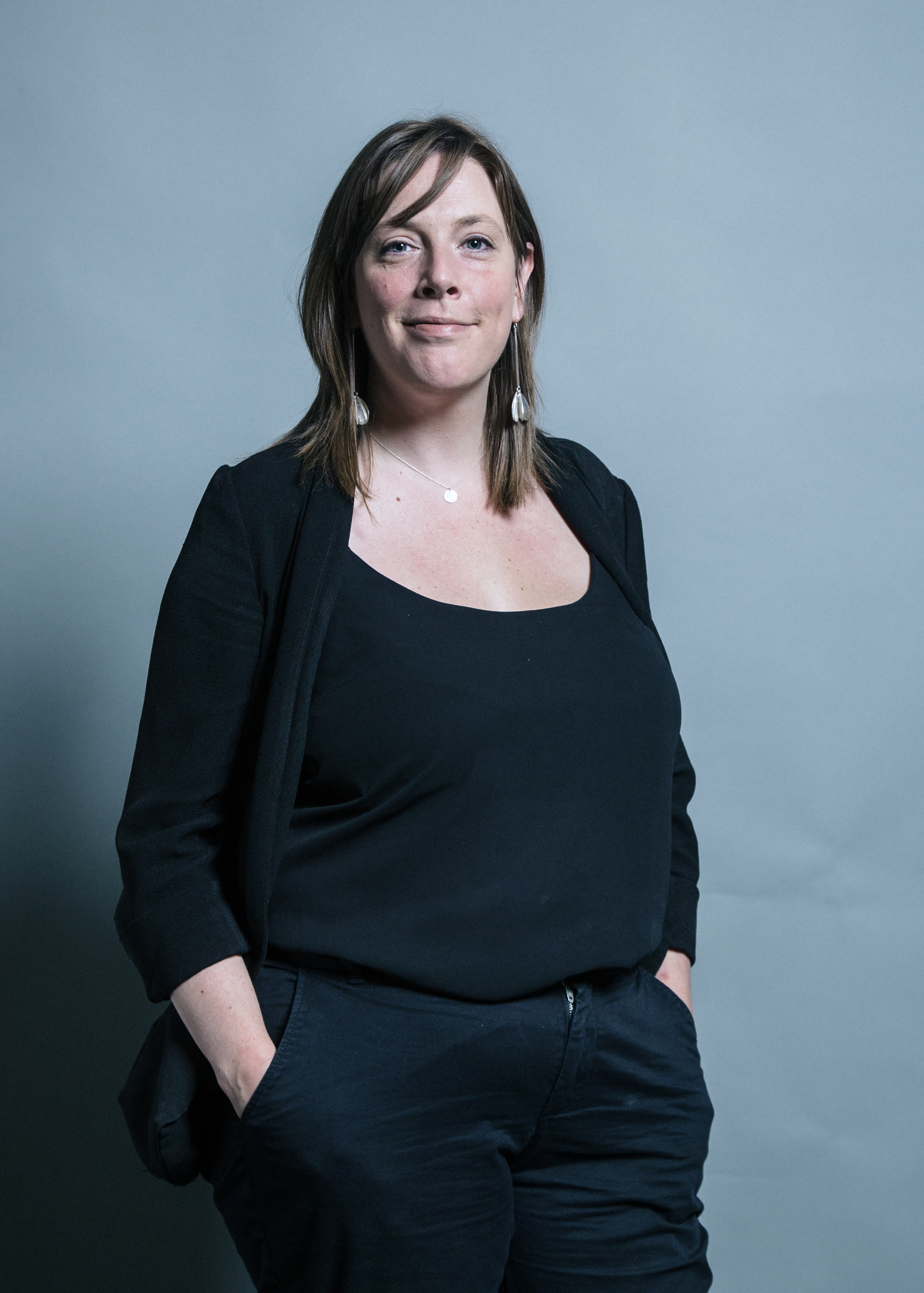
Official portrait, 2017

Phillips criticised the calling of the 2017 snap election. She was reselected as the Labour candidate for Birmingham Yardley, while her predecessor as MP for the seat John Hemming was reselected by the Liberal Democrats, in what was reported as a "grudge match". At the snap 2017 general election, Phillips was re-elected as MP for Birmingham Yardley with an increased vote share of 57.1% and an increased majority of 16,574 votes. Upon her victory, she continued her criticisms of Hemming.

Following the general election, Phillips said the Women's PLP would co-ordinate to promote policies beneficial to women in the context of a hung parliament.

In July 2017, Phillips called for a review into elections for chairs of House of Commons select committees due to the relatively low number of female candidates.

In March 2018, Phillips again threatened to resign from the Labour Party, this time in response to Labour's handling of sexual harassment allegations against Labour MP Kelvin Hopkins, stating that she would "cut up her membership card" if the alleged victim was questioned by Hopkins as part of the investigation.

In July 2018, it was reported that Phillips served as deputy editor of The House, the in-house Parliamentary magazine published by the Dods Group, which had been purchased by Conservative Party donor and former vice-chairman Michael Ashcroft, earning an annual salary of £8,000 for two hours' work per month.

In March 2019, she said: "I think I'd be a good prime minister" and that "I feel like I can't leave the Labour Party without rolling the dice one more time. I owe it that. But it doesn't own me. It's nothing more than a logo if it doesn't stand for something that I actually care about – it's just a f***ing rose."

Phillips also said in March 2019 that she would "leave her son on the steps of Downing Street" after it was announced that her son's school would finish earlier on a Friday due to budget cuts.

In 2019, a controversy emerged as local Muslim parents in Saltley, associated with the Parkfield Community School, objected to lessons on relationships and inclusivity (including but not limited to teaching acceptance of LGBT people) being taught to their primary school children as part of Andrew Moffat's "No Outsiders" programme, on the grounds that LGBT relationships were immoral: one campaigner stated that they saw homosexual relationships as an invalid sexual relationship to have, while others misunderstood the lessons to be teaching children about gay sex. Phillips spoke out publicly against the objecting parents, saying she felt "bereft about this" and that the material being used in the school to teach was not, in her view, "inappropriate". Phillips called for an exclusion zone to prevent protests outside Anderton Park Primary School in Balsall Heath against lessons on inclusivity.

=== 3rd term (2019–2024) ===
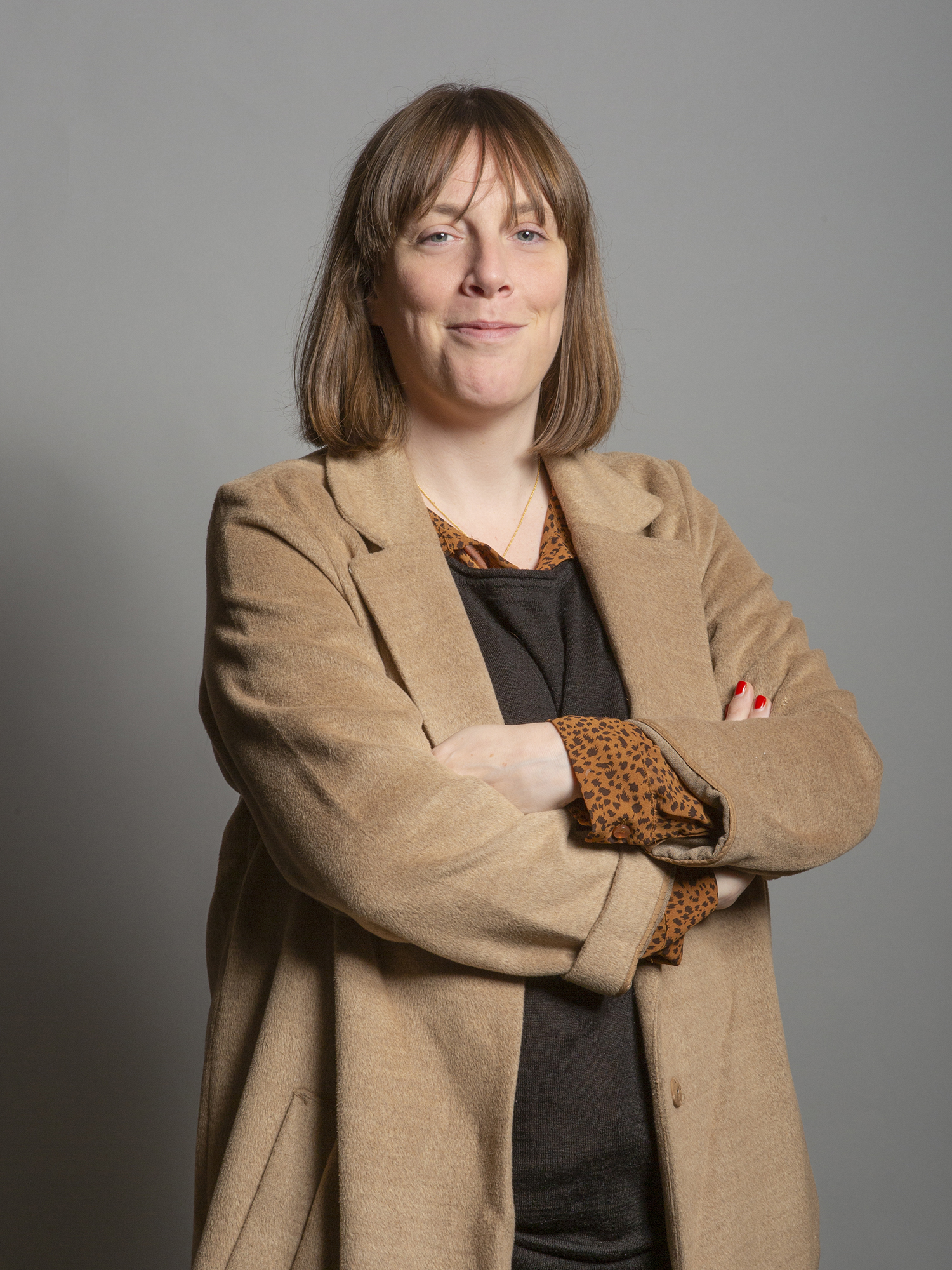
Official portrait, 2019

In October 2019, Phillips said she thought Labour was unlikely to win a majority in a general election. She said if Labour was not elected the biggest party, Corbyn should resign as party leader, whereupon she might stand for the position. In November 2019, it was announced Phillips was re-selected for the Labour Party in Birmingham Yardley. She was again re-elected at the 2019 general election, with a slightly decreased vote share of 54.8% and a decreased majority of 10,659.

During the years 2020 to 2022, Phillips received the second highest income on top of her MP's salary amongst Labour Party MPs, mainly from writing and broadcasting work.

==== Leadership bid ====
Following Corbyn's decision to step down as Labour leader after the party's defeat in the general election, Phillips was suggested as a potential successor. The first poll of Labour members suggested she could secure 12% of first-preference votes in a leadership competition, putting her third behind Sir Keir Starmer and Rebecca Long-Bailey.

Phillips announced her bid for the leadership on 3 January 2020 in Grimsby, a seat the Conservative party had gained from Labour in the election. She was the third candidate to announce, following Emily Thornberry and Clive Lewis. Phillips acknowledged her performance in the first candidate hustings was poor, writing "I was awful because I was trying to hit a million different lines and messages in 40 seconds." She dropped out of the leadership election campaign on 21 January, during the second stage of obtaining nominations from trade unions, affiliate bodies and local parties and subsequently announced her support for Lisa Nandy.

==== Appointment to the Shadow Frontbench ====
Phillips was appointed by Keir Starmer to serve as Shadow Minister for Domestic Violence and Safeguarding, a position in the Shadow Home Office, on 9 April 2020. It was the first time she had served on the shadow frontbench.

She resigned from her position following a vote on a ceasefire in the Gaza war on 15 November 2023. In her resignation letter, Phillips said the decision to resign was with a heavy heart, adding that "I can see no route where the current military action does anything but put at risk the hope of peace and security for anyone in the region now and in the future."

==== Parliamentary Standards ====
In May 2022, Phillips narrowly avoided being referred to the Parliamentary Committee on Standards after being investigated by the Commissioner for Standards for repeatedly failing to register interests within the required timescale. She accepted that she had breached the rules, and the matter was resolved through the rectification process.

=== 4th term (2024–) ===
Phillips was again re-elected at the 2024 general election with a greatly decreased vote share of 31.2% and a decreased majority of only 693. She described it as the 'worst election I have ever stood in'.

On 9 July 2024, she was appointed a Parliamentary Under-Secretary of State for Safeguarding and Violence Against Women and Girls, which she said was with responsibility for safeguarding and violence against women and girls.

On 12 May 2026, amid growing calls for the resignation of Prime Minister Keir Starmer following landslide local‑election losses of more than 1,400 Labour seats, Phillips submitted her letter of resignation from the role of Safeguarding Minister.

== Political views ==
=== Party issues ===
Phillips verbally clashed with fellow Labour MP Diane Abbott on 14 September 2015 over the gender composition of Jeremy Corbyn's first Shadow Cabinet. After she asked Corbyn why he had failed to appoint a woman to shadow the great offices of state, Abbott accused her of being "sanctimonious" and said that Phillips was "not the only feminist in the PLP [Parliamentary Labour Party]". Corbyn did not intervene. Owen Bennett wrote in The Huffington Post that Phillips recounted: "I roundly told her to fuck off." When asked what Abbott did after that suggestion, Phillips replied: "She fucked off." According to Abbott in a January 2018 Guardian interview: "Jess Phillips never told me to fuck off. What was extraordinary is that she made a big deal of telling people she had." Phillips later apologised.

Phillips told Owen Jones in December 2015 that she had told Corbyn and his staff "to their faces: 'The day that ... you are hurting us more than you are helping us, I won't knife you in the back, I'll knife you in the front'", if it looked as though he was damaging Labour's chances of winning the next general election. Responding to criticism about her use of language, Phillips said on Twitter: "I am no more going to actually knife Jeremy Corbyn than I am actually a breath of fresh air, or a pain in the arse."

Phillips is a supporter of Labour Friends of Israel.

=== Sex and gender equality ===
In October 2015, Phillips was criticised on social media after she mocked the Conservative MP Philip Davies for trying to get a debate about International Men's Day. He cited men's issues like increasing male suicides, lower life expectancy relative to women, male victims of domestic violence, low educational achievement by working-class white boys and male experience of child custody cases. Phillips openly laughed and pulled faces while Davies spoke, and then stated that: "You'll have to excuse me for laughing. As the only woman on this committee, it seems like every day to me is International Men's Day." Davies responded by stating that, "If a male MP had reacted in that way about the need for debate on International Women's Day, there would have been hell to pay. It's entirely possible you'd be removed from Chambers or have the Whip removed. I'm surprised she finds that a laughing matter." Colleagues from both leading parties agreed with Davies, and permission for a debate in Westminster Hall on the matter was eventually granted. She wrote in The Independent: "I commend Philip Davies for changing the thrust of the debate to focus on male suicide – but in and of itself this day serves no useful function".

In January 2016, Phillips said on Question Time that events akin to the mass sexual assaults in Cologne happened every week on Birmingham's Broad Street. She insisted any "patriarchal culture" must be challenged, but the UK should not "rest on its laurels" when two women are murdered every week. In response to criticism she told the Birmingham Mail: "This isn't something that refugees have brought into our country. This is something that's always existed". Journalist Joan Smith criticised these remarks and asked Phillips to admit she was wrong.

Phillips criticised the gender makeup of Labour's Shadow Cabinet reshuffle in January 2016.

Phillips has commented that the "British Pakistani-Bangladeshi community" have "issues about women's roles in a family, in society" and were importing "wives for their disabled sons".

In March 2021, following the murder of Sarah Everard, Phillips read out the names of all women killed in the previous year where a man was subsequently convicted. She said "killed women are not vanishingly rare, killed women are common". She has continued to do this each year.

=== Transgender issues ===
Philips' interpretation of feminism has also been accused of excluding trans communities, though this characterisation is disputed, and some feminist organisations have raised concerns over her support for the Nordic model for sex work.

In 2020, Philips stated that she considers trans women to be women and in regards to her experience running a women's domestic and sexual violence service, that "We had a small number of trans women in my time there and they did not pose a risk". However, in 2024, Philips stated that while she "is happy to refer to trans women as women", she believes that they should not be allowed into spaces such as women's rape crisis refuges and prisons, and should instead have their own separate facilities.

=== Inquiry into Oldham child sexual exploitation scandal ===
In October 2024, Phillips rejected Oldham Council's request for an independent public inquiry into historic child abuse by grooming gangs, favouring a locally-run inquiry instead, based on similar approaches in other areas. In January 2025, the decision was criticised by the leader of the opposition, Kemi Badenoch, saying that a national inquiry was "long overdue". Elon Musk posted on X that the decision was "disgraceful" and that she "deserves to be in prison", suggesting the rejection was to shield prime minister Keir Starmer from blame, since he had led the Crown Prosecution Service when the abuse occurred. Musk further described Phillips as a "rape genocide apologist".

In support of Phillips, health secretary Wes Streeting described Musk's comments as "a disgraceful smear", while Starmer accused politicians and activists of "spreading lies and misinformation" over grooming gangs. A group of victims of gender-based violence, including three survivors of the Telford sexual abuse scandal, also criticised Musk and said of Phillips, "[There is] no one in public life who has done more to support victims and survivors and to advocate for their interests". Phillips told Newsnight that Musk's "disinformation" was endangering her, and told Sky News that the previous Conservative government, of which Badenoch was a part, had also supported a local inquiry in Oldham.

=== Online and email abuse ===
Phillips is frequently targeted for abuse by anonymous users on social media. In 2015, she was subjected to rape threats on social media following her objections to International Men's Day. In May 2016, after campaigning against online bullying, Phillips said she received thousands of threatening or demeaning tweets within a 36-hour period, including allusions to rape. After she complained to Twitter and was told the tweets did not break its rules, she accused the company of "colluding" with her abusers.

In response to the murder of Labour MP Jo Cox, in June 2016, Phillips stated that it "makes me want to fight harder". She wrote that they both regularly received online abuse and threats. In August 2016, she told The World at One on Radio 4 that a "panic room" was being installed in her constituency office which now has an alarm system, and that improved locks have been fitted at her home.

In an interview with Stylist, published in October 2019, Phillips said of the hate she had experienced, "Fear and hatred can be the things that drive you. I don't always think of fear as a bad thing, it gives you fight-or-flight".

In February 2025, a man was jailed for 28 weeks and made subject to a five-year restraining order, after pleading guilty to sending malicious emails to Phillips, Sadiq Khan, and a senior officer in the Metropolitan police.

== Personal life ==
Phillips lives in Moseley and is married to Tom Phillips; the couple have two sons. Phillips employed her husband, previously a lift engineer, as constituency support manager until February 2019.

In 2021, Phillips said that she had the human papillomavirus in her 20s. During a March 2022 debate on making a pandemic rule allowing at-home abortions permanent, Phillips spoke in favour and stated that she had also undergone an abortion years earlier.

Phillips has appeared as a guest on the BBC satirical news show Have I Got News for You in June 2016, November 2016, May 2018, May 2019, May 2022, October 2022 and May 2024. On 10 December 2021, she presented an episode of the show.

== Bibliography ==
Title	Published	Publisher	Note	Source
Everywoman, One Woman's Truth About Speaking the Truth	23 February 2017	Penguin Books	In May 2019, the book was optioned to be adapted as a television drama by RED Production Company.	
Truth to Power: 7 Ways to Call Time on B.S.	3 October 2019	Octopus		
The Life of an MP: Everything You Really Need to Know about Politics	5 April 2022	Gallery UK		
Let's Be Honest: Truth, Lies and Politics	31 July 2025	Simon & Schuster UK		

== Filmography ==
Show	Date of broadcast	Episode	Role	Source
Have I Got News for You	3 June 2016	Series 51, Episode 9	Panellist	
Have I Got News for You	25 November 2016	Series 52, Episode 7	Panellist	
Have I Got News for You	11 May 2018	Series 55, Episode 6	Panellist	
Have I Got News for You	24 May 2019	Series 57, Episode 8	Panellist	
Have I Got News for You	10 December 2021	Series 62, Episode 9	Host	
Have I Got News for You	20 May 2022	Series 63, Episode 8	Panellist	
Have I Got News for You	14 October 2022	Series 64, Episode 4	Panellist	
Have I Got News for You	17 May 2024	Series 67, Episode 7	Panellist	

Parliament of the United Kingdom
Preceded by John Hemming	Member of Parliament for Birmingham Yardley; 2015–present	Incumbent
Political offices
Preceded by Carolyn Harris	Shadow Minister for Domestic Violence and Safeguarding; 2020–2023	Succeeded by Alex Davies-Jones
Preceded by Laura Farris	Parliamentary Under-Secretary of State for Safeguarding and Violence Against Women and Girls; 2024–present	Incumbent
