= Rhod Gilbert =

Welsh comedian (born 1968)

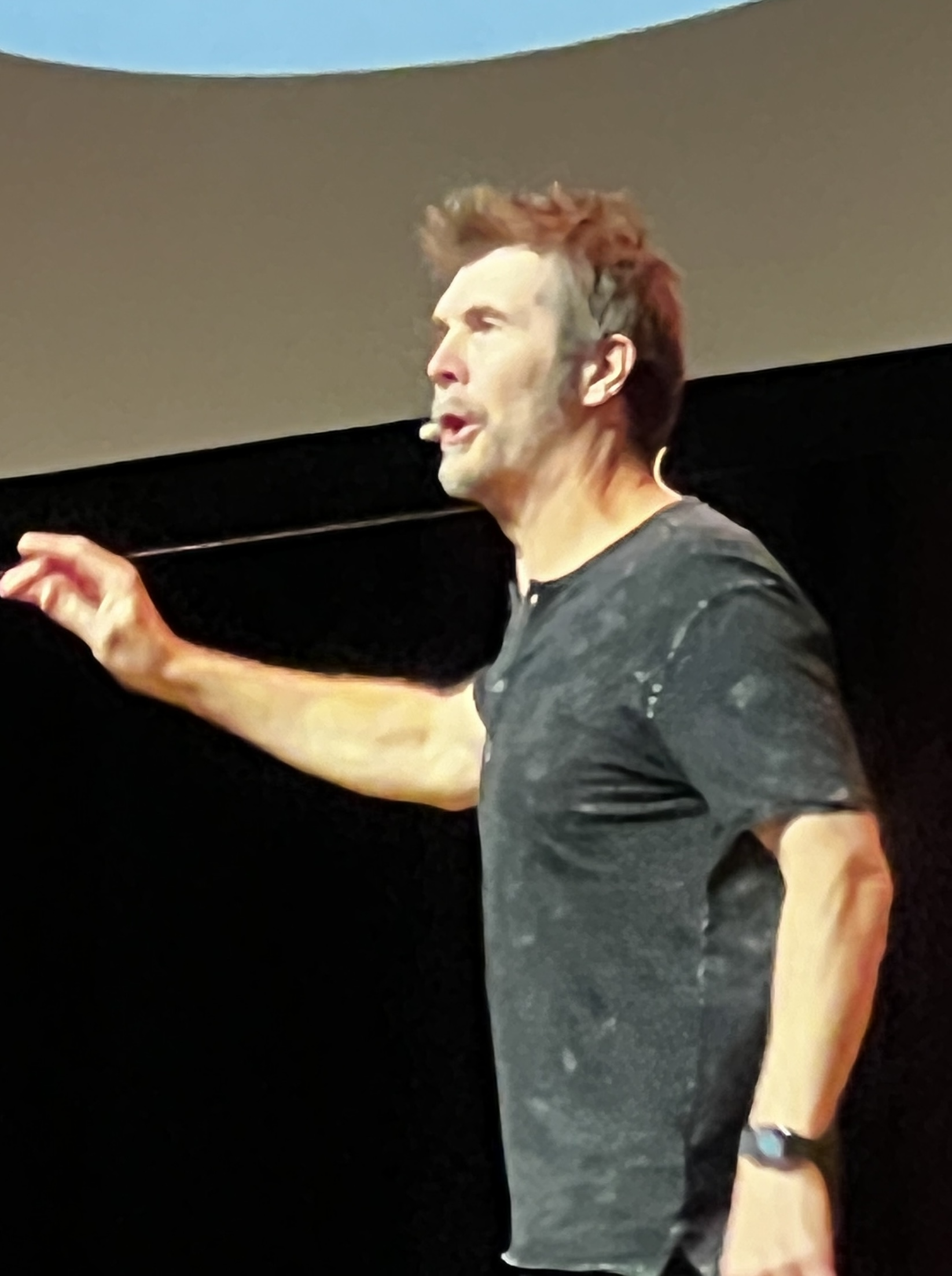
- Gilbert in 2024
- Born: Rhodri Paul Gilbert; 18 October 1968 (age 57); Carmarthen, Wales
- Education: University of Exeter (BA)
- Notable work: Never Mind the Buzzcocks; Walk on the Wild Side; Live at the Apollo; Rhod Gilbert's Work Experience; The Apprentice: You're Fired!
- Spouse: Sian Harries (m. 2013)

Comedy career
- Years active: 2002–present
- Medium: Stand-up, television, radio
- Genres: Observational comedy, deadpan
- Subject: Everyday life
- Website: rhodgilbertcomedian.com

Rhodri Paul Gilbert (born 18 October 1968) is a Welsh comedian and television and radio presenter who was nominated in 2005 for the Perrier Best Newcomer Award. In 2008, he was nominated for the main comedy award (as the Edinburgh Comedy Awards were then branded).

Gilbert appears on television and radio panel shows, has performed stand-up on the Royal Variety Performance, and hosted a weekly show on BBC Radio Wales.

In September 2014, Gilbert started presenting the BBC Two panel show Never Mind the Buzzcocks, ending a run of five series without a permanent host.

== Early life ==
Gilbert was born in Carmarthen, Wales on 18 October 1968, as one of three siblings to two teacher parents. His father came from Ebbw Vale and his mother from Abertillery. He attended Maridunum Comprehensive School and went on to study languages at Exeter University. For the first three weeks, his extreme shyness meant that Gilbert could not eat with other students in the dining hall or even make friends with the student in the next room.

After graduating, Gilbert travelled for a year and a half around Australia and Asia before returning to Carmarthen and working as an administrative assistant for the Welsh Office. He later worked as a qualitative researcher for several market research agencies in London.

== Career ==
=== Stand-up comedy ===
Gilbert got into professional comedy in 2002, after taking part in the Amused Moose Stand Up and Deliver course, but only "thanks to a girlfriend's constant nagging". Within 18 months, Gilbert had already won several different talent competitions and was nominated for the Perrier Newcomer award for his first solo show in 2005 at Edinburgh Fringe titled 1984. He has since performed worldwide.

Video of Gilbert on food from Wales

Many of Gilbert's stories are drawn from real life events, and his life in the wholly fictionalised village of Llanbobl. In 2008, Gilbert wrote a sitcom about life in Llanbobl, which featured on BBC Radio 2.

In his 2006 Edinburgh Fringe show Knocking on Heaven's Door, Gilbert told stories from his life, weighing up whether he would be admitted to heaven. His 2007 show, Who's Eaten Gilbert's Grape?, saw Gilbert return to Llanbobl and pick up the story following the 1984 show narrative. His 2008 show, Rhod Gilbert and the Award-Winning Mince Pie, saw Gilbert question his sanity, his career and his life after suffering a mental breakdown brought on by the award-winning mince pie at a motorway services.

On 17 December 2008, he appeared at the 80th Royal Variety Performance.

On 18 and 19 June 2009, Gilbert made the last performances of Rhod Gilbert and the Award-Winning Mince Pie show at the Bloomsbury Theatre, which was recorded and released as a DVD on 16 November 2009. The DVD also contains several special features, including his rant about lost luggage, outtakes from the performance, in which he chats with the audience and deals with hecklers and a mockumentary called Back to Llanbobl in which Gilbert shows the viewer around his fictional home town, filmed in Talgarth, Powys.

Gilbert's 2009/2010 show, Rhod Gilbert and the Cat That Looked Like Nicholas Lyndhurst previewed around the UK in small venues before being performed at the Edinburgh Festival. The show toured UK theatres from September 2009. The tour included dates at many prestigious theatres such as London's Hammersmith Apollo. A DVD of the tour was released on 15 November 2010.

=== Television ===
On BBC One, Gilbert has made a number of guest appearances on Would I Lie to You?. He has appeared five and three times respectively on the BBC Two panel shows QI and Mock the Week, and presented two episodes of Never Mind the Buzzcocks in October 2009 and December 2011 before becoming the permanent presenter for the final series of its original BBC run. He hosted three episodes of Have I Got News for You in April 2011, October 2017, and May 2018; has appeared as a guest on Channel 4's 8 Out of 10 Cats; and wrote and narrated BBC Three's 2007 Goals Galore, Pranks Galore, Football Gaffes Galore and TV Gaffes Galore programmes. He also presented BBC 2W's Rhod Gilbert's Teen Tribes, providing an insight into the worlds of "Emos", "Chavs" and "Goths".

Gilbert was Paramount Comedy's continuity writer and announcer between September 2004 and October 2005, providing end-credit voice-overs for their peak time programme schedule.

In December 2008, Gilbert was signed for a campaign to promote tourism in Wales and became the official Voice of Wales for the country's tourist board, fronting the 2009 Visit Wales television advertising.

Gilbert has reported for the BBC One current affairs/human interest show The One Show.

In November 2008, Gilbert appeared on the BBC's Live at the Apollo as a guest. In December 2009, he hosted the show, introducing fellow comedian John Bishop. On 6 June 2009 Gilbert appeared as the headline act on Michael McIntyre's Comedy Roadshow on BBC One, and as a guest on 8 out of 10 Cats on 17 July 2009. He also provided voiceover material for the sketch show Walk on the Wild Side.

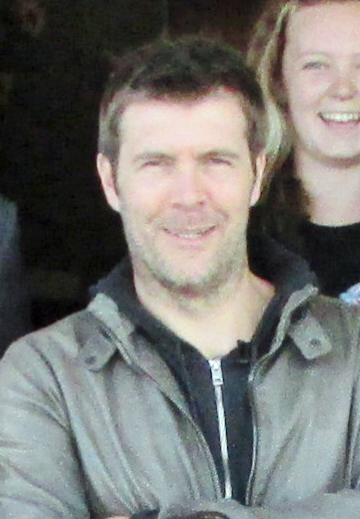
Gilbert in 2014

On 19 January 2010, Rhod Gilbert's Work Experience aired on BBC One Wales. Zipline Creative Limited worked freelance as producer/directors, editors and also camera and sound on the series for Presentable RDF. The four-part series saw Gilbert attempt a number of jobs including hairdresser, refuse collector, soldier and parent. Following the show's success on BBC One Wales, the series aired nationally on BBC2 from 10 March.

In August 2010, the BBC commissioned eight episodes of Ask Rhod Gilbert following a successful pilot earlier in 2010. The show featured Gilbert, Greg Davies and Lloyd Langford answering random trivia questions, such as 'Who would win in a race, Usain Bolt or a grizzly bear?', posed by the public and celebrities, with additional celebrity guests on the panel. The show ran for two series.

On 7 March 2011, series 2 of Rhod Gilbert's Work Experience began airing on BBC One Wales. In this series he tried out jobs as a farmer, butler, tattoo artist and firefighter. In January 2012, Gilbert began filming series 3 of the show. It aired on BBC One Wales from 7 May 2012 and saw him take on jobs such as primary school teacher, zookeeper, drag artist and police officer. A fourth series was broadcast in June–July 2013. This series, the jobs were wedding planner, scout leader, tour guide and male model. Series 5, which had four episodes, began on BBC One Wales in September 2014 and was repeated on BBC Two from February 2015. Series 6 was broadcast on BBC One Wales starting February 2016.

In September 2014, Gilbert started presenting the BBC Two panel show Never Mind the Buzzcocks, ending a run of five series without a permanent host. In May 2015, however, the BBC ended the show. The documentary Rhod Gilbert vs Kilimanjaro, chronicling the attempt to climb Mount Kilimanjaro for charity made by Gilbert and several fellow celebrities, was shown on the BBC in December 2014.

Gilbert appeared several times on the Channel 4 comedy/game show 8 Out of 10 Cats Does Countdown.

He replaced comedian Jack Dee as the host of The Apprentice: You're Fired! beginning in 2016. In 2019, he stepped down and was replaced by Tom Allen.

In September 2018, Gilbert appeared as a contestant of the seventh series of Taskmaster alongside James Acaster, Jessica Knappett, Kerry Godliman and Phil Wang.

In November 2021, Gilbert was a guest presenter for BBC's DIY SOS: Children in Need 2021.

In 2020, Gilbert became the presenter of Comedy Central's Rhod Gilbert's Growing Pains.

=== Radio ===
In 2006, Gilbert hosted the BBC Radio Wales comedy panel show Jest a Minute, live from The Comedy Store in London. The second series of Jest a Minute was recorded in late 2008 in Cardiff's Glee Club, hosted by Gilbert and featuring regular team captains Chris Corcoran and Lloyd Langford, and guests from the comedy circuit such as Elis James, Greg Davies, Lucy Porter and Jon Richardson. A third series was also broadcast.

Gilbert was also the host of BBC Radio 4's 4 Stands Up comedy series which aired in the Autumn of 2008 and has also appeared twice on Radio Four's Just a Minute, Radio 2's Does the Team Think?, and BBC Radio 4's Act Your Age.

In December 2008, a pilot of his sitcom Rhod Gilbert's Leaving Llanbobl was broadcast on BBC Radio 2; the sitcom was written by and starred Gilbert and Greg Davies, with additional writing by Sian Harries. Lloyd Langford played Gilbert's amiable younger brother Emrys; Di Botcher played Brenda, a gossipy hairdresser; and Mike Hayward played Gilbert's father Gurnos. The show was produced by Ed Morrish. Gilbert has hinted in interviews that the sitcom is likely to move to TV when it is completed as he found that he was "seeing it" as he wrote it.

Gilbert has also made several appearances on the BBC Radio 4 comedy programme The Unbelievable Truth.

In 2011, he recorded a radio show for BBC Radio 2 called Rhod Gilbert's Bulging Barrel of Laughs with comedians Lloyd Langford, Greg Davies and Sarah Millican. Each show also featured live music from bands such as Athlete, Scouting for Girls, Kid British and The Hoosiers. It has since been repeated on BBC Radio 4 Extra.

From 2006 to 2019, Gilbert also fronted his own radio show, The Rhod Gilbert Radio Show, broadcast by BBC Radio Wales on Saturdays between 11:30 am and 1:30 pm, often co-hosted by fellow Welsh Comedians Bennett Arron, Lloyd Langford or Chris Corcoran.

== Personal life ==
Gilbert married his long-term girlfriend, writer and comedian Sian Harries, in August 2013. They divide their time between London and Wales. They have no children. In 2021, Gilbert took part in a documentary series about the stigma of male infertility.

In July 2022, Gilbert announced he had been diagnosed with stage four cancer and was being treated at the Velindre Cancer Centre in Cardiff, of which he is a patron. He stated his pre-diagnosis symptoms had worsened while fundraising for Velindre in Cuba, where he also contracted COVID-19. In December 2022, fellow comedian Jimmy Carr promoted Gilbert's DVD The Book of John on Channel 4's The Last Leg on Gilbert's behalf. After undergoing chemo- and radiotherapy, Gilbert was given the all-clear for cancer in October 2023, after which he raised £300,000 for his treatment centre.

Gilbert has ADHD, having been diagnosed in his 50s. Additionally, he suffers from syndactyly (or "webbed fingers") between the middle and ring fingers on his left hand.

== Stand-up shows ==
Year	Title	Notes
2005	1984	Title inspired by Nineteen Eighty-Four
2006	Knocking on Heaven's Door	Title inspired by Knockin' on Heaven's Door
2007	Who's Eaten Gilbert's Grape	Title inspired by What's Eating Gilbert Grape
2008–2009	The Award-Winning Mince Pie	
2009–2010	The Cat That Looked Like Nicholas Lyndhurst	
2012	The Man with the Flaming Battenberg Tattoo	Title inspired by The Girl with the Dragon Tattoo
2019–2023	The Book of John	Tour affected by COVID-19
2024–2025	Rhod Gilbert & the Giant Grapefruit	Title inspired by James and the Giant Peach

=== DVD releases ===
Title	Released	Notes
The Award-Winning Mince Pie	16 November 2009	Live at London's Bloomsbury Theatre
The Cat that Looked like Nicholas Lyndhurst	15 November 2010	Live at London's Hammersmith Apollo
The Man with the Flaming Battenberg Tattoo	19 November 2012	Live at London's Hammersmith Apollo
The Book of John	14 November 2022	Live at Cardiff's Wales Millennium Centre

== Awards ==
2002:

- Finalist in So You Think You're Funny

2003:

- Winner of the Leicester Mercury comedian of the year as part of the Leicester Comedy Festival
- Winner of the Paramount Gift of the Gag competition
- Chortle Award nominee for best new act
- Winner of the BBC New Comedy Award at the Edinburgh Festival Fringe
- Runner-up in the Hackney Empire New Act of The Year competition
- Winner of the Metro and Jongleurs Spike Award for New Talent, South East
- Winner of the National Talent Hunt at the York Festival

2005:

- Chortle award for Best Breakthrough Act
- Nominated for The List and Writers Guild Comedy Award for Rhod Gilbert's 1984
- Perrier nominated for Best Newcomer for Rhod Gilbert's 1984

2006:

- Placed in The Times's Top 50 Comedians
- Named one of The Rough Guide to British Cult Comedy's top 50 icons

2008:

- Nominated for the main IF.COM Eddies (formerly Perrier award) at the Edinburgh Fringe for Rhod Gilbert and the Award-winning Mince Pie
- Winner of the Time Out 'Comic of the Year'
- Winner of the Time Out 'Best Show of the Year' for Rhod Gilbert and the Award-winning Mince Pie
- Winner of the Time Out 'Breakthrough Act'
- Nominated for the Celtic Media awards 'Best Radio Personality' for the Rhod Gilbert Radio Show on BBC Radio Wales

2009:

- Nominated for the Times/South Bank Show Awards, 'Breakthrough Act'
- Winner of Chortle award for 'Best Headliner'
- Winner of "Comics Comic" Chortle award
- Nominated for the Chortle award for Best Show for Rhod Gilbert and the Award-winning Mince Pie

2010:

- Winner of 'Wales' Sexiest Male'

2014:

- Honorary Fellowship at Aberystwyth University
