= Rhod Gilbert's Work Experience =

TV series

- Genre: Comedy
- Presented by: Rhod Gilbert
- Country of origin: United Kingdom
- Original language: English
- No. of series: 9
- No. of episodes: 34 (list of episodes)

Production
- Producers: Rhys Waters; Nathan Mackintosh
- Running time: 30 minutes

Original release
- Network: BBC One Wales
- Release: 19 January 2010 – 19 June 2020

Rhod Gilbert's Work Experience is a British comedy programme produced for BBC One Wales in which stand up comedian Rhod Gilbert attempts various jobs for a limited time (usually a week). Many of the jobs are conducted within his native Wales although some take him further afield to places including Belgium and Yorkshire.

== Episodes ==
=== Series overview ===
Series	Episodes	Originally released	
Series	Episodes	First released	Last released
1	4	19 January 2010	9 February 2010
2	4	7 March 2011	28 March 2011
3	4	7 May 2012	4 September 2012
4	4	5 June 2013	3 July 2013
5	4	17 September 2014	8 October 2014
6	4	16 February 2016	8 March 2016
7	3	10 March 2017	24 March 2017
8	4	22 March 2018	12 April 2018
9	3	17 April 2020	19 June 2020

Broadcast dates sourced from the BBC
Broadcast dates are for the original broadcast on BBC One Wales and not nationally on either BBC One or BBC Two

=== Series 1 (2010) ===
No. overall	No. in series	Title	Original release date
1	1	"Bin Man"	19 January 2010
Rhod learns how to become a bin man before joining the crew of a refuse lorry on the streets of Barry.
2	2	"Mother"	26 January 2010
Rhod learns how to be a stay-at-home mother in a seven-child household in south Wales.
3	3	"Hairdresser"	2 February 2010
Rhod must learn how to become a hairdresser just three days before cutting someone's hair.
4	4	"Soldier"	9 February 2010
Rhod learns how to become a soldier before taking part in a training exercise in the Brecon Beacons.

=== Series 2 (2011) ===
No. overall	No. in series	Title	Original release date
5	1	"Farm"	7 March 2011
Rhod learns various jobs on a farm, including driving a tractor and mucking out the cowsheds.
6	2	"Butler"	14 March 2011
Rhod learns how to become a butler before overseeing the hosting of a meal for a Lord and his guests.
7	3	"Tattooist"	21 March 2011
Rhod learns the art of tattooing, but must first get one himself.
8	4	"Firefighter"	28 March 2011
Rhod joins the Fire & Rescue service as he trains for all manner of events.

=== Series 3 (2012) ===
No. overall	No. in series	Title	Original release date
9	1	"Teacher"	7 May 2012
Rhod learns how to be a teacher at a school near Newport.
10	2	"Zoo Keeper"	14 May 2012
Rhod meets a range of animals at the Welsh Mountain Zoo as he learns the trade of a zoo keeper.
11	3	"Drag Artist"	21 May 2012
Rhod must perform to an audience as a drag queen.
12	4	"Police Officer"	4 September 2012
Rhod joins the South Wales Police Service as he patrols the streets of Cardiff.

=== Series 4 (2013) ===
No. overall	No. in series	Title	Original release date
13	1	"Wedding Planner"	5 June 2013
Rhod organises a couple's Hollywood-themed wedding.
14	2	"Scout Leader"	12 June 2013
Rhod learns how to lead a Scout camp near Swansea.
15	3	"Coach Tour Guide"	26 June 2013
Rhod becomes a coach tour guide on a trip to Belgium.
16	4	"Male Model"	3 July 2013
Rhod tries out various forms of modelling such as being a life drawing model and hand artist.

=== Series 5 (2014) ===
No. overall	No. in series	Title	Original release date
17	1	"Fisherman"	17 September 2014
Rhod learns how to become a deep sea fisherman.
18	2	"Vet"	23 September 2014
Rhod learns what skills are needed to become a vet.
19	3	"Hotelier"	1 October 2014
Rhod takes other a range of roles in a Tenby hotel.
20	4	"RAF Fighter Pilot"	8 October 2014
Rhod joins up with the RAF with the hope of co-piloting on a training exercise.

=== Series 6 (2016) ===
No. overall	No. in series	Title	Original release date
21	1	"Journalist"	16 February 2016
Rhod learns the job of a journalist before making his own news segment for Wales Today.
22	2	"Paranormal Investigator"	23 February 2016
Rhod learns how to investigate the supernatural before hosting a paranormal evening for the public.
23	3	"Rugby Coach"	1 March 2016
Rhod learns how to become a rugby coach before coaching an under-8s team for a tournament.
24	4	"Miner"	8 March 2016
Rhod learns how to use explosives and drive a quarry truck in a Merthyr Tydfil quarry before heading to a mine in Yorkshire.

=== Series 7 (2017) ===
No. overall	No. in series	Title	Original release date
25	1	"Estate Agent"	10 March 2017
Rhod learns how to become an estate agent with the task of selling a home by the end of the week.
26	2	"Builder"	17 March 2017
Rhod learns the trade of bricklaying, carpentry and plumbing in his quest to become a builder.
27	3	"Florist"	31 March 2017
Rhod learns the art of floristry at a Porthcawl florists.

=== Series 8 (2018) ===
No. overall	No. in series	Title	Original release date
28	1	"Classical Musician"	22 March 2018
Rhod tries his hand at being a classical musician.
29	2	"Festival Chef"	29 March 2018
Rhod launches his own fusion food at a busy festival.
30	3	"Cabin Crew"	5 April 2018
Rhod joins an airline cabin crew and shows that he is far from a natural at the role.
31	4	"Navy"	12 April 2018
A seasickness-prone Rhod joins the Royal Navy.

=== Series 9 (2020) ===
No. overall	No. in series	Title	Original release date
32	1	"Care Worker"	17 April 2020
Rhod spends the week in a care home and visiting vulnerable people at home.
33	2	"Cake Art"	12 June 2020
Rhod turns his hand to the intricate business of cake art and discovers that the devil is in the detail.
34	3	"Road Worker"	19 June 2020
Rhod joins a crew of road workers in South Wales to find out what maintaining the highways and byways is really like.
