= List of Never Mind the Buzzcocks episodes =

This is a list of episodes of Never Mind the Buzzcocks, a satirical music-based panel game. As of 18 December 2025, 327 episodes of Never Mind the Buzzcocks have aired, concluding the thirty-third series.

The show was originally chaired by Mark Lamarr, with Sean Hughes and Phill Jupitus as team captains and two guests on each team. Lamarr left following series 17 and series 18 was chaired by a series of guest hosts. One of these, satirical Popworld presenter Simon Amstell, took over as presenter from series 19. Amstell left following series 22 and the show was chaired by guests until the end of Series 27. For Series 28 the show was presented by Rhod Gilbert.

Bill Bailey replaced Sean Hughes from series 11. During series 21, Bailey was unable to attend filming and so Noel Fielding provided cover for three episodes (2, 3 and 4). Bailey left permanently following this series and was replaced by guest captains until Fielding returned full-time in series 23. Professor Green replaced Fielding as team captain for one episode in series 26 (episode 5). Jupitus was unable to appear in one episode of series 25 (episode 6), the only episode of the show's original run he did not appear in (not including the 2011 Comic Relief episode for 24 Hour Panel People, his position on that occasion was taken by Frankie Boyle). In June 2013, an eight-part clip show series aired under the name What a Load of Buzzcocks. Each episode focussed on a different year of the show and the musical stories from that year. Alex James of Blur narrated all episodes of the series.

The show continued on Sky Max (later Sky One) from 2021 onwards, hosted by Greg Davies, with Noel Fielding and Daisy May Cooper as captains, and Jamali Maddix as a regular team member. For the fourth and fifth Sky series, Cooper is no longer team captain, with Sophie Willan being team captain in half of the episodes instead. Sky started numbering the series from 1 again.

== Series overview ==
| Series | Presenter | Team 1 captain | Team 2 captain | Episodes | Originally released | | |
| Series | Presenter | Team 1 captain | Team 2 captain | Episodes | First released | Last released | Network |
|---|---|---|---|---|---|---|---|
| 1 | Mark Lamarr | Phill Jupitus | Sean Hughes | 10 | 12 November 1996 | 21 February 1997 | BBC Two |
| 2 | Mark Lamarr | Phill Jupitus | Sean Hughes | 8 | 15 September 1997 | 29 December 1997 | BBC Two |
| 3 | Mark Lamarr | Phill Jupitus | Sean Hughes | 7 | 27 February 1998 | 17 April 1998 | BBC Two |
| 4 | Mark Lamarr | Phill Jupitus | Sean Hughes | 7 | 11 September 1998 | 30 December 1998 | BBC Two |
| Rewind | Mark Lamarr | Phill Jupitus | Sean Hughes | 1 | 2 November 1998 | | BBC Two |
| 5 | Mark Lamarr | Phill Jupitus | Sean Hughes | 8 | 12 February 1999 | 9 April 1999 | BBC Two |
| 6 | Mark Lamarr | Phill Jupitus | Sean Hughes | 10 | 10 September 1999 | 18 February 2000 | BBC Two |
| 7 | Mark Lamarr | Phill Jupitus | Sean Hughes | 10 | 15 September 2000 | 28 December 2000 | BBC Two |
| 8 | Mark Lamarr | Phill Jupitus | Sean Hughes | 10 | 26 February 2001 | 30 April 2001 | BBC Two |
| 9 | Mark Lamarr | Phill Jupitus | Sean Hughes | 10 | 10 September 2001 | 30 December 2001 | BBC Two |
| 10 | Mark Lamarr | Phill Jupitus | Sean Hughes | 10 | 7 January 2002 | 20 May 2002 | BBC Two |
| 11 | Mark Lamarr | Phill Jupitus | Bill Bailey | 9 | 23 September 2002 | 29 December 2002 | BBC Two |
| 12 | Mark Lamarr | Phill Jupitus | Bill Bailey | 11 | 6 January 2003 | 17 March 2003 | BBC Two |
| 13 | Mark Lamarr | Phill Jupitus | Bill Bailey | 9 | 8 September 2003 | 28 December 2003 | BBC Two |
| 14 | Mark Lamarr | Phill Jupitus | Bill Bailey | 11 | 5 January 2004 | 15 March 2004 | BBC Two |
| 15 | Mark Lamarr | Phill Jupitus | Bill Bailey | 7 | 20 September 2004 | 20 December 2004 | BBC Two |
| 16 | Mark Lamarr | Phill Jupitus | Bill Bailey | 11 | 2 January 2005 | 20 March 2005 | BBC Two |
| 17 | Mark Lamarr | Phill Jupitus | Bill Bailey | 9 | 31 October 2005 | 31 December 2005 | BBC Two |
| 18 | Guests | Phill Jupitus | Bill Bailey | 7 | 13 March 2006 | 24 April 2006 | BBC Two |
| 19 | Simon Amstell | Phill Jupitus | Bill Bailey | 7 | 26 October 2006 | 24 December 2006 | BBC Two |
| 20 | Simon Amstell | Phill Jupitus | Bill Bailey | 6 | 31 January 2007 | 7 March 2007 | BBC Two |
| 21 | Simon Amstell | Phill Jupitus | Bill Bailey | 13 | 15 November 2007 | 14 February 2008 | BBC Two |
| 22 | Simon Amstell | Phill Jupitus | Guests | 13 | 2 October 2008 | 16 January 2009 | BBC Two |
| 23 | Guests | Phill Jupitus | Noel Fielding | 13 | 1 October 2009 | 23 December 2009 | BBC Two |
| 24 | Guests | Phill Jupitus | Noel Fielding | 13 | 21 October 2010 | 5 January 2011 | BBC Two |
| Comic Relief | Guests | Phill Jupitus | Noel Fielding | 1 | 5 March 2011 | | BBC Two |
| 25 | Guests | Phill Jupitus | Noel Fielding | 13 | 3 October 2011 | 29 December 2011 | BBC Two |
| Children in Need | Guests | Phill Jupitus | Noel Fielding | 1 | 18 November 2011 | | BBC Two |
| Sport Relief | Guests | Phill Jupitus | Noel Fielding | 1 | 23 March 2012 | | BBC Two |
| 26 | Guests | Phill Jupitus | Noel Fielding | 13 | 24 September 2012 | 22 December 2012 | BBC Two |
| What a Load | Guests | Phill Jupitus | Noel Fielding | 8 | 3 June 2013 | 22 July 2013 | BBC Two |
| 27 | Guests | Phill Jupitus | Noel Fielding | 13 | 23 September 2013 | 16 December 2013 | BBC Two |
| 28 | Rhod Gilbert | Phill Jupitus | Noel Fielding | 13 | 29 September 2014 | 15 January 2015 | BBC Two |
| 29 | Greg Davies | Daisy May Cooper | Noel Fielding | 8 | 21 September 2021 | 15 December 2021 | Sky Max |
| 30 | Greg Davies | Daisy May Cooper | Noel Fielding | 10 | 14 September 2022 | 29 December 2022 | Sky Max |
| 31 | Greg Davies | Daisy May Cooper | Noel Fielding | 10 | 23 August 2023 | 19 December 2023 | Sky Max |
| 32 | Greg Davies | Sophie Willan | Noel Fielding | 10 | 16 October 2024 | 18 December 2024 | Sky Max |
| 33 | Greg Davies | Sophie Willan | Noel Fielding | 8 | 7 October 2025 | 18 December 2025 | Sky Max |
| 34 | Greg Davies | Guests | Noel Fielding | TBA | December 2026 | December 2026 | Sky One |

== Episodes ==
Guests are listed from the hosts' far right to far left. Guests who are best known as part of a musical group have the group after their name in brackets. Numbers in square brackets after each list indicate that team's total score. The coloured backgrounds denote the result of each of the shows:

– indicates Phill's/Daisy's/Sophie's team won.
– indicates Sean's/Bill's/the guest/Noel's team won.
– indicates the game ended in a draw.

=== Series 1 (1996–97) ===
| No. overall | No. in series | Original air date | Phill's team | Sean's team |
|---|---|---|---|---|
| 1 | 1 | 12 November 1996 | Donna McPhail and Bruce Dickinson (Iron Maiden) [23] | Richard Fairbrass (Right Said Fred) and Mathew Priest (Dodgy) [25] |
| 2 | 2 | 19 November 1996 | Cathy Dennis and Ashley Slater (Freak Power) [16] | Shovell (M People) and Graham Norton [11] |
| 3 | 3 | 26 November 1996 | Andy McCluskey (OMD) and David McAlmont [32] | Martin Chambers (The Pretenders) and Bob Mortimer [20] |
| 4 | 4 | 3 December 1996 | Billy Bragg and Sarah Cracknell (Saint Etienne) [21] | Suggs (Madness) and Jeff Green [16] |
| 5 | 5 | 10 December 1996 | Jonathan Ross and Martin Rossiter (Gene) [9] | Marcella Detroit (Shakespears Sister) and Nick Heyward (Haircut One Hundred) [22] |
| 6 | 6 | 17 December 1996 | Jake Burns (Stiff Little Fingers) and Richie Wermerling (Let Loose) [16] | Tony Wright (Terrorvision) and Bob Mills [17] |
| 7 | 7 | 24 January 1997 | Peter Hook (Joy Division) and Clare Grogan [16] | Ace (Skunk Anansie) and Alan Davies [18] |
| 8 | 8 | 31 January 1997 | Crispin Hunt (The Longpigs) and Adam Ant [16] | Jo Whiley and John Thomson [13] |
| 9 | 9 | 7 February 1997 | Neil Hannon (The Divine Comedy) and Lauren Laverne (Kenickie) [21] | Glenn Tilbrook (Squeeze) and Mark Thomas [18] |
| 10 | 10 | 21 February 1997 | Best of Series 1 | Best of Series 1 |

=== Series 2 (1997) ===
| No. overall | No. in series | Original air date | Phill's team | Sean's team |
|---|---|---|---|---|
| 11 | 1 | 15 September 1997 | Suggs (Madness) and Shaggy [15+1] | Marie du Santiago (Kenickie) and Mark Little [15] |
| 12 | 2 | 22 September 1997 | Tony Wright (Terrorvision) and Gary Barlow (Take That) [15] | Edwyn Collins and Jeff Green [16] |
| 13 | 3 | 29 September 1997 | Sarah Blackwood (Dubstar) and Neil Morrissey [15] | Richard Fairbrass (Right Said Fred) and Billy Bragg [15+1] |
| 14 | 4 | 6 October 1997 | Graham Norton and Midge Ure [13] | Shelly Poole (Alisha's Attic) and Math Priest (Dodgy) [19] |
| 15 | 5 | 13 October 1997 | Richard Fairbrass (Right Said Fred) and Lisa I'Anson [19] | Mark Owen (Take That) and Shovell (M People) [11] |
| 16 | 6 | 20 October 1997 | Bruce Dickinson (Iron Maiden) and Brian Molko (Placebo) [13] | Saffron (Republica) and David Baddiel [17] |
| 17 | 7 | 27 October 1997 | Jeff Green and Louise Redknapp [17] | Norman Blake (Teenage Fanclub) and Mathew Priest (Dodgy) [16] |
| 18 | 8 | 29 December 1997 | Jonathan Ross and Louise Wener (Sleeper) [7] | Noddy Holder (Slade) and Boy George [14] |

=== Series 3 (1998) ===
| No. overall | No. in series | Original air date | Phill's team | Sean's team |
|---|---|---|---|---|
| 19 | 1 | 27 February 1998 | Jonathan Ross and Andrew Roachford [15] | Cerys Matthews (Catatonia) and Donna McPhail [13] |
| 20 | 2 | 6 March 1998 | Rick McMurray (Ash) and Lemmy (Motörhead) [11] | Mani (Primal Scream) and Richard Fairbrass (Right Said Fred) [18] |
| 21 | 3 | 13 March 1998 | Tony Wright (Terrorvision) and Toyah Willcox (Toyah) [9+1] | Saul Davies (James) and John Moloney [9] |
| 22 | 4 | 20 March 1998 | Louis Eliot (Rialto) and Zoe Ball [16] | Keith Duffy (Boyzone) and Graham Norton [4] |
| 23 | 5 | 27 March 1998 | Shovell (M People) and Rick Witter (Shed Seven) [17] | Mark Owen (Take That) and Richard Morton [16] |
| 24 | 6 | 3 April 1998 | Mathew Priest (Dodgy) and Tom Robinson [13] | Lauren Laverne (Kenickie) and Jeff Green [14] |
| 25 | 7 | 17 April 1998 | Mary Anne Hobbs and Jonathan Ross [8] | Billy Bragg and Justin Currie (Del Amitri) [13] |

=== Series 4 (1998) ===
| No. overall | No. in series | Original air date | Phill's team | Sean's team |
|---|---|---|---|---|
| 26 | 1 | 11 September 1998 | Chris Moyles and Bill Bailey [10] | Vic Reeves and James Broad (Silver Sun) [13] |
| 27 | 2 | 18 September 1998 | Tony Wright (Terrorvision) and Glenn Gregory (Heaven 17) [12] | Bez (Happy Mondays and Black Grape) and Bob Mills [10] |
| 28 | 3 | 25 September 1998 | Tom Robinson and Emmy-Kate Montrose (Kenickie) [13] | Neil Hannon (The Divine Comedy) and Keith Chegwin [13+1] |
| 29 | 4 | 2 October 1998 | Ken McAlpine (The Supernaturals) and Jayne Middlemiss [13] | Sean Cullen and Sophie Ellis-Bextor (theaudience) [17] |
| 30 | 5 | 9 October 1998 | Mani (The Stone Roses and Primal Scream) and Matthew Marsden [16] | Jah Wobble (PiL) and Jo Brand [14] |
| 31 | 6 | 16 October 1998 | Mark Chadwick (The Levellers) and Mel Giedroyc [13] | Jimmy Constable (911) and Arthur Smith [8] |
| 32 | 7 | 30 December 1998 (Note: Christmas Special) | Rick Wakeman (Yes) and Melanie C (Spice Girls) [10] | Natalie Appleton (All Saints) and Huey Morgan (Fun Lovin' Criminals) [8] |

=== Never Rewind the Buzzcocks (1998) ===
| No. overall | Original air date | Phill's team | Sean's team |
|---|---|---|---|
| – | 2 November 1998 (Note: Episode released exclusive-to-video.) | Jonathan Ross and Sarah Cracknell (St. Etienne) [16] | Noddy Holder and Math Priest (Dodgy) [23] |

=== Series 5 (1999) ===
| No. overall | No. in series | Original air date | Phill's team | Sean's team |
|---|---|---|---|---|
| 33 | 1 | 12 February 1999 | Ian Dury and Karen Poole (Alisha's Attic) [14] | Simon Le Bon (Duran Duran) and Kathy Burke [18] |
| 34 | 2 | 19 February 1999 | Sara Cox and Glen Matlock (Sex Pistols) [13] | Faye Tozer (Steps) and Junior Simpson [15] |
| 35 | 3 | 26 February 1999 | Frank Skinner and Leeroy Thornhill (The Prodigy) [19] | Rick Wakeman and Paul Godfrey (Morcheeba) [8] |
| 36 | 4 | 5 March 1999 | Nick Keynes (Ultra) and Meat Loaf [12] | Billie Piper and Rowland Rivron [13] |
| 37 | 5 | 19 March 1999 | Carl Cox and Roy Wood [11] | John Hegley and Kate Thornton [9] |
| 38 | 6 | 26 March 1999 | Adam Bloom and Kele Le Roc [12] | Tom Gray (Gomez) and Toyah Willcox (Toyah) [8] |
| 39 | 7 | 2 April 1999 (Note: This episode lasted 45 minutes. It also featured Mark Lamarr in the Identity Parade.) | Tony Wright (Terrorvision) and Howard Jones [15] | Bill Bailey and Grant Nicholas (Feeder) [10] |
| 40 | 8 | 9 April 1999 | Chrissie Hynde (The Pretenders) and Josie Lawrence [16] | Tony Hadley (Spandau Ballet) and Bobby Davro [11] |

=== Series 6 (1999–2000) ===
| No. overall | No. in series | Original air date | Phill's team | Sean's team |
|---|---|---|---|---|
| 41 | 1 | 10 September 1999 | Arthur Smith and Sister Bliss (Faithless) [11] | Jayne Middlemiss and Martin Fry (ABC) [15] |
| 42 | 2 | 17 September 1999 | Jeff Green and Nik Kershaw [13] | Róisín Murphy (Moloko) and Dane Bowers (Another Level) [14] |
| 43 | 3 | 24 September 1999 | Sarah Cawood and David Essex [13+1] | Jason "J" Brown (5ive) and Pauline McLynn [13] |
| 44 | 4 | 1 October 1999 | Marianne Faithfull and Sean Lock [42] | Gail Porter and Stuart Adamson (The Skids & Big Country) [17] |
| 45 | 5 | 8 October 1999 | Boy George and Lisa Scott-Lee (Steps) [13] | Suggs and Jo Brand [14] |
| 46 | 6 | 15 October 1999 | Ben Ofoedu (Phats & Small) and Suzi Quatro [13] | Ian Broudie and Rich Hall [11] |
| 47 | 7 | 22 October 1999 | Vic Henley and Brian McFadden (Westlife) [5] | Jamie Benson (Hepburn) and Mary Byker (Apollo 440) [9] |
| 48 | 8 | 29 December 1999 (Note: Future team captain Bill Bailey makes a guest appearance during the Intros Round with Rick Wakeman.) | Goldie and Martine McCutcheon [17] | Les McKeown (Bay City Rollers) and Frank Skinner [12] |
| 49 | 9 | 11 February 2000 | Junior Simpson and Davina McCall [11] | Tommy Vance and Chandrasonic (Asian Dub Foundation) [5] |
| 50 | 10 | 18 February 2000 | Chas Hodges and Nicky Shaw (Thunderbugs) [14] | Kelle Bryan and Simon Day [13] |

=== Series 7 (2000) ===
| No. overall | No. in series | Original air date | Phill's team | Sean's team |
|---|---|---|---|---|
| 51 | 1 | 15 September 2000 (Note: This episode started and ended with regular Identity Parade star Athelston Williams in Mark's chair.) | Róisín Murphy (Moloko) and John Entwistle (The Who) [9] | Danny McNamara (Embrace) and Johnny Vegas [8] |
| 52 | 2 | 22 September 2000 | Graham Gouldman (10cc) and Daphne & Celeste (Note: The first time more than the regulatory three people were on one team.) [11] | Pär Wiksten (The Wannadies) and Stuart Maconie [9] |
| 53 | 3 | 29 September 2000 | June Sarpong and Gary Stringer (Reef) [12] | Mark Morriss (The Bluetones) and Bradley Walsh [13] |
| 54 | 4 | 6 October 2000 | Jo Brand and Josh Doyle (The Dum Dums) [11] | Melanie Brown and Sally James [10] |
| 55 | 5 | 13 October 2000 | Bob Mortimer and Jamelia [11] | Kirsty MacColl and Joseph Washbourn (Toploader) [9] |
| 56 | 6 | 20 October 2000 | Mark Steel and Ritchie Neville (5ive) [13] | Josie d'Arby and Pete Shelley (Buzzcocks) [15] |
| 57 | 7 | 27 October 2000 | Sean Lock and Paul Young [12] | Melanie C (Spice Girls) and Dermot O'Leary [10] |
| 58 | 8 | 3 November 2000 | Kate Thornton and David Soul [11] | Dane Bowers (Another Level) and Dave Gorman [10] |
| 59 | 9 | 10 November 2000 | Trevor Nelson and Alvin Stardust [7] | Liz McClarnon (Atomic Kitten) and Lloyd Cole [11] |
| 60 | 10 | 28 December 2000 | Tony Wright (Terrorvision) and Dave Hill (Slade) | Lorraine Kelly and Rich Hall |

=== Series 8 (2001) ===
| No. overall | No. in series | Original air date | Phill's team | Sean's team |
|---|---|---|---|---|
| 61 | 1 | 26 February 2001 | Sarah Cawood and Pete Devereux (Artful Dodger) | Brian Molko (Placebo) and Rhona Cameron |
| 62 | 2 | 5 March 2001 | Tania Strecker and Brian Harvey (East 17) | Dave Mustaine (Megadeth) and Arthur Smith |
| 63 | 3 | 12 March 2001 | Tony Blackburn and Slash (Guns N' Roses) | Paul Marazzi (a1) and Josie d'Arby |
| 64 | 4 | 19 March 2001 | Junior Simpson and Claire Richards (Steps) | Miles Hunt (The Wonder Stuff) and Michael Greco |
| 65 | 5 | 26 March 2001 | Glenn Tilbrook (Squeeze) and Dane Bowers | Darius Danesh and Vic Henley |
| 66 | 6 | 2 April 2001 | Mark Owen (Take That) and Kym Marsh (Hear'say) | Noel Sullivan (Hear'Say) and Johnny Vegas |
| 67 | 7 | 9 April 2001 | Eddie Brill and Dani Filth (Cradle of Filth) | Lisa Rogers and Steve Harley |
| 68 | 8 | 16 April 2001 | Rowland Rivron and Barbara Dickson | Jade Jones (Damage) and Phil Kay |
| 69 | 9 | 23 April 2001 | Jo Caulfield and John Taylor (Duran Duran) | Fish (Marillion) and Jon Lee (Feeder) |
| 70 | 10 | 30 April 2001 | Ralf Little and Samantha Fox | Leo Sayer and Leeroy Thornhill (The Prodigy) |

=== Series 9 (2001) ===
| No. overall | No. in series | Original air date | Phill's team | Sean's team |
|---|---|---|---|---|
| 71 | 1 | 10 September 2001 | Katy Hill and Matthew Meschery (OPM) | Ben Volpeliere-Pierrot (Curiosity Killed the Cat) and Steve Strange |
| 72 | 2 | 17 September 2001 | Paul Ross and MC Harvey (So Solid Crew) | Faye Tozer (Steps) and Ian Astbury (The Cult) |
| 73 | 3 | 24 September 2001 | Claire Sweeney and Ben Adams (a1) | Chris McCormack (3 Colours Red) and Dara Ó Briain |
| 74 | 4 | 1 October 2001 | Kermit (Ruthless Rap Assassins, Black Grape) and Captain Sensible | Toyah Willcox (Toyah) and Steve Lamacq |
| 75 | 5 | 8 October 2001 | Mark Steel and Edith Bowman | Kevin Simm (Liberty X) and Terry Hall |
| 76 | 6 | 15 October 2001 | Jon Culshaw and Tony Mortimer (East 17) | Roger Sanchez and Brian Molko (Placebo) |
| 77 | 7 | 22 October 2001 | Ricky Tomlinson and Becky Hunter (allSTARS*) | David Van Day (Dollar) and Jenni Falconer |
| 78 | 8 | 29 October 2001 | Richard McNamara (Embrace) and Jo Breezer | Alesha Dixon (Mis-Teeq) and Rich Hall |
| 79 | 9 | 5 November 2001 | Mike Wilmot and Kiki Dee | Richard Fairbrass and Phil Alexander (editor-in-chief of Kerrang!) |
| 80 | 10 | 30 December 2001 | Johnny Vegas and Belinda Carlisle (The Go-Go's) | Myleene Klass (Hear'Say) and Fish (Marillion) |

=== Series 10 (2002) ===
| No. overall | No. in series | Original air date | Phill's team | Sean's team |
|---|---|---|---|---|
| 81 | 1 | 7 January 2002 | Mari Wilson and Boy George | Blade and Tommy Vance |
| 82 | 2 | 14 January 2002 | Boothby Graffoe and DJ Spoony | Cathy Dennis and Craig Cash |
| 83 | 3 | 21 January 2002 | Adam Buxton and Midge Ure (Ultravox) | Suzi Quatro and Claudia Winkleman |
| 84 | 4 | 28 January 2002 | Beverley Turner and Lesley Garrett | Leee John (Imagination) and Ben Norris |
| 85 | 5 | 4 February 2002 | Kerry McFadden and Ashley Taylor Dawson (allSTARS*) | Pete Burns (Dead or Alive) and Christian O'Connell |
| 86 | 6 | 11 February 2002 | Nemone and Alexander O'Neal | Ian Watkins (Lostprophets) and Mark Owen (Take That) |
| 87 | 7 | 18 February 2002 | Ben Miller and Lisa Scott-Lee | Kate Thornton and Tony Wilson |
| 88 | 8 | 25 February 2002 | Dave Johns and Christian Ingebrigtsen (a1) | Paul Young and June Sarpong |
| 89 | 9 | 4 March 2002 | Shaun Williamson and Coleen Nolan | Bruce Dickinson and Ian Stone |
| 90 | 10 | 20 May 2002 (Note: Eurovision Song Contest special.) (Note: Last appearance of Sean Hughes.) | Cheryl Baker and Sonia | Johnny Logan and Terry Wogan |

=== Series 11 (2002) ===
| No. overall | No. in series | Original air date | Phill's team | Bill's team |
|---|---|---|---|---|
| 91 | 1 | 23 September 2002 | Ben Shephard and Clare Grogan (Altered Images) | Jenny Frost (Atomic Kitten) and Mark Goodier |
| 92 | 2 | 30 September 2002 | Robin Campbell (UB40) and Abs Breen (5ive) | Ali Campbell (UB40) and Marilyn |
| 93 | 3 | 7 October 2002 | Sean Lock and Jason Perry (A) | Lorraine Pearson (Five Star) and Budgie (Siouxsie and the Banshees) |
| 94 | 4 | 14 October 2002 | Lauren Laverne and Jimmy Cliff | Sheila Ferguson and Stephen Frost |
| 95 | 5 | 21 October 2002 | Billy Bragg and Ian McLagan (The Small Faces & The Faces) | Gay-Yee Westerhoff (bond) and Mark Steel |
| 96 | 6 | 28 October 2002 | Jackie Clune and Gary Moore (Thin Lizzy) | Chris Baker (Mint Royale) and Tony Blackburn |
| 97 | 7 | 4 November 2002 | Emma B and Neil Innes (Bonzo Dog Doo-Dah Band) | Sebastian Bach (Skid Row) and Dave Fulton |
| 98 | 8 | 11 November 2002 | Mike Wilmot and Nick Carter (Backstreet Boys) | Jean-Jacques Burnel (The Stranglers) and Nicholas Parsons |
| 99 | 9 | 29 December 2002 | Geoffrey Hayes and Coolio | Kelly Llorenna and Peter Stringfellow |

=== Series 12 (2003) ===
| No. overall | No. in series | Original air date | Phill's team | Bill's team |
|---|---|---|---|---|
| 100 | 1 | 6 January 2003 (Note: 100th Episode Special. Contains specially filmed inserts with Mark, Phill, Bill and Richard Fairbrass.) | Suzi Perry and John Otway | Charlie Simpson (Busted) and Richard Fairbrass (Right Said Fred) |
| 101 | 2 | 13 January 2003 | Mike Read and Dan Hipgrave (Toploader) | Jessica Garlick and Rick Wakeman |
| 102 | 3 | 20 January 2003 | June Sarpong and Gordon Haskell (King Crimson) | Mikey Craig (Culture Club) and Tom McRae |
| 103 | 4 | 27 January 2003 (Note: For the "Next Lines" round, Mark had Phill and Scott Mills swap places and Scott was the new team captain. After the round was over, Scott returned to and Chas Smash joined Bill's team, who had won the game.) | Gary Beadle and Chas Smash (Madness) | Kathryn Williams and Scott Mills |
| 104 | 5 | 3 February 2003 | Jimmy Carr and Claudia Winkleman | Róisín Murphy (Moloko) and Lisa Stansfield |
| 105 | 6 | 10 February 2003 | Fearne Cotton and Sarah Whatmore | Dennis Locorriere (Dr. Hook) and Christian Livingstone (The Datsuns) |
| 106 | 7 | 17 February 2003 | Christian O'Connell and Guy McKnight (Eighties Matchbox) | Nick Bracegirdle (Chicane) and Rich Hall |
| 107 | 8 | 24 February 2003 | Adam Hills and Jaret Reddick (Bowling for Soup) | Sam Brown and Matt Hales (Aqualung) |
| 108 | 9 | 3 March 2003 | Hugh Cornwell (Stranglers) and Siobhan Fahey (Bananarama) | Sean Rowley and Barry Cryer |
| 109 | 10 | 10 March 2003 | Liz Bonnin and Su-Elise Nash (Mis-Teeq) | DJ Sammy and Tom Rhodes |
| 110 | 11 | 17 March 2003 | Ron Mael (Sparks) and Russell Mael (Sparks) (Note: This episode marks the first time members of the same band, let alone members of the same family, appeared on one team.) | Pete Tong and Dave Johns |

=== Series 13 (2003) ===
| No. overall | No. in series | Original air date | Phill's team | Bill's team |
|---|---|---|---|---|
| 111 | 1 | 8 September 2003 | Dick Valentine (Electric Six) and Huey Morgan (Fun Lovin' Criminals) | Louise Redknapp and Alexei Sayle |
| 112 | 2 | 15 September 2003 | Raul Malo (The Mavericks) and Har Mar Superstar | Liz McClarnon (Atomic Kitten) and Mark Richardson (Skunk Anansie) |
| 113 | 3 | 22 September 2003 | Megaman (So Solid Crew) and Martina Topley-Bird | Howard Jones and Jackie Clune |
| 114 | 4 | 29 September 2003 | Josie d'Arby and Joel Pott (Athlete) | Jane McDonald and Gavin Webster |
| 115 | 5 | 6 October 2003 | Wayne Sleep and Sian Evans (Kosheen) | Clint Boon (Inspiral Carpets) and Mike Wilmot |
| 116 | 6 | 13 October 2003 | Vic Henley and Myleene Klass (Hear'Say) | Andy Bell (Erasure) and Sinitta |
| 117 | 7 | 20 October 2003 | Adam Hills and Matt Hales | Guy Garvey (Elbow) and Jayne Middlemiss |
| 118 | 8 | 27 October 2003 | Simon Amstell and Kym Marsh | MC Romeo (So Solid Crew) and Gary Wilmot |
| 119 | 9 | 28 December 2003 | Alison Goldfrapp and DJ Sammy | Sabrina Washington (Mis-Teeq) and Gloria Hunniford |

=== Series 14 (2004) ===
| No. overall | No. in series | Original air date | Phill's team | Bill's team |
|---|---|---|---|---|
| 120 | 1 | 5 January 2004 | Terry Hall and Dave Fulton | Kwame Kwei-Armah and Brandon Block |
| 121 | 2 | 12 January 2004 | Alice Cooper and Katie Melua | Tony Hadley and Jane Moore |
| 122 | 3 | 19 January 2004 | Mike Lewis (Lostprophets) and Lisa Maffia | David Grant and Dave Johns |
| 123 | 4 | 26 January 2004 | Tony Wilson and Alistair Griffin | Carol Decker (T'Pau) and Jimmy Carr |
| 124 | 5 | 2 February 2004 | Gareth Jones and Mikey Green (Phixx) | Lionel Blair and Tommy Scott (Space) |
| 125 | 6 | 9 February 2004 | Crispian Mills and Sheila Ferguson | Jill Jackson (Speedway) and James Redmond |
| 126 | 7 | 16 February 2004 | Dara Ó Briain and Fatman Scoop | Gary Jules and Wes Butters |
| 127 | 8 | 23 February 2004 | Fish and Ryan Richards (Funeral for a Friend) | Bernadette Nolan and Stuart Maconie |
| 128 | 9 | 1 March 2004 | Lynsey Brown (Clea) and Raghav | Martha Reeves and Adam Duritz (Counting Crows) |
| 129 | 10 | 8 March 2004 | Rich Hall and Amy Winehouse | Mike Peters (The Alarm) and Fearne Cotton |
| 130 | 11 | 15 March 2004 | Kenny Lynch and Asher D | Mark Joseph and Carrie Grant |

=== Series 15 (2004) ===
| No. overall | No. in series | Original air date | Phill's team | Bill's team |
|---|---|---|---|---|
| 131 | 1 | 20 September 2004 | Samuel Preston (The Ordinary Boys) and Randy (Big Brovaz) | Matt Goss (Bros) and Shystie |
| 132 | 2 | 27 September 2004 | Eos Chater (bond) and Dave Bartram (Showaddywaddy) | Har Mar Superstar and Leigh Marklew (Terrorvision) |
| 133 | 3 | 4 October 2004 | Louis Walsh and Ben Ofoedu (Phats & Small & Intenso Project) | Jason Donovan and Lara McAllen |
| 134 | 4 | 11 October 2004 | Lisa Scott-Lee (Steps) and Nick Atkinson (Rooster) | Toyah Willcox (Toyah) and Larry Hibbitt (Hundred Reasons) |
| 135 | 5 | 18 October 2004 | Nicole Russo (Brand New Heavies) and Joe Brown | Buster Bloodvessel and Shola Ama |
| 136 | 6 | 25 October 2004 | Aaron Gilbert (Delays) and Jane McDonald | Katie Melua and Michelle Gayle |
| 137 | 7 | 20 December 2004 | Noddy Holder (Slade) and David "Ollie" Oliver (Point Break & Freefaller) | Siobhan Fahey (Bananarama) and Jackie Clune |

=== Series 16 (2005) ===
| No. overall | No. in series | Original air date | Phill's team | Bill's team |
|---|---|---|---|---|
| 138 | 1 | 2 January 2005 | Dave Johns and Hannah Lewis (Pop!) | Suzi Quatro and Beverley Turner |
| 139 | 2 | 9 January 2005 | Roni Size and Dominic Masters (The Others) | Ewen MacIntosh and Keedie |
| 140 | 3 | 16 January 2005 | Mylo and Richard Park | Martin Fry (ABC) and Therese Grankvist |
| 141 | 4 | 23 January 2005 | Pete Tong and Chris Park (Phixx) | Fearne Cotton and Stephen Frost |
| 142 | 5 | 30 January 2005 | Mickey Hutton and Greg Oliver (Fierce Girl) | Isaac Hanson (Hanson) and Dave Berry |
| 143 | 6 | 6 February 2005 | Nihal Arthanayake and Gary Brooker (Procol Harum) | Raghav and Paul Heaton (Beautiful South) |
| 144 | 7 | 13 February 2005 | Ortis Deley and Ricky Wilson (Kaiser Chiefs) | Keisha White and Jim Jefferies |
| 145 | 8 | 27 February 2005 | Kate Garraway and Tyson Kennedy (Steriogram) | Bez (Happy Mondays) and Tony Christie |
| 146 | 9 | 6 March 2005 | Kenzie (Blazin' Squad) and Chinyere (VS) | DJ Spoony and Lucy Porter |
| 147 | 10 | 13 March 2005 | Emma Griffiths and Magne Furuholmen (a-ha) | Terri Walker and Richard Fairbrass (Right Said Fred) |
| 148 | 11 | 20 March 2005 | Simon Amstell and Melanie Blatt (All Saints) | Estelle and Bradley Walsh |

=== Series 17 (2005) ===
| No. overall | No. in series | Original air date | Phill's team | Bill's team |
|---|---|---|---|---|
| 149 | 1 | 31 October 2005 | Holly Willoughby and Katie Melua | Darren Hayes and Dave Fulton |
| 150 | 2 | 7 November 2005 | Tony Livesey and Blak Twang | Rowetta and Jo Caulfield |
| 151 | 3 | 14 November 2005 | Lucy Porter and Daniel Powter | Chas Hodges and Yvette Fielding |
| 152 | 4 | 21 November 2005 | Dave Berry and Brinsley Forde | Myleene Klass (Hear'Say) and Rich Hall |
| 153 | 5 | 28 November 2005 | Claudia Winkleman and Richard Archer (HARD-Fi) | Katrina Leskanich and Richard Park |
| 154 | 6 | 5 December 2005 | Adam Hills and Nihal Arthanayake | Kathryn Williams and Tony Blackburn |
| 155 | 7 | 12 December 2005 | Liz Bonnin and Nate James | Steve Mason (King Biscuit Time) and Lionel Blair |
| 156 | 8 | 20 December 2005 | Kate Garraway and Tony Christie | Aled Jones and David Grant |
| 157 | 9 | 31 December 2005 (Note: 150th Episode Special and also Mark Lamarr's final episode) | Alun Cochrane and Toyah Willcox (Toyah) | Ben Adams (a1) and Annie Mac |

=== Series 18 (2006) ===
| No. overall | No. in series | Original air date | Guest host | Phill's team | Bill's team |
|---|---|---|---|---|---|
| 158 | 1 | 13 March 2006 | Jonathan Ross | Alan Carr and Tom Fletcher (McFly) | Teddy Mitchell (The Mitchell Brothers) and Fiona Phillips |
| 159 | 2 | 20 March 2006 | Simon Amstell | Russell Howard and Kenzie (Blazin' Squad and Friday Hill) | Aaron Gilbert (Delays) and Nick Knowles |
| 160 | 3 | 27 March 2006 | Ricky Wilson | Jeff Green and Bez (Happy Mondays) | Colin Murray and Ryan Jarman (The Cribs) |
| 161 | 4 | 3 April 2006 | Lauren Laverne | Linda Robson and Neil Claxton (Mint Royale) | Charlie Simpson (Busted and Fightstar) and Rhod Gilbert |
| 162 | 5 | 10 April 2006 | Jeremy Clarkson | Trisha Goddard and Antony Costa (Blue) (Note: Achieved a last-minute victory without Phill, who departed partway through "Next Lines.") | Rick Wakeman (Yes) and Jim Jefferies |
| 163 | 6 | 17 April 2006 | Huey Morgan | Reginald D. Hunter and Sheila Ferguson (The Three Degrees) | Andy Rourke (The Smiths) and Natalie Cassidy |
| 164 | 7 | 24 April 2006 | Dale Winton | Sally Lindsay and Suzi Quatro | Andy Fairweather Low and Ben Fogle |

=== Series 19 (2006) ===
| No. overall | No. in series | Original air date | Phill's team | Bill's team |
|---|---|---|---|---|
| 165 | 1 | 26 October 2006 | Phil Nichol and Ricky Ross (Deacon Blue) | Alesha Dixon (Mis-Teeq) and Anthea Turner |
| 166 | 2 | 2 November 2006 | Vanessa Feltz and Matt Willis (Busted) | Paul Young and Will Smith |
| 167 | 3 | 9 November 2006 | Stewart Lee and Jason Pebworth (Orson) | Tony Mortimer (East 17) and Bill Oddie |
| 168 | 4 | 16 November 2006 | Penny Smith and Alex Pennie (The Automatic) | Amy Winehouse and Andrew Maxwell |
| 169 | 5 | 23 November 2006 | Robin Ince and Daniel Bedingfield | Kelli Young (Liberty X) and John Barrowman |
| 170 | 6 | 30 November 2006 | Steve Strange and Lily Allen | Jamelia and Mark Watson |
| 171 | 7 | 24 December 2006 | David Gest and Dan Gillespie Sells (The Feeling) | Danny Jones (McFly) and Jenni Falconer |

=== Series 20 (2007) ===
| No. overall | No. in series | Original air date | Phill's team | Bill's team |
|---|---|---|---|---|
| 172 | 1 | 31 January 2007 | Alan Davies and Chris Peck (Boy Kill Boy) | Nerina Pallot and Matt Baker |
| 173 | 2 | 7 February 2007 | Philip Olivier and Donny Tourette (Towers of London) | Alfie Jackson (The Holloways) and Noel Fielding |
| 174 | 3 | 14 February 2007 | Ed Byrne and Samuel Preston (The Ordinary Boys) (Note: Ed Seymour, a hand-picked "lookalike" from the audience, replaced Preston for the remainder of the show after he walked out due to Amstell making references to his rise to fame in Celebrity Big Brother and reading extracts from the biography of his then wife (Chantelle Houghton).) | Fyfe Dangerfield (Guillemots) and Anne Charleston |
| 175 | 4 | 21 February 2007 | Nicholas Hoult and Midge Ure (Ultravox) | Romeo Stodart (The Magic Numbers) and Russell Howard |
| 176 | 5 | 28 February 2007 | Jonas Armstrong and Nick Hodgson (Kaiser Chiefs) | Sinitta and Dom Joly |
| 177 | 6 | 7 March 2007 | Adam Buxton and Melanie C (Spice Girls) | Bonnie Tyler and Krishnan Guru-Murthy |

=== Series 21 (2007–08) ===
| No. overall | No. in series | Original air date | Phill's team | Bill's team (Note: For the second, third and fourth episodes of Series 21, Noel Fielding was the team captain while Bill Bailey was on tour.) |
|---|---|---|---|---|
| 178 | 1 | 15 November 2007 | Jessica Hynes and Lethal Bizzle | Joel Pott (Athlete) and Kimberly Stewart |
| 179 | 2 | 22 November 2007 | Katy Brand and Jermaine Jackson | David Cross, Noel Fielding and Ryan Jarman (The Cribs) |
| 180 | 3 | 29 November 2007 | Rich Fulcher and Dappy (N-Dubz) | Tahita Bulmer (New Young Pony Club), Noel Fielding and Keith Chegwin |
| 181 | 4 | 6 December 2007 | Bobby Davro and Roy Stride (Scouting For Girls) | Richard Fleeshman, Noel Fielding and Kristen Schaal |
| 182 | 5 | 13 December 2007 | Miquita Oliver and Patrick Wolf | Irwin Sparkes (The Hoosiers) and Kevin Eldon |
| 183 | 6 | 20 December 2007 | Vic Reeves and Mark Ronson | Matt Bowman (The Pigeon Detectives) and Myleene Klass (Hear'Say) |
| 184 | 7 | 3 January 2008 | Mathew Horne and Kate Nash | Antony Costa and Martin Freeman |
| 185 | 8 | 10 January 2008 | Lauren Laverne and KT Tunstall | Jon McClure (Reverend and the Makers) and Jeremy Edwards |
| 186 | 9 | 17 January 2008 | Christopher Biggins and Sam Duckworth (Get Cape. Wear Cape. Fly) | Robyn and Mark Watson |
| 187 | 10 | 24 January 2008 | Tim Minchin and Yannis Philippakis (Foals) | Sophie Ellis-Bextor and James Lance |
| 188 | 11 | 31 January 2008 (Note: This episode featured frequent appearances from singer Andy Scott-Lee (formerly of boy band 3SL), who performed the Intros round (when teams played their 'Andy Scott-Lee card'), appeared in an Identity Parade line-up and had his new single heavily promoted by Amstell.) | Chris O'Dowd and Joe Goddard (Hot Chip) | Dev Hynes (Lightspeed Champion) (Note: As part of a jibe on the fickle nature and inflated importance of the NME's Cool List, a fictitious indie artist named 'Adam from Flipchart Hiatus' was initially introduced as Bill Bailey's second guest. Amstell then announced that Flipchart Hiatus had slipped too many places on the Cool List and so had to be replaced. Crew members then rushed on to lift Adam from his seat and replace him with Hynes.) and James Nesbitt |
| 189 | 12 | 7 February 2008 | Dale Winton and Moby | Jamelia and David O'Doherty |
| TBA | 13 | 14 February 2008 | Best of Series 21 | Best of Series 21 |

=== Series 22 (2008–09) ===
| No. overall | No. in series | Original air date | Phill's team | Second team (captains in bold) (Note: For this series, guest captains replaced Bill Bailey who left to pursue other projects.) |
|---|---|---|---|---|
| 190 | 1 | 2 October 2008 | Ralf Little and Jamie Reynolds (Klaxons) | Adele, **Mark Ronson** and Tim Minchin |
| 191 | 2 | 9 October 2008 (Note: In honour of guest captain Stephen Fry, this episode had various QI-themed jokes including giving Stephen a customised buzzer, intellectual conversations over interesting facts, and ending the show with the QI theme tune.) | Dominic Cooper and Frankie Sandford (The Saturdays) | Matt Shultz (Cage the Elephant), **Stephen Fry** and Josie Long |
| 192 | 3 | 16 October 2008 | Nick Grimshaw and Kelly Rowland (Destiny's Child) | Jack Osbourne, **Bob Mortimer** and David O'Doherty |
| 193 | 4 | 23 October 2008 | Rhys Darby and Harry Judd (McFly) | Kate Jackson (The Long Blondes), **Johnny Vegas** and Danny Dyer |
| – | 5 | 19 January 2011 (Note: Due to a scandal where Jonathan Ross and Russell Brand made prank phonecalls to Andrew Sachs on Russell's BBC Radio 2 show, the BBC decided to suspend the two comedians and pull all their shows pending further investigation. Even though this episode was taped before the suspension and was due to air on 30 October 2008, it was pulled as well. The episode was eventually first broadcast on 19 January 2011.) | Hugh Fearnley-Whittingstall and Sway | Rachel Stevens (S Club 7), **Russell Brand** and Greg Davies |
| 194 | 6 | 30 October 2008 | Glenn Wool and Gabriella Cilmi | James Allan (Glasvegas), **James Corden** and Germaine Greer |
| 195 | 7 | 6 November 2008 (Note: In this episode, Simon dressed in a bunny costume to make the show more "family friendly" and keep his job at the BBC, mocking how the BBC had reacted to Russell Brand and Jonathan Ross scandal.) | Alexei Sayle and Lisa Maffia | Stine Bramsen (Alphabeat), **Jack Dee** and Anna Richardson |
| 196 | 8 | 13 November 2008 | Richard Herring and Lil' Chris | James Rushent (Does It Offend You, Yeah?), **Frank Skinner** and Melanie C (Spice Girls) |
| 197 | 9 | 20 November 2008 | Barunka O'Shaughnessy and Kelly Jones (Stereophonics) | Alesha Dixon, **Davina McCall** and Mitch Hewer |
| 198 | 10 | 27 November 2008 (Note: 198th Episode Special) | Matthew Wright and Mette Lindberg (The Asteroids Galaxy Tour) | Lee Ryan, **Mark Watson** and Katy Brand |
| 199 | 11 | 4 December 2008 | Arlene Phillips and Keith Murray (We Are Scientists) | Dappy (N-Dubz), **Dermot O'Leary** and Robert Webb |
| 200 | 12 | 11 December 2008 (Note: Simon Amstell final episode) | Heston Blumenthal and Grant Nicholas (Feeder) | Josh Groban, **Omid Djalili** and Martin Freeman |
| 201 | 13 | 16 January 2009 | Best of Series 22 | Best of Series 22 |

=== Series 23 (2009) ===
| No. overall | No. in series | Original air date | Guest host | Phill's team | Noel's team |
|---|---|---|---|---|---|
| 202 | 1 | 1 October 2009 | James Corden | Ben Miller and Paloma Faith | Tom Clarke (The Enemy) and Janeane Garofalo |
| 203 | 2 | 8 October 2009 | Rhod Gilbert | Greg Davies and Martin Kemp (Spandau Ballet) | Jeremy Reynolds (Hockey) and Gabby Logan |
| 204 | 3 | 15 October 2009 | Alex James (Blur) | Peter Serafinowicz and Jessica Origliasso (The Veronicas) | Newton Faulkner and Holly Walsh |
| 205 | 4 | 22 October 2009 | Jack Whitehall | Stephen Mangan and Rochelle Wiseman (The Saturdays) | Mr Hudson and Andrea McLean |
| 206 | 5 | 28 October 2009 (Note: From this episode, the show moved to Wednesday nights) | Frank Skinner | Jon Richardson and Calvin Harris | Tinchy Stryder and Fearne Cotton |
| 207 | 6 | 4 November 2009 | Claudia Winkleman | Harry Shearer (Spinal Tap) and Little Boots | Jamelia and Tom Basden |
| 208 | 7 | 11 November 2009 | Mark Watson | Donal MacIntyre and Daniel Merriweather | Shingai Shoniwa (Noisettes) and Tim Minchin |
| 209 | 8 | 18 November 2009 | Martin Freeman | Charlie Brooker and Dappy (N-Dubz) | Martha Wainwright and Simon Bird |
| 210 | 9 | 25 November 2009 | David Walliams | Andy Serkis and Gareth Malone | Basshunter and Josie Long |
| 211 | 10 | 2 December 2009 | Dermot O'Leary | Russell Tovey and Michael Ball | Aston Merrygold (JLS) and David O'Doherty |
| 212 | 11 | 9 December 2009 | Frankie Boyle | Richard Herring and Jon McClure (Reverend and The Makers) | DJ Ironik and Carol Vorderman |
| 213 | 12 | 16 December 2009 (Note: Doctor Who special) | David Tennant | Jo Whiley and Bernard Cribbins | Jamie Cullum and Catherine Tate |
| 214 | 13 | 23 December 2009 | – | Best of Series 23 | Best of Series 23 |

=== Series 24 (2010–11) ===
| No. overall | No. in series | Original air date | Guest host | Phill's team | Noel's team |
|---|---|---|---|---|---|
| 215 | 1 | 21 October 2010 | Mark Ronson | Alesha Dixon and Mollie King (The Saturdays) | Tinie Tempah and Paul Foot |
| 216 | 2 | 28 October 2010 | Catherine Tate | Katy Wix and Badly Drawn Boy | Tulisa (N-Dubz) and Howard Marks |
| 217 | 3 | 4 November 2010 | Jack Dee | Charlie Higson and Eliza Doolittle (Note: During the Identity Parade, Noel swapped teams with Phill for the rest of the show in order to give him the "Jedward experience". However, host Jack Dee still credited the victory to "Noel's old team.") | Jedward and Katy Brand (Note: Jedward temporarily swapped places with Identity Parade member Pat Sharp, who was made team captain for rest of the round.) |
| 218 | 4 | 11 November 2010 | Terry Wogan | Rufus Hound and James Blunt | Imelda May and Edith Bowman |
| 219 | 5 | 18 November 2010 (Note: This episode featured a running joke that it was originally supposed to be hosted by Colombian pop-sensation Shakira.) | David O'Doherty | Joe Wilkinson and Melanie Brown | Olly Murs and Peter Jones |
| 220 | 6 | 25 November 2010 | Tim Minchin | Jason Donovan and DJ Target (Roll Deep) | Paloma Faith and Tim Key |
| 221 | 7 | 2 December 2010 | Tim Westwood | Aston Merrygold, Oritsé Williams, Marvin Humes, JB Gill (all members of JLS), (Note: The episode started with Marvin Humes from JLS on Phill's team whilst the other members of the band sat on a "sub bench" to the side. Throughout the episode, whenever Tim Westwood set off an alarm, JLS had to substitute another member onto the panel. The entire band performed with Phill in the Intros round.) Holly Walsh | Russell Watson and Wiley (Note: During the Intros round, Pat Sharp joined Noel's team to make up for all of JLS joining up on Phill's team.) |
| 222 | 8 | 9 December 2010 | Lee Mack | Jon Richardson and Diana Vickers | Andrew Stone (Starman) and Irwin Sparkes (The Hoosiers) |
| 223 | 9 | 16 December 2010 | Juliette Lewis | Nick Grimshaw and Theo Hutchcraft (Hurts) | Kimberly Wyatt and Vic Reeves |
| 224 | 10 | 21 December 2010 | Josh Groban | Charlie Baker and Tinchy Stryder | Michael Ball and KT Tunstall |
| 225 | 11 | 30 December 2010 | Robert Webb | Andi Osho and Example | Cee Lo Green and Chris Packham |
| 226 | 12 | 3 January 2011 | Frankie Boyle | Miles Jupp and Goldie | Professor Green and Michelle Williams |
| 227 | 13 | 5 January 2011 | David O'Doherty | Best of Series 24 | Best of Series 24 |

=== Comic Relief special (2011) ===
| No. overall | Original air date | Guest host | Left team | Right team |
|---|---|---|---|---|
| – | 5 March 2011 (Note: Special episode webcast live as part of 24 Hour Panel People. David Walliams hosted and Neil Tennant and Robert Webb replaced Noel and Phill who were unavailable.) | David Walliams | Chris O'Dowd, **Neil Tennant** and Alexa Chung | Matt Edmondson, **Robert Webb** and Nick Grimshaw |

=== Series 25 (2011) ===
| No. overall | No. in series | Original air date | Guest host | Phill's team | Noel's team |
|---|---|---|---|---|---|
| 228 | 1 | 3 October 2011 | David Hasselhoff | Peter Serafinowicz and Loick Essien | Amelle Berrabah (Sugababes) and Louie Spence |
| 229 | 2 | 10 October 2011 | Jack Dee | Spencer Matthews and Alex James | Maverick Sabre and Seann Walsh |
| 230 | 3 | 17 October 2011 | Lorraine Kelly | Jarred Christmas and Professor Green | Stacey Solomon and Tony Law |
| 231 | 4 | 24 October 2011 (Note: The game ended in a draw, so a tiebreak game of "How Many Mobys Are There?" was played.) | Adam Buxton | Reggie Yates and Margaret Cho | Beverley Knight and Dynamo |
| 232 | 5 | 31 October 2011 | Will Young | Mark Watson and Sinitta | Paul Foot and Toddla T |
| 233 | 6 | 7 November 2011 | Greg Davies | Amy Childs, **Frankie Boyle** (Note: Frankie Boyle stood in for Phill Jupitus who was unable to attend the episode's recording) and Ian 'H' Watkins (Steps) | Tinchy Stryder and Holly Walsh |
| 234 | 7 | 14 November 2011 | Alice Cooper | Penny Smith and Wretch 32 | Olly Murs and Rufus Hound |
| 235 | 8 | 21 November 2011 | James Blunt | Matthew Crosby and Harry Judd (McFly) | Sean Paul and Sarah Millican |
| 236 | 9 | 28 November 2011 | Tinie Tempah | Chris Ramsey and Example | Pixie Lott and Joey Page |
| 237 | 10 | 5 December 2011 | Cilla Black | Tiffany Stevenson and Rizzle Kicks | Holly Willoughby and Angelos Epithemiou |
| 238 | 11 | 12 December 2011 | Rhod Gilbert | Charlie Baker and Tom Parker (The Wanted) | Jimmy Osmond and Caroline Flack |
| 239 | 12 | 19 December 2011 | John Barrowman | Jason Manford and Helen Skelton | Jason Derülo and Joe Wilkinson |
| 240 | 13 | 29 December 2011 | – | Best of Series 25 | Best of Series 25 |

=== Children in Need special (2011) ===
| No. overall | Original air date | Guest host | Phill's team | Noel's team |
|---|---|---|---|---|
| 241 | 18 November 2011 | Katy Brand | Arlene Phillips and Harry Judd (McFly) | Claire Richards (Steps) and Shaun Williamson |

=== Sport Relief special (2012) ===
| No. overall | Original air date | Guest host | Phill's team | Noel's team |
|---|---|---|---|---|
| 242 | 23 March 2012 | Jake Humphrey | Austin Healey and Louise Redknapp | Melanie C (Spice Girls) and Tim Lovejoy |

=== Series 26 (2012) ===
| No. overall | No. in series | Original air date | Guest host | Phill's team | Noel's team |
|---|---|---|---|---|---|
| 243 | 1 | 24 September 2012 | Kathy Burke | Sarah Millican and Fazer (N-Dubz) | Mark Hoppus (Blink-182) and Greg Rutherford |
| 244 | 2 | 1 October 2012 | Example | Rufus Hound and Wretch 32 | Lianne La Havas and Gareth Malone |
| 245 | 3 | 8 October 2012 | Jack Whitehall | Celia Pacquola and Danny Jones (McFly) | Mena Suvari and Paul Foot |
| 246 | 4 | 15 October 2012 (Note: This episode was styled as a "Radio DJs Special" and included guest appearances from Tony Blackburn, Mike Read and Pat Sharp sitting in the audience. The teams could play "Hey Mr DJ" cards throughout the show to ask them for help.) | Nick Grimshaw | Joe Lycett and Fred Macpherson (Spector) | Conor Maynard and Nancy Dell'Olio |
| 247 | 5 | 22 October 2012 | Lee Mack | Joe Wilkinson and Amy Macdonald | Lemar, **Professor Green** (Note: Professor Green stood in for Noel Fielding who was unable to attend the episode's recording.) and Chris Ramsey |
| 248 | 6 | 29 October 2012 | Ne-Yo | David O'Doherty and Delilah | Aiden Grimshaw and Stacey Solomon |
| 249 | 7 | 12 November 2012 (Note: The game ended in a draw, so a tiebreak question was asked where Ayoade described a musician and the teams had to buzz in. Crosby correctly answered Rick Astley, thus making Phill's team the winners.) | Richard Ayoade | Matthew Crosby and Shingai Shoniwa (Noisettes) | Ed Sheeran and Caroline Flack |
| 250 | 8 | 19 November 2012 (Note: 250th Episode Special; also included recurring appearances from Russell Grant throughout as part of a running joke that he had been passed over for the host's job.) | Richard Madeley | Andrew O'Neill and Maverick Sabre | Heidi Range (Sugababes) and Seann Walsh |
| 251 | 9 | 26 November 2012 | Alex Horne (Note: Horne was accompanied by his band, The Horne Section, who performed throughout the show.) | Josh Widdicombe and Louis Smith | Paloma Faith and Tony Law |
| 252 | 10 | 3 December 2012 | Stephen Mangan | Kayvan Novak and Michelle Heaton | Sway and Katherine Ryan |
| 253 | 11 | 10 December 2012 (Note: The game ended in a draw, leading to a round where the teams had to name as many famous Stevens as they could.) | Liza Tarbuck | Jameela Jamil and Labrinth | Rita Ora and Jason Manford |
| 254 | 12 | 17 December 2012 | – | Best of Series 26 | Best of Series 26 |
| 255 | 13 | 22 December 2012 | Bob Mortimer | Russell Tovey and Melanie C (Spice Girls) | DJ Fresh and Joey Page |

=== What a Load of Buzzcocks (2013) ===
| No. | Original air date | Year in Music |
|---|---|---|
| 1 | 3 June 2013 | 1996 |
| 2 | 10 June 2013 | 2004 |
| 3 | 17 June 2013 | 1998 |
| 4 | 24 June 2013 | 2006 |
| 5 | 1 July 2013 | 2001 |
| 6 | 8 July 2013 | 2007 |
| 7 | 15 July 2013 | 2000 |
| 8 | 22 July 2013 | 2008 |

=== Series 27 (2013) ===
| No. overall | No. in series | Original air date | Guest host | Phill's team | Noel's team |
|---|---|---|---|---|---|
| 256 | 1 | 23 September 2013 | John Hannah | Dave Myers and Aluna Francis (AlunaGeorge) | Felix Buxton (Basement Jaxx) and James Acaster |
| 257 | 2 | 30 September 2013 | Russell Howard | Stacey Solomon and Conor Maynard | Lethal Bizzle and Isy Suttie |
| 258 | 3 | 7 October 2013 | Peter Andre | Jason Gardiner and Ana Matronic (Scissor Sisters) | Charles Cave (White Lies) and Tony Law |
| 259 | 4 | 14 October 2013 | Sara Cox | Matt Richardson and Eliza Doolittle | Iggy Azalea and Jake Humphrey |
| 260 | 5 | 21 October 2013 | Kristen Schaal | David O'Doherty and Rylan Clark | James Arthur and Alice Levine |
| 261 | 6 | 28 October 2013 | Eamonn Holmes | Greg McHugh and Shaun Ryder (Happy Mondays) | Jaymi Hensley (Union J) and Sarah Millican |
| 262 | 7 | 4 November 2013 | Rizzle Kicks (Note: The first time more than one person hosted the show.) | Laura Whitmore and Huey Morgan (Fun Lovin' Criminals) (Note: Morgan smashed a coffee mug in the final round, apparently irritated by the hosts' jokes at his expense. He then walked off the show before the game had finished.) | Lissie and Paul Foot |
| 263 | 8 | 11 November 2013 (Note: Described as a "Sexy Special".) | Michael Bolton | Carol Vorderman and Diana Vickers | Shane Filan (Westlife) and Seann Walsh |
| 264 | 9 | 18 November 2013 | Jack Whitehall | Kriss Akabusi (Note: Akabusi filled in for Aston Merrygold, who pulled out at the last minute due to illness. Jack Whitehall jokingly referred to him as Aston and asked him questions about JLS' split.) and Katy B | Johnny Borrell (Razorlight) and Alex Brooker |
| 265 | 10 | 25 November 2013 (Note: The game ended in a draw, so a tiebreak question was asked where Redd Pepper described a musician and the teams had to buzz in. Willis correctly answered Justin Timberlake, thus making Phill's team the winners.) | Warwick Davis (Note: Movie Special.) | Emma Willis and Tom Fletcher (McFly) | Alfie Boe and Chris Ramsey |
| 266 | 11 | 2 December 2013 | Dizzee Rascal | Katherine Ryan and Jamie Cullum | Foxes and Aston Merrygold (JLS) |
| 267 | 12 | 9 December 2013 | Krishnan Guru-Murthy | Best of Series 27 | Best of Series 27 |
| 268 | 13 | 16 December 2013 | Johnny Vegas | Sara Pascoe and Brian McFadden (Westlife) | DJ Locksmith (Rudimental) and Jessica Hynes |

=== Series 28 (2014–15) ===
| No. overall | No. in series | Original air date | Phill's team | Noel's team |
|---|---|---|---|---|
| 269 | 1 | 29 September 2014 | Gabby Logan and Professor Green | Matthew Healy (The 1975) and Roisin Conaty |
| 270 | 2 | 6 October 2014 | Stacey Solomon and Ella Eyre | Harry Koisser (Peace) and Seann Walsh |
| 271 | 3 | 13 October 2014 | Sara Pascoe and John Cooper Clarke | Amelia Lily and Alex Brooker |
| 272 | 4 | 20 October 2014 | Kerry Godliman and Har Mar Superstar | Nicole Scherzinger and James Acaster |
| 273 | 5 | 3 November 2014 (Note: Delayed by a week due to a double bill of Intruders.) | Sara Cox and Adam Ant | Fuse ODG and Paul Foot |
| 274 | 6 | 10 November 2014 | Aisling Bea and Lisa Stansfield | Ana Matronic (Scissor Sisters) and Joe Lycett |
| 275 | 7 | 17 November 2014 | Sarah Millican and Lethal Bizzle | Michael Ball and Gemma Cairney |
| 276 | 8 | 24 November 2014 | Katherine Ryan and Charlie Simpson | Paloma Faith and Loyd Grossman |
| 277 | 9 | 1 December 2014 | Rob Beckett and Grace Chatto (Clean Bandit) (Note: For the Identity Parade round for Phill's team, the drummer from Bad Manners who had been booked to appear had got the wrong day. Therefore, while Phill's team were blindfolded, Rhod had to get a band member (Ian Leigh from Dr Zero & The Hotheads) and five other people from the audience to replace the line-up.) | Charli XCX and Phil Daniels |
| 278 | 10 | 8 December 2014 | Romesh Ranganathan and Jake Roche & Charley Bagnall (both of Rixton) | Van McCann (Catfish and the Bottlemen) and Kym Marsh (Hear'Say) |
| 279 | 11 | 15 December 2014 | Yasmine Akram and Rumer (Note: After Noel's team's Identity Parade, former The Clash drummer Terry Chimes joined Phill's team for the rest of the show.) | Steve Aoki and Bobby Mair |
| 280 | 12 | 22 December 2014 | Lloyd Langford and Louis Walsh | Melissa Steel and Glen Matlock (Sex Pistols) |
| 281 | 13 | 15 January 2015 | Best of Series 28 | Best of Series 28 |

=== Series 29 — Sky series 1 (2021) ===
This was the first series of the show's revival on Sky Max.

| No. overall | No. in series | Original air date | Daisy's team | Noel's team |
|---|---|---|---|---|
| 282 | 1 | 21 September 2021 | Anne-Marie and Jade Thirlwall (Little Mix) | Jamali Maddix and Nish Kumar |
| 283 | 2 | 28 September 2021 | Ellie Goulding and Tom Grennan | Jamali Maddix and Yungblud |
| 284 | 3 | 5 October 2021 | Jamali Maddix and Mollie King (The Saturdays) | Richard Ayoade and Majestic |
| 285 | 4 | 12 October 2021 | Jamali Maddix and Ella Henderson | Mike Wozniak and Jax Jones |
| 286 | 5 | 19 October 2021 | Aitch and Joe Wilkinson | Jamali Maddix and Self Esteem |
| 287 | 6 | 26 October 2021 | Jamali Maddix and Rag'n'Bone Man | Maisie Adam and Ms Banks |
| 288 | 7 | 2 November 2021 | Bez and Shaun Ryder (both of Happy Mondays and Black Grape) | Jamali Maddix and Desiree Burch |
| 289 | 8 | 15 December 2021 | Lauren Laverne and Asim Chaudhry | Jamali Maddix and Holly Johnson (Frankie Goes to Hollywood) |

=== Series 30 — Sky series 2 (2022) ===
Jamali was moved to Noel's team for every episode.

| No. overall | No. in series | Original air date | Daisy's team | Noel and Jamali's team |
|---|---|---|---|---|
| 290 | 1 | 14 September 2022 | Nile Rodgers (Chic) and Russell Howard | Mae Muller |
| 291 | 2 | 21 September 2022 | James Bay and Roisin Conaty | ArrDee |
| 292 | 3 | 28 September 2022 | Tom Davis and Joy Crookes | Serge Pizzorno (Kasabian) |
| 293 | 4 | 5 October 2022 | Rosie Jones and Shaggy | Example |
| 294 | 5 | 12 October 2022 | Lethal Bizzle and James Buckley | Maisie Peters |
| 295 | 6 | 19 October 2022 (Note: Noel was absent from this episode due to illness; Jamali served as team captain in his absence.) | Kerry Godliman and Martin Kemp (Spandau Ballet) | Loyle Carner and James Acaster |
| 296 | 7 | 26 October 2022 (Note: Episodes seven and eight were brought forward a week due to Lady Leshurr being charged with actual bodily harm after a 22 October 2022 incident; the episode was postponed and then cancelled and remains unavailable.) | Michelle de Swarte and Krept and Konan | Johnny Borrell (Razorlight) |
| 297 | 8 | 2 November 2022 | Ian Broudie (The Lightning Seeds) and Hannah Waddingham | Melanie Blatt (All Saints) |
| 298 | 9 | 15 December 2022 | Tom Allen and Pete Doherty (The Libertines, Babyshambles) | Claire Richards (Steps) |
| 299 | 10 | Unaired | Joel Corry and Joel Dommett | Lady Leshurr |

=== Series 31 — Sky series 3 (2023) ===
| No. overall | No. in series | Original air date | Daisy's team | Noel and Jamali's team |
|---|---|---|---|---|
| 300 | 1 | 23 August 2023 (Note: This episode featured a surprise performance by three members of Blue (Antony Costa, Duncan James and Simon Webbe).) | Danny Jones (McFly) and Alex Brooker | Nova Twins |
| 301 | 2 | 30 August 2023 | Gregory Porter and Amy Gledhill | Chesney Hawkes |
| 302 | 3 | 6 September 2023 | CMAT and Calum Scott | Sam Campbell |
| 303 | 4 | 13 September 2023 | Jake Shears (Scissor Sisters) and Jamie-Lee O'Donnell | Stefflon Don |
| 304 | 5 | 20 September 2023 | Judi Love and Benji Webbe (Skindred) | Paloma Faith |
| 305 | 6 | 27 September 2023 | Dermot Kennedy and Billy Porter | Róisín Murphy (Moloko) |
| 306 | 7 | 4 October 2023 | Suggs (Madness) and Katherine Ryan | Talia Mar |
| 307 | 8 | 11 October 2023 | Phil Wang and Jordan Stephens (Rizzle Kicks) | Ashnikko |
| 308 | 9 | 18 October 2023 | Kiell Smith-Bynoe and Danny Goffey (Supergrass, Babyshambles) | Freya Ridings |
| 309 | 10 | 19 December 2023 (Note: This episode also featured appearances by DJ Luck & MC Neat; Tommy Banner and Pete Budd (of The Wurzels); Ollie Georgiou and Melo-D (Blazin' Squad); Paul Potts; Cheryl Baker, Mike Nolan and Jay Aston (The Fizz) and Ritchie Neville and Scott Robinson (5ive).) | Ricky Wilson (Kaiser Chiefs) and Harry Hill | Leigh-Anne (Little Mix) |

=== Series 32 — Sky series 4 (2024) ===
Daisy May Cooper did not appear in any episode except for the Christmas special; she was replaced by Sophie Willan as team captain in five of the episodes. The other four episodes had a theme (episodes being titled Never Mind the Buzzcocks Does…), with guest captains taking Willan's place.

| No. overall | No. in series | Original air date | Buzzcocks Does | Sophie's/Guest captain's team | Noel and Jamali's team |
|---|---|---|---|---|---|
| 310 | 1 | 16 October 2024 | Rock | Abi Harding (The Zutons), **Courtney Love** (Hole), Joel Dommett | Glen Matlock (Sex Pistols) |
| 311 | 2 | 23 October 2024 | — | Susan Wokoma, Nelly Furtado | AJ Tracey |
| 312 | 3 | 30 October 2024 | The Nineties | Julian Clary, **Mel B** (Spice Girls), Sister Bliss (Faithless) | Alex James (Blur) |
| 313 | 4 | 6 November 2024 | — | Lucy Beaumont, Naughty Boy | Kate Nash |
| 314 | 5 | 13 November 2024 | Girl & Boy Bands | Sam Campbell, **Perrie Edwards** (Little Mix), Duncan James (Blue) | Bradley Simpson (The Vamps) |
| 315 | 6 | 20 November 2024 | — | DJ Target (Roll Deep), Harriet Kemsley | Pete Doherty (Babyshambles, The Libertines), Carl Barât (The Libertines) |
| 316 | 7 | 27 November 2024 | — | John Kearns, Charlie Simpson (Busted, Fightstar) | Pixie Lott |
| 317 | 8 | 4 December 2024 | The 00s | Nick Grimshaw, **Beth Ditto** (The Gossip), Megaman (So Solid Crew) | Kimberly Wyatt (The Pussycat Dolls) |
| 318 | 9 | 11 December 2024 | — | Joel Corry, Joe Wilkinson | Self Esteem |
| 319 | 10 (Note: Jona Lewie joined Daisy's team for the last two rounds. Boney M sang at the end.) | 18 December 2024 | — | Chris Ramsey, **Daisy May Cooper**, Ella Henderson | Jordan North |

=== Series 33 — Sky series 5 (2025) ===
The fifth Sky season followed a similar format to the fourth, with Sophie Willan as team captain in five of the episodes and three having themes (Never Mind the Buzzcocks Does…), with guest captains.

| No. overall | No. in series | Original air date | Buzzcocks Does | Sophie's/Guest captain's team | Noel and Jamali's team |
|---|---|---|---|---|---|
| 320 | 1 | 7 October 2025 | Madchester v. Britpop | Clint Boon (Inspiral Carpets), **Bez** (The Happy Mondays, Black Grape), Jamali Maddix (Note: Jamali was on the guest captain's team in this episode.) | Patsy Kensit, Danny Goffey (Supergrass) |
| 321 | 2 | 14 October 2025 | — | Natasha Bedingfield, Sam Ryder | Ritchie Neville, Scott Robinson, Sean Conlon, Abz Love, Jason "J" Brown (all members of 5ive) |
| 322 | 3 | 21 October 2025 | The 1980s | Martin Fry (ABC), **Pepsi & Shirlie**, Judi Love | Debbie Gibson |
| 323 | 4 | 28 October 2025 | — | Jon Richardson, Tinie Tempah | Mimi Webb |
| 324 | 5 | 4 November 2025 | — | Luke Pritchard (The Kooks), Jamie Demetriou | PinkPantheress |
| 325 | 6 | 11 November 2025 | 1990s Pop | Keith Duffy and Shane Lynch (Boyzone), **Melanie Blatt** (All Saints), Tom Davis | Betty Boo |
| 326 | 7 | 18 November 2025 | — | Chris McCausland, Tom Grennan | Nadine Coyle (Girls Aloud) |
| 327 | 8 | 18 December 2025 | — | Matt Goss (Bros), Guz Khan | Jessie J |

=== Series 34 — Sky series 6 (2026) ===
Neither Willan nor Cooper will appear. Sky Max has been shut down, so the show will move to the relaunched Sky One. Episodes were recorded at Television Centre, London on 5 and 7 October 2026. There will be two Christmas specials.

| No. overall | No. in series | Original air date | Title | Guest captain's team | Noel and Jamali's team |
|---|---|---|---|---|---|
| 328 | 1 | 2026 | TBA | TBA | TBA |
| 329 | 2 | 2026 | TBA | TBA | TBA |
| 330 | 3 | 2026 | TBA | TBA | TBA |
| 331 | 4 | 2026 | TBA | TBA | TBA |
| 332 | 5 | 2026 | TBA | TBA | TBA |
| 333 | 6 | 2026 | TBA | TBA | TBA |
| 334 | 7 | December 2026 | "Never Mind the Christmas Buzzcocks" | **Kelly Osbourne** | TBA |
| 335 | 8 | December 2026 | "The Hangover" | **Alesha Dixon** (Mis-Teeq) | TBA |

== Scores ==
=== BBC Series (1996 - 2015) ===
| Phill | Sean | Bill | Guests | Noel |
|---|---|---|---|---|
Series wins (6 drawn)
| 12 | 13 | | | |
| 12 | 2 | 7 | 1 | 3 |
Episode wins (18 drawn)
| 127 | 132 | | | |
| 127 | 39 | 47 | 9 | 37 |

=== Sky Max / Sky One (2021 - present) ===
| Daisy | Sophie | Noel |
|---|---|---|
Series wins (0 drawn)
| 3 | | 2 |
| 3 | 0 | 2 |
Episode wins (6 drawn)
| 21 | | 18 |
| 15 | 6 | 18 |
