= Goes Without Saying =

Goes Without Saying may refer to:

- "Goes Without Saying", a song by Old Dominion from the album Old Dominion (album)
- "Goes Without Saying", a song by Post Malone featuring Brad Paisley from the album F-1 Trillion

== See also ==
- It Goes Without Saying
