= Values and Virtues =

Values And Virtues

EP by Josh Doyle
- Released: May 20, 2009
- Recorded: 2008
- Genre: Alternative rock
- Length: 19:52
- Label: GBR

Josh Doyle chronology
The End Of Fear (2004)	Values And Virtues (2009)

Professional ratings
Review scores
Source	Rating
Cross Rhythms	(9/10)

Values And Virtues is an EP by former Dum Dums vocalist Josh Doyle.

== Track listing ==
1. "High School Soldier" - 3:50
2. "Ghosts Like You" - 4:18
3. "Pop Idol" - 2:55
4. "Waiting For The Payoff" - 4:46
5. "Concrete Moon" - 4:03

=== Middletown Bonus Tracks ===
6. "Middletown" - 3:24
7. "Two Lines Instead Of One" - 3:36
8. "This Transcendant Ache" - 3:25
9. "My Jerusalem" - 3:53
10. "Waiting For The Payoff (Acoustic)" - 4:18
11. "Jericho" - 3:24
12. "Damaged Goods" - 4:17
13. "Army Of Two (Acoustic)" - 4:08
14. "Concrete Moon (Acoustic)" - 4:56

== Credits ==
- Written by Josh Doyle
- Track 2, 4 & 5 produced by Justin Saunders
- Track 1 & 3 produced and mixed by Joe Baldridge
- Track 2, 4 & 5 mixed by John Castelli
- Mastered by Steve Wilson
- Artwork & design by Shaun Gordon
- Vocals & guitar by Josh Doyle
- Additional guitars by Mark Hamilton, Justin Saunders & Jason Moore
- Bass by Jordan Hester, Beau Burtnick, Tony Lucido & Josh Fink
- Drums by Paul Evans, Doy Gardner & Joshua Moore
- Backing vocals by Jason Moore
- Cello by Justin Saunders
