= The End of Fear =

EP by Josh Doyle
- Released: October 24, 2004
- Recorded: 2004
- Genre: Alternative rock
- Length: 25:25
- Label: GBR

Josh Doyle chronology
The Barnroom Sessions (2002)	The End of Fear (2004)	Values and Virtues (2009)

Professional ratings
Review scores
Source	Rating
Cross Rhythms	9/10 stars

The End of Fear is an EP by Dum Dums vocalist Josh Doyle.

== Track listing ==
1. "The End of Fear" - 4:02
2. "Aphrodite" - 4:13
3. "Boyracer" - 5:04
4. "Solarstorm" - 4:15
5. "Become Beautiful" - 7:55
  - Contains the hidden track "Boyracer Ringtone".

== Credits ==
- Written by Josh Doyle
- Produced by Sam Shacklock
- All guitars and vocals by Josh Doyle
- All beats, bass and synths by Sam Shacklock
- Photography by Josh Doyle & Jenny Doyle
- Mastered by Richard Dodd
