= You Do Something to Me =

You Do Something to Me may refer to:

- You Do Something to Me (Cole Porter song)
- You Do Something to Me (Dum Dums song)
- You Do Something to Me (Paul Weller song)
