= Can't Get You Out of My Thoughts =

2000 single by Dum Dums

Single by Dum Dums

from the album It Goes Without Saying
- Released: 26 June 2000 (UK)
- Recorded: 2000
- Genre: Pop rock
- Label: Wildstar Records Ltd
- Songwriter(s): Josh Doyle
- Producer(s): Steve Power

Dum Dums singles chronology
"Everything" (2000)	"Can't Get You Out of My Thoughts" (2000)	"You Do Something to Me" (2000)

"Can't Get You Out of My Thoughts" is a song by Dum Dums, released as their second single in 2000. It was also included on their album It Goes Without Saying.

== Track listing ==
CD1

(Released June 26, 2000)

1. "Can't Get You Out of My Thoughts" - 3:10
2. "Boyband" - 4:18
3. "Plastic Flowers" - 4:24

CD2

(Released June 26, 2000)

1. "Can't Get You Out of My Thoughts" - 3:10
2. "All Hooked Up on You" - 3:36
3. "Equal Spread of Sunshine" - 4:23
4. "Can't Get You Out of My Thoughts (Video)"

== Chart performance ==
"Can't Get You Out of My Thoughts" entered the UK Singles Chart the week of 26-06-2000 at #18.

Chart (2000)	Peak Position
UK Singles Chart	18
