= Army of Two (Dum Dums song) =

2001 single by Dum Dums

Single by Dum Dums

from the album It Goes Without Saying
- Released: 5 February 2001 (UK)
- Recorded: 2000
- Genre: Pop rock
- Label: Wildstar
- Songwriter(s): Josh Doyle
- Producer(s): Steve Power

Dum Dums singles chronology
"You Do Something to Me" (2000)	"Army of Two" (2001)

"Army of Two" is a song by Dum Dums, released as their fourth single in 2001. It was also included on their album It Goes Without Saying.

== Track listing ==
CD1

(Released February 5, 2001)

1. "Army of Two (radio edit)" - 3:35
2. "You Want It You Got It" - 3:52
3. "Until My Ship Comes In (The Grey Back mix)" - 3:38

CD2

(Released February 5, 2001)

1. "Army of Two (radio edit)" - 3:39
2. "Who Knows the Way" - 2:49
3. "You Knock Me Off My Feet (Live at Birmingham NEC)" - 3:52
4. "Army of Two (video)"

== Chart performance ==
"Army of Two" entered the UK Singles Chart at number 27 in the week of 5 February 2001.

Chart (2000)	Peak position
UK Singles Chart	27
