= Everything (Dum Dums song) =

2000 song by Dum Dums

Single by Dum Dums

from the album It Goes Without Saying
- Released: 28 February 2000 (UK)
- Recorded: 2000
- Genre: Pop rock
- Label: Wildstar Records Ltd
- Songwriter(s): Josh Doyle, Steve Clarke, and Stuart 'Baxter' Wilkinson
- Producer(s): Steve Power

Dum Dums singles chronology
"Everything" (2000)	"Can't Get You Out Of My Thoughts" (2000)

"Everything" is a song by Dum Dums, released as their debut single in 2000. It was also included on their album It Goes Without Saying.

== Track listing ==
=== CD1 ===
1. "Everything" - 2:47
2. "You Knock Me Off My Feet" - 3:14
3. "Losing Your Mind" - 3:18

=== CD2 ===
1. "Everything" - 2:47
2. "Mr. Executive" - 3:11
3. "Lucy's About To Beach" - 2:20
4. "Everything (Video)"

== Chart performance ==
"Everything" entered the UK Singles Chart the week of 28-02-2000 at #21.

Chart (2000)	Peak Position
UK Singles Chart	21
