= Candi Carpenter =

American musician

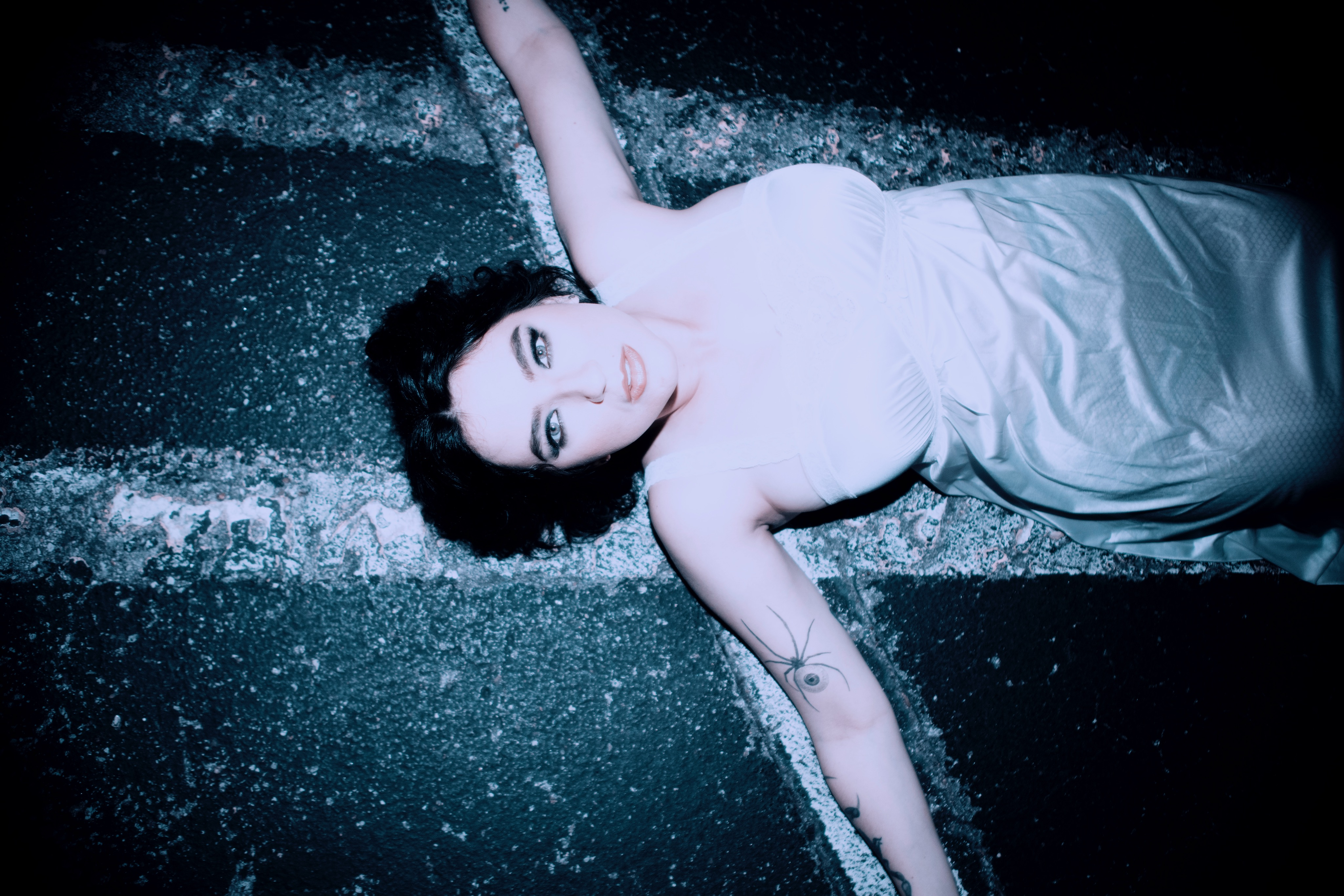
- Candi Carpenter

Background information
- Born: Candace Carpenter; Toledo, Ohio, U.S.
- Origin: Nashville, Tennessee, U.S.
- Genres: Alt-pop; indie pop; indie rock; alternative
- Occupations: Singer; songwriter
- Instruments: Vocals; guitar
- Years active: 2016-present
- Labels: Sony Music Nashville, A Frame Records, Corpse In Training
- Formerly of: Church of Roswell
- Website: candicarpenter.com

Candace "Candi" Carpenter is an American singer-songwriter who was born in Toledo, Ohio but raised in Lansing, Michigan. Carpenter made their musical debut in 2017 with the single "Burn the Bed", released through Sony Music Nashville. Jonathan Keefe of Country Universe rated the single "A-", praising Carpenter's "smoky" voice and the detail of the lyrics.

In 2024, Carpenter released their alt-pop debut, Demonology, a full-length album produced by Carpenter, Peter Shurkin, and Alden Witt. The music centers around highly personal stories of growing up in the Midwest and leaving Christianity. After years of performing as a country and Americana artist, this release was a sonic and thematic departure.

Carpenter was previously in Church of Roswell with former Dums-Dums singer songwriter Josh Doyle, the project released a 5 track ep titled Here Comes Church of Roswell in 2021.

== Personal life ==
Carpenter is non-binary and uses they/them pronouns. Carpenter is autistic.

== Chart positions ==
=== Singles ===
Year	Single	Peak chart positions	Album
Year	Single	US Country Airplay	Album
2016	"Burn the Bed"	56	Non-album single
2021	"Dirt Around the Tree"	—	Non-album single
2021	"When the Asteroid Comes"	—	Non-album single
2022	"Exorcist"	—	Demonology
2023	"Novels About Vampires"	—	Demonology
2023	"Nervous System"	—	Demonology
2023	"Seasonal Depression"	—	Non-album single
2024	"Tooth"	—	Demonology
2025	"American God"	—	Biblically Accurate Angel
2025	"The Fear of Being Human Remains"	—	Biblically Accurate Angel
2025	"Friday Night"	—	Non-album single
2026	"Inside the Simulation"	—	Biblically Accurate Angel
2026	"Little Freak"	—	Biblically Accurate Angel
2026	"Biblically Accurate Angel"	—	Biblically Accurate Angel
"—" denotes releases that did not chart
