= Junior Simpson =

British comedian

Junior Simpson is a retired British stand-up comedian of Jamaican descent. He was born in Leagrave, a suburb of Luton, and was educated at Beechwood Primary School and Challney High School for Boys.

Simpson headlines at clubs across Britain as well as performing in South Africa and Australia on a regular basis. He has performed at festivals all over the world including at the Reading Festival, Brighton Festival and Edinburgh Festival Fringe. He has also had numerous television and radio appearances including Lily Savage's Blankety Blank, Richard & Judy, Never Mind The Buzzcocks and The 11 O'Clock Show. He has also been a warm-up artist for many television shows including I'm Alan Partridge and Dead Ringers. He is represented by Glorious Management.

He appeared on Top Gear with Richard Hammond, testing the Cadillac Escalade. He also appeared in CBBCs School of Silence, as Mr Les Prance, and in Love Actually as the wedding DJ. He appeared on episode 116 of The Joe Rogan Experience podcast with Joe Rogan and Russell Peters. He is the voice of Lizard from Tinga Tinga Tales.

Junior Simpson married singer Emma Ruth in May 2022.
