= Sean's Show =

British TV sitcom (1992–1993)

- Title card
- Created by: Sean Hughes
- Written by: Sean Hughes; Nick Whitby
- Directed by: Sylvie Boden
- Starring: Sean Hughes; Victor McGuire; Jeff Shankley; Michael Troughton; John Barrard; Eileen Way
- Country of origin: United Kingdom
- Original language: English
- No. of series: 2
- No. of episodes: 14

Production
- Executive producer: Mike Bolland
- Producer: Katie Lander
- Running time: 30 minutes

Original release
- Network: Channel 4
- Release: 15 April 1992 – 29 December 1993

Sean's Show is a British television sitcom, first broadcast on Channel 4 between 15 April 1992 and 29 December 1993. Stand-up comedian Sean Hughes co-wrote and starred as a fictionalised version of himself, aware that he is living in a sitcom. The show's style drew heavily on It's Garry Shandling's Show (1986–90).

It received a nomination for the 1992 British Comedy Award for Best Channel 4 Sitcom.

== Production ==
The first series ended with the entire main cast other than Sean killed off in various ways. When he was granted a second series, he was forced to resurrect them all in the first episode.

== Episodes ==
=== Series 1 ===
Series one is based around Sean's life on a set much like his home in Muswell Hill. He pursues his love Susan while avoiding Angela "who I did not lead on". In the last episode, all of the cast bar Sean are killed off.

No. overall	No. in series	Title	Original release date
1	1	"Jelly and Blizzards"	15 April 1992
Windsor Davies pops around and sets a lot of jelly in his bath and Angela—a girl Sean cannot stand—will be moving in.
2	2	"Badgers"	22 April 1992
Due to a deeply embarrassing night out with his best friend Tony, Sean has discovered that a woman is lying, snoring, in his bed.
3	3	"Autobiography"	29 April 1992
Life looks good for Sean. He gets it together with his girlfriend Susan, he writes a best-selling book and gets to be interviewed by Tracey MacLeod from The Late Show.
4	4	"Greek Holiday"	6 May 1992
Whilst Sean is on holiday in Greece—falling in love with Alexi—his best friend Tony has to fill in for him. This turns out to be a disaster as Tony falls madly in love with Susan, the woman Sean loves.
5	5	"Gordon"	13 May 1992
Sean discovers that he has a twelve-year-old son called Gordon who demands £175 a week for sweets. He later finds out that Gordon is not actually his son. Sean finds out that his father is dying. Under the bed in the spare room are five musicians.
6	6	"Blind Date"	20 May 1992
Sean decides to take control of his pathetic life, and writes the script himself. Inevitably, he throws a party for his beloved Susan in an attempt to win her heart.
7	7	"Disappointed from Dublin"	27 May 1992
The final show of the series and it is Sean's last chance to get together with Susan. Or is it too late?

=== Series 2 ===
In series two Sean owns a house in Chelsea "near the football stadium" (a recurring gag is Sean hitting back footballs, occasionally for Crystal Palace F.C.), with his killed off co-stars resurrected as identical twins of their characters. Running jokes include a spider that is the reincarnation of Elvis Presley, cleaning scrambled eggs off a plate, and Bosnian refugees in his spare room.

No. overall	No. in series	Title	Original release date
8	1	"Fear Itself"	17 November 1993
A year has passed and Sean has moved to Chelsea—the Stamford Bridge not the Sloane Square end—with a ferocious dog and a couple of Bosnian refugee telly addicts. Special guests: Pulp and Bea Arthur.
9	2	"I'm Watching"	24 November 1993
It has been a bad week for Sean Hughes. Bobby the Builder presents Sean with a £7,000 phone bill and Tony persuades him to watch a sophisticated sex video which incurs the wrath of God. God sends Brother Shaw (Brian Cox) to sort him out but Shaw organises a party instead. Can Sean score or has he forgotten how?
10	3	"Don't Eat Meat"	1 December 1993
Love is in the air when Sean meets Lizzie (Joanna Riding) at the garage where he works. Will romance blossom, or will Elvis the spider and the death of Bobby the Builder foil his plans?
11	4	"Tea With Agatha"	8 December 1993
Who killed Bobby the Builder? Sean's night of passion with Lizzie has been rudely interrupted by 'Bill' and 'Ben', two policemen. Was the murderer Lizzie (who turns out to be Bobby's daughter)? Or Barry, Lizzie's lover? Or is—gasp, horror—the killer Sean himself?
12	5	"Great Socks"	15 December 1993
Sean has met Trudy (Meera Syal) and, determined to prove his days of one-night stands are over, he has asked her to move in with him. But he faces an emotional dilemma: she wants a baby. Fast! Is Sean ready? And why is Vinnie Jones there? Special guest: Vinnie Jones.
13	6	"Sean's Show"	22 December 1993
Sean, Tony and Barry are in hospital, and each of them has a very different memory of Sean and Trudy's dinner party. But only Mrs Pebbles knows the full truth.
14	7	"Sean's Show"	29 December 1993
It is the final episode and Sean must face some grim realities. Trudy has left him, he discovers he was adopted and God tells him he is thinking of packing it all in. Are his friends mere metaphors, can Palace win, and is the Cure's Robert Smith his real, long-lost mother? Special guests: the Cure, Chris Armstrong, Chris Coleman, Gareth Southgate, Andy Woodman.

== Home media ==
Sean's Show: The Complete First Series was released on DVD in October 2007.
