= Sean Hughes (comedian) =

Irish-British comedian, writer and actor (1965–2017)

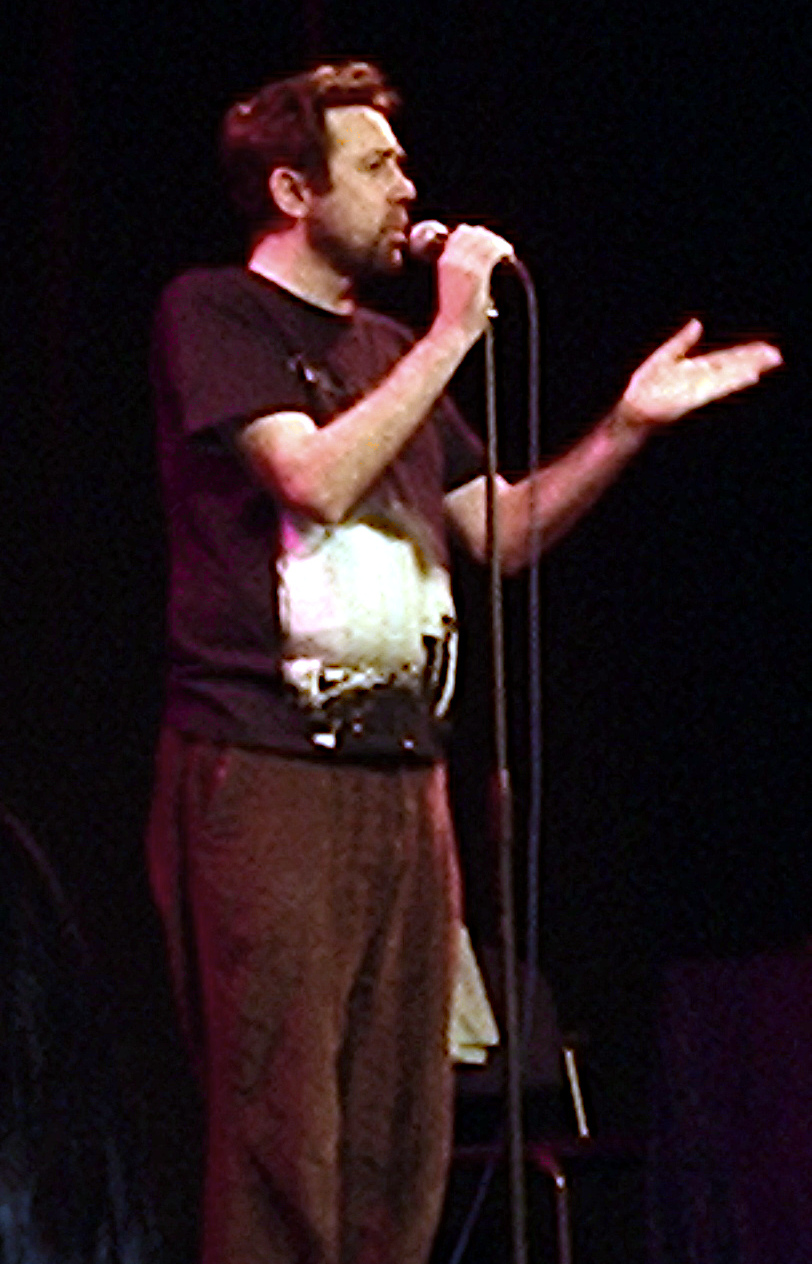
- Hughes in 2009
- Born: 10 November 1965; Archway, London, England
- Died: 16 October 2017 (aged 51); Archway, London, England
- Education: Coláiste Éanna, Dublin
- Notable work: Sean's Show; Never Mind the Buzzcocks; The Last Detective

Comedy career
- Years active: 1987–2017
- Website: seanhughes.co.uk

Sean Hughes (10 November 1965 – 16 October 2017) was a British-born Irish comedian, writer and actor. He starred in his own Channel 4 television show Sean's Show and was one of the regular team captains on the BBC Two musical panel game Never Mind the Buzzcocks.

== Early life ==
Hughes was born the middle boy in a family of three boys in Whittington Hospital in Archway, North London. His mother was from Cork and his father from Dublin. At the age of six, Hughes moved to Dublin and lived with his paternal grandmother in Firhouse, where he spent most of his youth. He attended Coláiste Éanna secondary school in Ballyroan.

Writing in The Guardian, Bruce Dessau observed of Hughes's early years:

[He] used to talk about how sounding like a Cockney in an Irish school was not easy. He later quipped that he spent "most of my childhood in a headlock". Not surprisingly his Mary Poppins accent soon developed a lilting local burr. Making schoolfriends laugh was a classic defence mechanism and he even set up comedy gigs at his school. What started out as a hobby quickly became a career.

== Career ==
In 1987, he began appearing at the Comedy Store. In 1990, aged 24, he became the youngest winner of the prestigious Perrier Comedy Award for his show A One-Night Stand with Sean Hughes.

He marked his 30th birthday with the Sean Hughes Is Thirty Somehow tour, which was broadcast on Channel 4, in 1995. Hughes returned to stand-up, touring the UK and Australia in 2007 with his show The Right Side of Wrong.

As well as comedy, he wrote collections of prose and poetry and worked on a number of films. He presented weekend radio shows on the BBC's London radio station BBC GLR, and in 2002 joined BBC 6 Music, presenting the Sunday-morning programme. He left the station a year after its launch, proclaiming it had turned into everything he had wanted it to be. He wrote two novels, The Detainees (1998) and It's What He Would Have Wanted (2000).

It was reported Hughes was a close friend of the American comedian Bill Hicks, but Hughes stated this was not true. In a 2014 interview, he explained: "It says on my Wikipedia page that I was good friends with him. I wasn't! We were in Australia together, so we hung out. I did get to know him a little bit, which was a real pleasure. When I saw him I just went, 'That's the best comic I'm going to see in my lifetime.'" Nevertheless, Hughes wrote the foreword to Cynthia True's biography of Hicks, American Scream: The Bill Hicks Story. He concluded his foreword by writing "being a genius is a heavy burden and he's the only one I'm ever likely to meet. I still miss you Bill."

== Film and television ==
Hughes had a small role in the film The Commitments (1991), playing a record producer.

In 1992, he had his own TV show, Sean's Show, ostensibly set in his own home. It received a nomination for the 1992 British Comedy Award for Best Channel 4 Sitcom. Series one of Sean's Show has been released on DVD. Later, he recorded a series of brief programmes called Sean's Shorts, in which he toured England, visiting many of the country's towns and cities, seeing local places of interest and meeting local people. He appeared in the film Snakes and Ladders shot in Dublin, and released in 1996.

From 1996 to 2002, he was a team captain on the BBC2 comedy quiz show Never Mind the Buzzcocks, alongside Phill Jupitus and Mark Lamarr. He can be seen during Terrorvision's music video for their single "Tequila" from 1999 and in the video for The Cure's 1996 single "The 13th". He appeared in the 2010 Edinburgh Fringe.

Hughes voiced Tapir in the Robbie the Reindeer trilogy.

In ITV's series The Last Detective, featuring "Dangerous" Davies, Hughes played Davies' friend, the perpetually unemployed and well-read "Mod Lewis" who spends all his time at the library to save on heating. He played Eileen Grimshaw's love interest Pat in the British soap Coronation Street.

Between 2002 and 2005, Hughes voiced Finbar the clockwork Shark, one of seven living plastic bath toys in the Cbeebies children's television series Rubbadubbers.

He played Sergeant Lake in the ITV Agatha Christie's Marple production of They Do It with Mirrors, which was broadcast on 1 January 2010.

Hughes played Brendan in the film version of Tony Hawks' book Round Ireland with a Fridge (2010). He played the lead in the film adaptation of Spike Milligan's comic novel, Puckoon, and he voiced Tapir in the three Robbie the Reindeer films.

He appeared in Casualty in 2015.

== Stage and online ==
In early 2014, Hughes started a podcast called Under the Radar, which ran for approximately 57 episodes (excluding repeats and split episodes) until December 2016.

Hughes took over the role of stationmaster Mr Perks in The Railway Children at King's Cross Theatre in March 2015.

== Personal life ==
Hughes was a vegetarian and proponent of animal rights. He was a heavy drinker for most of his career. In 2012, he became teetotal. He started drinking again before he died, saying: "Apparently I’m tedious when sober".

== Death ==
Hughes died in 2017, aged 51, from cirrhosis. He had been admitted to Whittington Hospital in North London, the same hospital in which he was born.

A funeral service was held at St Pancras and Islington Cemetery. After eulogies to his memory, extracts of Hughes' poetry were recited, and recorded music from the Smiths and Lily Allen was played. His body was cremated and a wake was held in a nearby pub.

Hughes left his £4million estate to the homeless charity Shelter. However, due to uncertainties surrounding the wording in Hughes' will which was made without legal assistance, it required intervention from the High Court and the drawn-out legal issue lasted nearly ten years. In March 2026, a judge ruled that Hughes' properties should be given to charity. In a statement his family said they were "immensely proud" and "delighted to confirm his bequest to Shelter."

== Works ==
=== Shows ===
- Mumbo Jumbo
- Penguins
- Life Becomes Noises
- Ducks and Other Mistakes I've Made
- What I Meant to Say Was...
- The Right Side of Wrong
- Live... And Seriously Funny
- A One Night Stand with Sean Hughes

=== Books ===
- Sean's Book (1993) ISBN 978-1-85793-145-7
- The Grey Area (1995) ISBN 978-1-85793-465-6
- The Detainees (1998) ISBN 978-0-684-82081-1
- It's What He Would Have Wanted (2000) ISBN 978-0-7432-0159-9
- My Struggle to Be Decent and Poems of Sadness and Light ISBN 978-1-908067-09-8

=== Music ===
- Bubonique – 20 Golden Showers (1993)
- Bubonique – Trance Arse Vol 3 (1995)
- Sly Curl – Cinerama (2002) – Hughes performs a poem at the end of the song
