= You Do Something to Me (Dum Dums song) =

2000 single by Dum Dums

"You Do Something To Me"

Single by Dum Dums

from the album It Goes Without Saying
- Released: 11 September 2000 (UK)
- Recorded: 2000
- Genre: Pop rock
- Label: Wildstar Records Ltd
- Producer(s): Steve Power

Dum Dums singles chronology
"Can't Get You Out Of My Thoughts" (2000)	"You Do Something To Me" (2000)	"Army Of Two" (2001)

"You Do Something To Me" is a song by Dum Dums, released as their 3rd single in 2000. It was also included on their album It Goes Without Saying.

== Track listing ==
CD1

(Released September 11, 2000)

1. "You Do Something to Me" - 3:47
2. "It Goes Without Saying" - 2:50
3. "Robot Boy" - 2:41

CD2

(Released September 11, 2000)

1. "You Do Something to Me" - 3:50
2. "I Can't Stand It" - 3:43
3. "Running Away" - 3:35
4. "You Do Something to Me (Video)"

== Chart performance ==
"You Do Something to Me" entered the UK Singles Chart the week of 11-09-2000 at #27.

Chart (2000)	Peak Position
UK Singles Chart	27
