= Never Mind the Buzzcocks =

British TV comedy panel game (1996–2015, 2021–)

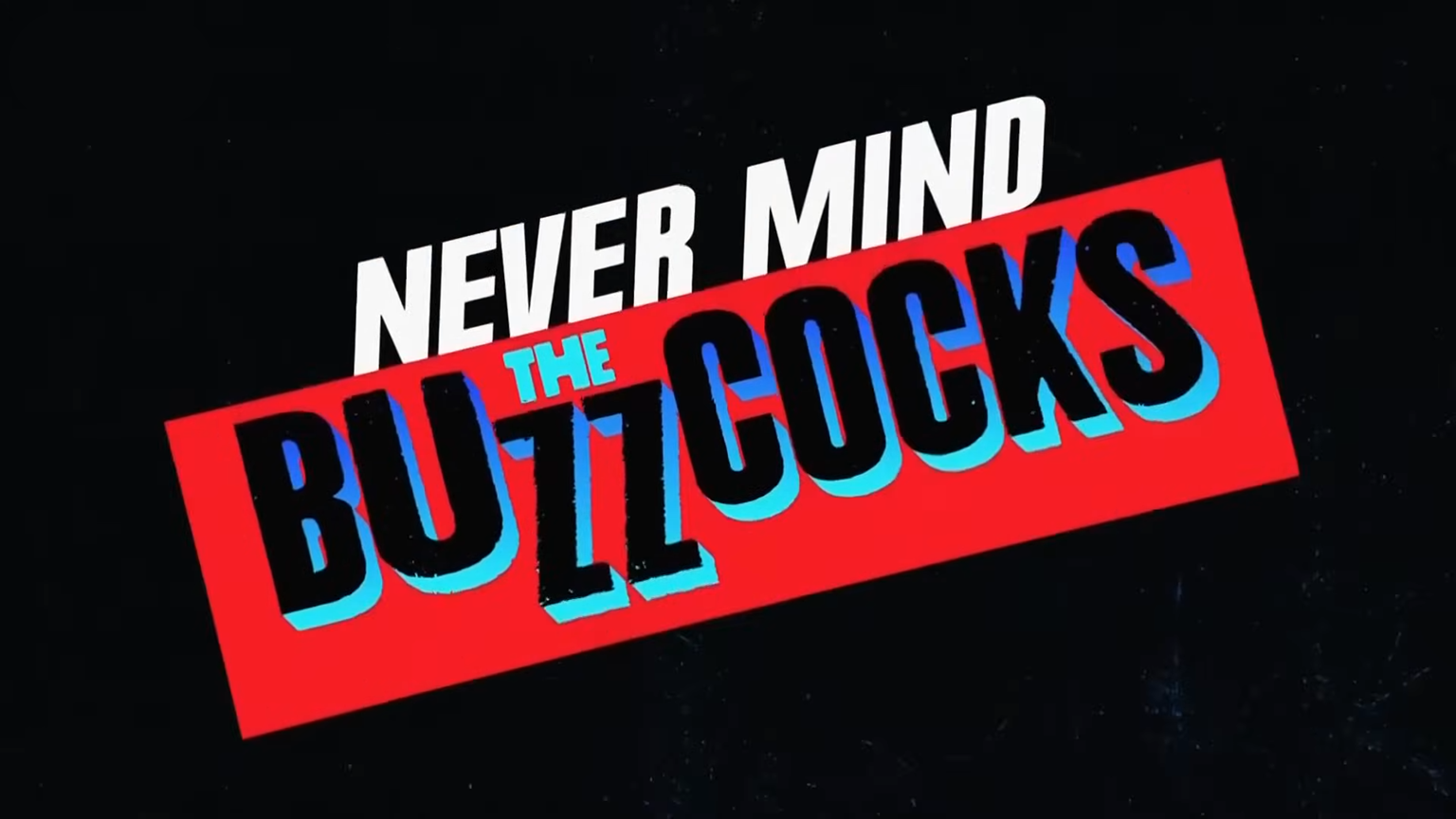
- Also known as: Buzzcocks
- Genre: Comedy panel game
- Created by: Bill Matthews; Simon Bullivant
- Presented by: Mark Lamarr; Simon Amstell; Rhod Gilbert; Greg Davies
- Starring: Phill Jupitus; Sean Hughes; Bill Bailey; Noel Fielding; Daisy May Cooper; Jamali Maddix; Sophie Willan
- Country of origin: United Kingdom
- Original language: English
- No. of series: 33
- No. of episodes: 327 (list of episodes)

Production
- Production locations: Television Centre, London (Note: Known as BBC Television Centre until 2013.) (1996–2012, 2022–); Riverside Studios (2013); Elstree Studios (2014–2015); BBC Elstree Centre (2021)
- Running time: 30 minutes (1996–2015); 45 minutes (2021–2023); 45-60 minutes (2024–)
- Production companies: Talkback (1996–2005, 2012–2015, 2021–2024); Talkback Thames (2006–2012, 2025–)

Original release
- Network: BBC Two (Series 1–28)
- Release: 12 November 1996 – 15 January 2015
- Network: Sky Max (Series 29–33); Sky One (Series 34)
- Release: 21 September 2021 – present

Never Mind the Buzzcocks is a British comedy panel game show with a pop music theme. The series originally aired between 12 November 1996 and 15 January 2015 on BBC Two. It was later revived and aired on Sky Max from 21 September 2021 to 18 December 2025 and following the channel's closure, it moved to Sky One. The series was first hosted by Mark Lamarr, then by Simon Amstell, and later by a number of guest presenters, with Rhod Gilbert hosting the 28th series, and Greg Davies hosting since series 29. It first starred Phill Jupitus and Sean Hughes as team captains, with Hughes being replaced by Bill Bailey from the eleventh series, and Bailey replaced by Noel Fielding for some of series 21 and from series 23 onward. From series 29–31, Fielding and Daisy May Cooper were the team captains, with Cooper replaced by Sophie Willan in some of series 32. The show is produced by Talkback. The title plays on the names of the Sex Pistols album Never Mind the Bollocks, Here's the Sex Pistols and the band Buzzcocks.

The show was known for its dry, sarcastic humour and scathing, provocative attacks on people and objects. It had some controversial guests throughout its initial 28-series run.

== History ==
The show ran on the BBC from 1996 until 2015. From its inception until December 2005, it was presented by Mark Lamarr (who also produced the show from 2004 until his departure). Simon Amstell started hosting in October 2006. Regular team captains include Phill Jupitus, Sean Hughes (until May 2002), Bill Bailey (September 2002 – February 2008), Noel Fielding (October 2009 – December 2014), and also the guest captains (October 2008 – January 2009). Bill Bailey had appeared as a guest in series 4 on Phill Jupitus' team and series 5 on Sean Hughes's team.

At the end of 2005, it was announced that Mark Lamarr was to take a break from the show after 150 episodes, to concentrate on other projects. The series that aired in early 2006 was hosted by guest presenters, before being permanently handed over to Simon Amstell, who had appeared twice as a panellist (series 13, episode 8 and series 16, episode 11), and once as a guest presenter (series 18, episode 2). The first time Amstell appeared as a panellist under Lamarr's tenure, coincidentally, Lamarr jokingly accused him of "stealing his act".

Following series 20 (Amstell's second as regular host), a highlights show was broadcast, presented by Alan Yentob as a parody of his own arts series Imagine. The highlights programme was sub-titled Imagine… A Mildly Amusing Panel Show. From then on, every series included a compilation highlights show, usually including some mockumentary-style "behind the scenes" footage.

Series 20 of Never Mind the Buzzcocks concluded on 7 March 2007. The show began its 21st series on 15 November 2007 with Simon Amstell as host and Phill Jupitus and Bill Bailey as team captains, although Noel Fielding temporarily replaced Bill Bailey for three episodes of series 21. Series 21 concluded on 14 February 2008.

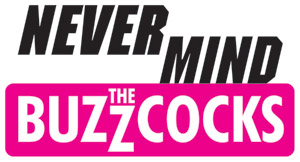
One of the logos used for the BBC run, from 1996 through 2015

On 18 September 2008, the BBC announced that Bill Bailey would be leaving the show, after eleven series, to concentrate on other commitments. While Simon Amstell and Phill Jupitus returned for the show's 22nd series, Bailey was replaced by a series of guest captains, including comedians Bob Mortimer, Jack Dee, Frank Skinner, Stephen Fry, James Corden, Mark Watson, Russell Brand, producer Mark Ronson and television presenters Dermot O'Leary and Davina McCall.

On 25 April 2009, Amstell announced via his internet mailing list that he would not be hosting another series of Never Mind the Buzzcocks because of his desire to concentrate on his live tours and performances instead. The new series began 1 October with Noel Fielding as a new permanent captain. Guest hosts included Alex James, Dermot O'Leary, Jack Whitehall, Rhod Gilbert, David Walliams, Claudia Winkleman, Frank Skinner, Frankie Boyle, James Corden, Mark Watson, Martin Freeman and David Tennant.

In 2010, guest hosts continued to present the show's 24th series, including Mark Ronson, Jack Dee, Josh Groban, Terry Wogan, Tim Minchin, Robert Webb, Tim Westwood, Catherine Tate, Frankie Boyle (hosting for the second time) and David O'Doherty, who also hosted a compilation show transmitted on 11 January 2011. On 16 July 2011, the first ever live Never Mind the Buzzcocks special was hosted at Latitude. It lasted roughly two hours, was hosted by David O'Doherty, had the team captains Phill Jupitus and Noel Fielding, and featured guests Seann Walsh, Charlie Baker, Paloma Faith and Robert Milton (standing in for Seasick Steve, who was supposed to be there but never arrived).

On 9 July 2014, it was confirmed that Rhod Gilbert had been named the next permanent host, beginning with series 28 in autumn 2014.

Between 3 June and 22 July 2013, a special eight-part retrospective programme called What a Load of Buzzcocks was aired, with narration by Alex James. The show revisited key years and events through classic moments and clips from the show's 16-year history.

Phill Jupitus was the only performer to have appeared in almost every original-run episode of Never Mind the Buzzcocks, missing only the recording of series 25, episode 6, where Frankie Boyle filled in as team captain, and a special episode filmed as part of Comic Relief's 24 Hour Panel People.

Never Mind the Buzzcocks returned in 2021 on Sky Max, with Noel Fielding the only returning panelist; Greg Davies was the new host, Daisy May Cooper the first female team captain, and Jamali Maddix was a regular team member in every episode.

=== Rounds ===
The show usually consists of four rounds. The first round changed multiple times over the course of the show. In early series it was often Freeze Frame (where a music video was paused at a key point and teams had to guess what happened next) or I Fought The Law (where teams had to guess which of a given list of crimes or lawsuits a pop star had been involved in, and whether they'd won or lost their case). Later, it usually consisted of the teams being asked a question concerning a unique fact about a musical artist or artists, such as "Why did Girls Aloud once have to cancel a show?" or "What have we pixelated in this still from a music video?" Sometimes the teams are given options to pick from; at other times they have no help. Alternatively, the first round was 'Connections' in which the teams are asked to identify the connection between two bands or artists. Series 25 introduced sets of props for the guests to identify as being part of the answer.

The second round is the Intros Round, wherein two members of a team (the captain and usually the musical guest) were asked to convey the introduction of a song a cappella (but using vocal sounds for instruments rather than words) for their teammate to guess. During the Christmas specials, the teams were often given instruments with which to play, though they are usually inappropriate or toy instruments.

The third round is usually the Identity Parade, though this was occasionally replaced by a few other alternative rounds. The audience was shown a video of a musician (often a member of an old band or a "one hit wonder" singer), and the teams have to pick the correct person from a line-up of five people. The audience and people at home are the only ones to see the video, making it harder for the contestants. The host will go through each member of the line-up, giving them humorous names based on either the name of the musician in question or their song. When the series returned in 2021, the Identity Parade instead sometimes included multiple members of a band or even the entire band.

The final round is called Next Lines, in which the host speaks a line of a song and the team has to name the next line of the song. Often the songs chosen are ones mentioned in earlier rounds and ones recorded by panel members. In the latter case, guests often prove incapable of reciting the lyrics to their own songs; for example, Romeo Stodart of The Magic Numbers failed entirely to recognise a line from a song which he joked was "like the B-side from our first single".

== Cast ==
Series (Years)	1–10 (1996–2002)	11–17 (2002–2005)	18 (2006)	19–21 (2006–2008)	22 (2008)	23–27 (2009–2013)	28 (2014)	29–31 (2021–2023)	32–34 (2024–2026)
Presenter	Mark Lamarr		Guests	Simon Amstell		Guests	Rhod Gilbert	Greg Davies	
Team captains	Phill Jupitus							Daisy May Cooper	Sophie Willan and Guests
Team captains	Sean Hughes	Bill Bailey			Guests	Noel Fielding			
Regular panellist								Jamali Maddix	

Until series 18, Never Mind the Buzzcocks was chaired by Mark Lamarr. Until series 10, the team captains were Phill Jupitus and Sean Hughes. After series 10, Hughes departed and was replaced by Bill Bailey. Lamarr left after series 17, and series 18 was chaired by a series of guest hosts. One of these, satirical comedian and former Popworld presenter Simon Amstell, took over as presenter from series 19 to series 22. Amstell sent an email to his fans on 24 April 2009, stating "I am Simon Amstell. Here is some news, should you be interested in this sort of thing. I will not be hosting another series of the fun pop quiz, ‘Never Mind the Buzzcocks’. When I first took on the role of hosting ‘Never Mind the Buzzcocks’, my only hope was to bring joy and laughter to the world and if I was lucky, put an end to war, disease and poverty. Now that I have achieved that, I plan to concentrate on my live work." Series 23 was chaired by a series of guest hosts which continued for series 24 because "none of the guest hosts were good enough" according to the comedic voice over on the first episode of series 24. In July 2014, it was announced that Rhod Gilbert would be the next permanent presenter for the 28th series.

Bill Bailey was unable to attend filming at the beginning of series 21, so Noel Fielding provided cover for three episodes starting 22 November 2007. Bill Bailey officially left the show after series 21 to pursue other commitments. His role as team captain was filled by several 'guest captains' for series 22 and permanently filled by Fielding from series 23 onward. Apart from one episode in series 25, and the 2011 Comic Relief special, Phill Jupitus appeared in every episode of the programme from its debut in 1996 until it was cancelled in 2015. Jupitus did not return for the revived series on Sky in 2021, making series 29 the first series in which he is not a regular team captain. In series 29, Greg Davies took over as host, Daisy May Cooper replaced Jupitus as team captain and Jamali Maddix joined as a regular panellist. In series 32, Daisy May Cooper does not appear on the show apart from the Christmas episode and is replaced regularly by Sophie Willan and guest captains including Mel B and Courtney Love. In series 33, there were mostly themed episodes featuring guest captains including Bez and Pepsi & Shirlie.

=== Walk-offs and non-airings ===
There have been some instances of guests walking off the show, or episodes being pulled from broadcast due to guest behaviour:

- In episode 2 of series 3, Lemmy of Motörhead walked off the show near the end of the episode, purportedly after he realised that Mark Lamarr and most of the other panellists' jokes were making fun of him (as well as former Bucks Fizz singer Jay Aston). Lemmy's walk-off was not shown on air however as by this time, main recording for the show had already finished and only retakes were being shot.
- In episode 3 of series 20, The Ordinary Boys' lead singer Preston walked off the show after Simon Amstell read extracts from the autobiography of Preston's then-wife, Chantelle Houghton. He was replaced by audience member Ed Seymour, picked out by Bill Bailey (on the grounds that he was of the closest physical resemblance that could be found), and credited as "special guest". Bailey's instructions to Seymour were "look surly and, every time [Amstell] mentions Chantelle, say 'that's out of order'". Coincidentally, Preston had been sitting in the same seat as Lemmy, leading it to be called the "ejector seat" by Phill in the next episode. In an August 2009 interview, Preston admitted that he regretted walking off the show and said that he would return to the programme if asked, saying "I'm struggling to think why I would have acted so weird".
- Russell Brand recorded an appearance as guest captain for series 22, but due to the Andrew Sachs prank call scandal that surrounded him, and his suspension—and then resignation—from the BBC, the episode was not broadcast until 19 January 2011.
- In episode 7 of series 27, during the Next Lines round, Huey Morgan of Fun Lovin' Criminals (who had also been sitting in the "ejector seat" and had made frequent prior appearances on the show, including as a guest host in 2006), smashed a mug and walked off at the end of the show just as his team was announced as the winner. Morgan's behaviour was believed to be due to guest hosts Rizzle Kicks giving his team Fun Lovin' Criminals lyrics (even though musicians on the show had frequently been given lyrics to their own songs in the round). Both Rizzle Kicks and Noel Fielding made fun of the incident shortly afterwards.
- One episode of series 30 (scheduled for 26 October 2022) was not shown after guest Lady Leshurr was charged with actual bodily harm after a 22 October 2022 incident; the postponed episode was burnt off at 2:15 a.m. and was never made available for streaming or download.

== International versions ==
- In 1998–1999 the Dutch-language Belgian TV channel Canvas aired one series of the pop quiz Nonkel Pop that was based on Never Mind the Buzzcocks, featuring an intros round, next lines, and similar panels of contestants. The show was hosted by Bart Peeters. The name of the show, which translates as 'Uncle Pop' was a play on Nonkel Bob (Uncle Bob—real name Bob Davidse), a legendary children's TV presenter from the early days of Belgian television. Bart Peeters made his television debut as a child on one of Nonkel Bob's shows.
- In 2002, an American version of the show on VH1 with the same title, hosted by comedian Marc Maron, lasted for a month. VH1 has since played airings of the classic episodes with Mark Lamarr.
- An official Dutch version, Doe Maar Normaal (which translates to "Just act normally", part of the Dutch proverb "Just act normally, that'll be silly enough", and is also a combination of famous Dutch bands Doe Maar and Normaal), ran for five seasons from 2007 to 2012. It was broadcast by BNN. Regular panel members included TV presenter Dennis Weening and comedian Ruben van der Meer and it was hosted by Ruben Nicolai.
- Despite persistent efforts by Foxtel, particularly by Darren Chau during his tenure as the Comedy Channel Group Programming Director, the programme could not be cleared for broadcast in Australia. Finally by 2012, the programme was cleared and launched in Australia on the Foxtel platform 16 July. It started to broadcast on ABC2 on 3 October 2013.

== Merchandise ==
=== Books ===
In 1999, BBC Worldwide published Never Mind the Buzzcocks: The Book, the CD, the Brief Intense Rush (followed by a feeling of paranoia and insecurity). The book includes famous moments from the first five series of the show, from selected Identity Parades, I Fought the Law, Word Up and Connections rounds, along with collections of Mark Lamarr's one-liners from the show. The book also features new material, including comic strips (one explaining the origin of The Human League frontman Philip Oakey's hairstyle) and "Great Moments in Rock History", in which photos of famous musical moments are altered to imply that line-up regular Athelston Williams was present. The CD features several Intros rounds from the show, in the format of a game to play at home.

=== Board game ===
In 2000, Paul Lamond Games released the Never Mind the Buzzcocks board game, licensed from the BBC and Talkback. The board game is played as follows: the players arrange themselves into two teams. They have two counters each on the board—one as a point marker along the edge of the board and the other to select the round they have to play on the roll of a die. There are six rounds that can be played:

- In the Style of..., where the team leader has to sing a song in the style of someone notable, e. g. "Twinkle Twinkle Little Star" in the style of Mick Jagger, or "Start Me Up" in the style of Jeremy Clarkson.
- When I Was Famous, where the team leader asks a trivia question, and the other team members have to guess the answer.
- Intros round, the only surviving round from the TV show. Each team gets two intro per round.
- Vital Vinyl, where the team leader asks a trivia question about a song or an album, and anyone from either team can answer.
- Songs in One Sentence, where the team leader divides their team into two, and one section of the team has to describe a song without mentioning the song title or any lyrics in the song, and the other section has to guess what the song is. This game was played once in the first series of the TV show.
- Your Number's Up, where the team leader reads the category on the card to the opposite team, for example, name four songs that mention American states in their titles, for which you might answer "New York Mining Disaster, 1941" (Bee Gees), "Hotel California" (Eagles), "Ohio" (Crosby, Stills, Nash, and Young), and "Sweet Home Alabama" (Lynyrd Skynyrd).

The teams earn the number of points given for the round on the card. For "In the Style of…", it is always one point for the song, and two points for the artist they are doing the song in the style of. At the end of their turn, the team moves their counter on the outer ring clockwise, by the number of points they scored.

The team that overtakes the other on the squares on the edge of the board wins the game.

In 2015 Paul Lamond Games released an updated version of the board game.

=== Video and DVD ===
In 1998, a video titled Never Rewind the Buzzcocks was released, containing an episode of the show that was specially-recorded for the video.

A best of DVD including some of the unbroadcastable scenes from the Simon Amstell series was released on 16 November 2009. The DVD contains 3 specials including:

- Never Mind the Buzzcocks: Imagine... a mildly amusing panel show (a parody of the BBC's Imagine series, with Alan Yentob acting as host)
- Never Mind the Buzzcocks – A Moving Tribute
- Never Mind the Buzzcocks – Technically, the Best Series Ever

The DVD also includes best of clips, and scenes that were not broadcast, with a compulsory commentary by Simon Amstell and Phill Jupitus.

== Transmissions ==
- ◀ – Phill/Daisy series win
- ▷ – Sean/Bill/guests/Noel series win
- — – Series drawn

=== Series ===
Series	Start date	End date	Episodes	
1	12 November 1996	7 February 1997	9	◀
2	15 September 1997	3 December 1997	8	▷
3	27 February 1998	10 April 1998	7	◀
4	11 September 1998	16 October 1998	7	◀
5	12 February 1999	9 April 1999	8	◀
6	10 September 1999	18 February 2000	9	◀
7	15 September 2000	10 November 2000	9	◀
8	26 February 2001	30 April 2001	10	◀
9	10 September 2001	5 November 2001	9	▷
10	7 January 2002	4 March 2002	9	—
11	23 September 2002	11 November 2002	8	◀
12	13 January 2003	17 March 2003	10	▷
13	8 September 2003	27 October 2003	8	▷
14	5 January 2004	15 March 2004	11	▷
15	20 September 2004	25 October 2004	6	—
16	2 January 2005	20 March 2005	11	◀
17	31 October 2005	12 December 2005	7	▷
18	13 March 2006	24 April 2006	7	▷
19	26 October 2006	30 November 2006	6	▷
20	31 January 2007	7 March 2007	6	—
21	15 November 2007	7 February 2008	11	▷
22	2 October 2008	11 December 2008	12	▷
23	1 October 2009	9 December 2009	11	▷
24	21 October 2010	3 January 2011	12	▷
25	3 October 2011	12 December 2011	11	—
26	24 September 2012	10 December 2012	11	—
27	23 September 2013	9 December 2013	11	—
28	29 September 2014	15 December 2014	11	▷
29	21 September 2021	2 November 2021	7	◀
30	14 September 2022	29 December 2022	9	▷
31	23 August 2023	19 December 2023	9	◀
32	16 October 2024	18 December 2024	10	▷
33	7 October 2025	18 December 2025	8	▷

=== Specials ===
Date	Entitle
21 February 1997	The Best of Series 1
30 December 1998	Christmas Special
29 December 1999	Christmas Special
28 December 2000	Christmas Special
30 December 2001	Christmas Special
20 May 2002	Eurovision Special
29 December 2002	Christmas Special
6 January 2003	100th Episode Special
28 December 2003	Christmas Special
20 December 2004	Christmas Special
20 December 2005	Christmas Special
31 December 2005	150th Episode Special
24 December 2006	Christmas Special
20 December 2007	Christmas Special
14 February 2008	The Best of Series 21
16 January 2009	The Best of Series 22
16 December 2009	Doctor Who Special
23 December 2009	The Best of Series 23
5 January 2011	The Best of Series 24
18 November 2011	Children in Need 2011 Special
19 December 2011	Christmas Special
29 December 2011	The Best of Series 25
23 March 2012	Sport Relief 2012 Special
17 December 2012	The Best of Series 26
22 December 2012	Christmas Special
9 December 2013	The Best of Series 27
16 December 2013	Christmas Special
22 December 2014	Christmas Special
15 January 2015	The Best of Series 28
15 December 2021	Christmas Special
15 December 2022	Christmas Special
19 December 2023	Christmas Special
18 December 2024	Christmas Special
18 December 2025	Christmas Special
