= Mark Lamarr =

British comedian, DJ and TV presenter (born 1967)

- Born: Mark Jones; 7 January 1967 (age 59); Swindon, Wiltshire, England
- Occupations: Comedian; disc jockey; television presenter
- Years active: 1985–2010

Mark Lamarr (born Mark Jones; 7 January 1967) is an English comedian, radio disc jockey and television presenter. He was a team captain on Shooting Stars from 1995 to 1997, and hosted Never Mind the Buzzcocks from 1996 to 2005.

== Career ==
=== Television ===
Lamarr first came to mass public attention as a co-presenter of the early-1990s late-night TV variety show The Word. The magazine format of the series allowed for interviews, live music, features and even game shows. Talking about his TV career to Jo Brown of Cheers Magazine, Lamarr said The Word was:

No fun at all; it was a horrible, horrible, repulsive environment to work in, mainly due to the company. They were just very... just an obnoxious group of people to deal with and I think that came across in the shows they ended up producing.

After leaving The Word, Lamarr was an outside presenter on The Big Breakfast from 1992 to 1996. Between 1995 and 1997 he appeared as a team captain in the surreal panel show Shooting Stars, where he displayed a mixture of dour boredom and contempt towards hosts Vic Reeves and Bob Mortimer who, in turn, mocked his "50s throw-back" appearance. Lamarr declined to return for the fourth series in 2002. Interviewed in 2003, he said of his experience on the show:

Shooting Stars was strangely no fun whatsoever, because I was sort of playing a particularly moody, almost mute character and you end up just doing that... I mean it was always fun with Vic and Bob because they are old friends and it was nice working with them, but no, it wasn't fun.

Lamarr was host of Never Mind the Buzzcocks when the show launched in 1996 and continued in this role for 17 series until 2005. Under Lamarr, the show gained a reputation for scornful treatment of the boy bands and the pop music that had dominated the music scene since the early 1990s, a position that was maintained by his successor. Lamarr left the show in 2005 and initially claimed he intended to return after one series away. However, Lamarr later confirmed via Twitter in 2022 that he said that to avoid questions about leaving the show. He was ultimately replaced by Simon Amstell from the 19th series.

The 2004 second series of the sitcom 15 Storeys High was co-written by Lamarr with comedians Sean Lock and Martin Trenaman, although Lamarr was credited under his original name, Mark Jones. Lamarr made a cameo appearance in the fourth episode of series two.

=== Radio ===
Lamarr has previously presented shows on BBC GLR, BBC Radio 5 and BBC Radio 1. He also often guest presented the late night BBC Radio 2 show, sitting in for Mark Radcliffe.

On 20 July 1998, Lamarr launched a new show on BBC Radio 2 called Shake, Rattle and Roll, where he played tracks from his own record collection of obscure rock and roll. He also presented The Reggae Show series and Mark Lamarr's Alternative Sixties, playing lesser known tracks from the 1960s.

On 22 April 2006, Lamarr started a new Radio 2 show called God's Jukebox. The show aired from midnight to 3.00am on Saturdays and featured a wide variety of music from the previous 70 years including soul, ska, reggae, country, gospel and rap. He also, with Jo Brand, regularly covered the Jonathan Ross Saturday morning show on Radio 2 when Ross was away. His final God's Jukebox show was broadcast on Christmas Eve/Day, 2010. At the end of 2010 Lamarr left Radio 2, claiming the station had lost interest in non-mainstream music.

Lamarr presented a music show for British Airways on-board listeners as part of their in-flight entertainment. In this show he presented a mix of rock and roll, blues, reggae, soul and R&B.

=== Post-radio career ===
Lamarr has continued to produce compilation albums for several record labels, with an emphasis on lesser-known rock 'n' roll tracks. He produced a compilation for Vee-Tone Records in 2015. Lamarr joined Twitter in 2018 and uses the platform to showcase lesser-known music.

Lamarr made a return to comedy in September 2020, appearing in an episode of the BBC Radio 4 sitcom Phil Ellis Is Trying as the voice of Billy Bonker, the reclusive owner of a Cup-a-Soup factory.

In 2023 Lamarr confirmed on social media that he had retired, and did so at 43. As of 2026, he has been acting as a record dealer.

=== Stand-up videos ===
- Uncensored And Live (17 November 1997)

== Personal life ==
In 2018, Lamarr was charged with common assault and false imprisonment. However the Crown Prosecution Service later dropped the charges, saying that there was "insufficient evidence to provide a realistic prospect of prosecution".

In 2026, Lamarr was banned from driving for six months and fined £236 after driving at 46 mph in a 40 mph zone. As part of his court mitigation plea, he confirmed he suffers from chronic fatigue syndrome.
