= It Goes Without Saying =

Studio album by Dum Dums
- Released: 11 September 2000
- Recorded: 1999–2000
- Length: 46:08
- Label: Good Behaviour

It Goes Without Saying is the only studio album by the British band the Dum Dums, released in the United Kingdom on 18 September 2000.

== Track listing ==
Professional ratings
Review scores
Source	Rating
Allmusic	3/5 stars
Select	1/5 medals
Melody Maker	4/5 medals
Front	4/5 medals
Smash Hits	10/10 medals

1. "The Kind Of Day I've Had"
2. "Everything"
3. "Caught Me in a Trap"
4. "Until My Ship Comes In"
5. "Can't Get You Out of My Thoughts"
6. "You Knock Me Off My Feet"
7. "Killing Me with Kindess"
8. "Lonely Hearts Company"
9. "You Do Something to Me"
10. "Hole in Your Heart"
11. "Army of Two"
  - Contains the hidden track "Setting Sail".
