= Dumdums (band) =

British pop-rock band

Dum Dums
- Origin: London, England
- Genres: Rock, alternative rock, pop punk, power pop, indie
- Years active: 1997–2001
- Labels: Wildstar Records, Good Behaviour Records
- Past members: Josh Doyle; Steve Clarke; Stuart 'Baxter' Wilkinson

The Dumdums (formerly stylised as Dum Dums) were a British guitar-pop band. London-based, they split up in August 2001. The band members were Josh Doyle – vocals and guitar, Steve Clarke – bass and vocals, Stuart 'Baxter' Wilkinson – drums and vocals.

In their short but successful career their achievements included reaching the Top 40 in the UK Singles Chart with four singles ("Everything", "Can't Get You Out of My Thoughts", "You Do Something To Me" and "Army of Two") and playing at Wembley Stadium with Bon Jovi and at Hyde Park, London with Elton John, Christina Aguilera and Destiny's Child. After selling out a final UK tour, they decided to part ways at the peak of their popularity under a shroud of mystery.

Their principal songwriter/lead vocalist Josh Doyle is now resident in Nashville, Tennessee. After years in the musical wilderness he emerged in 2012 to make his network TV debut on Jimmy Kimmel Live!, with his new band and a single "Solarstorms". Billboard magazine wrote in their 7 November 2012 issue "615 Spotlight" feature, that Doyle "may well be the Next Big Thing on an international level".

== Career ==
Originally formed in 1997, straight out of school, the band spent their early years gigging in small venues and songwriting. They signed a management contract with Modernwood Management, and then signed to Wildstar Records in March 1999. In the same month they went on their first UK tour, supporting fellow Modernwood artist, Nik Kershaw. A more extensive tour in September, supporting My Life Story, followed. It was on this tour that the band began to build up their fanbase, selling a two-track CD known as "The Blue CD" that contained the tracks "Everything" and "Until My Ship Comes In".

Dum Dums' debut single, "Everything", produced by Steve Power was released on 28 February 2000. Accompanied by a video and A-listing on British radio stations, including BBC Radio 1, it reached 21 in the UK Singles Chart.

The second single, "Can't Get You Out of My Thoughts" was released on 26 June 2000 and reached number 18 in the UK chart.

On 18 September 2000, their debut album, It Goes Without Saying, again produced by Power, was released in the UK. It received favourable reviews from the music press, with the band being compared to Green Day, The Police, Blink-182, Elvis Costello and The Jam. The album comprised eleven listed tracks and an unlisted bonus track, revealed as "Setting Sail" in the liner notes.

A third single, "You Do Something To Me" was released a week prior to the album, and this reached number 27. The music video for this song, inspired by Queen's "I Want to Break Free" promo, featured Doyle and Wilkinson in drag. The song was used as the theme tune to the CBBC show Xchange, and they performed the song on the last episode of the series.

They supported Bon Jovi at Wembley Stadium and also performed at Glastonbury, T in the Park, V2000 and several roadshows and outdoor gigs organised by local radio stations. In October they played 22 shows at arenas around the country supporting Robbie Williams. The year ended with another headline tour, with a final gig at London's Shepherd's Bush Empire on 19 December.

There was also TV exposure on shows such as The Big Breakfast, CD:UK, and The Pepsi Chart. Doyle also appeared as a panellist on the BBC Two quiz show, Never Mind The Buzzcocks.

The final single from their debut album, "Army of Two" was released on 5 February 2001. It reached number 27 in the UK Singles Chart; exactly matching the chart placings of both "You Do Something To Me" and It Goes Without Saying. There were three acoustic performances at Tower Records in London, Birmingham and Southampton to promote the release. UK gigs in 2001 mainly consisted of appearances at University Summer Balls. The band also travelled to Germany and Japan for tours with Wheatus and The PeteBest. They entered the Japanese Top 20 with "Everything".

The band went into the studio on three occasions in 2001, recording demo versions of the songs that would eventually comprise their second album. A session in February resulted in five new tracks being laid down, including "Photographs", which was played many times on tour in 2000. Another session in April saw ten tracks recorded, and a final session in June, just prior to their Japanese tour, yielded another four tracks.

By mutual agreement the band decided to break up, and announced via their website that their last concert would be at the Greenbelt Festival in August 2001. The set at the last gig included a new song that had been demoed, called "Travelling at Speed".

Doyle has had a re-emergence as a US-based singer-songwriter whilst Wilkinson and Clarke formed Rogue States. The band released b-sides under the title Dumdums in May 2018.

== Discography ==
=== Singles ===
- 2000 – "Everything"
- 2000 – "Can't Get You Out of My Thoughts"
- 2000 – "You Do Something to Me"
- 2001 – "Army of Two"

=== EPs ===
- 2001 – Army of Two EP (Japan only)

=== Albums ===
- 2000 – It Goes Without Saying
