= Josh Doyle =

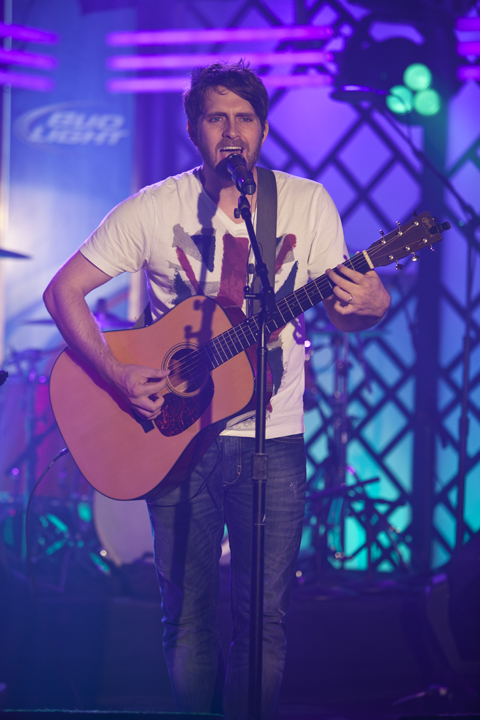

Background information
- Born: Josh Doyle
- Origin: Ashford, Kent, England
- Genres: Alternative rock
- Occupations: Singer-songwriter
- Instruments: Vocals, electric guitar, acoustic guitar
- Years active: 1997–present
- Label: GB Recordings CTK Records/Corporate Ogre Records
- Formerly of: Dum Dums; Church of Roswell
- Website: JoshDoyle.com

Josh Doyle is a British-American singer-songwriter and musician best known as a solo performer as well as being the frontman of UK punk pop group Dum Dums

In 2012 he signed with CTK management (Dolly Parton) and The Agency Group (Muse, My Chemical Romance, Pink Floyd) after being discovered through winning the "Guitar Center Singer Songwriter" contest. His single "Solarstorms" was released worldwide on CTK Records/Corporate Ogre Records on 23 August 2012, accompanied by his US Network TV debut on "Jimmy Kimmel Live!" His self-titled album was released on 23 October 2012, produced by multiple Grammy award-winning producer John Shanks.

In 2021 he teamed up with Candi Carpenter to form "Church Of Roswell" on their Americana-driven EP "Here Comes Church Of Roswell" produced by Alden Witt and Peter Shurkin, mixed by Ryan Hewitt and featuring the 400 unit. As of 2026, the project appears to be inactive.

== History ==
=== Dum Dums ===
Between 1998 and 2001, Doyle's band Dum Dums were among a handful of successful guitar bands amongst a glut of all singing, all dancing boy-bands and female pop starlets. While touring the "toilet" circuit (small clubs across the country such as "The Charlotte" in Leicester and "The Camden Monarch" in London) in the UK, they were signed to Wildstar by Ian McAndrew (Arctic Monkeys, Travis) and exploded across the radiowaves. Their first single 'Everything' hit the Official UK Top 20 and led to four UK hit singles from the first hit album, "It Goes Without Saying".

Doyle became a recognisable face in the UK music scene. The band grew in stature, selling out venues all over the UK including Shepherds Bush Empire in London. They were cover stars of national music magazines including Melody Maker, and due to their live reputation made new fans of Paul Cook of the Sex Pistols and John Entwistle of The Who. They were invited by Paul Weller (The Jam) to play Earls Court and by Robbie Williams to support him on 30 arena dates.

They played all the major festivals, sharing the stage with The Flaming Lips in Glastonbury, Supergrass at V2000 (the same day they supported Bon Jovi at Wembley Stadium) and a star-studded line-up at Party in the Park for 250,000 at Hyde Park. They toured as headliners in Germany and Japan, hitting the Japanese charts with single "Everything", in 2001 signing to MCA in the US.

While recording the follow-up album, after the big US deal, the band span off into personal breakdown. Given a "write more 'pop' or get 'dropped' " ultimatum by the UK label, Doyle decided they had already strayed too much into 'pop' territory and quit the band. He watched as poppier, manufactured copies of his band sprung up such as Busted and McFly and dominated the music charts for the next couple of years, while he could not put his finger on a direction to pursue next. Depression descended and Doyle became reclusive, not leaving the house for days at a time.

=== Solo and wilderness period ===
In 2003, he and his wife sold and gave away all their personal belongings and moved from the UK to Nashville, Tennessee.

The next year saw him recording The End of Fear EP with college student Sam Shacklock, one half of Intramural (the other half being Statistics frontman and Conor Oberst bandmate Denver Dalley). Doyle released the EP independently from his website, mailing each CD out by hand. An underground US following developed quickly, and respected zines such as Absolute Punk "a stellar debut, 8/10" and Sound The Sirens "a therapeutic must-have" gave high ratings. Using only MySpace and physical CD mail order sales (no touring, no digital sales, no radio) Doyle slowly but surely sold out of the first run of the EP, with help from a remnant of Dum Dums fans and a growing contingent newly discovered fans from the US.

In 2005 he played rough acoustic demos of new material to rock producer Joe Baldridge (Beck, Family Force 5, Jewel), who began producing his album, "The Long Distance Runner", without a record deal or management. At the same time, he also played his first solo shows in four years in Tennessee supporting Imogen Heap. His new songs impressed sufficiently to obtain international management from Showdown in the US (Creed, Mutemath, Paramore, Family Force 5) and Radius in the UK (Imogen Heap, Dum Dums).

In 2009, Doyle parted ways with Joe Baldridge and Showdown Management frustrated by the lack of time they had for his project. The tapes for "The Long Distance Runner" were unfinished and tied up in contractual red tape though Doyle aimed to revisit them as evidenced in his liner notes on the Values and Virtues EP. Values and Virtues was released independently, funded by his fanbase. With the proceeds of those sales Doyle was able to tour the UK without a label or any sponsorship, testing a new way forward for artists who have fans but choose not to sign with a record label. Interview about his crowd funding project in Music Magazine

In 2010, Doyle had his songs featured on ABC TV show The Unusuals and in promos for the ION Network over all the US cable networks. He used the licensing fees to fund a home studio and began his "Songs From The Nuclear War" project in 2011, which itself led to a small scale Midwest US tour.

=== Winning G.C. Singer Songwriter 2012 and recording debut full-length album ===
In March 2012, Doyle beat 17,000 other entrants to win the Grand Prize in the Nationwide 2012 Guitar Center Singer Songwriter Contest.

Doyle recorded his debut album in April 2012 with producer John Shanks (Bon Jovi, Alanis Morissette, Keith Urban) in Henson Studios, Studio D. The prize had stated that John record a 3-song EP, but impressed by Doyle's body of work, Shanks decided to record an entire album instead "Every song was great. It became clear to me that Josh Doyle was a very impressive artist...he needed a statement that was as strong as it could be for the new journey he would be embarking on".

Multiple Grammy-winner Shanks enlisted a legendary line-up, including drummer Matt Chamberlain, guitarist Dean Parks, keyboardist Patrick Warren and bassist Leland Sklar to serve as Doyle's studio band, and the entire album took only about six days to complete tracking. Many of the ten tracks were recorded over six or seven takes, some only one or two. Leland Sklar (Jackson Browne, James Taylor, Warren Zevon) explained the process; "There was just a magic that used to go on, and it still happens on occasion, like I was saying with this Josh Doyle... He came in the studio, and all it is is him playing acoustic guitar – done. No charts, no arrangements or anything. It was so on fire and so great that we cut 10 tracks and did his album. This guy just kept pulling songs – he was writing. Then when the guy sits down to play and we'd say, "Well, it's just a run through," every time he opens his mouth, it's a performance."

Doyle appeared on ABC's Jimmy Kimmel Live! on 23 August 2012 where he performed his debut single "Solarstorms" on air, with a special online-exclusive performance of 'I Figured the World Out'. His debut self-titled album was released on 23 October 2012.

Billboard magazine wrote in their 7 November 2012 "615 Spotlight" feature Josh Doyle "may well be the Next Big Thing on an international level"

Nashville Lifestyles Magazine wrote in their December 2012 "20 Musicians To Watch in 2013" that Doyle "is the talk of the town right now... you have to see him for yourself"

In 2013 Doyle performed few, high-profile concert performances including the Avalon Stage at Glastonbury Festival 2013 and the Hard Rock Rising stage at Hard Rock Calling 2013 in the UK.

== Solo discography ==
- 2002 – The Barnroom Sessions
- 2004 – The End of Fear EP
- 2009 – Values and Virtues EP
- 2012 – Josh Doyle LP
- 2017 – Live Recordings LP
- 2017 – Modern Times EP
- 2018 – All You Zombies EP
