= Edinburgh Comedy Festival =

Short-lived festival of August 2008 and 2009

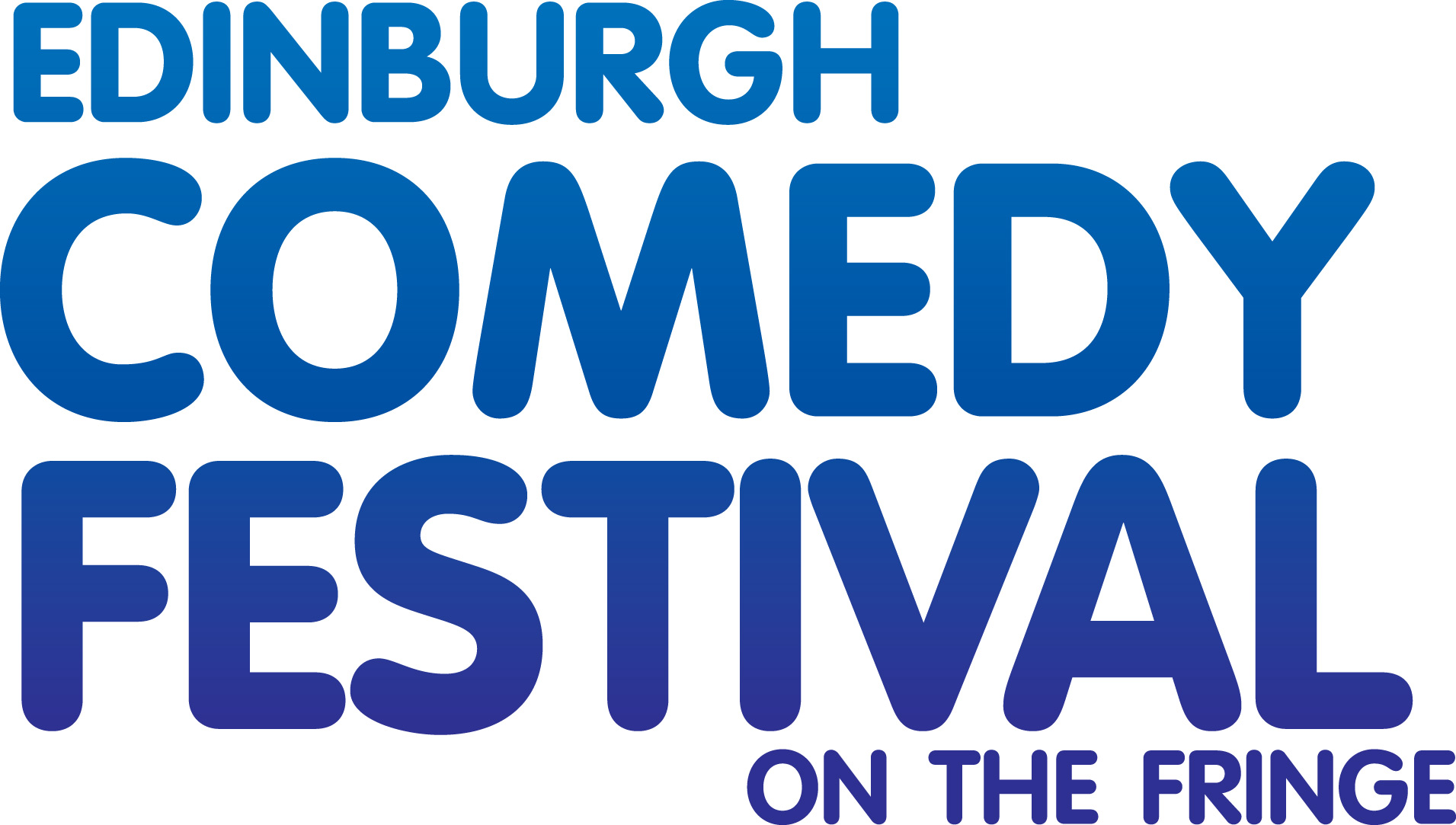
The 2008 Edinburgh Comedy Festival logo

Edinburgh Comedy Festival was a short-lived festival of comedy shows which operated during the Edinburgh Festival Fringe in August 2008 and 2009. Effectively a marketing campaign for the "Big Four" venues at the Fringe - Assembly, Gilded Balloon, Pleasance and Underbelly - the designation was quietly dropped after widespread media and industry criticism.

== History ==
In the 1990s, an attempt was made to create an Edinburgh Comedy Festival in August, with a cigarette brand as the sponsor.

The idea was revived, however, when, in June 2008, many news stories and commentaries appeared in the media about the launch of the Edinburgh Comedy Festival, both positive and negative.

Much was reported of the lack of sponsorship in the festival's first year, following reports that collectively, the four venues involved in the festival had made a £76,000 loss in 2007. At a press conference on Thursday 5 June explanations were made of the intention to plough sponsorship money back into the festival, with the long-term goal of making the festival cheaper for acts.

One prominent critic of the move was Tommy Sheppard, owner of Edinburgh comedy venue, The Stand Comedy Club, which itself hosts many comedy shows as part of the Fringe. Sheppard was invited to form part of the festival but refused in spring 2008. Sheppard was, and is, director of the Glasgow International Comedy Festival.

The Edinburgh Comedy Festival 2008 ran from 30 July–25 August, alongside the 2008 Fringe. Only performances at Assembly, Gilded Balloon, Pleasance and Underbelly came under its auspices. The four venues produced a joint brochure consisting of two sides - one presented as the Edinburgh Comedy Festival brochure, with shows of all other genres at those venues listed on the other side.

The shows in the Comedy Festival programme represented almost 90% of the comedy at the 2008 Fringe. High-profile names in the 2008 festival include Joan Rivers, Paul Merton, Clive James and John Pinette.

The Edinburgh Comedy Festival ran again in 2009, from 5–31 August.

The term "Edinburgh Comedy Festival" has since ceased to be used, although the Big Four venues continue to produce a combined brochure.
