= Edinburgh Festival Fringe =

Scottish annual arts festival

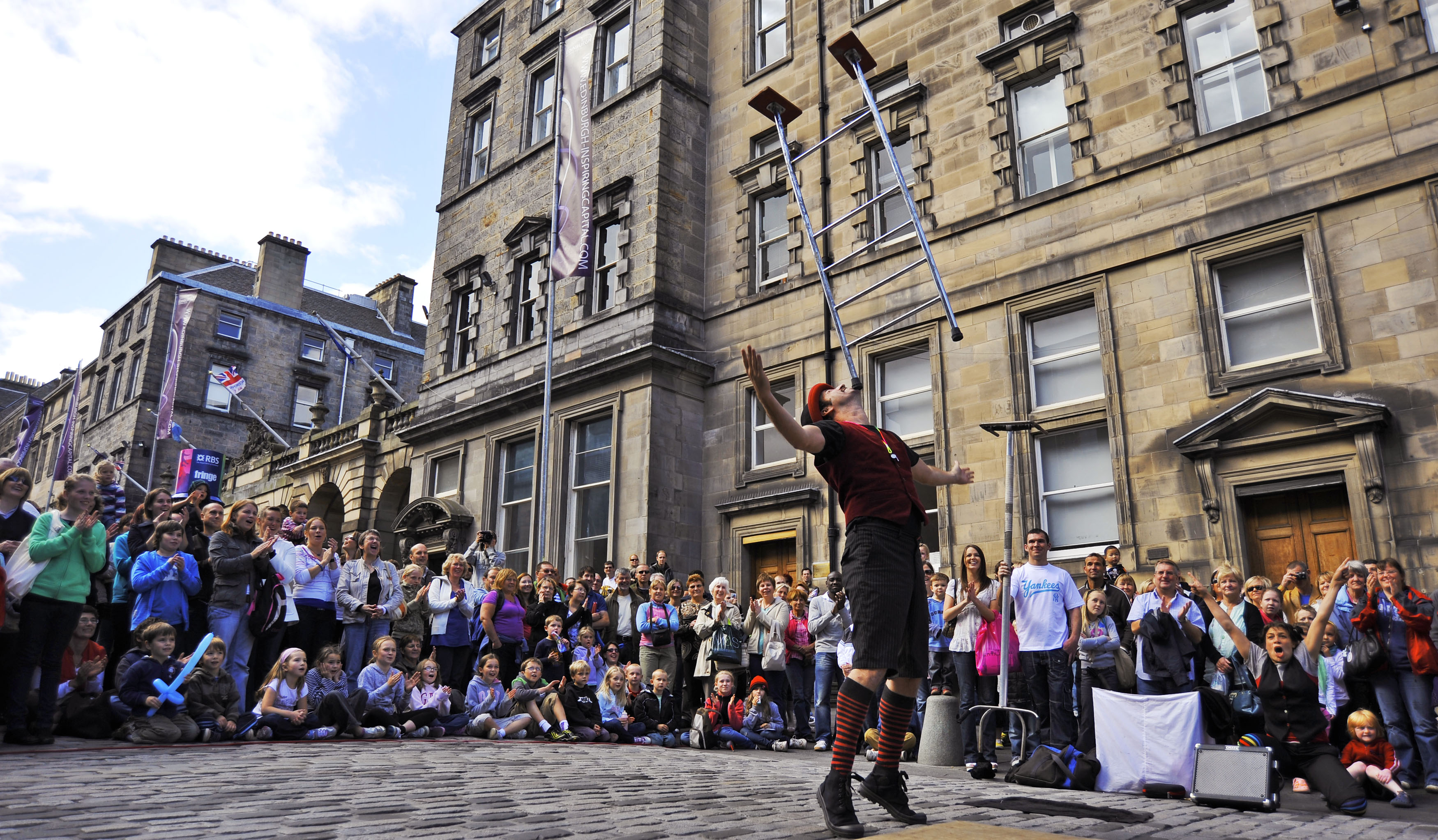
- A street performer on the High Street in 2010
- Genre: Arts festival
- Dates: 2026: 7–31 August (exact dates vary each year)
- Locations: Edinburgh, Scotland
- Years active: 1947–present
- Founded: 1947; 79 years ago
- Website: edfringe.com

The Edinburgh Festival Fringe, often referred to as the Edinburgh Fringe or simply the Fringe, is the world's largest performing arts festival. In 2025, it ran for 25 days, selling more than 2.6 million tickets, and featured 53,942 performances of 3,893 shows across 301 venues, with participants from 68 countries.

Established in 1947 as an unofficial offshoot on the "fringe" of the Edinburgh International Festival, it takes place in Edinburgh every August and is the origin of the term "fringe theatre." The combination of Edinburgh Festival Fringe and Edinburgh International Festival has become a world-leading celebration of arts and culture, surpassed only by the Olympics and the World Cup in terms of global ticketed events.

It is an open-access (or "unjuried") performing arts festival, meaning that there is no selection committee, and anyone may participate, with any type of performance. The official Fringe programme categorises shows into sections for theatre, comedy, dance, physical theatre, circus, cabaret, children's shows, musicals, opera, music, spoken word, exhibitions, and events. Comedy is the largest section, making up more than one-third of the programme, and the one that in modern times has the highest public profile, due in part to the Edinburgh Comedy Awards.

The Festival is supported by the Edinburgh Festival Fringe Society, which publishes the programme, sells tickets to all events from a central physical box office and website, and offers year-round advice and support to performers. The Society operates the Fringe Shop on the Royal Mile, which is also home to the Fringe Box Office in the run-up to and during the festival. As of 2026, the Fringe Society's headquarters have been based at 6 Infirmary Street, and named Fringe Central.

The Fringe board of directors is drawn from members of the Edinburgh Festival Fringe Society, many of whom are Fringe participants themselves – performers or venue operators. Elections are held once a year, in August, and board members serve a term of four years. The Board appoints the Fringe Society's Chief Executive (formerly known as the Fringe Administrator or Director). The Chief Executive operates under the chair.

Phoebe Waller-Bridge, whose show Fleabag was performed at the Fringe in 2013 before being adapted for television, was named the first-ever President of the Edinburgh Festival Fringe Society in 2021.

The planned 2020 Fringe was suspended along with all of the city's other major summer festivals. This came as a result of the COVID-19 outbreak in the early months of the year, with concerns of spreading the virus any further.

The 2021 Fringe took place during 6–30 August 2021, though it was much reduced in size, with 528 shows in person and 414 online. The 2022 festival took place from 5–29 August 2022 and marked a return to pre-pandemic levels, with 3,334 shows. Fifty were livestreamed, by NextUp Comedy, for the first time ever since the founding of the Fringe, in an effort to stay true to the Fringe Society's 2022 vision of equality and inclusiveness. The 2025 festival took place from August 1 to 25. The 2026 edition took place from August 7 to 31. In 2027, the Fringe's 80th year, the festival will take place from 6 to 30 August.

== History and origins ==
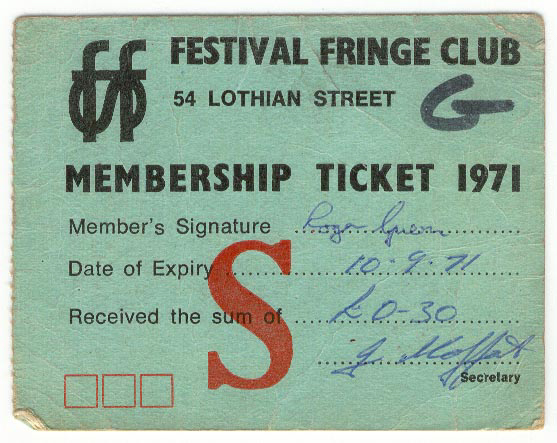
1971 Festival Fringe Club Membership Card

=== Early years ===
The Fringe started life when eight theatre companies turned up uninvited to the inaugural Edinburgh International Festival in 1947. With the International Festival using the city's major venues, these companies took over smaller, alternative venues for their productions. Seven performed in Edinburgh, and one undertook a version of the medieval morality play Everyman in Dunfermline Abbey, about 20 miles north, across the River Forth in Fife. These groups aimed to take advantage of the large assembled theatre crowds to showcase their own alternative theatre. Although at the time it was not recognised as such, this was the first Edinburgh Festival Fringe.

This meant that two defining features of the future Fringe were established at the very beginning – the lack of official invitations to perform and the use of unconventional venues. Originally, these groups referred to themselves as the "Festival Adjuncts" and were also referred to as the "semi-official" festival. It was not until the following year, 1948, that Robert Kemp, a Scottish playwright and journalist, is credited with coining the title "Fringe" when he wrote during the second Edinburgh International Festival:

Round the fringe of official Festival drama, there seems to be more private enterprise than before ... I am afraid some of us are not going to be at home during the evenings!

The word "fringe" had in fact been used in a review of Everyman in 1947, when a critic remarked it was a shame the show was so far out "on the fringe of the Festival". In 1950, it was still being referred to in similar terms, with a small 'f':

On the fringe of the official Festival there are many praiseworthy "extras," including presentations by the Scottish Community Drama Association and Edinburgh University Dramatic Society – Dundee Courier, 24 August 1950

Since it was not yet fully developed, much of the early years of the Fringe has gone unrecorded, except through anecdote. It did not benefit from any official organisation until 1951, when students of the University of Edinburgh set up a drop-in centre in the YMCA, where cheap food and a bed for the night were made available to participating groups.

Late-night revues, which would become a feature of Fringes, began to appear in the early 1950s. The first one was the New Drama Group's After The Show, a series of sketches taking place after Donald Pleasence's Ebb Tide, in 1952. Among the talent to appear in early Fringe revues were Ned Sherrin in 1955, and Ken Loach and Dudley Moore with the Oxford Theatre Group in 1958. Due to many reviewers only being able to attend Fringe events late night after the official festival was finished, the Fringe came to be seen as being about revues.

It was a few years before an official programme for the Fringe was created. John Menzies compiled a list of shows under the title "Other Events" in their omnibus festival brochure, but it was printer C. J. Cousland who was the first to publish a listings guide, in 1954. This was funded by participating companies and was entitled "Additional Entertainments", since the name "Fringe" was still not yet in regular usage.

By that year, the Fringe was attracting around a dozen companies, and a meeting was held to discuss creating "a small organisation to act as a brain for the Fringe", or what The Scotsman called an "official unofficial festival". A first attempt was made to provide a central booking service in 1955 by students from the university, although it lost money, which was blamed on those who had not taken part.

In 1956, the actor Donald Wolfit performed the solo show The Strong Are Lonely. This was not part of the International Festival, yet nor was it in the Fringe Programme, leading him to question the value of the "Fringe": "Away with the Fringe. To an artist in the theatre there is no such thing as a fringe of art."

Formal organisation progressed in 1959, with the formation of the Festival Fringe Society. The push for such an organisation was led by Michael Imison, director of Oxford Theatre Group. A constitution was drawn up, in which the policy of not vetting or censoring shows was set out, and the Society produced the first guide to Fringe shows. Nineteen companies participated in the Fringe in that year. By that time it provided a "complete... counter-festival programme" although efforts were still being made to gain publicity through the International Festival programme. The YMCA became established as the first central Fringe ticket office.

Not long afterwards came the first complaints that the Fringe had become too big. Director Gerard Slevin said in 1961 that "it would be much better if only ten halls were licensed".

=== 1960s and 1970s ===
In the 1960s and 1970s, the Fringe began to establish its reputation for size and variety and the tension between it and the more formal International Festival became of mutual benefit.

The artistic credentials of the Fringe were established by the creators of the Traverse Theatre, John Calder, Jim Haynes and Richard Demarco, in 1963. While their original objective was to maintain something of the Festival atmosphere in Edinburgh all year round, the Traverse Theatre quickly and regularly presented cutting-edge drama to an international audience at both the Edinburgh International Festival and the Fringe during August. It set a standard to which other companies on the Fringe aspired.

The Pleasance, a venue since the first year of the Fringe, was also important in setting the artistic tone. Christopher Richardson, founder of the Pleasance Theatre Trust, became a major Fringe figure.

John Cairney is credited with pioneering the one-man Fringe show with his show based on Robert Burns, There Was A Man, in 1965, although Elspeth Douglas Reid had done her One Woman Theatre as early as 1955. American Nancy Cole played Gertrude Stein in 1969 and continued to do so until 1985.

Over the first two decades of the Fringe, each performing group used its own performing space, or venue. However, by the late 1960s, the concept of sharing a venue became popular, principally as a means of cutting costs. It soon became common for halls to host up to six or seven different shows per day. The obvious next step was to partition a venue into two or more performing spaces; the majority of today's major venues fit into this category.

For many years, the Fringe Club (variously in the High Street from 1971 and at Teviot Row House from 1981) provided nightly showcases of Fringe fare to allow audiences to sample shows. In its earlier years the club also provided a significant space for after-hours socialising at a time when Edinburgh's strict licensing laws meant a 10pm pub closing time. For a time, the main ticket office was in the University Chaplaincy Centre, and then in the Royal Mile Centre on the High Street. Although the Fringe was now associated with the High Street, areas like the New Town, West End and Morningside were also prominent in this period.

Problems then began to arise as the Fringe became too big for students and volunteers to deal with. Eventually in 1969, the Fringe Society became a constituted body, and in 1970 it employed its first administrator, John Milligan. He started work in January 1971, originally on a part-time basis, but it became clear after a few weeks that the role would have to be permanent. Milligan was responsible for a number of innovations which remain in place today, such as the numbering system for venues and the Fringe map in the brochure, and he was also credited with establishing the co-operative spirit of the Fringe. He left in 1976.

Between 1976 and 1981, under the direction of Alistair Moffat, the number of companies performing rose from 182 to 494, and new venues such as St Columba's in Newington came on board. Moffat also expanded the street performance aspect and brought in sponsorship deals, particularly local breweries. In this way, the Fringe ascended to its current position as the largest arts festival in the world. This was a deliberate policy by Moffat, who found it difficult to promote the Fringe on merit given the Society's position of neutrality. Increasing show numbers was therefore a way of attracting more attention. At this point, the Fringe operated on only two full-time members of staff. In 1977, the office moved to a converted shop and basement at 170 High Street.

The International Festival, now under the direction of John Drummond, became more accommodating towards the Fringe in the late 1970s and some successful Fringe performers transferred to perform works at the Festival. These included Richard Crane and Faynia Williams, who in 1981 produced a sell-out version of The Brothers Karamazov for the Festival, after having been successful in the Fringe during the '70s.

=== 1980s ===
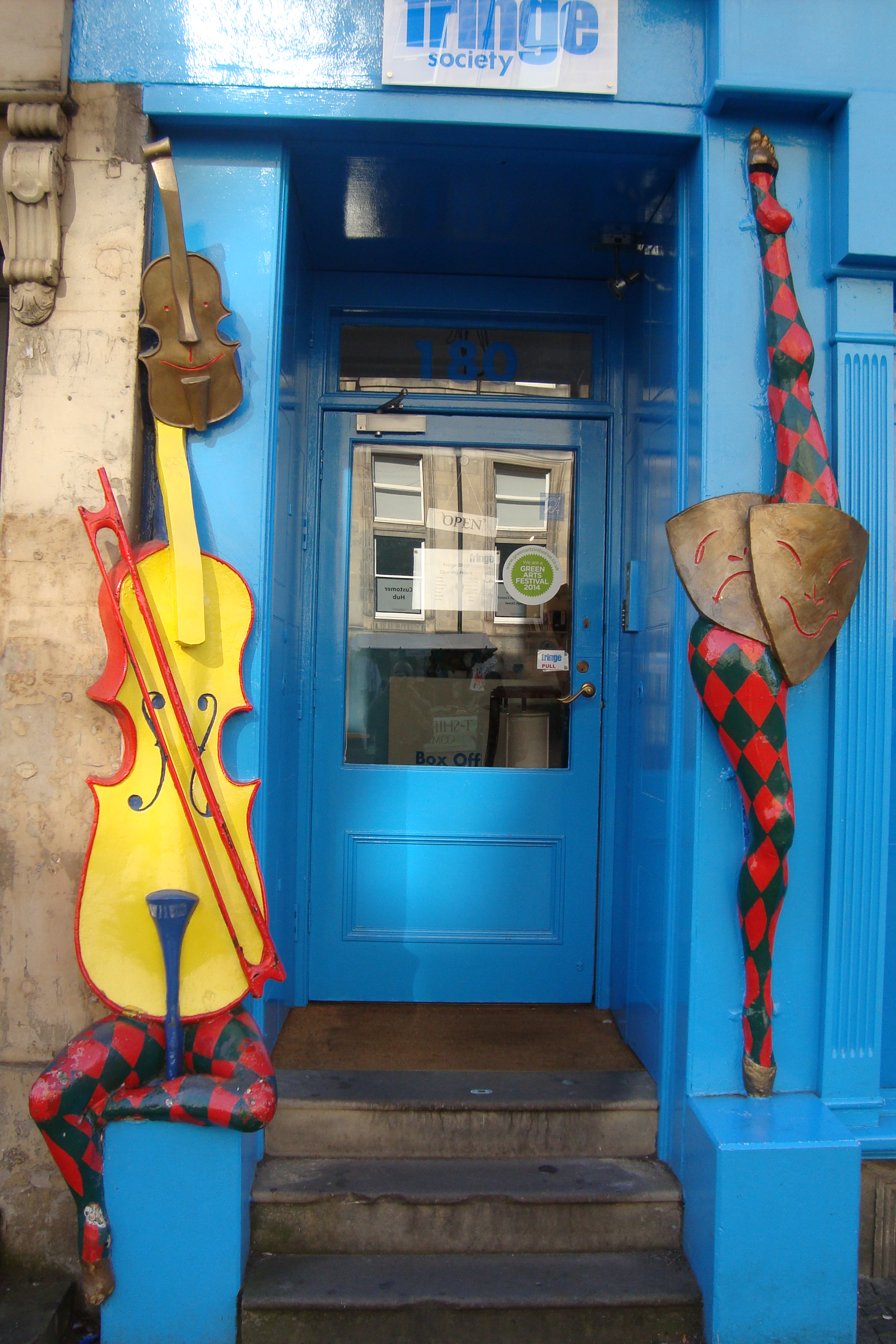
The Fringe Office at 180 High Street

The early 1980s saw the arrival of the "super-venue" – locations that contained multiple performing spaces. By 1981 when William Burdett-Coutts set up the Assembly Theatre in the empty Georgian building Assembly Rooms on George Street (formerly the EIF Festival Club), the investment in staging, lighting and sound meant that the original amateur or student theatricals were left behind. In the same year, the YMCA in South St Andrew Street, which had been an important venue since the early days, closed. However, the subsequent rise in prominence of the Assembly Rooms meant there was now a balance in the Fringe between the Old Town and the New Town, with Princes Street in the middle.

Fringe Sunday started in the High Street in 1981 and moved, through pressure of popularity, to Holyrood Park in 1983. Fringe Sunday was held on the second Sunday of the Fringe when companies performed for free. Having outgrown even Holyrood Park, this showcase took place on The Meadows and continued until 2008.

1981 was a watershed for comedy at the Fringe too. It was the first year of the Perrier Awards, which ran until 2005 and are now known as the Edinburgh Comedy Awards. The alternative comedy scene was also beginning to take shape. Previously, comedy at the Fringe had taken the form of student revues. Now stand-up was becoming a feature. According to Alexei Sayle, "The Fringe then was entirely University revues and plays; there was not a single piece of stand-up comedy until me and Tony [Allen] arrived." Comedy began an ascent which would see it become the biggest section of the programme by 2008.

Moffat resigned as the Fringe Society Administrator in 1981 and was succeeded by Michael Dale, who changed the programme layout and helped the Fringe consolidate.

The following year, 1982, The Circuit became a prominent venue. Run by the Actors Touring Company, it had operated in the south side of the city in 1980 and 1981, but in 1982 expanded into a piece of empty ground popularly known as "The Hole in The Ground" near the Usher Hall. This was once the site of a church building (Poole's Synod Hall), which was converted to a cinema, and where the Saltire complex was subsequently built in the early 1990s. It had a 700-seat marquee auditorium, which hosted, among other things, opera, even though the organisers had been told it was no such place for the artform. The venue also took over the nearby Heriot-Watt Students' Association and the Little Lyceum. In total, it hosted 38 companies. The next year it became a "tented village", with several smaller tents. Malcolm Hardee made his debut here as part of The Greatest Show On Legs. In 1982 the enterprise lost £28,000, and in 1983 there were further criticisms related to over-charging, over-crowding and inadequate facilities. The Circuit was not repeated, but it had demonstrated the potential for temporary venues at the Fringe, which are now a familiar sight.

Even with the rise of super venues, there was still theatre done on a shoestring, but several cultural entrepreneurs had raised the stakes to the point where a venue like Aurora (St Stephen's Church, Stockbridge) could hold its head up in any major world festival. However, in 1982, 24% of the Fringe was housed in The Circuit/Assembly, both of which were being commercially marketed, and this attracted complaints, including from Traverse Theatre founder, Richard Demarco, who felt the Fringe should not have allowed either venue. By 1988, there was, according to former Fringe Administrator Michael Dale, a feeling that "smaller venues may lose out, but this case may be overstated... The episode of the super-venues, the Assembly Rooms in particular, has some way to go yet".

Student shows continued to thrive with the National Student Theatre Company, National Youth Music Theatre, Cambridge Mummers, Oxford Theatre Group and Bradford University producing well-received new work. Among professional companies, the Almeida Theatre, ATC, Cheek By Jowl, Cherub, Cliff Hanger, Entertainment Machine, Hull Truck, Kick Theatre, Lumiere and Son, Medieval Players and Trickster were regulars.

In 1983, the Fringe joined with the International Festival, Edinburgh Tattoo and the Film Festival to promote Edinburgh as 'The Festival City' for the first time.

Moffatt believed the growth of the Fringe would stop due to a lack of venues, but just as that limit seemed to be being reached, groups began to find more efficient ways of sharing spaces. Venues could be fully utilised from 10am to 2am, with up to seven different groups throughout the day. The sharing led to the rise of bigger, more centralised venues. Rents increased too, with a venue like Heriot-Watt Students' Union doubling their rent in three years.

In 1986, promoter Karen Koren established the Gilded Balloon as a comedy venue in the former J. & R. Allan's department store on Cowgate. A 3am late licence made it a home for late-night socialising for comedians, and the raucous late-night show Late 'n' Live was started there.

In 1988, the Society moved from 170 High Street to expanded headquarters at 158–166 High Street on the Royal Mile, with an extension leading back towards the former Wireworks Building. The basement became the new ticket office. Its current headquarters are at 180 High Street.

=== 1990s and 2000s ===
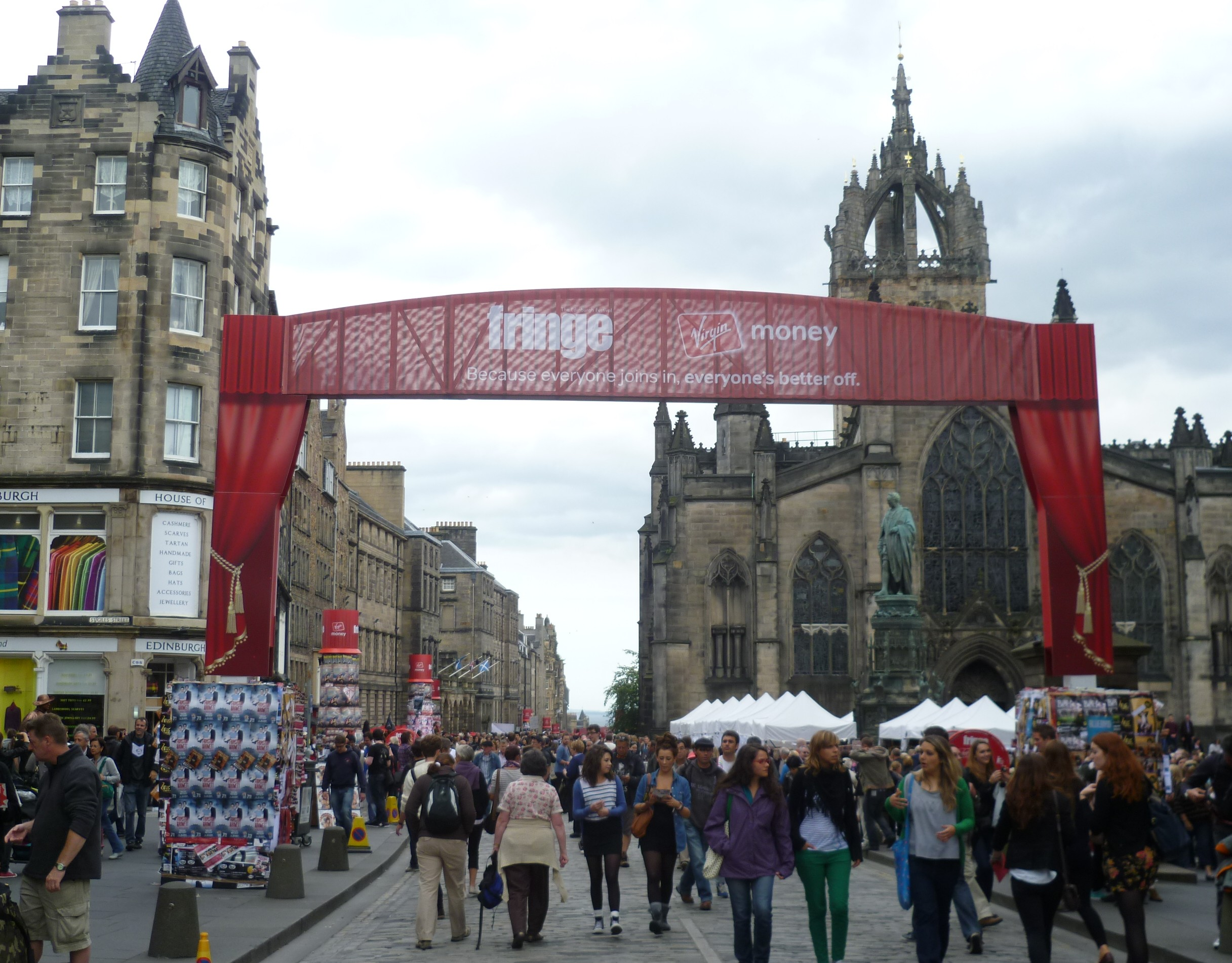
Entrance to the High Street, street performances

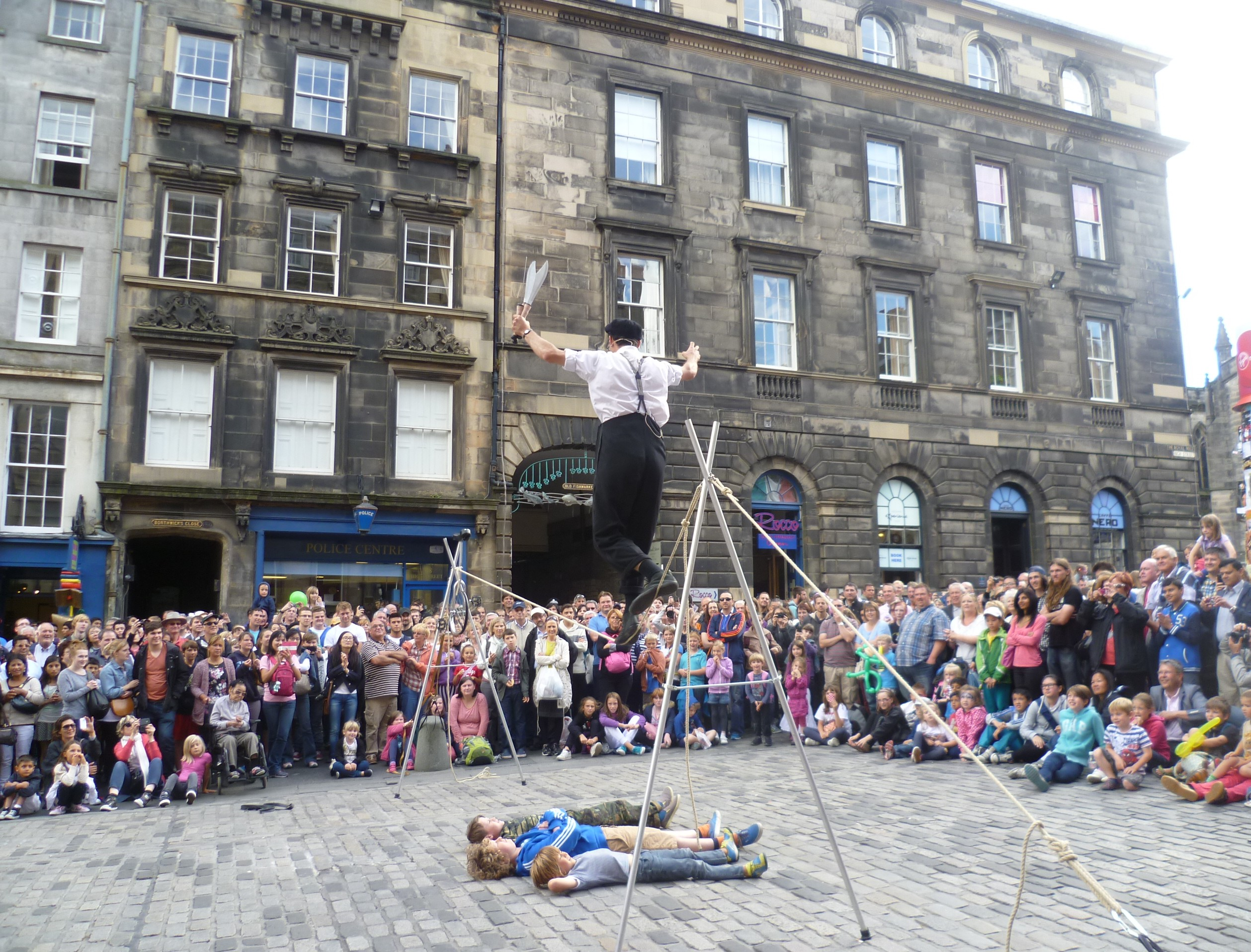
Street performer in the High Street

The Jim Rose Circus performed in 2008, and the Tokyo Shock Boys performed in 1994.

The Fringe Club ceased operation in 2004, but various venues still provide "the Best of the Fest" and similar.

A computerised booking system was first installed in the early 1990s, allowing tickets to be bought at a number of locations around the city. The internet began to have an impact in 2000 with the launch of the Fringe's official website, which sold more than half a million tickets online by 2005. The following year, a Half Price Ticket Tent, run in association with Metro newspaper, started offering special ticket prices for different shows each day. This sold 45,000 tickets in its first year.

In 2008, the Fringe faced its biggest crisis so far when the computerised ticketing system failed. The events surrounding the failed box office software led to the resignation of Fringe Director Jon Morgan after only one full year in post. The resultant financial loss suffered by the Fringe Society was estimated at £300,000, which it was forced to meet from its reserves, although other sources report this at £900,000. These events attracted much comment from the UK and world media. More debts emerged as the year went on, and an independent report criticised the Board and the current and previous Fringe Directors for a failure of management and an inability to provide the basic service.

The Board eventually decided that the post of "Director" (instituted in 1992 in lieu of "Fringe Administrator") would be abolished and replaced by a Chief Executive, to reinforce the Fringe head's basic administrative function. Several venues now use their own ticketing systems; this is partly due to issues of commissions and how ticket revenue is distributed, but was reinforced by this 2008 failure of the main box office.

The same year, other incidents conspired to add to the negative publicity. Fringe Sunday – a vast free showcase of events held on The Meadows – was cancelled when a sponsor could not be secured. The "Big Four" venues - Assembly, Gilded Balloon, The Pleasance and Underbelly - also decided to market themselves as Edinburgh Comedy Festival, which drew criticism from some quarters.

After an interim period, during which Tim Hawkins, formerly general manager of Brighton Komedia took charge, the established Edinburgh Book Festival and Fringe manager Kath Mainland was appointed in February 2009 to stabilise the situation, becoming the Fringe's first Chief Executive.

Comedy finally surpassed theatre as the biggest section of the programme in 2008, with 660 comedy entries to 599.

In 2009, theSpaceUK launched their multi-space complex at the Royal College of Surgeons. In 2011, a new all-year-round multi-arts festival venue, containing ten performance spaces, opened in the former Royal (Dick) Veterinary School under the name Summerhall.

In 2010, the City of Edinburgh Council undertook a £9.3 million refurbishment of the A-listed Assembly Rooms on George Street, in order to improve its all-year-round facilities. The venue was closed for 18 months while the restoration work was carried out, forcing Assembly to establish new venues in George Square during the 2011 Fringe. Although the venue was reopened in time for the 2012 Fringe, and Assembly Rooms once again became a venue, the temporary closure contributed to the Fringe being increasingly based in Edinburgh's Old Town and Southside.

In 2018, an initiative called Fringe of Colour was founded by Jess Brough in response to what they termed the "overwhelming whiteness" of the Edinburgh Festivals.

=== The Fringe today ===
In 2016, Shona McCarthy, who had led Derry's term as UK City of Culture, took over from Kath Mainland as Chief Executive. It was announced on 8 October 2024 that Shona McCarthy would step down in spring 2025 after leading the Fringe for nine years. Her successor, Tony Lankester, started in April 2025.

Along with the other Edinburgh festivals, the Fringe could not go ahead as planned in 2020 due to the ongoing coronavirus pandemic. The Fringe returned in 2021 with fewer shows and restrictions due to COVID-19 pandemic. By 2024, the Fringe registered the second highest number of shows in its history, marking a return close to pre-pandemic levels.

== Venues ==
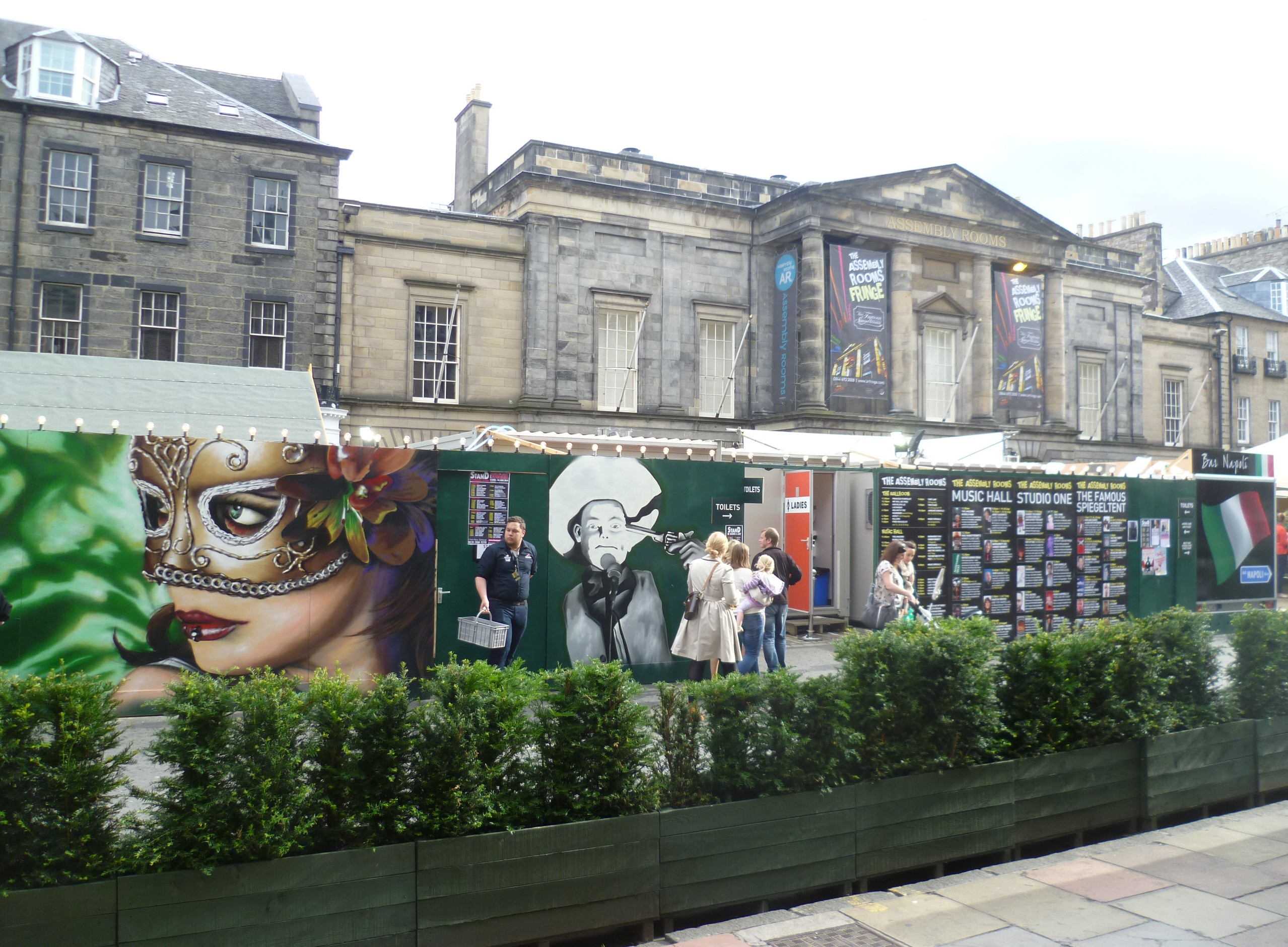
Assembly Rooms and Box Office, 2013

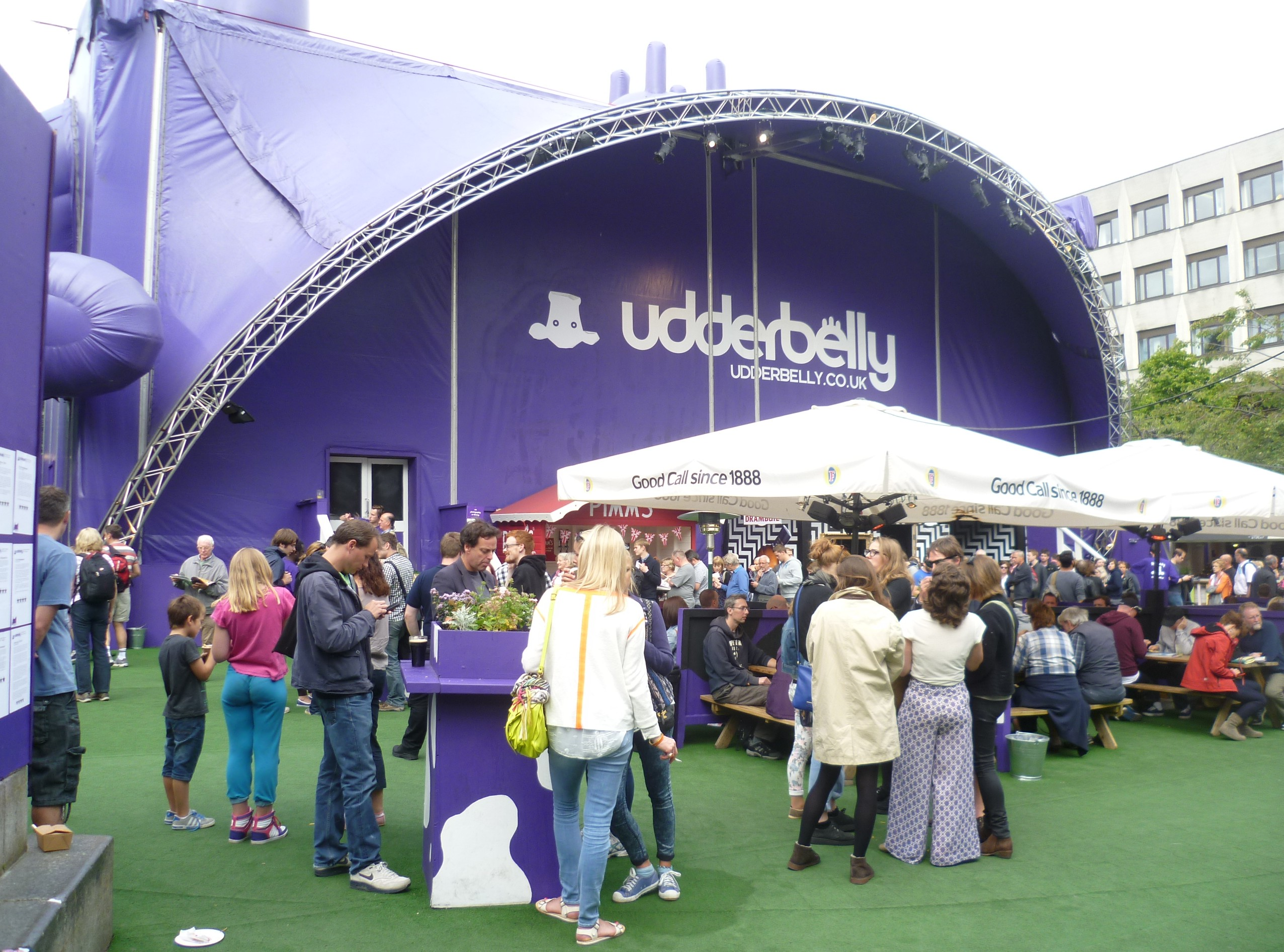
The Udderbelly, 2013

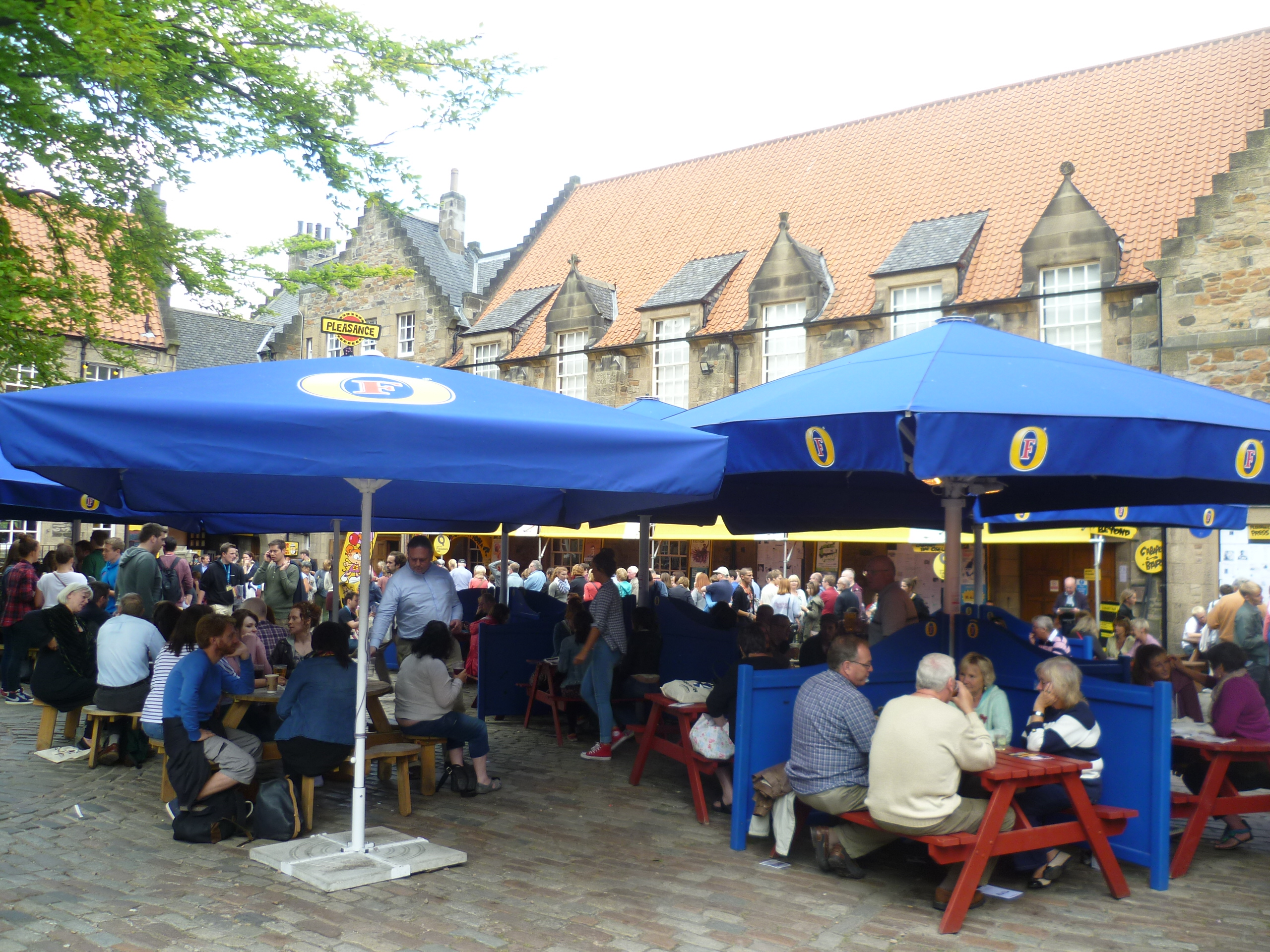
The Pleasance Courtyard, 2013

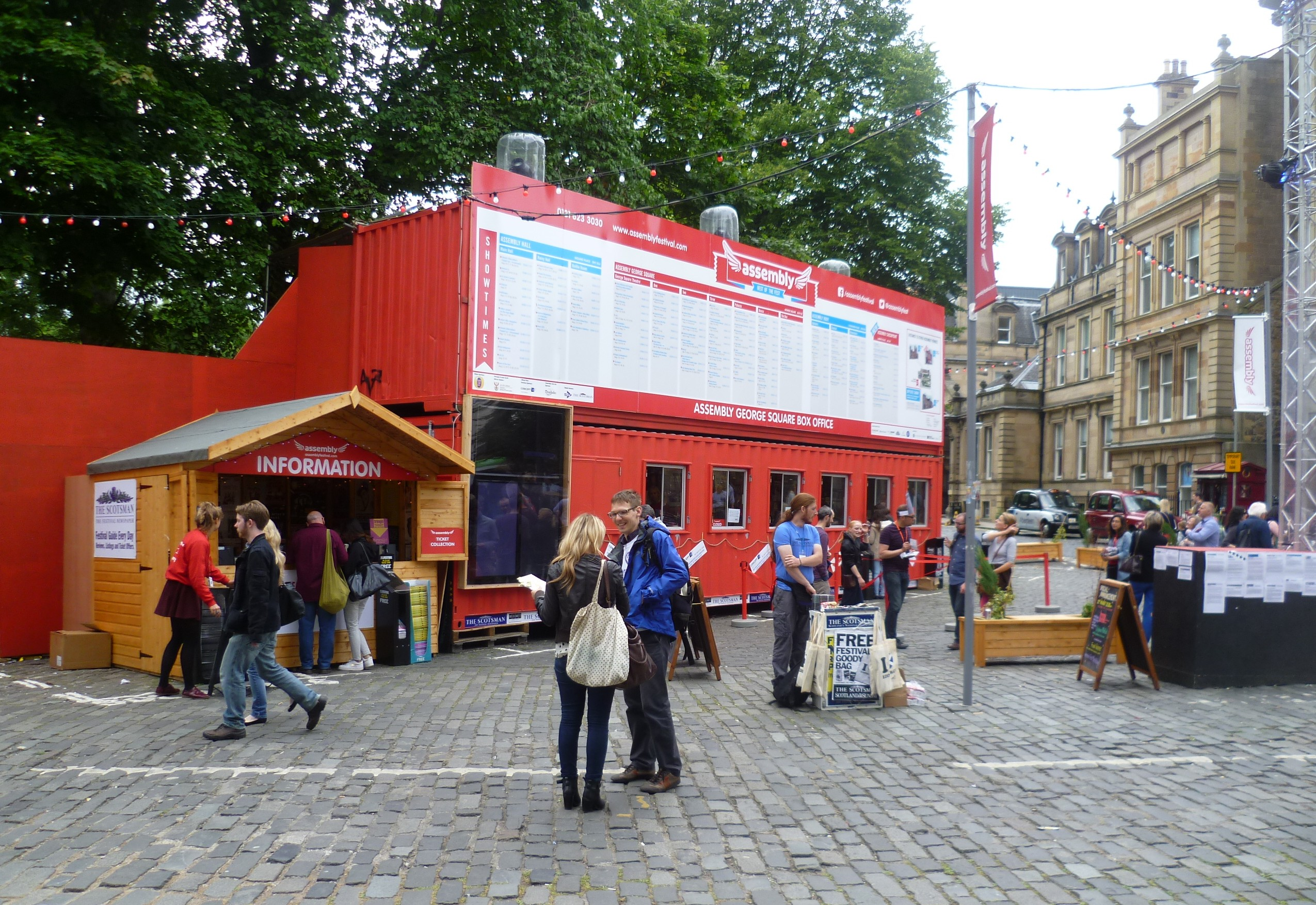
Box Office for the Assembly, George Square venue, 2013

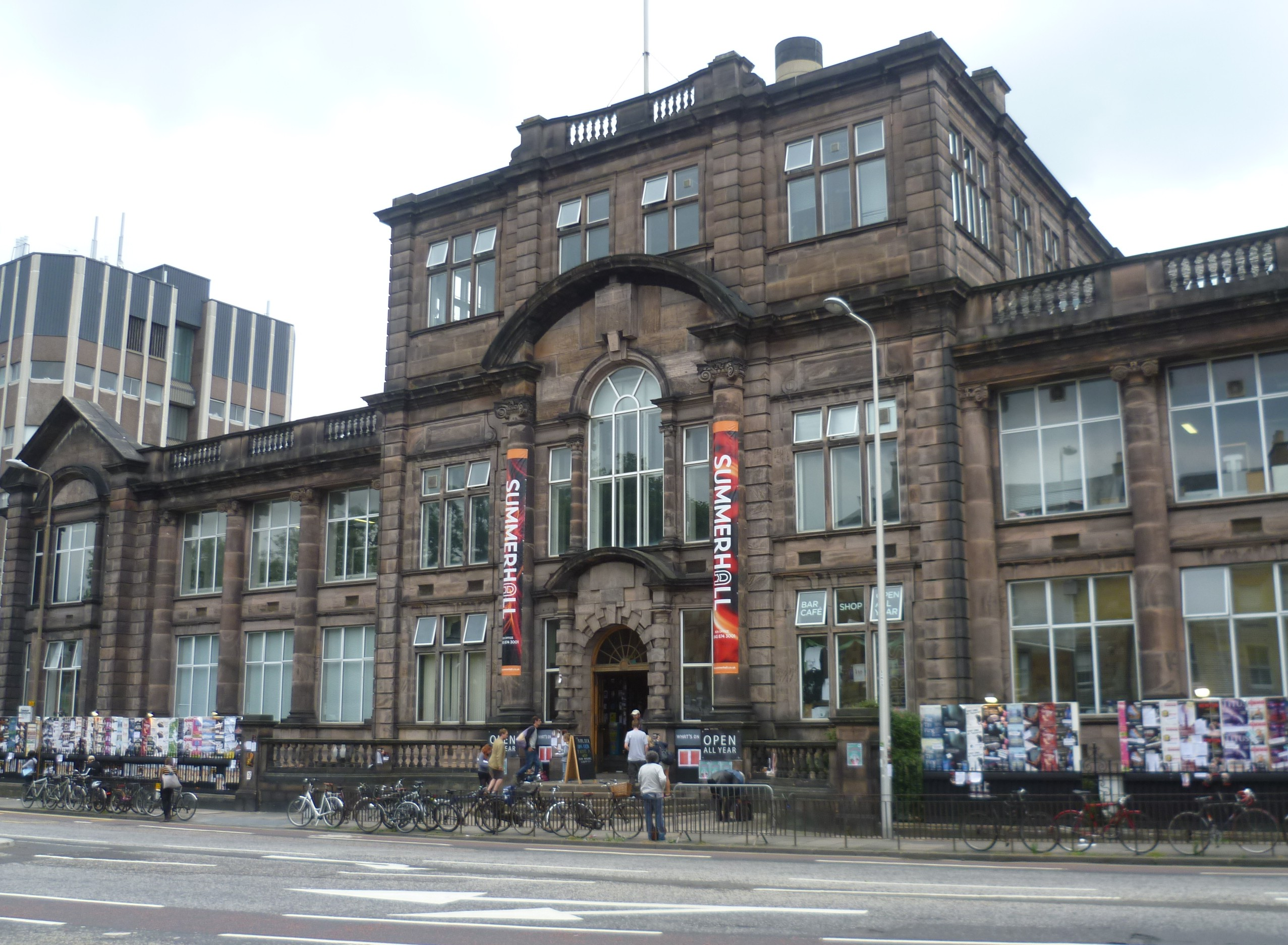
Summerhall arts hub, 2013

Fringe venues come in all shapes and sizes, with use being made of nearly any viable space that is available, from regular theatres (e.g. the Traverse or Bedlam Theatre), function rooms (e.g. the Assembly Rooms), churches and church halls (e.g. the Quaker Meeting House, Paradise in Augustines), lecture theatres (including the notable George Square Theatre), conference centres, other university rooms and spaces, bars and pubs, temporary structures (The Famous Spiegeltent and the Udderbelly), schools, a public toilet, the back of a taxi, a double-decker bus and even in the audience's own homes.

The groups that operate the venues are also diverse: some are commercial and others not-for-profit; some operate year-round, while others exist only to run venues at the Fringe. Some are local, others are based in London and elsewhere and transfer to Edinburgh for August.

From the performers' perspective, the decision on where to perform is typically based on a mixture of cost, location (close proximity to the main Fringe hubs around the university is seen as an advantage), and the philosophy of the venue – some of whom specialise in amateur, school or college productions, some of whom are semi or wholly professional.

In 2019, there were more than 3,800 shows registered in the programme, taking place in 322 different venues.

The main venue operators can broadly be split into four groups:

- The Big Four – Assembly, Gilded Balloon, The Pleasance, Underbelly. The term 'Big Four' being an adopted label. These are in some cases the most long-standing venues (Underbelly being a relative newcomer, having been founded in 1996). They each operate multi-room venue complexes, often across multiple sites. They tend to specialise in comedy, and in 2008, they briefly and controversially tried to re-brand themselves as Edinburgh Comedy Festival.
- Modern Fringe – Besides the Big Four (A term less used at the modern fringe), there are a number of operators running multi-room venues, and again sometimes operating across more than one site. These include theSpaceUK, C venues, Greenside Venues, Sweet Venues, Just the Tonic, ZOO venues, PQA Venues, Monkey Barrel and Paradise Green. They may specialise in certain genres or run a programme across all genres (theSpaceUK, C venues, Zoo Venues and Greenside Venues). Although focusing on new writing rather than comedy, one is larger, theSpaceUK hosted more than 400 shows at the 2019 Fringe, making it the largest operator by number of shows at the modern fringe.
- Free venues – Some promoters use a different financial model. Instead of charging performers to hire the room, and audiences to attend, they make their spaces available for free, with audiences making a donation at the end of the show if they have enjoyed it. These promoters tend to operate out of pubs and clubs – the rooms being made free to use as a way of boosting bar takings. The original Free Fringe was set up by comedian Peter Buckley Hill in response to the increasing costs to performers of appearing at the Fringe. The other main free promoter is Alex Petty's Laughing Horse Free Festival. Although the term "Free Fringe" originally referred to Buckley Hill's operation, it is now often used as shorthand for any free venue.
- Pay What You Want – In 2013, comedian Bob Slayer introduced a new model to the Fringe, at his Heroes of Fringe venues, where punters could 'Buy a ticket in advance to guarantee a seat or Pay What You Want (PWYW) on exit'. The model is a mixture of Paid and Free and enables performers to find a paying audience without risking large marketing spend. Phil Kay, Tom Binns and Miss Behave were among the first established acts to embrace this model along with Adrienne Truscott who won the Edinburgh Comedy Awards Panel Prize with a PWYW show. Adam Hess was nominated for best newcomer in 2015. Other promoters such as Just the Tonic, The Pleasance and C Venues have since introduced the model to some of their venues. In 2016, Gilded Balloon adopted PWYW for the Counting House, which had previously been a Free Festival venue, and has since returned to that model.

There also continue to be single, independent venues, sometimes only hosting one show, sometimes only for a limited period.

During the Fringe, the pedestrianised area of the High Street around St Giles' Cathedral and the Fringe Office becomes the focal point for theatre companies to hand out flyers, perform scenes from their shows, and attempt to sell tickets. These performances run alongside the Fringe Street Events which feature more than 200 street performers and thousands of buskers on the High Street and Mound Precinct. Many shows are "2 for 1" on the first Monday and Tuesday of the festival and different venues operate independent ticket offers throughout the festival.

In February 2025, the Fringe Society acquired the former South Bridge Resource Centre in Infirmary Street for use as their permanent base. As well as administrative offices, the building would provide space for Fringe participants and also serve as Fringe Central during August.

== Shows ==
=== Notable shows ===
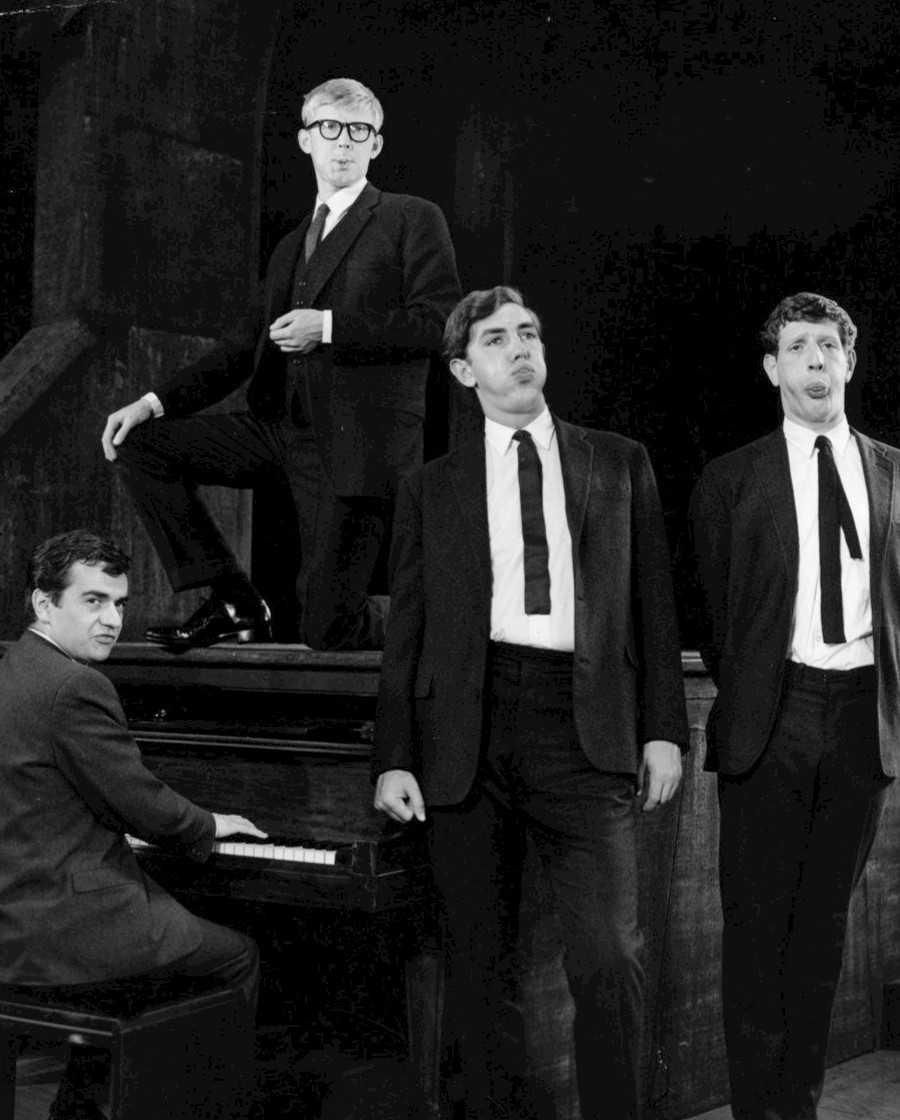
Original cast of Beyond the Fringe

Many notable original shows originated at the Fringe and it has helped establish the careers of many writers and performers, including Rowan Atkinson, Steven Berkoff, Jo Brand, Billy Connolly, Ben Elton, Eddie Izzard, Stephen Fry, Stewart Lee, Tim Minchin, and Tadeusz Kantor.

In 1960, Alan Bennett, Dudley Moore, Peter Cook and Jonathan Miller performed at the Royal Lyceum Theatre in Beyond the Fringe, introducing a new wave of British satire and heralding a change in attitudes towards politicians and the establishment. Ironically, this show was put together by the Edinburgh International Festival as a rebuff to the emerging Fringe. But its title alone helped publicise "the Fringe", especially when it went on to London's West End and New York's Broadway for the next 12 months.

Tom Stoppard's play Rosencrantz and Guildenstern Are Dead was first performed in its full version at the 1966 Fringe. Derek Jacobi starred in a sixth-form production of Hamlet, which was very well regarded.

During the 1980s, the Fringe attracted a number of major touring companies. Joint Stock Theatre Company, a leading innovative touring company at that time, brought two productions to the Fringe – The Great Celestial Cow by Sue Townsend and Fire in the Lake by Karim Alrawi.

In 1986, the Fringe saw the break-out performance of Craig Ferguson as "Bing Hitler", a "parody of all the über-patriotic native folk singers who seemed to infect every public performance in Scotland".

In the 21st century, shows that have debuted at the Fringe and then gone on to wider fame (or notoriety) include Stomp (theatrical show), Black Watch by the National Theatre of Scotland, and Jerry Springer: The Opera.

2003 saw a production of 12 Angry Men staged at the Assembly Rooms using established comedians in the roles of the twelve jurors. Directed and produced by Guy Masterson, it starred Owen O'Neill in the role made famous by Henry Fonda, Juror number eight. Stephen Frost, Phil Nichol and Bill Bailey also featured.

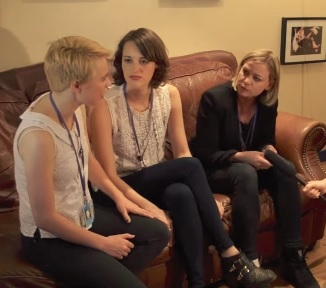
Fleabag at the Fringe, 2013

A 2004 version of One Flew Over the Cuckoo's Nest was beset by problems, including the lead actor Christian Slater contracting chicken pox and the original director, Guy Masterson, quitting the project before it opened. Masterson was replaced by Terry Johnson.

In 2005, a production of Neil Simon's The Odd Couple starring Bill Bailey and Alan Davies also directed by Guy Masterson was staged at the Assembly Hall, the meeting place on the Mound of the Church of Scotland. This had been taken over by Assembly Theatre and transformed into an 840-seat theatre.

The Tattoo set-up at Edinburgh Castle served as the 6,000-seat venue for a one-off performance by Ricky Gervais of his stand-up show Fame in 2007. Gervais was accused of greed and taking audiences away from smaller shows. Gervais donated the profits from the show to Macmillan Cancer Support.

Comedian Alex Horne created and lead the Fringe show "The Task Master" in 2010, which was followed by a sequel "Taskmaster II" in 2011. The idea for these shows was later bought by British television channel Dave and adapted into a comedy panel show. The success of Taskmaster (TV series) led to over 20 series being produced, plus a large number of international versions and a spin-off Junior Taskmaster.

Fleabag, which Phoebe Waller-Bridge first performed as a solo show at Underbelly in 2013, later became a TV series. Phoebe Waller-Bridge was later announced as President of the Edinburgh Festival Fringe Society in 2021.

In 2015, the Sherman/Nicholls original musical production of Love Birds made its premiere at The Pleasance.

Hannah Gadsby's show Nanette won the 2017 Edinburgh Comedy Award and was credited with challenging stand-up comedy convention. It subsequently developed a worldwide audience via Netflix.

In 2017, Toby Marlow and Lucy Moss's musical Six debuted at the Fringe, ahead of a national tour. The show would later go to the West End, then Broadway in 2020.

== People ==
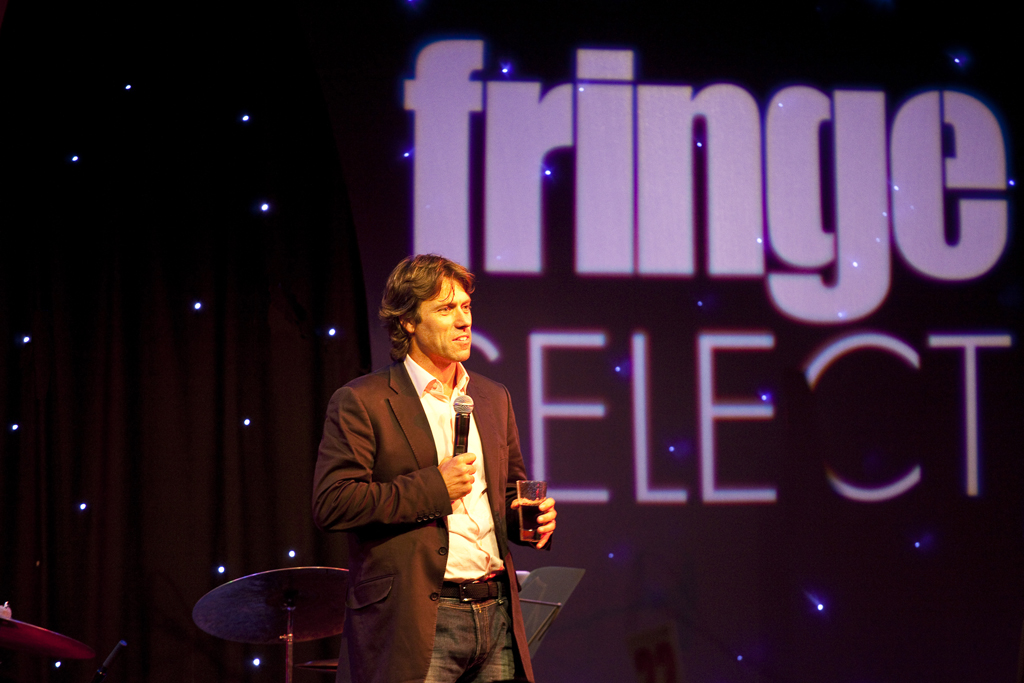
John Bishop performing at the Edinburgh Festival Fringe

=== Veteran performers ===
Arthur Smith, Paul Merton, Barry Cryer and Richard Herring are among the comedians who have performed at more Edinburgh Fringe festivals than anyone else. Arthur Smith has performed regularly at the Festival for more than 40 years (since 1977); Paul Merton has been performing regularly at the festival since 1985. Barry Cryer performed at about 25 Edinburgh Fringes (since the 90s) and Richard Herring has performed at 25 Fringes (since 1987). Nicholas Parsons attended the very first Fringe as a 23-year-old in 1947 and hosted his long-standing Happy Hour show until his death, aged 96.

=== Officials and administrators ===
Jonathan Miller became chair in 1983, followed by Elizabeth Smith, Baroness Smith (widow of former Labour Leader John Smith). The current chair is Benny Higgins, who succeeded Professor Sir Timothy O'Shea in 2021.

The first full-time Fringe chief was John Milligan, who had worked for the Arts Council and been a researcher with BBC Scotland. He left in 1976 to run the Craigmillar Festival, and was succeeded by Alistair Moffat, who had been involved in running the first St Andrews Festival in 1971 and had organised a small festival in his hometown of Kelso in 1972.

Moffat left in 1981 to become Head of Arts at Scottish Television. He was replaced by Michael Dale, who had worked with Moffat at the St Andrews Festival and was recommended to apply by him. He had worked at the Cambridge Arts Theatre and Young Vic.

Dale departed in 1986 to become Head of Events for the Glasgow Garden Festival and was succeeded by his deputy, Mhairi Mackenzie-Robinson, who left in 1993 to pursue a career in business. Hilary Strong served in the position until 1999, when she then became director of the Greenwich Theatre. She was followed by Paul Gudgin (2000–2007), Jon Morgan (2007–2008) and Kath Mainland (2008–2016). In November 2015, Mainland announced her decision to step down as Chief Executive to take on the role of executive director of the Melbourne Festival, and in early 2016 it was announced that her successor would be Shona McCarthy, who had headed up the 2013 Derry-Londonderry UK City of Culture. She took up the position in March 2016, and held it for nine years until March 2025; she was succeeded the following month by Tony Lankester.

=== Promoters and artistic directors ===
The Fringe has made the careers of many on the artistic and organisational side of the Fringe. William Burdett-Coutts, Karen Koren, Anthony Alderson and Charlie Wood and Ed Bartlam, the directors of the so-called "Big Four" venues have become well known on the cultural scene.

== Ethos ==
The Fringe is an open access festival. The role of the Fringe Society is solely to facilitate the festival, concentrating mainly on the challenging logistics of organising such a large event. Alistair Moffat (Fringe administrator 1976–1981) summarised the role of the Society when he said, "As a direct result of the wishes of the participants, the Society had been set up to help the performers that come to Edinburgh and to promote them collectively to the public. It did not come together so that groups could be invited, or in some way artistically vetted. What was performed and how it was done was left entirely to each Fringe group". This approach is now sometimes referred to as an unjuried festival, open access arts festival or a fringe festival.

Over the years, this approach has led to adverse criticism about the quality of the Fringe. Much of this criticism comes from individual arts critics in national newspapers, hard-line aficionados of the Edinburgh International Festival, and occasionally from the Edinburgh International Festival itself.

The Fringe's own position on this debate may be summed up by Michael Dale (Fringe Administrator 1982–1986) in his book Sore Throats & Overdrafts, "No-one can say what the quality will be like overall. It does not much matter, actually, for that is not the point of the Fringe ... The Fringe is a forum for ideas and achievement unique in the UK, and in the whole world ... Where else could all this be attempted, let alone work?". Views from the middle ground of this perennial debate point out that the Fringe is not complete artistic anarchy. Some venues do influence or decide on the content of their programme, such as the Traverse and Aurora Nova, who used to run their own venue but are now just a production group.

The Fringe itself at times sprouts a fringe. While the festival is unjuried, participating in the Fringe requires registration, payment of a registration fee, and use of a Fringe venue. For example, the 2008 registration fee was £289.05. Some outdoor spaces also require registration, notably the Royal Mile. Thus some artists perform outside the auspices of the Fringe, either individually or as part of a festival or in association with a venue, either outdoors or in non-Fringe venues.

Started by Deborah Pearson in 2007, and continuing in 2008, 2009, 2010 and 2011, under the co-directorship of Andy Field and Pearson, a primary "Fringe of the Fringe" festival was held, at The Forest, with support from 2008 to 2010 by the Battersea Arts Centre (BAC) and support from several organisations including the Jerwood Foundation and Queen's University in Canada. Its aim was to encourage experimentation by reducing costs to performers – not charging for space, and providing accommodation. The same applied to audiences: all shows being "pay what you can".

In 2022, the festival's 75th anniversary year, the Fringe Society consulted with stakeholders from across the festival – from artists to venues, residents to government bodies – to create a shared vision and set of values. The vision was "to give anyone a stage and everyone a seat". Rooted in equality and inclusiveness, it was designed inspire all Fringe stakeholders to pull in the same direction.

Three values were also established to guide the behaviours and decisions of everyone involved with the Fringe. The Fringe Society said they would "live by them, champion them and uphold them where necessary". The three values are:

- Celebrate performing arts
- Be open to all
- Look out for each other

== Influence ==
The concept of fringe theatre has been copied around the world. The largest and most celebrated of these spawned festivals are Adelaide Fringe (established 1960 and second biggest in the world), National Arts Festival in Machanda, formerly Grahamstown, South Africa (1973), and Edmonton International Fringe Festival (1982). The number of such events continues to grow, particularly in the US and Canada. (In the case of Edinburgh, the Fringe is an addition to the Festival proper, being officially known as the Edinburgh Festival Fringe. Where there is no pre-existing Festival to be added to, such as New York International Fringe Festival (est. 1997), the word comes before the word "festival".)

In August 2016, the Adelaide Fringe began an official partnership with Edinburgh Fringe.

In the field of drama, the Edinburgh Fringe has premièred several plays and musicals, most notably Rosencrantz and Guildenstern Are Dead by Tom Stoppard (1966), Moscow Stations (1994), which starred Tom Courtenay, and most recently Six the Musical by Toby Marlow and Lucy Moss (2017). Over the years, it has attracted a number of companies that have made repeated visits to the Fringe, and in doing so helped to set high artistic standards. They have included: the London Club Theatre Group (1950s), 7:84 Scotland (1970s), the Children's Music Theatre, later the National Youth Music Theatre under Jeremy James Taylor, the National Student Theatre Company (from the 1970s), Communicado (1980s and 1990s), Red Shift (1990s), Grid Iron and Fitchburg State University. The Fringe is also the staging ground of the American High School Theatre Festival.

In the field of comedy, the Fringe has provided a platform that has allowed the careers of many performers to bloom. In the 1960s, various members of the Monty Python team appeared in student productions, as subsequently did Rowan Atkinson, Stephen Fry, Hugh Laurie and Emma Thompson, the latter three with the 1981 Cambridge Footlights. Atkinson was at Oxford. Notable companies in the 1980s have included Complicité and the National Theatre of Brent. More recent comedy performers to have been "discovered" include Rory Bremner, Fascinating Aïda, Reduced Shakespeare Company, Steve Coogan, Jenny Eclair, The League of Gentlemen, Flight of the Conchords, Al Murray and Rich Hall.

Many performers have spoken highly of the Fringe, and the effect it has had on their career. Magician Paul Daniels first appeared at the Fringe in the twilight of his career in 2013, and commented: "I've become Edinburgh's publicity agent. I tell everybody, 'You've got to be in it.'"

== Controversies ==
=== Subject matter ===
The freedom to put on any show has led periodically to controversy when individual tastes in sexual explicitness or religion have been contravened. This has brought some into conflict with local city councillors. There have been occasional performing groups that have deliberately tried to provoke controversy as a means of advertising their shows, and this has led to censorship of sexual explicitness in such shows. Organisers continued to defend the festival's role as an open platform when they contacted controversial YouTuber Mark Meechan to request that he clarify the fact that he had not been banned, which ran contrary to the punch line of one of his jokes.

=== Ticket prices ===
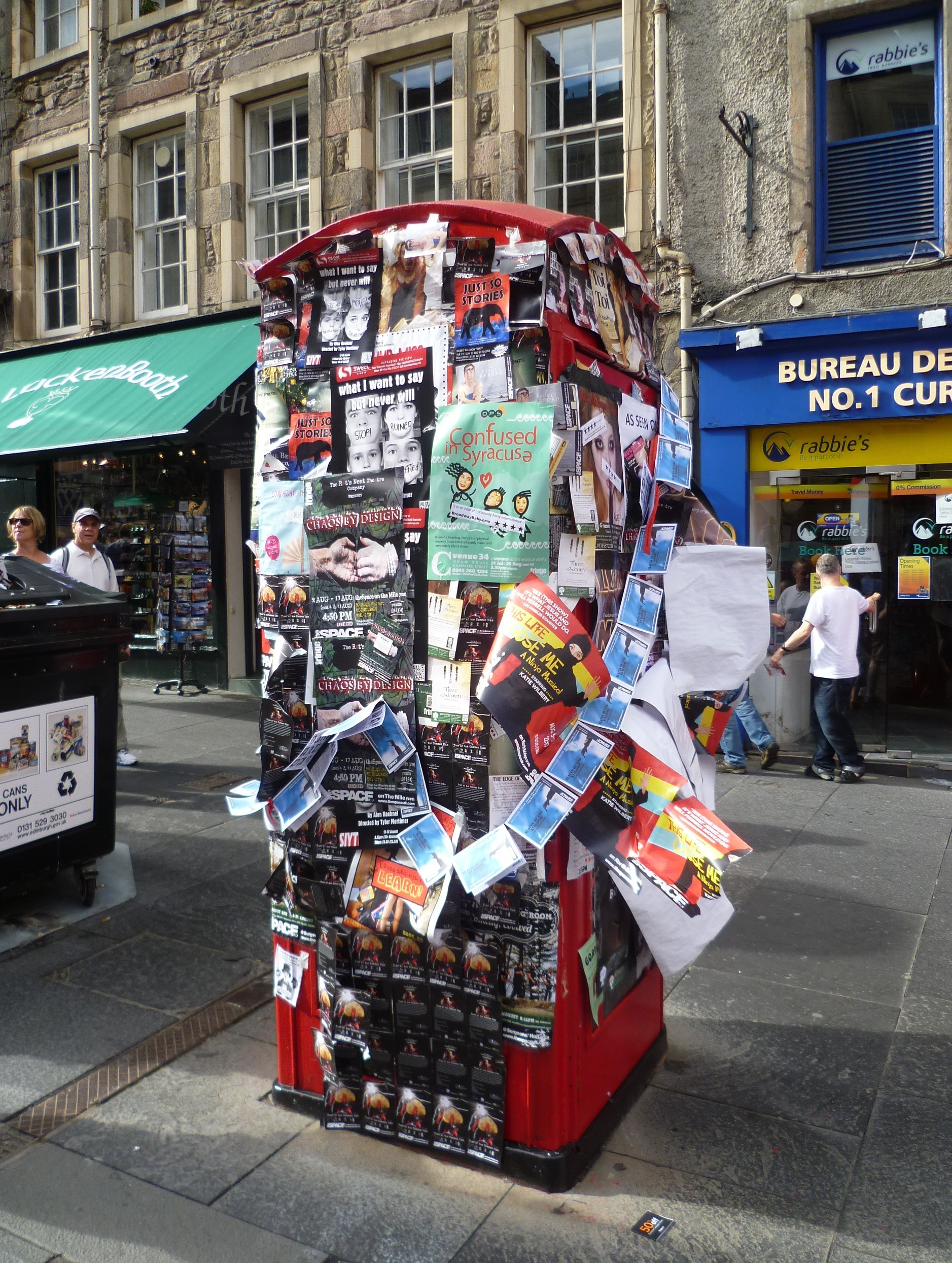
Fringe show flyers and posters compete for space on a High Street phone booth.

In the mid-1990s, only the occasional top show charged £10 per seat, while the average price was £5–£7; in 2006, prices were frequently more than £10, and reached £20 for the first time in 2006, for a one-hour show. Reasons people put forward for the increases include: increasing costs of hiring large venues, theatre licences and related costs—and the price of accommodation, which is expensive for performers as well as for audiences.

In the early 21st century, two organisations — the Free Fringe and The Laughing Horse Free Edinburgh Fringe Festival — introduced free entry shows that collect donations at the end of each performance. 22 shows came under this banner in 2005, growing rapidly to more than 600 in 2011. There was also the "pay what you can" model of the Forest Fringe, and "Pay What You Want" as introduced by Bob Slayer's Heroes of Fringe discussed above.

=== Costs to performers ===
Putting on a show at the Fringe with the big venues can be costly to performers, due to registration fees, venue hire, cost of accommodation, and travel to Edinburgh. In recent years, venue costs and the need for expensive marketing have been increasingly challenged by Free and other Independent venues. There is a change happening at the Fringe and performers can increasingly negotiate with the big venues.

=== Costs to venues ===
Putting on shows is costly to venues as well, due to theatre licence fees which by 2009 had risen 800% in the preceding three years, and were eight times as high as fees in English cities, starting at £824 for a venue of up to 200 people and rising to £2,472 for a venue of up to 5,000 people. These fees have been cited as punitive to smaller venues and site-specific performances by such figures as Julian Caddy, which, between 2003 and 2009, featured venues including Edinburgh College of Art, University of Edinburgh Medical School and site-specific shows in such venues as Inchcolm Island and a swimming pool at the Apex International Hotel.

=== Pay-To-Play ===
In 2012, there was criticism of the increasing commercialism of the Pay-To-Play fringe venues who charge acts to perform in advance of the Fringe. In many cases venue costs such as: venue rents / guarantees, compulsory marketing and various deductions mean that performers are being charged more than they can make back in ticket sales.

Stewart Lee stated in The Guardian: "For decades, the Fringe has been a utopia for artists and performers – but now profit-obsessed promoters are tearing it to pieces." Heroes of Fringe (Previously called The Alternative Fringe) was set up by Bob Slayer as a statement against Pay-To-Play venues.

Some Fringe commentators agree that the Fringe will have to change and that the independent promoters are leading that change.

=== Domination by comedy ===
The comedy section has grown over recent decades to become the biggest section of the programme. The 2008 Fringe marked the first time that comedy has made up the largest category of entertainment. This has led to criticism that it has changed the nature of the Fringe, and separated it from its roots. Richard Demarco has complained of "an infestation of stand-up comics... an epidemic for which there is no cure", which "overwhelms the possibility of serious theatre". Others have commented that a large proportion of newer audiences are drawn almost exclusively to stand-up comics (particularly to television comedy stars in famous venues), and that they are starting to regard non-comedy events as "peripheral".

=== Work and pay conditions ===
In July 2017, a campaign was set up to raise awareness of and challenge alleged poor working conditions during the Fringe. The campaign received support from the City of Edinburgh Council and Unite the Union, among others. In February 2019, Shona McCarthy, chief executive of the Fringe Society, stated that "producers and promoters were being unfairly vilified [by the campaign]".

== Reviews and awards ==
=== Sources of reviews ===
For many groups at the Fringe, the ultimate goal is a favourable review—which, apart from the welcome kudos, may help minimise financial losses from putting on the show.

Edinburgh based newspaper The Scotsman has been integral to the Fringe since the start, and has become known for its comprehensive festival coverage in August. Originally, it aimed to review every show on the Fringe. Now they are more selective, as there are simply too many shows to cover, although they do see almost every new play being staged as part of the Fringe's theatre programme, because of their Fringe First awards. For many years, the Scotsman's Arts Editor, Allen Wright was a familiar figure at the Fringe and today, the young critics' award is named in his honour.

Other Scottish media outlets that provide coverage include: The Herald, Scotland on Sunday, Sunday Herald and the Scottish edition of Metro. Scottish arts and entertainment magazines The List, The Skinny and Fest Magazine also provide extensive coverage.

From the 1990s onwards, Fringe-specific publications emerged. ThreeWeeks was founded in 1996, and Fest followed a few years later. After the turn of the millennium, these were joined by online publications, some of which specialised in the Fringe, some of which had a broader remit. These include Chortle (2000), Broadway Baby (2004), Fringe Review (2006), Fringe Guru (2007) and The Wee Review (2008 as TV Bomb). The latter two merged in 2019.

The now defunct Festival Media Network was founded in 2010 to act as a trade organisation for these independent media. Its members were Broadway Baby, Festival Previews, Fringe Guru, Fringe Review, Hairline, iFringe, ThreeWeeks, The Podcast Network, and WhatsOnStage.

In 2012, the most prolific reviewers were Broadway Baby which published more than 1900 reviews, ThreeWeeks, which published 1000 reviews during August, and The Scotsman with 826 reviews. The List published 480 reviews. By 2019, The Scotsman was once again the most prolific reviewer, followed by The Wee Review.

Most of the London-based broadsheets also review, in particular The Guardian and The Independent, while arts industry weekly The Stage publish a large number of Edinburgh reviews, especially of the drama programme.

Since 2010, the British Comedy Guide has collated comedy reviews from as many publications as possible. In 2018, it gathered more than 4,700 reviews from 135 publications, up from 4,300 from 83 different publications in 2014.

=== Awards ===
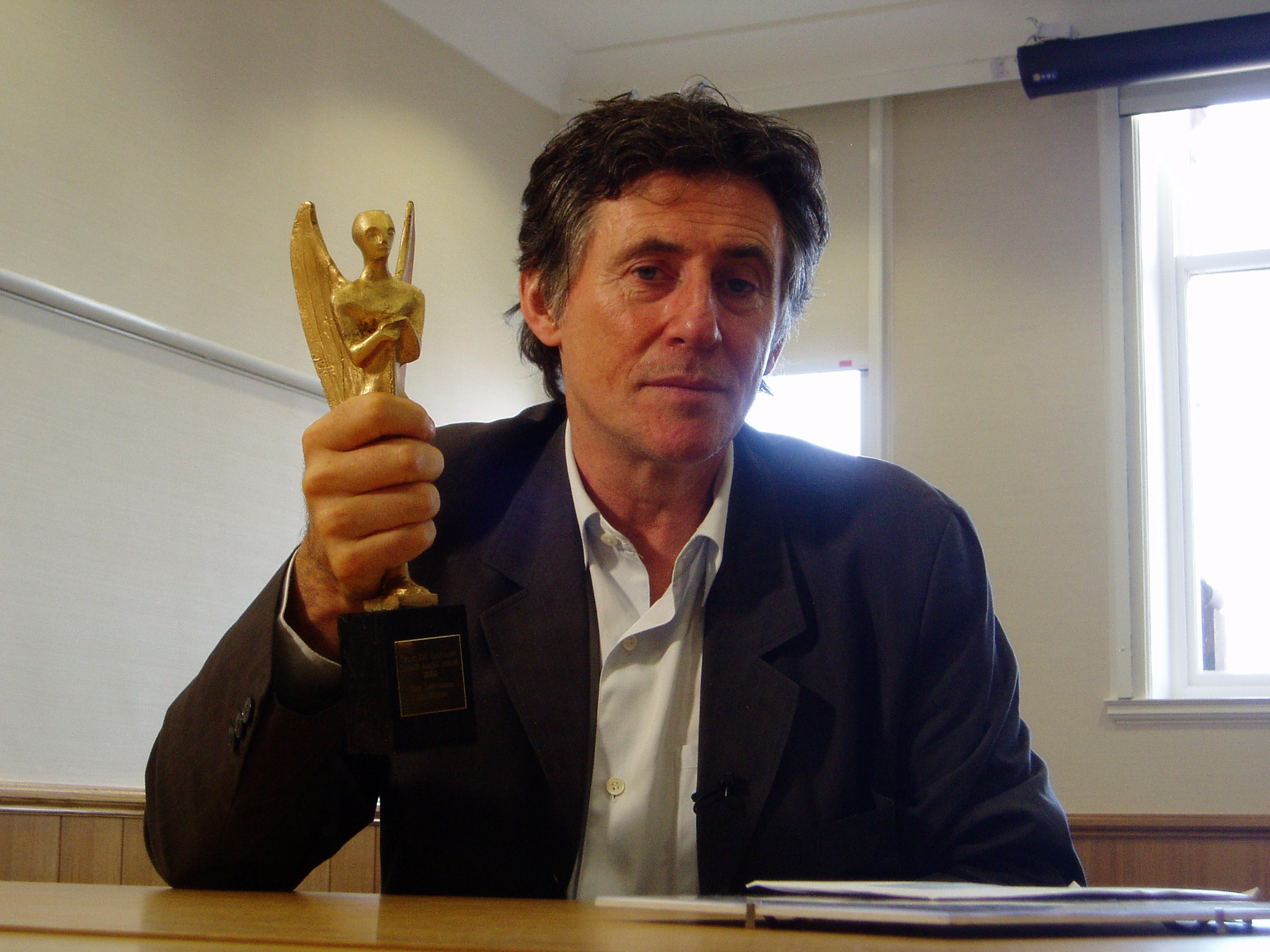
Gabriel Byrne holding his Herald Angel

There are a growing number of awards for Fringe shows, particularly in the field of drama:

- The Scotsman introduced the prestigious Fringe First awards in 1973. These awards were established by Scotsman arts editor Allen Wright to encourage new theatre writing, and are given only to new plays (or new translations), and several are awarded for each of the three weeks of the Fringe – usually by a celebrity at a prestigious ceremony.
- The Stage has awarded the Stage Awards for Acting Excellence since 1995. Around a dozen awards are given out each year, including a Special Award, given for the first time in 2014. Winners of the Special Award to date include Chris Goode (2014) and Pip Utton (2015).
- Total Theatre has presented its Total Theatre Awards for excellence in the field of physical and visual theatre since 1997. The categories under which these awards are given vary from year to year. A notable addition in 2007 was the inclusion of a Wild Card award chosen by the festival-going public.
- Amnesty International introduced the Amnesty Freedom of Expression Award in 2002.
- The Carol Tambor Best of Edinburgh Award for best drama was introduced in 2004. To be eligible for this award a show must have received a four or five star rating in The Scotsman and must not have previously played in New York, as the prize is to put the show on in New York.
- The ThreeWeeks Editors' Awards was introduced in 2005 and are given to the ten things that have most excited the ThreeWeeks editors each year.
- The Bobby was launched by Broadway Baby in 2011 and are given to the best shows of the festival as decided by the Broadway Baby judging panel. In 2012 a second type of Bobby was launched called the Technical Bobby, awarded for technical achievement at the Fringe, such as lighting or set design.
- The Edinburgh Musical Theatre Awards were introduced in 2007 by Musical Theatre Matters, to encourage the writing and production of new musicals on the Fringe.

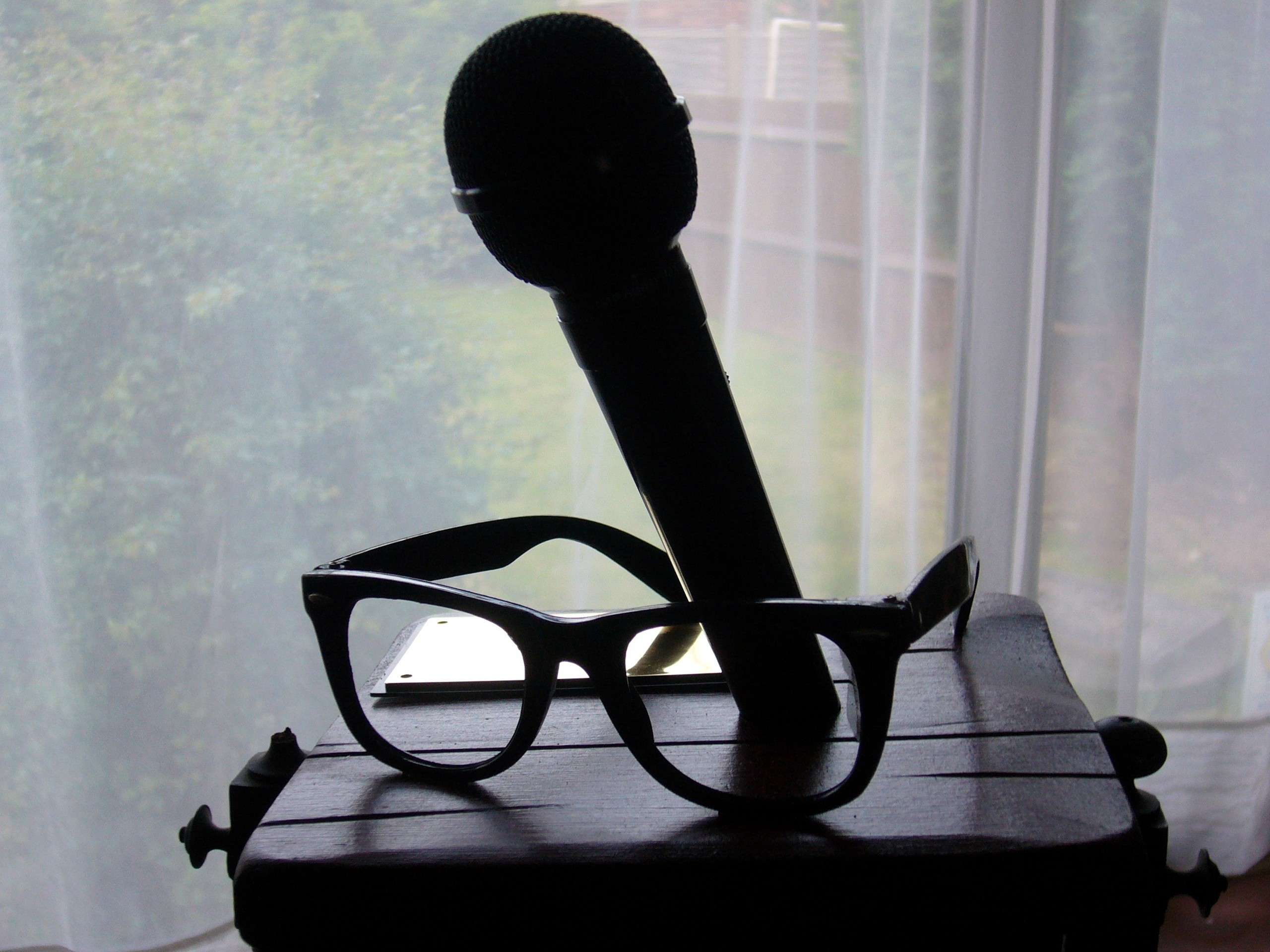
Malcolm Hardee Award

- The Perrier Awards for Comedy came into existence in 1981 when the award was won by the Cambridge Footlights. (Two further award categories have since been added.) Perrier, the mineral water manufacturer ended its long association in 2006 and was succeeded by the Scottish-based company Intelligent Finance. In 2009 IF also withdrew and could not be replaced for 2010, so the awards were temporarily being funded by promoter Nica Burns and rebranded as the Edinburgh Comedy awards, or "Eddies". As of 2024, DLT Entertainment sponsors The Donald and Eleanor Taffner Best Comedy Show and The DLT Entertainment Best Newcomer Award while The Victoria Wood Foundation sponsors The Panel Prize.
- The Malcolm Hardee Awards have three categories - Comic Originality, Cunning Stunt and Act Most Likely To Make A Million Quid They were presented originally for ten years, 2008–2017 and again from 2019, when they were taken over by the British Comedy Guide. An initial one-off Malcolm Hardee Award had been made at the Fringe in 2005, the year of Hardee's death, to American musical comic Reggie Watts.
- Each year since 2009, the Funniest Joke of the Fringe is awarded, along with a list of the top 10. This award is currently sponsored by the TV channel U&Dave.
- The Brighton Fringe Award for Excellence has been awarded at Edinburgh Festival Fringe since 2011, in association with Richard Jordan and awarded at the Scotsman Awards ceremony.

== Statistics ==
The first Fringe featured eight companies performing in five venues. By 1959, there were 19 companies; by 1969, 57; by 1979, 324. In 1981, there were 494, and the growth of the festival began to slow. But by 1999, there were more than 600 companies giving 15,000 performances and in 2010, 1,900 giving 40,000.

Statistics for 2011 Edinburgh Festival Fringe concluded that it was the largest on record: there were more than 40,000 performances of more than 2,500 different shows in 258 venues. Ticket sales amounted to around 1.8 million. There are now 12 full-time members of staff.

Of the shows, theatre had been the largest genre in terms of number of shows until 2008, when it was overtaken by comedy, which has been the major growth area over the past 20 years. At the 2015 Fringe comedy was the biggest artform by number of shows, followed by theatre. The exact breakdown was: 34% comedy, 27% theatre, 14% music, 5% children's shows, 4% each cabaret/variety, dance/circus/physical theatre, spoken word, events, 3% musicals/opera, 2% exhibitions.

The 2015 Fringe issued an estimated 2,298,090 tickets for 50,459 performances of 3,314 shows in 313 venues over 25 days; the 2016 Fringe issued an estimated 2,475,143 tickets for 50,266 performances of 3,269 shows; and the 2017 Fringe 2,696,884 tickets for 53,232 performances of 3,398 shows.

In addition to ticketed, programmed events, the Fringe Street Events is run each day of the festival, primarily on the Royal Mile and at the Mound Precinct.

Year	Venues	Companies	Performers	Shows	Performances	Tickets issued
1947	5	8				
1955		13				
1959		19				
1963		39				
1964		32				
1969		57		c. 100		
1973		105		183	1,386	128,900
1974		131		260	1,645	163,600
1975		143		284	1,971	187,150
1976		202		426	2,928	177,360
1977		194		416	3,561	218,000
1978		286		472	3,852	271,500
1979		324		625	4,180	277,000
1980		380		663	4,963	333,000
1981		454 or 494		739	8,868	
1982		494		890	7,202	460,000
1983		454		875	6,886	425,000
1984		444		883	7,076	430,000
1985		510		1,091	9,424	523,000
1986		494		959	8,592	474,429
1999		>600			>15,000	
2001	176	666		1,462	20,443	873,887
2003	207			1,541		1,184,738
2010			21,148			
2011	258	not given	21,192	2,542	41,689	1,877,119
2012	279	2,304	22,457	2,695	42,096	not given
2013	273	2,402	24,107	2,871	45,464	"almost 2 million"
2014	299	2,636	23,762	3,193	49,497	2,183,591
2015	313	not given	27,918	3,314	50,459	2,298,090
2016		not given	not given	3,269	50,266	2,475,143
2017		not given	not given	3,398	53,232	2,696,884
2018	317			3,548	50,000+	2,838,839
2019	323			3,841+		3,012,490
2020	Festival cancelled due to COVID-19 pandemic					
2022	250+		49,827	3,334		2,201,175
2023	288			3,553		2,445,609
2024				3,746		"over 2.6 million"
2025	301			3,893	55,942	2,604,404
2026	306			4,232	61,277	2,805,395

== See also ==
- List of Edinburgh Comedy Award winners
- Joke Of The Fringe
- List of fringe festivals
- Melbourne International Comedy Festival
- Just for Laughs

== Bibliography ==
- Dale, Michael (1988). Sore Throats and Overdrafts: An illustrated story of the Edinburgh Festival Fringe. Edinburgh: Precedent Publications. ISBN 0-9512-6502-4.
- Fisher, Mark (2012). The Edinburgh Fringe Survival Guide: How To Make Your Show A Success. London: Methuen. ISBN 978-1-408-13252-4.
- Moffatt, Alistair (1978). The Edinburgh Fringe. London: Johnston and Bacon. ISBN 0-7179-4245-7.
