= The List (magazine) =

Arts and entertainment magazine based in Edinburgh and covering central Scotland

- Editor: Brian Donaldson
- Frequency: Monthly; Weekly (during the Edinburgh Festival)
- Circulation: 15,000
- Publisher: Sheri Friers
- Founder: Robin Hodge
- First issue: 1985
- Company: List Publishing Ltd
- Country: Scotland
- Based in: Edinburgh, Scotland, UK
- Language: English
- Website: www.list.co.uk
- ISSN: 0959-1915

The List is Scotland's biggest and longest standing guide to arts and entertainment and was founded in 1985.

The company's activities include content syndication and running a network of websites carrying listings and editorial, covering film, eating and drinking, music, theatre, visual art, dance, kids and family, clubs and the Edinburgh Festivals. Originally launched in 1985 as a paid-for fortnightly arts and entertainment magazine covering Edinburgh and Glasgow, The List magazine switched to a free monthly magazine in 2022 and is released weekly during the Edinburgh Festivals in August.

== History ==
The List was founded as an independent limited company in October 1985 by Robin Hodge (publisher) and Nigel Billen (founding editor). The first editors were Nigel Billen and Sarah Hemming.

In 2007 the company launched its listings website.

In June 2016, The Sunday Times Scotland launched a fortnightly events guide pullout section, produced in collaboration with The List.

After near closing its doors in 2021, The List was relaunched after a successful Crowdfunder campaign as List Publishing Ltd, raising £27,726 from 265 supporters. Sheri Friers is the CEO and its board includes Assembly director William Burdett-Coutts and Dani Rae.

The original company, The List Ltd, changed name to Phylum Forge Ltd, and trades under the name Data Thistle.

Data Thistle continues the live events data services that formed part of The List’s original business, with List Publishing Ltd purchasing listings from Data Thistle.

== Activities ==
The List was a member of the group of organisations who developed an International Venue and Event Standard (IVES). A now dormant project.

The List was a member of the Creative Industries Federation.

== Publications ==
The List publishes several printed guides throughout the year. These include the Edinburgh Festival Guide, the Eating & Drinking Guide, which includes reviews of over 900 restaurants, cafes and bars in Glasgow and Edinburgh, and the annual Guide to Scotland's Festivals. The List also publishes Summer and Winter Festival magazines in Adelaide, Australia.

The List also publishes a series of guides under the Larder imprint. Since 2009, it has published two national editions and more than twenty regional editions. The Larder provides comprehensive information and articles about producers and sources for local food and drink across Scotland.

== Online activity ==
As the print magazine came under increasing competition in the early 2000s, listings were increasingly moved to its website. The network of sites includes minisites dedicated to Film, Food & Drink and Edinburgh Festivals.

An archive (1985–2020) is available at http://archive.list.co.uk.

== Awards ==
- Best Relaunch, PPA Scotland Awards 2022
- Best Brand Extension for The List Adelaide Summer Festival Guide PPA Scotland Awards 2023
- Best Online Presence, PPA Scotland Awards 2003, 2008, 2009, 2013, 2015
- Best Digital Strategy, PPA Scotland Awards 2011
- Allen Wright Award, Fringe Society 2011, 2012, 2016

== Notable regular contributors (past and present) ==
- Phil Kay – Stand-up comedian
- David Keenan – Author, critic and musician
- Lauren Mayberry – Lead singer of Chvrches
- Penny Thomson – Former director of the Edinburgh International Film Festival

== See also ==
- List of magazines published in Scotland
