= Gordon Aikman Lecture Theatre =

Lecture theatre and events venue in Edinburgh, Scotland

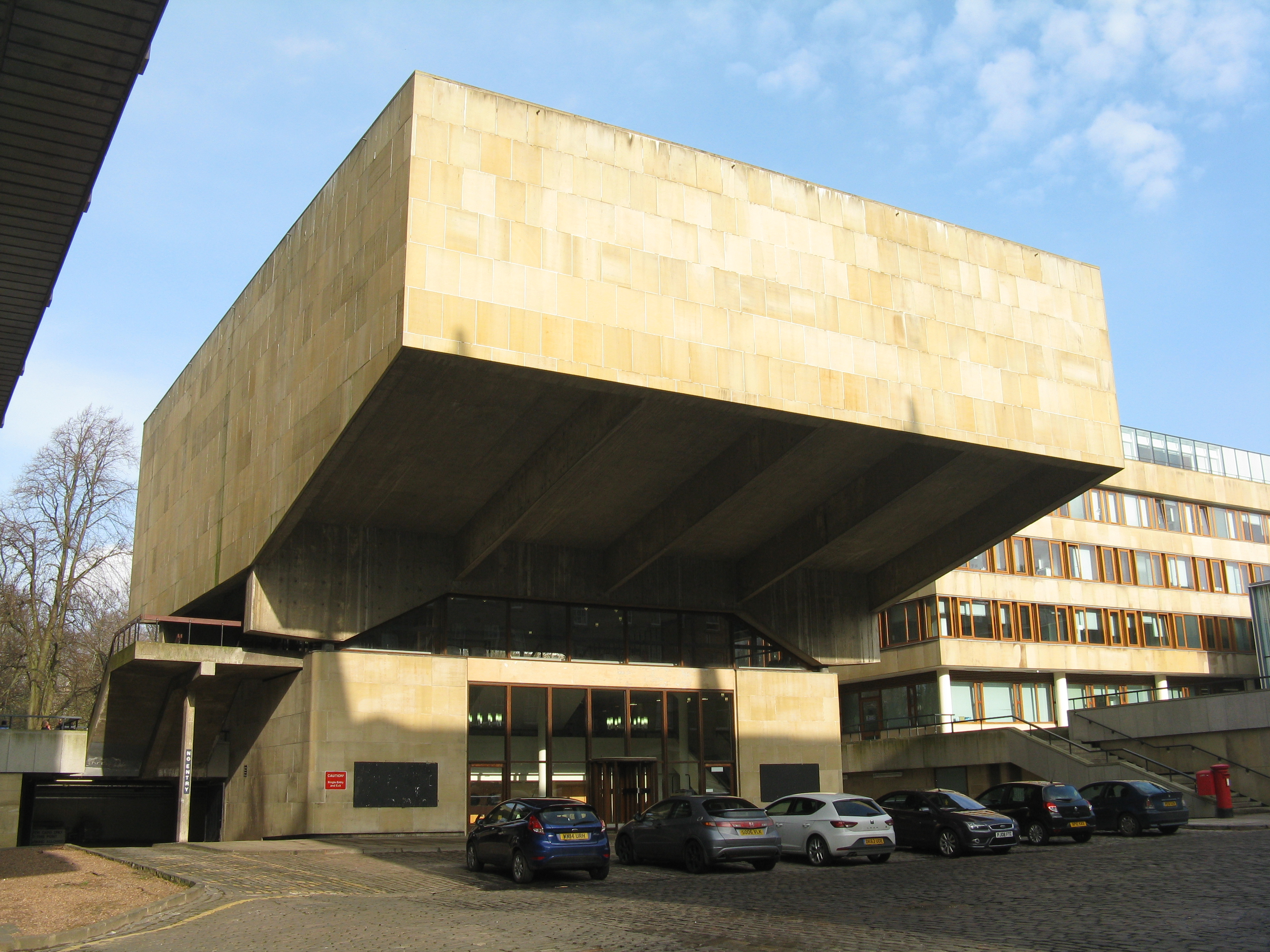
- Interactive map of Gordon Aikman Lecture Theatre
- Full name: Gordon Aikman Lecture Theatre
- Former names: George Square Theatre
- Address: 32 George Square
- Location: Edinburgh, Scotland, UK
- Coordinates: 55.9429°N 3.1882°W
- Owner: University of Edinburgh
- Capacity: 481
- Type: Theatre

Construction
- Opened: 1970
- Architects: Robert Matthew, Johnson-Marshall and Partners
- Structural engineers: Blyth & Blyth

The Gordon Aikman Lecture Theatre is a category B listed performing arts and lecture theatre located in the historic George Square in Edinburgh. Primarily operated as a lecture theatre for the University of Edinburgh, it is also used for general theatre performances, as well as being a designated Edinburgh Fringe Festival venue.

In 2018 the university changed the name of the theatre—previously known as George Square Theatre—in memory of Gordon Aikman, a graduate of the university's business school who raised more than £500,000 for research funding into motor neurone disease.

Construction of the modernist style theatre was completed in 1970, and it opened to the general public the same year. Its seating capacity of 481 makes it the university's largest lecture facility and an asset to the busy Edinburgh Festival Fringe. Since 2011, and while a venue for the Fringe, the theatre was under the branding of Assembly Group, an events promotion company responsible for the operation of Edinburgh's main Fringe venues, which had moved from their original base at George Street in the city. Subsequently, during the Festival the theatre was branded Assembly George Square Theatre.

The theatre's location has allowed its use and popularity to increase, being situated near the Quartermile district development in the grounds of the old Edinburgh Royal Infirmary, along with the building and development of new University of Edinburgh facilities. The theatre can also be seen and accessed from the Meadows, a large park popular with tourists and students.

Due to the building's striking standalone appearance, it has been a popular location for filming and productions, with the facade often changed to suit different purposes.
