= William Burdett-Coutts (promoter) =

William Burdett-Coutts OBE is the founder and director of theatre and comedy promotion company Assembly, one of the major venue operators at the Edinburgh Festival Fringe, the world's largest arts festival. He was the Chief Executive and artistic director of the Riverside Studios in London.

He was born in Zimbabwe, and began his career as a theatre director in Scotland in the late 1970s, before establishing the Assembly Rooms as a fringe theatre venue in 1981, leasing it from Edinburgh Council. The venue has been referred to as the "National Theatre of the Fringe".

Burdett-Coutts came to operate the venue after he was too late to find anywhere else to stage the play he intended to bring to the Fringe, The Madman and the Nun. He was working at the Old Vic at the time. The Assembly Rooms on George Street had previously been home to the Festival Club, but they had vacated the building after finding it unprofitable to operate. This left it available for Burdett-Coutts, and gave him space to host other shows.

Burdett-Coutts fought for the Assembly Rooms to remain a venue only building, against Edinburgh Council's plan to turn the ground floor space into shops and a restaurant.

Burdett-Coutts established the Brighton Comedy Festival and Manchester's Festival of Arts and Television, and directed Glasgow's Mayfest and the Channel 4 Sitcom Festival,

He was appointed Officer of the Order of the British Empire (OBE) in the 2021 Birthday Honours for services to theatre, comedy and the arts.
