= Broadway Baby =

- Website type: Reviewing Publication
- Available in: English
- Owner: Web Editors Ltd
- Editors: Richard Beck (Editor-in-Chief), Levi Bailey (Managing Editor), Taylor Hunter (Senior Editor, Head of Business), James MacFarlane (Scotland Editor), Nick Abrams (Brighton),
- Website: www.broadwaybaby.com
- Commercial: yes
- Registration: Optional
- Launched: 1 August 2004; 22 years ago
- Current status: Active
- Content license: Copyright

Broadway Baby is a British online review guide and arts news website which launched in 2004. It is the most prolific reviewing publication at the Edinburgh Festival Fringe from 2012 onward. It contains reviews of music, comedy, theatre and dance at the Edinburgh Festival Fringe, Brighton Fringe, Camden Fringe and year-round in London and Central Scotland. Formerly, a printed version was also published.

== Company history ==
Broadway Baby was founded to cover the Edinburgh Festival Fringe in 2004. In 2006 Broadway Baby started one of the first video podcasts of the Edinburgh Festival Fringe. In 2008 coverage started of the Brighton Fringe and in 2012 Broadway Baby launched year-round review coverage in London. In August 2012, Broadway Baby also comprehensively covered the Camden Fringe for the first time. The appointment of a Scotland Editor in 2014 has ensured some coverage of theatre in Edinburgh outside of August, and also from the major producing theatres in Glasgow and Dundee. Since 2016 Broadway Baby have been proactively reviewing shows in London's West End.

Broadway Baby recruits a volunteer review team who have practical experience in performance and the ability to communicate through the written word. During the Edinburgh Festival Fringe the team includes approximately 100 reviewers and 20 editorial staff who schedule and edit reviews.

Broadway Baby was a founder member of the now defunct Festival Media Network.

== Circulation ==
Readership of Broadway Baby varies during the year with a peak in August during the Edinburgh Festival Fringe. Website visitors in August 2015 were in excess of 200,000 with over 6.7 million page views. Broadway Baby published a printed review guide called Broadway Baby Review from 2005-2014. 20,000 copies were distributed every other day to the main festival venues.

== Content ==
Broadway Baby lists events free-of-charge using data obtained direct from the various Fringe organisations. Review content is attached directly to a listing. Broadway Baby also allows the audience to review shows in addition to their in-house team of reviewers.

In 2012 Broadway Baby became the largest reviewer at the Edinburgh Festival Fringe after publishing over 1900 reviews during August alone, overtaking ThreeWeeks which had previously been the largest reviewer at the Festival. As of 2018, following a reduction in the volume of Fringe reviews it does, it is no longer the most prolific reviewer at the Fringe.

It ceased print publication in 2014.
