= Assembly (events promoter) =

Event promotion company of the United Kingdom

Assembly Festival Ltd.
- Type: Private company
- Industry: Arts
- Headquarters: Edinburgh, Scotland, UK
- Products: Theatre and comedy promotion, productions and venues
- Website: http://www.assemblyfestival.com

Assembly is a theatre and comedy promotion company, producer and venue operator. It programmes and promotes entertainment events at venues in Edinburgh, London and Brighton, and is the longest-established of the so-called Big Four promoters at the Edinburgh Festival Fringe in August. Year-round audience numbers at Assembly events are more than 500,000, and the company's artistic director is William Burdett-Coutts.

== History ==
Assembly can trace its roots back to the 1981 Edinburgh Fringe when William Burdett-Coutts, who at the time was working at the Old Vic, intended to bring a show to the Fringe, The Madman and the Nun. However, he had left it too late to organise a venue. Fortunately, the Assembly Rooms on George Street had been vacated by the Festival Club, which had found it unprofitable to operate there. This meant there was space for Burdett-Coutts to host both his own show, and others. This was the foundation of the company which would become one of the "Big Four" Fringe venues, promoting shows at multiple venues across the city.

An early success was Alternative Cabaret, a show featuring Tony Allen, Jim Barclay, Andy de la Tour and Pauline Melville, which became one of the critical hits of 1981.

== Edinburgh ==
=== Assembly Festival ===
During August, as part of the Edinburgh Festival Fringe, and under the title "Assembly Festival", the company now operates seventeen theatre spaces, and eight bars. In 2015, the Assembly Festival programme consisted of 163 shows, including performances by Milton Jones, Adam Hills and Jason Byrne.

The company has been running events at the Fringe since the early 1980s, originally at the Assembly Rooms, from which the name is derived. In recent years, the contract for operating the Assembly Rooms building during the Fringe has been awarded to the promoters behind The Stand Comedy Club, separating the company from its origins. However, from 2016, the company will again be operating the building.

In more recent times, the Assembly has been based in and around George Square, and has made particular use of the George Square Theatre, having rebranded it as Assembly George Square.

The entire Assembly Festival operation is three times the size of the Edinburgh International Festival and plays to audiences the equivalent of the BBC Proms.

=== Assembly Roxy ===
Assembly Roxy in 2012

Assembly also run a year-round venue in Edinburgh in a converted church building near the main university campus. It is named the Assembly Roxy after the street on which it stands, Roxburgh Place. It hosts a small theatre, music and comedy programme, and also operates as a function suite for weddings and corporate events.

The current building dates to the early 20th century, when it was built to replace an old chapel on the site. That previous chapel - a "dark, oddly-shaped building" - had been taken over in 1856 by the congregation of Lady Glenorchy's Parish Church, who had moved there when their original church was demolished in the development of Waverley Station. In 1904, the minister, Reverend Thomas Burns, decided to rebuild the church to better meet the needs of the people. It was built in 2 stages - the hall, by Thomas Ross, in 1908-10 and the church, by Peter MacGregor Chalmers, in 1912–13. It cost £21,000 and opened in December 1913. As Lady Glenorchy South Church (to distinguish it from Lady Glenorchy's Free Church in Greenside which became the North Church) it became one of the busiest churches in Edinburgh. The congregation diminished with the demolition of surrounding tenements in the mid 20th century. In 1969, it was sold to the University of Edinburgh, and used as an examination hall, under the name "Roxburgh Place Hall". During this time, it also served as a venue for the Fringe, under the management of the nearby Pleasance as "Pleasance Over The Road". The Edinburgh University Settlement charity, which owned the building, went bankrupt in 2010, and the building was bought by Assembly in a joint deal with restaurateur Malcolm Innes to become Assembly's first permanent Edinburgh home.

It has four performance spaces, including the 250-seater Roxy Central, and a snug bar in the basement.

=== Assembly Checkpoint ===
Plans are also being discussed for the permanent conversion of another of Assembly's Fringe venues, Assembly Checkpoint, into a year-round music venue. The building, a former church built in 1900, was taken over by Assembly in 2012. It is situated on Bristo Place, near the National Museum of Scotland. The plan is for live music events to be held on the upper floor of the Grade B listed building, which has been soundproofed.

== Brighton ==
In September, Assembly run Brighton Comedy Festival, a curated festival, operating across five venues. In 2014, the festival featured 140 acts across 16 days including Simon Amstell, Bridget Christie, Marcus Brigstocke, Jack Dee and Seann Walsh.

== London ==
Assembly's London base is at Riverside Studios in Hammersmith. Riverside is currently under redevelopment, with a plan to reopen in 2018 will as a national live and digital arts hub.

== Bibliography ==
- Fisher, Mark (2012). The Edinburgh Fringe Survival Guide: How To Make Your Show A Success. London: Methuen. ISBN 978 1 408 13252 4.
