= Pleasance Theatre Trust =

English event operator

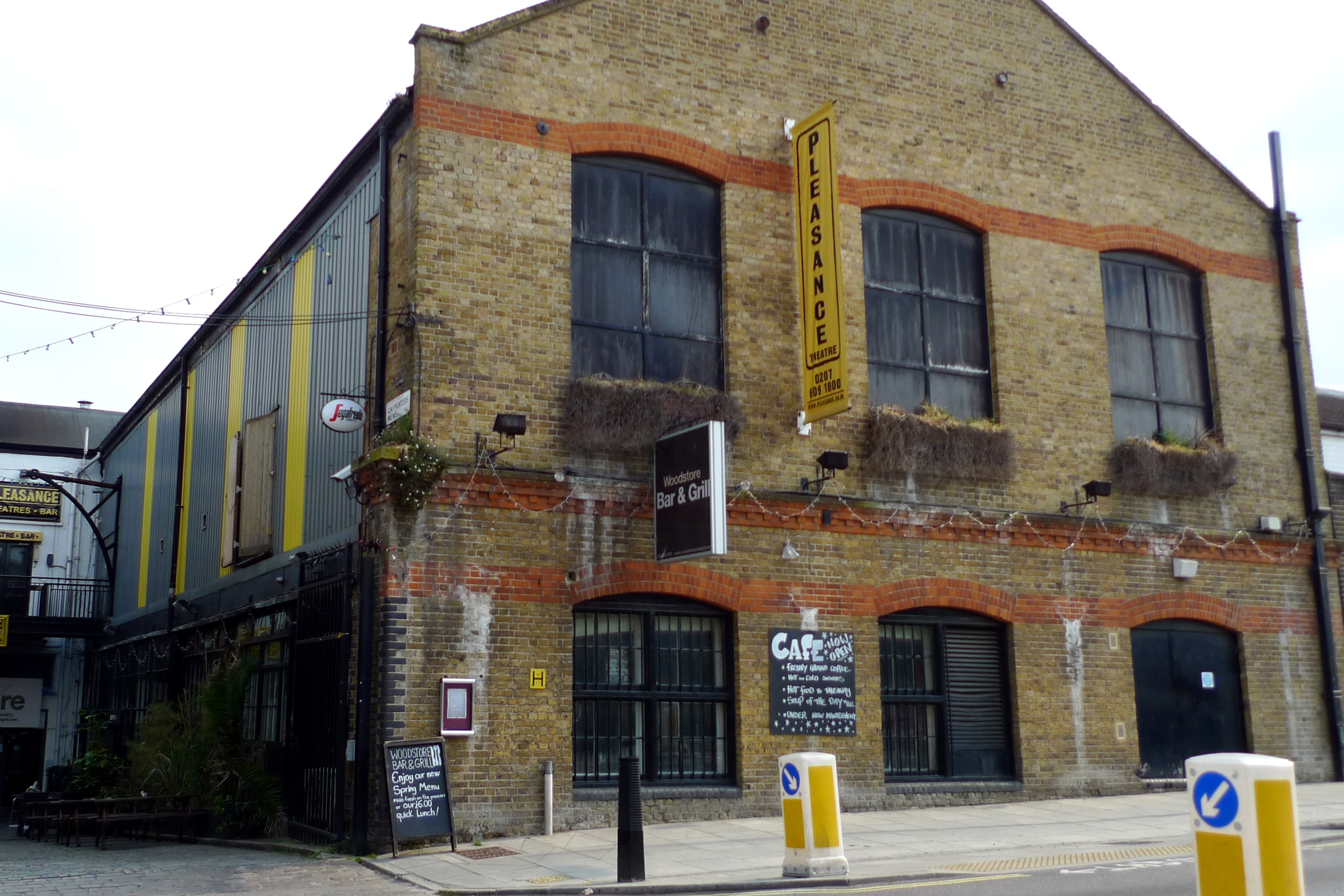
- The Trust's headquarters at the Pleasance Theatre in Islington, London
- Named after: The Pleasance, Edinburgh
- Formation: 1994; 32 years ago
- Website: pleasance.co.uk

The Pleasance Theatre Trust (often simply called The Pleasance) is a venue operator and producer of live events, known internationally for being one of the major, so-called "Big Four", operators at the Edinburgh Festival Fringe, the world's largest arts festival. The trust is named after The Pleasance, the students' union venue complex which it runs in Edinburgh during the Fringe, although the organisation's operations have expanded from that original base to include other venues, including the Potterrow Student Centre (branded as Pleasance Dome) during the Fringe, Pleasance @ EICC, and a year-round base in London, Pleasance Islington.

Fringe events were first held under "The Pleasance" banner in 1985, although the trust itself was only founded in 1994, before the Pleasance Islington was established in 1995.

== Gallery ==
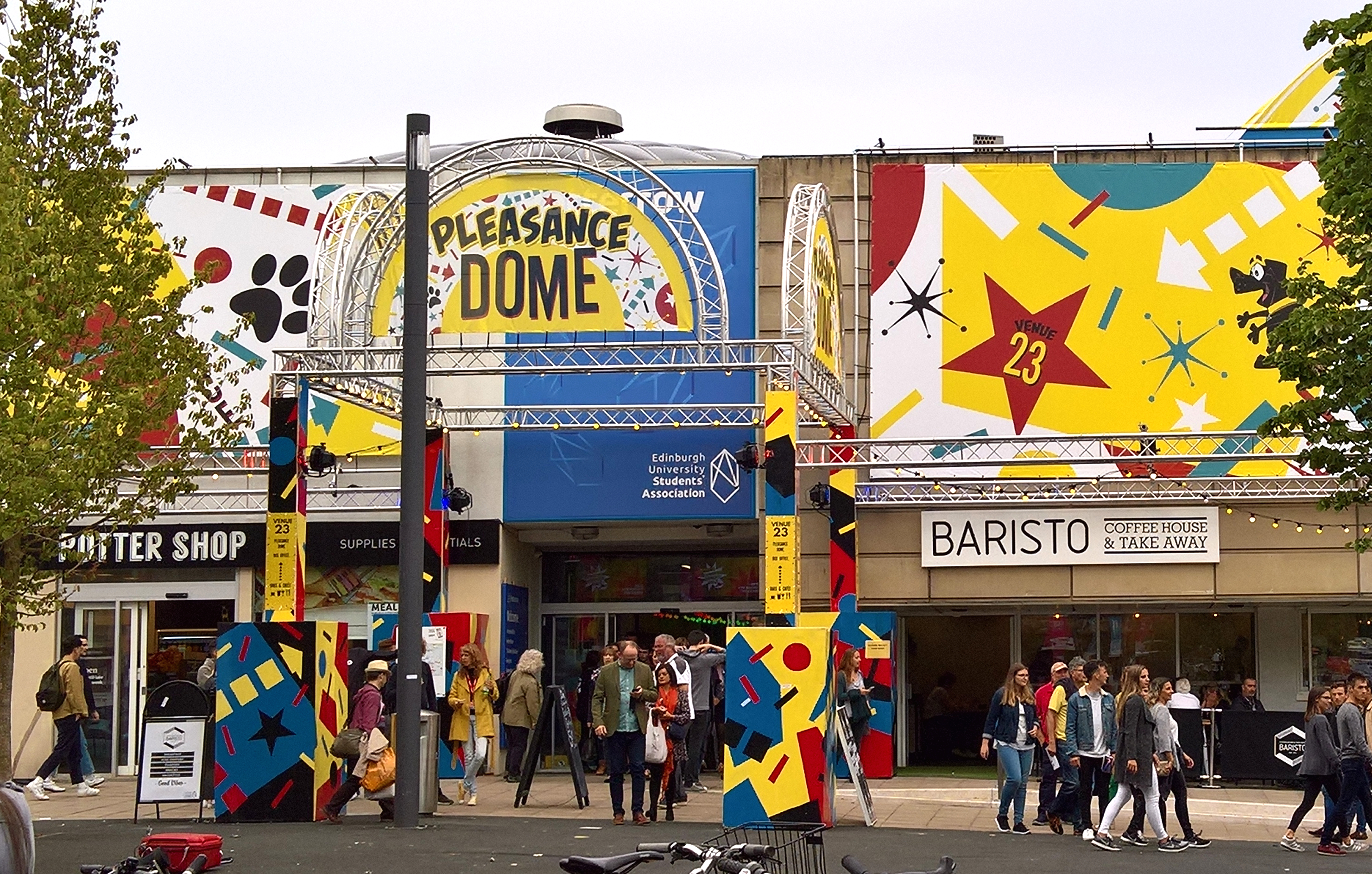
The 'Pleasance Dome' at Potterrow during the 2018 festival

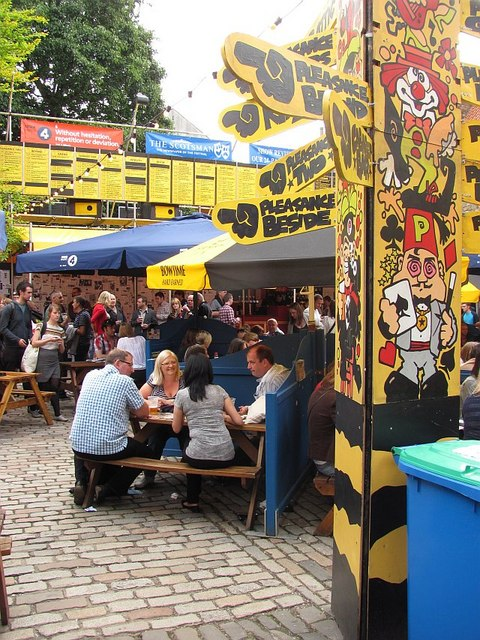
The Pleasance courtyard beer garden in 2010

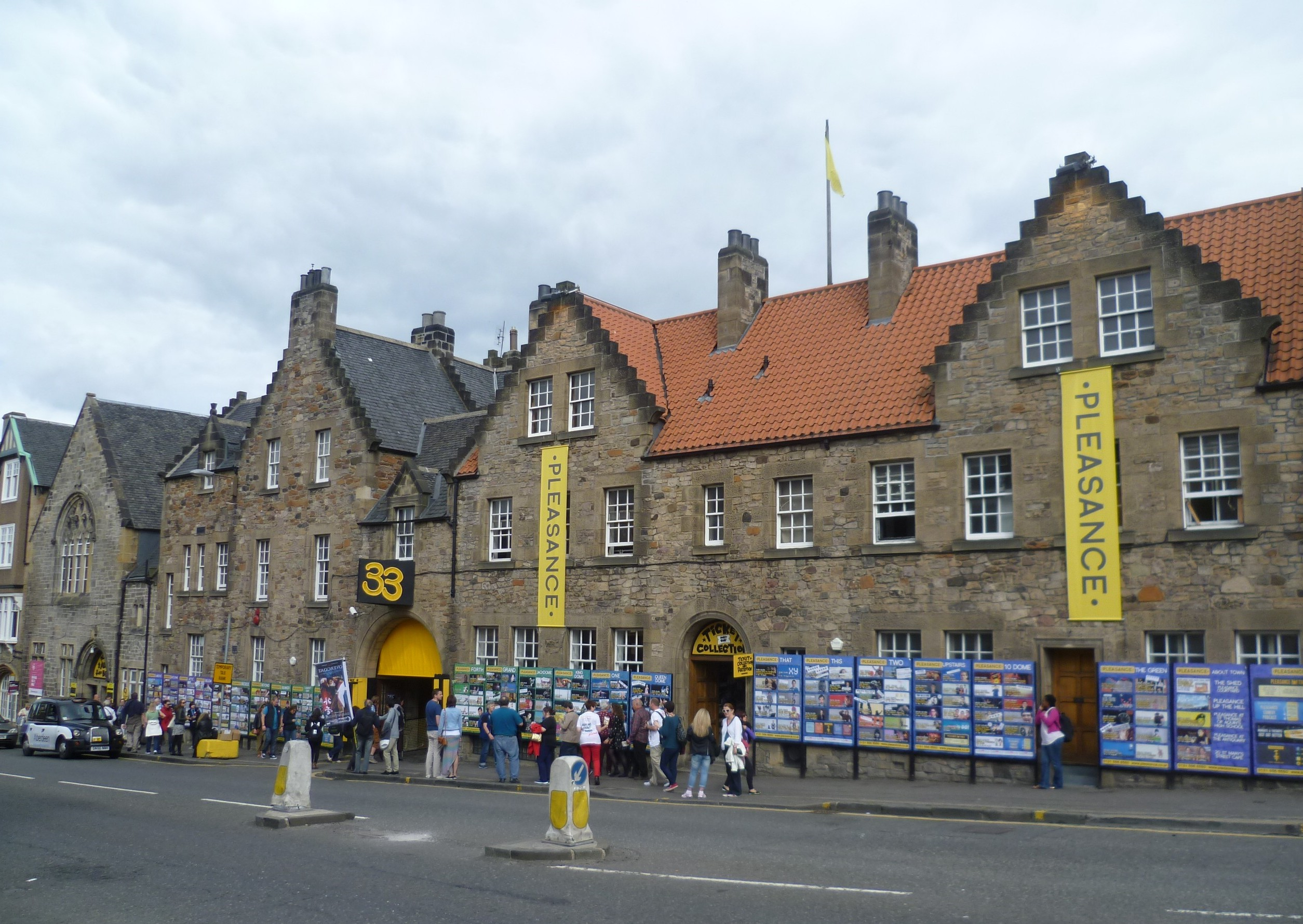
The Pleasance during the 2013 Edinburgh Fringe Festival
