= ThreeWeeks =

Weekly arts magazine

- Editor: Caro Moses
- Categories: Arts magazine
- Frequency: Weekly (during festivals)
- Founded: 1996
- Company: UnLimited Media
- Country: United Kingdom
- Based in: London
- Language: English
- Website: www.threeweeks.co.uk

ThreeWeeks is a magazine that covers the Edinburgh Festivals in August.

It has covered the Edinburgh Festival since 1996 . It also covered the Brighton Festival from 2006 to 2010, but withdrew due to lack of financial support.

== Education Programme ==
ThreeWeeks also operates a media education programme for students and young journalists. These students form the magazine's review team.

This team reviewed approximately 1600 shows at the Edinburgh Festival in 2012 and 1,371 in 2013. At that time ThreeWeeks was the second largest reviewer at the Edinburgh Fringe after Broadway Baby but a reduction in its coverage meant that by 2017 it was only the 7th largest.

== Media ==
In Brighton ThreeWeeks published a preview magazine, a daily column in local newspaper The Argus, a daily email newsletter and other online coverage.

In Edinburgh ThreeWeeks publishes a preview magazine, a weekly magazine, a daily email newsletter and other online coverage. It also used to publish a daily printed reviews sheet.

== Awards ==
In Edinburgh it also stages an annual awards event called the ThreeWeeks Editors' Awards.
