= The Pleasance =

Theatre and recreation complex

Coordinates: 55°56′51.33″N 3°10′55.23″W

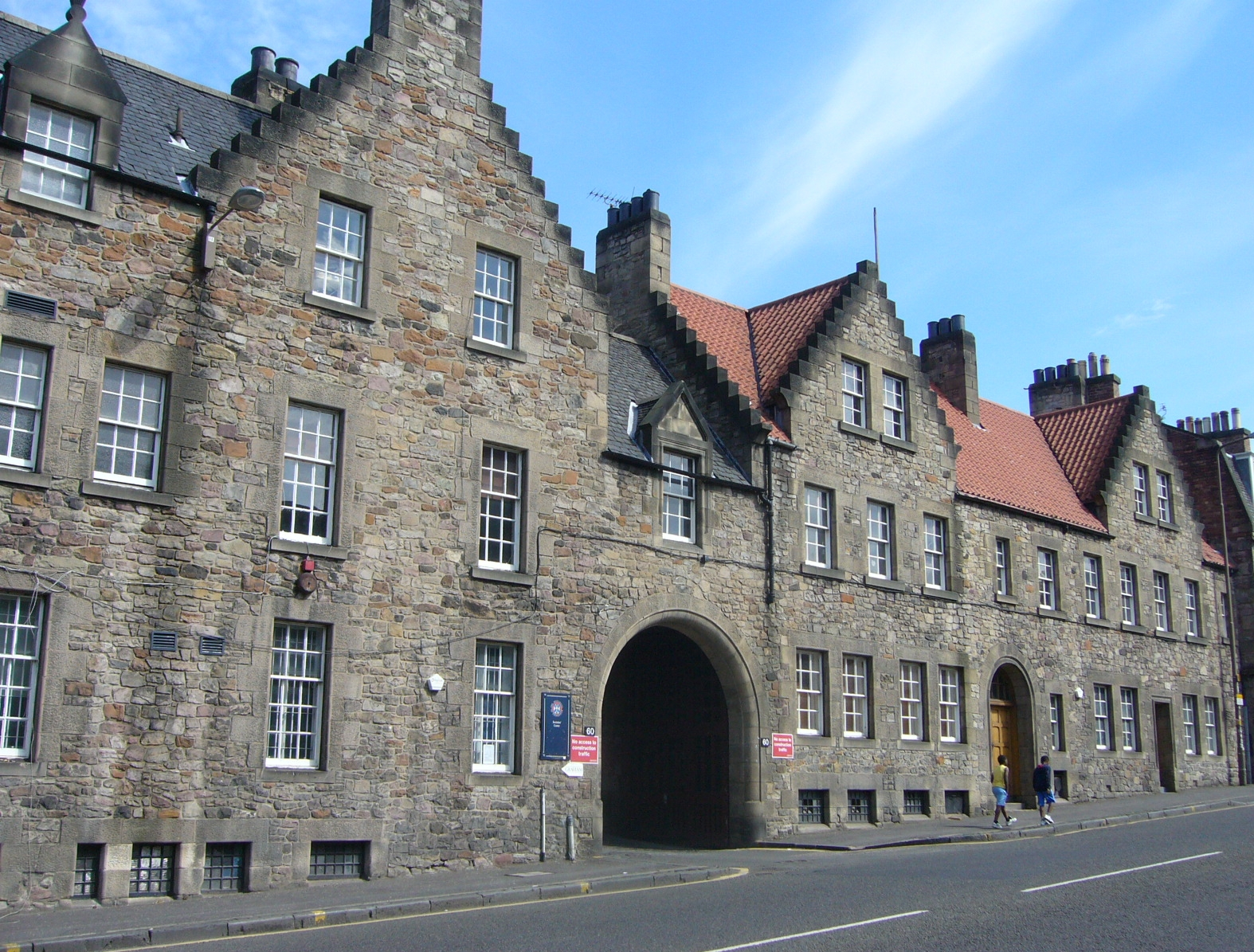
Student Union buildings

The Pleasance is a theatre, bar, sports and recreation complex in Edinburgh, Scotland, situated on a street of the same name. It is owned by the University of Edinburgh, and for nine months of the year it serves the Edinburgh University Students' Association as a societies centre, sports complex, student union bar and entertainment venue.

Every August, it is converted into one of the main venues for the Edinburgh Festival Fringe. The Pleasance Theatre Trust operate the venue during this time, and in this guise the complex is sometimes referred to as Pleasance Edinburgh to distinguish it from a sister venue, also called The Pleasance, that the trust opened in Islington in London in 1995.

== Facilities ==
The Pleasance complex consists of a number of separate buildings, with the main block situated around a central, cobbled courtyard.

The main block houses two bars, The Pleasance Bar and The Cabaret Bar, situated in adjoining rooms with a removable partition in-between. Upstairs from these, also in the main block, is the main Pleasance Theatre. Unlike other university buildings, all these spaces are open to the public year-round, without the need for student identification. The Cabaret Bar and Theatre host a programme of live events throughout the year, including the Pleasance Sessions music festival and regular live music, comedy, spoken word and poetry nights. It is also home to Edinburgh Folk Club.

The rest of the complex contains rooms and meeting spaces which can be booked out for society use. In a building towards the rear of the plot is the Pleasance sports centre and gym.

=== Edinburgh Festival Fringe ===
Every August, the whole complex is converted into a variety of performance spaces under the aegis of The Pleasance Theatre Trust. The main theatre, capacity 299, and renamed Pleasance One for the duration of the Fringe, is one of these. The Cabaret Bar (capacity 170) is another. Other spaces range in size from the 750-seat Pleasance Grand (in the sports centre) to the 46-capacity Cellar. For the purposes of the Fringe brochure, all these spaces are collectively called Pleasance Courtyard, and listed as venue 33.

As one of the "Big Four" venues, programming at the Pleasance is perceived to be of a high standard, featuring nationally recognised acts, with a tendency towards comedy and cabaret. The courtyard becomes "the biggest beer garden in the city" for the month of August.

Although 2024 marks the Pleasance Theatre Trust's "40th Fringe programme", the venue's historic connection with the Edinburgh Festival Fringe goes right back to the beginning, with the venue hosting two of the eight productions which made up the inaugural Edinburgh Festival Fringe 1947.

During August, the Pleasance Theatre Trust also operates out of Potterrow, an entirely separate student union building closer to the university's main Southside sites, and the Edinburgh International Conference Centre. To avoid confusion, these are branded as "Pleasance Dome" and "Pleasance at EICC" during the Fringe, and have distinct venue numbers 23 and 150 respectively.
