= Assembly Rooms (Edinburgh) =

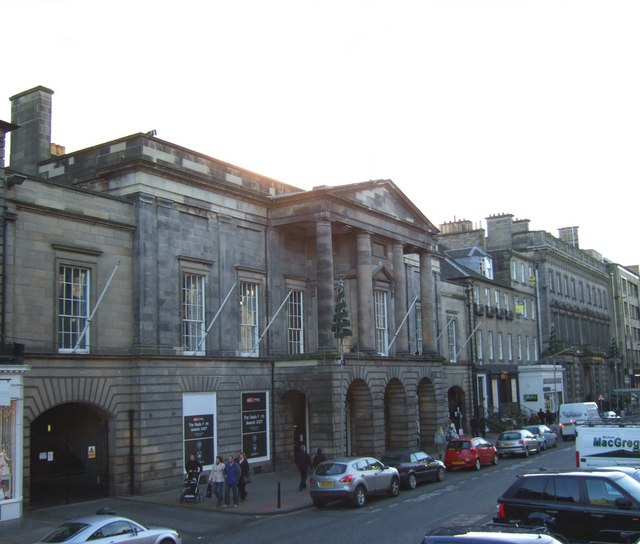

- Location in central Edinburgh
- Address: 54 George Street
- Location: Edinburgh, Scotland
- Coordinates: 55.9530°N 3.1991°W
- Owner: Edinburgh City Council
- Operator: Assembly (Fringe)
- Capacity: Music Hall: 788; Ballroom: 400
- Type: meeting halls
- Public transit: St_Andrew_Square, Princes Street, Edinburgh Waverley

Construction
- Opened: 11 January 1787
- Renovated: 1818, 1907, 2011-2012
- Architect: John Henderson

Website
- www.assemblyroomsedinburgh.co.uk

Listed Building – Category A
- Designated: 13 January 1966
- Reference no.: LB27567

The Assembly Rooms are meeting halls in central Edinburgh, Scotland. Originally solely a meeting place for social gatherings, it is now also used as an arts venue and for public events, including the Edinburgh Festival Fringe and the Hogmanay celebrations. There are four rooms: Music Hall, Ballroom, Supper Room and Edinburgh Suite which are used year-round and are available for private functions.

The total meeting space, as remodelled in 2012, covers 4,600 m^{2} (50,000 sq ft). The building is protected as a category A listed building as "an outstanding example of the late 18th century public building, continuing its original use".

== History ==
The Assembly Rooms opened on 11 January 1787 for the Caledonian Hunt Ball. The building was funded by public subscription, costing over £6,000. The prominent site at the centre of George Street, in the centre of the recently established New Town, was donated by the town council.

The Assembly Rooms was designed by John Henderson, who was selected as architect having won a competition in 1781 for the design of the new Assembly Rooms. The original design went through three revisions before construction eventually began in 1783. Henderson died on 16 February 1786, before the building was completed.

In August 1822, a Peers Ball was held in the Assembly Rooms on the occasion of a visit by King George IV to Edinburgh.

The building was extended several times during the nineteenth century. In 1818, 22 years since the opening of the Assembly Rooms, the grand portico was added by architect William Burn. Burn and his partner David Bryce went on to design the Music Hall in 1843.

Finally, in 1907, new side wings were completed to designs by Robert Rowand Anderson and Balfour Paul. The extension also saw the inclusion of a new Supper Room, relocating the kitchen to the newly established eastern wing.

In 1945 The Assembly Rooms were sold to the Edinburgh Corporation. The Local Government (Scotland) Act 1973 put Edinburgh under the control of a City Council who took ownership of The Assembly Rooms, with whom they have remained ever since.

== Refurbishment ==
In 2011, a £9.3M refurbishment project began, resulting in modernised spaces that retain the Assembly Rooms' original character.

Funding for the project came from Edinburgh Council, with additional contributions from the Heritage Lottery Fund, Historic Scotland, the Scottish Government and Creative Scotland. The renovation was managed by LDN Architects while construction was managed by Balfour Beatty.

== Current use ==
The Assembly Rooms in Edinburgh is a multi-purpose event space, regularly hosting conferences, dinners, performances, exhibitions and weddings.

The venue has two major event spaces, The Ballroom and the Music Hall, and another nine drawing rooms. The venue is decorated throughout with crystal chandeliers, gold leaf and gilt mirrors while also incorporating modern technology.

Room Details
Room	Max capacity	Area
Music Hall	788	481m²
Ball Room	400	342m²

== Edinburgh Festival Fringe ==
Every year the Assembly Rooms are used as one of the venues for the Edinburgh Festival Fringe. The Assembly Rooms were originally operated by the Assembly Festival group, who took their name from the building. Assembly grew from that base to operate from venues such as Assembly Hall, an 840-seat theatre on the Mound (the largest and oldest operating Fringe venue) that was formerly the home of the Scottish Parliament. and buildings around George Square.

For a short while, Assembly (the company) lost the contract to operate the building during the Fringe to Salt 'n' Sauce Promotions, operators of The Stand Comedy Club. However, from 2016, the contract returned to them.
