= Ada F. Kay =

English writer (1929–2024)

- Born: 5 March 1929; Tottington, Greater Manchester, England
- Died: 13 June 2024 (aged 95); Edinburgh, Scotland
- Occupation: dramatist
- Writing career
- Pen name: A.J. Stewart
- Language: English
- Notable work: The Man from Thermopylae (1957)

Ada F. Kay, also known as A.J. Stewart, (5 March 1929 – 13 June 2024) was a writer with a complex personal history. She grew up in Lancashire but lived much of her adult life in Scotland.

== Life and work ==
In her earlier life, Kay had a successful career working as a dramatist in London for BBC, appearing in television mini-series throughout the 1950s. She won praise for her television adaptations of Charlotte Brontë's Villette (1957) and Naomi Mitchison's Spindrift (1959), and for her plays for the BBC Television Playwright series, Red Rose for Ransom (1958) and No Through Line (1959).

Her The Man From Thermopylae, about a sole surviving Spartan from the famous battle in 480 BC, also received critical acclaim. It was first broadcast as a radio play on the BBC Home Service on 11 April 1957, then staged in Germany in 1959, before being produced by Edinburgh's Gateway Theatre Company during its 1961-62 season and again in its final season in 1965.

In the 1960s, after a failed marriage, Kay was planning to write a play about the life of King James IV of Scotland. In the course of her research, she planned to visit the site of the Battle of Flodden where the king was killed in 1513. The night before her visit, she experienced what she believed to be a traumatic flashback of being hacked to death by English spears during the battle, which led her to believe that she was a reincarnation of the king. Purportedly, she had experienced flashbacks of being killed on a battlefield by blades and staves since her early childhood -- the visions she experienced the night before and during her visit of the battlefield, according to her, were continuations of dreams she had always experienced and intuition she had always felt, e.g. she claimed she always felt averted to England.

In 1970 she published Falcon, an "autobiography" of the king under the name of "A.J. Stewart" (a combination of her married name and the king's). Although much of it reflected known historical facts about James IV, it also included some surprising new revelations about the events of the time, e.g. that James III of Scotland was a homosexual, and that James IV had built his warship the Great Michael to sail it up the River Thames and bombard the royal palaces in London.

This account received some attention in Scotland when it was published. Ada Kay appeared on BBC Scotland to discuss her claims: one historian who the BBC asked for his opinion said that the book repeated some popular misconceptions about the reign of James IV. Another historian has commented that "her 'autobiography' of the king is most safely read as a highly colourful and entertaining historical novel". The Scotsman's reviewer concluded that, if it had not been for the bizarre circumstances in which it was written, then it might have gained recognition as a minor addition to the genre pioneered by Robert Graves of works supposedly penned as a first-person account by an actual historical figure, but added that it was at its best where a woman's touch might be strongest. It has also been suggested that it may have been influenced by previously published accounts of the king's life, including Gentle Eagle by Christine Orr, R. L. Mackie's biography, and Walter Scott's Marmion and Tales of a Grandfather.

She later wrote an autobiography of her own 20th-century life, King's Memory (originally published as Died 1513 - Born 1929). It did not receive much attention, and The Scotsman's reviewer concluded that unlike Falcon, there was little there to interest the general reader.

=== Scottish Society of Playwrights ===
Ada Kay was one of the founder members of the Scottish Society of Playwrights, after a meeting called by Hector MacMillan, Ena Lamont Stewart and John Hall in September 1973. She worked with Ian Brown and Hector MacMillan to draft its constitution which was adopted in November 1973.

=== Death ===
Kay died in Edinburgh on 13 June 2024, at the age of 95.
