= Edinburgh Festival Fringe 1948 =

The 1948 Edinburgh Festival Fringe was the second edition of what would become the world's largest arts festival, the Edinburgh Festival Fringe. It was in this year the word "Fringe" is commonly accepted as having first been associated with the event, after it was used by an Edinburgh Evening News critic. The term would come to define the event, and spawn the genre of fringe theatre. It was, however, still several years before it became common parlance in connection with the event or theatre in general, and also some time before any formal organisation of the event took place.

== Background ==
The previous year, eight theatre companies had performed, uninvited, in Edinburgh during the "official" Edinburgh International Festival in August, which had been set up to help the reconciliation and rebuilding process in Europe after the Second World War. They had not had the explicit intention of establishing an actual unofficial event of their own, merely they sought to take advantage of the presence of audiences to showcase their own works, or, in certain cases, such as that of Glasgow Unity Theatre, perhaps make a statement about the elitism of the official festival. They referred to themselves as the "Festival Adjuncts" or elsewhere as the "Semi Official Festival".

Shows had received good reviews and been well-attended, which was a factor in groups returning to do likewise in 1948.

== Participants ==
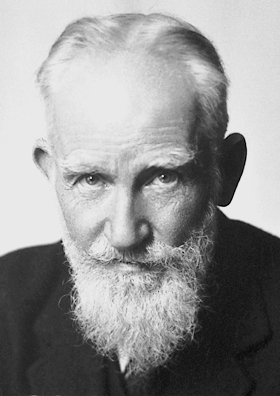
George Bernard Shaw, author of one of the plays performed at the 1948 Fringe

The participants remained broadly the same. Returning groups included local group the Christine Orr Players, Glasgow Unity Theatre, and the Pilgrim Players from England. However, there were also new companies taking part, including the Glyndebourne Children's Theatre.

== Programme ==
A similar set of venues was used for the 1948 event as had been used in 1947. The YMCA on South St Andrew Street again hosted the Christine Orr Players, while the Gateway Theatre also housed productions. A list (incomplete) of participating productions includes:

- Glyndebourne Children's Theatre - Androcles and the Lion by George Bernard Shaw - at the Gateway Theatre, Leith Walk
- Pilgrim Players - The Firstborn by Christopher Fry - at the Gateway Theatre, Leith Walk
- The Makars - It Depends What You Mean - at the Cygnet Theatre
- Christine Orr Players (Edinburgh) - The Lady and The Pedlar by Robin Stark - at the YMCA, South St Andrew Street
- Glasgow Unity Theatre - The Flooers o' Edinburgh by Robert MacLellan - in Princes Street Gardens

== Reception ==
The most historically significant press notice that the event attracted was that of playwright and journalist Robert Kemp in the Edinburgh Evening News on 14 August 1948:

'Round the fringe of official Festival drama, there seems to be more private enterprise than before ... I am afraid some of us are not going to be at home during the evenings!'

This is considered to be the origin of the phrase "fringe" to describe the event, and, by extension, fringe theatre in general.

== Bibliography ==
- Fisher, Mark (2012). The Edinburgh Fringe Survival Guide: How To Make Your Show A Success. London: Methuen. ISBN 978 1 408 13252 4.
- Moffatt, Alistair (1978). The Edinburgh Fringe. London: Johnston and Bacon. ISBN 0 7179 4245 7.
