= Kilkerran Castle =

Coordinates: 55°25′1″N 5°35′23″W

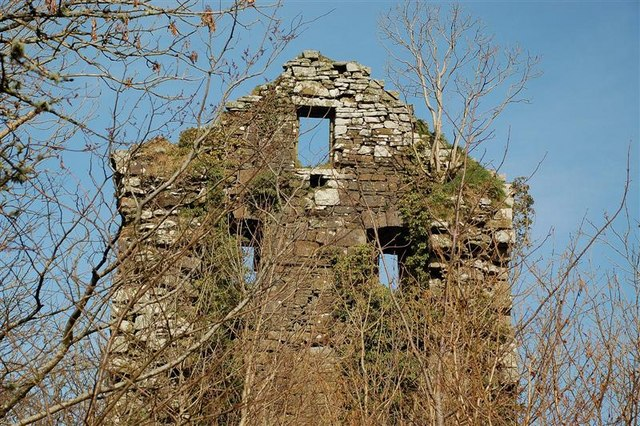
- Top Of Kilkerran Castle
- Interactive map of the Kilkerran Castle area

General information
- Location: Argyll and Bute, Campbeltown, Scotland
- Completed: 1490

Kilkerran Castle is a ruined castle, near Campbeltown, Kintyre, Argyll and Bute, Scotland.

== History ==
A keep was built in 1490 by King James IV, for the housing of a garrison to subdue the MacDonalds.

Further fortification works were undertaken by King James V, during an expedition to the Isles in 1536 against the Macdonalds and other turbulent clans.

As King James V sailed from Kilkerran (now Campbeltown), Alexander MacDonald, 5th of Dunnyveg took Kilkerran Castle by force and hung the governor from its walls in view of King James V. As a result, Alexander MacDonald was summoned to Stirling and died there in 1538.
