= Edinburgh Festival Fringe 1947 =

Arts Festival in Scotland

The 1947 Edinburgh Festival Fringe was the first edition of what would become the world's largest arts festival, the Edinburgh Festival Fringe (although at the time the event was not known by that name).

== Background ==
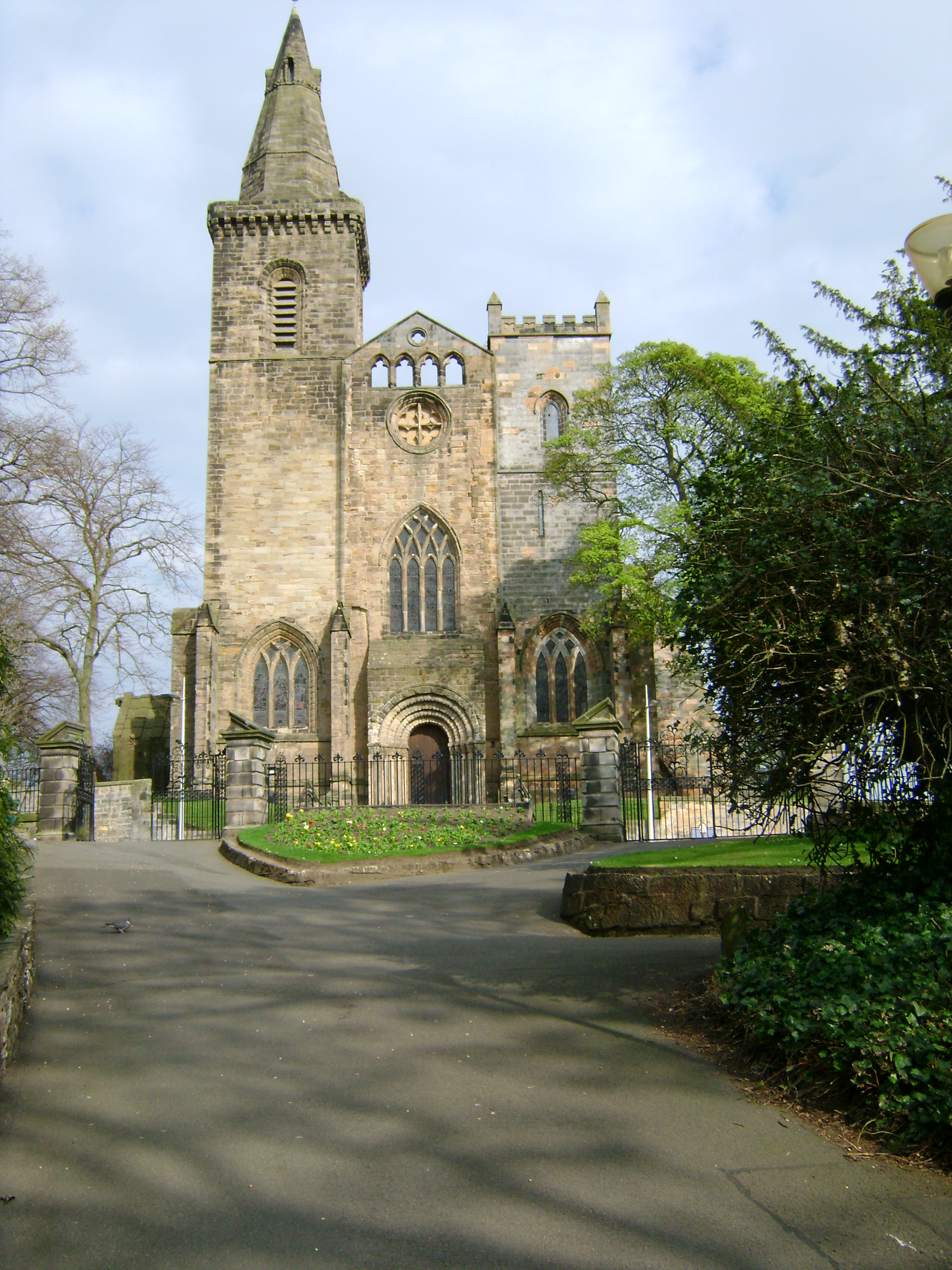
Dunfermline Abbey, venue for the play Everyman at the first Edinburgh Festival Fringe

In 1947, in a gesture of reconciliation and co-operation after the end of the Second World War in Europe, it was decided to create an international festival of the arts in Edinburgh - the Edinburgh International Festival. Under the leadership of artistic director, Rudolf Bing, companies including Glyndebourne Opera, the Halle Orchestra and Sadler's Wells Ballet were invited to perform.

However, post-war Scotland had its own thriving community and touring drama scene, with groups who although poorly funded, were enthusiastic and of a good standard. Several of these took it upon themselves to perform in Edinburgh at the same time that the International Festival was taking place.

In total, eight theatre companies (not all Scottish) who had not been invited by Bing decided to perform anyway, holding their own events in venues not used by the International Festival, plus Dunfermline Abbey, across the River Forth to the north of Edinburgh. It is unlikely these groups had any idea of establishing an actual unofficial event of their own, nor is it likely they contacted each other in advance.

At the time, the groups referred to themselves as the "Festival Adjuncts" and it was not until the following year that Robert Kemp, a Scottish playwright and journalist, is considered to have coined the phrase "fringe" to describe the event. However, the word "fringe" was used at least once in conjunction with the 1947 event when one critic remarked about the Dunfermline Abbey show that it was a shame it was so far out "on the fringe of the Festival".

== Participants ==
The participating groups consisted of six companies from Scotland and two from England. This balance reflected the strength of amateur drama in Scotland at the time. Indeed, it is said there was a post-War "missionary zeal" in the air among amateur companies, and this zeal fuelled the early growth of what would become known as Fringe theatre.

It is certainly possible that there was a political or protest element behind some of the companies' presence. Glasgow Unity Theatre in particular had left wing political inclinations, and viewed the official festival as bourgeois and removed from the mass public, something they aimed to rectify. Their two shows - Gorky's The Lower Depths, and Robert MacLellan's The Laird o' Torwatletie were aimed at the working class. Gorky's The Lower Depths had not been staged in Britain since 1912, so drew attention for that reason. Unity Theatre were among the critics who contested the lack of Scottish performers in the International Festival. In response, The Lower Depths was performed in Scots.

== Programme ==
The full programme of events included Shakespeare, T.S. Eliot, the medieval morality play Everyman, and a play about notorious Edinburgh criminals Burke and Hare, The Anatomist. The festival opened on 24 August 1947.

- Christine Orr Players (Edinburgh) - Macbeth by Shakespeare - at the YMCA, South St Andrew Street
- Edinburgh College of Art Theatre Group - Easter by August Strindberg - at the YMCA, South St Andrew Street
- Edinburgh District, Scottish Community Drama Association - The Anatomist by James Bridie - at The Pleasance Little Theatre
- Edinburgh Peoples’ Theatre - Thunder Rock by Robert Ardrey - at The Pleasance Little Theatre
- Glasgow Unity Theatre - The Lower Depths by Maxim Gorky / The Laird O’ Torwatletie by Robert MacLellan - at The Pleasance Little Theatre
- Manchester Marionette Theatre - a series of short puppet plays - at the New Victoria Cinema, Clerk Street
- Pilgrim Players - The Family Reunion / Murder in the Cathedral by T.S. Eliot - at the Gateway Theatre, Leith Walk
- Production sponsored by the Carnegie Trust - Everyman - at Dunfermline AbbeyAttendances were generally good, and several shows were the subject of positive reviews, especially Everyman in Dunfermline, thereby increasing the likelihood of a repeat "unofficial" festival the following year.

In addition to theatre performances, a series of exhibitions were held as the "offshoots" of the International Festival. They were not officially part of the festival but were advertised alongside it.

- The Art of Stained Glass at St Cuthbert's Church
- Enterprise Scotland exhibition at the Royal Scottish Museum
- Exhibition of Scottish Publishing by Elliot’s Bookshop.

== Bibliography ==
- Dale, Michael (1988). Sore Throats and Overdrafts: An illustrated story of the Edinburgh Festival Fringe. Edinburgh: Precedent Publications. ISBN 0-9512-6502-4.
- Fisher, Mark (2012). The Edinburgh Fringe Survival Guide: How To Make Your Show A Success. London: Methuen. ISBN 978-1-408-13252-4.
- Moffatt, Alistair (1978). The Edinburgh Fringe. London: Johnston and Bacon. ISBN 0-7179-4245-7.
