= Men Should Weep =

Play by Ena Lamont Stewart

Men Should Weep (originally called Quancos Should Dance) is a play by Ena Lamont Stewart, first staged in 1947. It is set in Glasgow during the 1930s Depression, with all the action taking place in the household of the Morrison family. It is a typical example of Scottish contemporary theatre; some Scottish school students learn the play for their Higher (Scottish) drama and English literature course.

== History ==
Men Should Weep was written for the Glasgow Unity Theatre and first produced in January 1947, but only received great acclaim when revived in 1982 by 7:84 Company Scotland. An initial draft of the play was much darker, but it was rewritten as the relatively lighthearted version seen today. Playwright Edward Boyd, who played '1st removal man' in the 1947 premiere, commented in The Scotsman in 1983 that: "On the first night of its revival, a group of us, all survivors from the original Unity Theatre production, met in the bar at the interval, looked at each other, and shook our heads sadly. To begin with, the play had been bowdlerised, not by 7:84 but by the author in an understandable attempt to have the play produced during the years when she and her work were in the wilderness. The original play was harsh, uncompromising and tragic ... Grafting on a happy ending turned it into a piece of shadow boxing."

== Key themes ==
The play deals with many issues, each stemming from a central theme of poverty. Male and female roles in society are tackled through the characters of Maggie, a housewife, and John Morrison, who is unemployed (also the overpowering Isa and feminist Lily); the resilience of youth is displayed in the younger children, Edie and Ernest, who cope very well with the conditions; corruption is explored through Alec; the importance of community is apparent through the neighbours, Mrs Wilson, Mrs Bone and Mrs Harris, and overall interactions in the play, and Jenny Morrison shows growth and the gain of independence. All of these are catalysed somewhat by the overwhelming poverty of the depression.

== Plot summary ==
=== Act 1 ===
==== Scene 1 ====
The play is set on a winter evening in the 1930s in the kitchen of the Morrisons' home in the East End of Glasgow. The play opens on a disordered tenement household where six of the seven children, two parents and Granny of the Morrison family live. The chaos of family life, held together by Maggie, is depicted, but the overall tone is lighthearted, and the audience can see that the family is a happy one. At one point, Edie runs to the toilet and doesn't return until Act Three, as she has blocked the toilet and lost the key. The tone begins to darken with the mention of the troublesome son, Alec, and his wife, Isa, whose home has collapsed.

==== Scene 2 ====
Alec and Isa arrive drunk at the Morrison household, and conflicts escalate between John and his son. As the drunken pair go to bed, John and Maggie discuss children. John realises Jenny isn't home and gets quite angry. Soon, he hears her in the close with a man, and an argument ensues as he drags her in. Jenny is becoming more independent, but John is uncomfortable with this and her growing sexuality. Jenny, fed up with the family's conditions, speaks of plans to leave. John then hits Jenny across the face, causing immediate chaos. Once the house calms down, she leaves the scene, and Maggie fails to get John to come to bed.

=== Act 2 ===
==== Scene 1 ====
The scene opens a week later, with Granny being sent away to live with John's sister-in-law Lizzie, who is portrayed as a hard-hearted character greedy for Granny's pension. After the removal, men take Granny's bed, Maggie arrives, grief-stricken, as Bertie has been kept in hospital because of Tuberculosis. Everybody sympathizes, even Lizzie. In the midst of this, Jenny packs her bags and leaves, as John arrives. The scene ends with John starting to crack as he talks about poverty.

==== Scene 2 ====
The scene opens a month later with Alec and Isa (still living in the Morrison household) arguing. Isa threatens to leave Alec for another man named Peter Robb. At this point, Alec strangles her, but quickly releases his hold in a panic. The argument concludes with Isa storming into the bedroom. A tired Maggie then arrives on the scene, complaining that no one does anything around the house, but also does her best to comfort Alec, who does his best to abuse this care. John arrives in the middle of a conflict between Isa and Maggie and, crucially, takes Isa's side rather than his wife's. Maggie leaves in a rage, and Isa flirts with John. The children enter, and Maggie returns with some chips. At the sight of Ernest's scuffed boots, Maggie cracks, flying into a rage at the rest of the family. The scene calms down and concludes with Maggie's speech.

=== Act 3 ===
The scene opens in a contrastingly cheery Morrison household prepared for Christmas. There is a wireless and the children have presents. Granny is back. John arrives with a red hat, reminiscent of courting days, for Maggie, who is delighted. However, others criticise the gift, including the arriving neighbours. Lily arrives, shortly followed by Alec, who is looking for Isa. The mood darkens as he disrupts the atmosphere. There are mentions of Jenny, who seems not to be doing too well. Soon after the neighbours leave, there is a time lapse. Isa is now packing her bags to leave (without telling anyone). As she reaches the door, however, she meets Alec, who is hysterical, and, realising her plans, tries to kill her. Isa, however, manipulates Alec and manages to escape with Alec hot on her heels. Maggie and Lily discover the evidence of the struggle, but Lily hides the knife to keep Maggie calm. Jenny returns looking like she's met with success, but tells of how she nearly took her own life. She has returned to try to get the family out of their dreadful living conditions so that Bertie can come home again (with money from a man she is living with). She demands that Maggie see the council for a house. However, John arrives and wants nothing to do with her "whore's winnins." Maggie counters this by bringing up their early relationship to show John's hypocrisy. The scene and play end on an emotional climax, but with a note of hope for the future.
