= Ena Lamont Stewart =

Scottish playwright (1912–2006)

Ena Lamont Stewart (10 February 1912, Glasgow – 9 February 2006, Dalmellington) was a Scottish playwright.

== Life and career ==
Stewart was the daughter of a Church of Scotland minister whose family was originally from Canada and had settled in Glasgow.

She married the Scottish actor Jack Stewart and had a son, William. The couple both joined Glasgow's MSU Repertory Theatre in Rutherglen.

She was disturbed by the poverty in the Gorbals, and by the sight of "shawly women". Furthermore, she became a receptionist at the Sick Children's Hospital and witnessed malnutrition and other diseases.

She later worked as the librarian of Baillie's Reference Library.

Stewart was, with Joan Ure and Ada F Kay, a founder member of the Scottish Society of Playwrights, having called with Hector MacMillan and John Hall the meeting which decided to establish the Society in September 1973, and the Scottish League of Dramatists.

== Plays ==
Stewart's first play was Distinguished Company. Her second play was Starched Aprons, about the everyday trials of hospital life.

She wrote Men Should Weep in two days. Both plays were commercial successes. However, her subsequent plays were turned down for production.

Men Should Weep was a major theatrical landmark for the representation of Scottish, class and gender issues. Glasgow Unity Theatre first performed the play at the Athenaeum Theatre, Glasgow, on 30 January 1947. After the company closed in 1951, the play fell into obscurity. Stewart revised her play in the 1970s, and it was revived for the 1982 Clydebuilt Season. The play saw the light of day again in 2005 when it was rated one of the top 50 plays of the last century.

== Other plays ==
- The Heir to Ardmally, 1950s (Pitlochry festival theatre)
- Walkies Time for a Black Poodle
- Knocking on the Wall – Edinburgh festival

== Acclaim ==
In autumn 1998, theatre professionals were asked to nominate ten English language 20th century plays. 100 plays were selected, among them Ena Lamont Stewart's "Men Should Weep", representing the year 1947.

== See also ==
Bet Low, Scottish artist and set designer

== Sources ==
- The Guardian, 27 August 2005: Revolt of the Washerwomen
- Cambridge Histories Online: Cast Study: Ena Lamont Stewart's Men Should Weep, 1947
