= Scottish Society of Playwrights =

Scottish trade union

- Scottish Society of Playwrights
- Founded: 1973
- Headquarters: Glasgow
- Location: Scotland
- Key people: Kris Haddow, Chair Alan McKendrick, Treasurer; Linda Duncan McLaughlin, Secretary
- Affiliations: STUC
- Website: Scottish Society of Playwrights

The Scottish Society of Playwrights (SSP) is a professional members' organisation representing theatre playwrights in Scotland. It is affiliated to the Scottish Trades Union Congress, and party to the Theatrical Management Association playwright's agreement.

== History ==
The Scottish Society of Playwrights was founded at a meeting of Scotland's playwrights held in the Netherbow Theatre in September 1973, at the instigation of Hector MacMillan, Ena Lamont Stewart, and John Hall. It was established in response to a need for a co-ordinated voice for playwrights to be heard in Scottish theatre and to act as a playwriting development and promotional agency. It was formally established, after its constitution was drafted by Ian Brown, its first chair, Hector MacMillan and Ada F Kay in November 1973.

In the first twelve years of its existence the SSP received funding from the Scottish Arts Council. This meant that, besides such tasks as negotiating the first national contract for playwrights with the Federation of Scottish Theatre and representing playwrights in dispute with theatre managements, the Society was able to act as a major development agency for playwrights.

During this period, based on the work of the US National Playwrights' Conference at the Eugene O'Neill Center, it developed the model of playwrights' workshops that is now recognised and used throughout the UK by such institutions as North West Playwrights Workshop and the Performing Arts Lab. It also published important, but neglected, texts, offered members at-cost copying and published a Newsletter which developed in time into Scottish Theatre News. It appointed administrators, firstly Linda Haase and later Charles Hart, who provided outstanding service, Linda Haase going on to help found the Tron Theatre and Charles Hart to be New Writing Officer of the Arts Council in England.

In the mid-eighties, the Scottish Arts Council rethought its funding priorities and decided to withdraw funding from what it called 'support services' in favour of 'direct provision'. It was impervious to the fact that support for playwrights through the SSP was in fact direct provision.

In 1985, the SSP had to close down its lively and wide-ranging workshop, publishing and copying activities and concentrate on its primary role representing the playwrights of Scotland.

In 1986, with the Writers Guild and Theatre Writers Union, it negotiated its agreement with the Theatrical Management Association for the benefit of Scottish playwrights presenting work in England and Wales. Since then, it has represented the interests of playwrights throughout Scotland and abroad, leading a successful playwrights' strike in the early nineties and yet maintaining positive relations with theatre management organisations, north and south of the Border. The SSP continues to be more than simply a negotiating body. In recent years, it has, for example, held a conference in Inverness for northern based playwrights (1999) and produced the first authoritative directory of Scottish playwrights (2001).

== Presidents of the Scottish Society of Playwrights ==
Liz Lochead has been Honorary President of the Scottish Society of Playwrights since 2019.

It is a lifetime appointment, and has previously been held by only three other playwrights:

1. Robert McLellan
2. Ena Lamont Stewart
3. Hector MacMillan
