= Glasgow Unity Theatre =

The Glasgow Unity Theatre was a theatre group that was formed in 1941, in Glasgow. The Unity theatre movement developed from workers' drama groups in the 1930s, seeing itself as using theatre to highlight the issues of the working class being produced by and for working-class audiences. Its demands were "for new Scots plays by new Scottish writers to be performed by native actors." The movement had strong links with the Communist Party of Great Britain and the Left Book Club Theatre Guild.

The theatre in Glasgow was formed as an amalgamation of the Workers' Theatre Group, the Clarion Players, the Transport Players and the Glasgow Jewish Institute players. In its early policy, the company operated in two sections: an outside show group performed revues, masques and sketches to audiences such as those of troops, hospitals and trades unions, while another group concentrated on the full-length play, this wing largely predominating in Unity's subsequent development. The company toured in a converted truck, performing in halls and theatres.

In the Summer of 1946, the company presented Robert McLeish's The Gorbals Story at the Queen's Theatre, Gallowgate. At the time, the play's producer, Robert Mitchell, described Unity's struggle for a new Scottish drama:

What we try to create is something which is essentially reflecting the lives of the ordinary people of Scotland.

During the next three years, The Gorbals Story achieved unparalleled critical and popular success. It was performed over six hundred times in towns and villages in Scotland and England. It was seen by over one hundred thousand people in the first six months alone. The high point of its success came with its appearance at the Garrick Theatre in London in 1948, where circles and stalls alike cost 15/6d (15 shillings and sixpence), which contrasted sharply with Unity's own prices in Glasgow which did not rise 4/6d (4 shillings and sixpence) and began at 1/- (one shilling).

The Gorbals Story was not only successful financially but it was also a highly important play, which strongly influenced the development of Scottish theatre. It brought the Glasgow working-class vividly to the centre of the stage, and intervened directly into the contemporary problem of homelessness (squatters' leader, P.C.B. McIntyre was allowed on stage prior to the rise of the curtain to address an audience which contained both the Glasgow Lord Provost and other civic and literary dignitaries in the stalls, and fellow squatters in the circle).Although only an amateur production, it was later made into a film and released by New World Pictures in 1950.

The company also contributed to the creation of the Edinburgh Festival Fringe, which would become the world's largest arts festival. It was one of eight companies which performed, uninvited, in Edinburgh in August 1947, alongside the newly established Edinburgh International Festival. These unofficial performances are now commonly accepted as the first Edinburgh Festival Fringe, although it wasn't referred to by that name until several years later.

Among the shows the company performed in its first year were The Lower Depths by Maxim Gorky and The Laird o’ Torwatletie by Robert McLellan, both at The Pleasance Little Theatre. The following year, it staged another McLellan play - The Flooers o' Edinburgh - this time in Princes Street Gardens, as a way of reaching more people.

Given the company's political leanings, it is likely their presence in Edinburgh had a political or protest motivation. It is suggested they viewed the official festival as bourgeois and removed from the mass public, something they aimed to rectify through their performances.

Despite these successes, the company folded in 1951 with financial problems arising from an attempt to turn fully professional.

== Productions ==
- Clifford Odets Awake and Sing (in January 1941)
- Maxim Gorky The Lower Depths
- Ena Lamont Stewart Men Should Weep (in June 1948)
- Robert MacLellan The Flooers o' Edinburgh
- Robert MacLellan The Laird O’ Torwatletie
- Roddy McMillan All in Good Faith
- Robert McLeish The Gorbals Story
- George Munro Gold in his Boots
- Benedick Scott The Lambs of God

== Bibliography ==
- Moffatt, Alistair (1978). The Edinburgh Fringe. London: Johnston and Bacon. ISBN 0 7179 4245 7.
- Robert Mitchell (Unity producer), Edinburgh Evening Dispatch, 5 July 1946.
- Forward, 27 September 1947.
- Evening Citizen, 2 April 1948.
