= Christine Orr =

Scottish playwright/actor/director (1988–1963)

Christine Grant Millar Orr
- Born: Christine Grant Millar; 4 August 1899; Edinburgh, Scotland
- Died: 18 May 1963 (aged 63)
- Occupations: Novelist; poet; playwright; theatre director; broadcaster
- Notable work: The Glorious Thing; Kate Curlew: A Romance of the Pentland Country

Christine Grant Millar Orr (1899–1963) was a Scottish novelist, playwright, poet, actor, theatre director and broadcaster. She published eighteen novels over the course of her writing career, although she is best known for her work in broadcasting and in the theatre. Orr was one of the "uninvited eight" instrumental in the founding of the Edinburgh Festival Fringe.

== Life ==
Orr was born in 1899 in Edinburgh, where she spent most of her life. As a child, she studied at St George's School in Edinburgh; she then went on to university at Somerville College, Oxford. She was only nineteen years old when her first novel was published, a WWI homefront novel set in Edinburgh, called The Glorious Thing.

Orr was appointed Organiser of BBC Scotland's Children's Hour in 1936, which was the "most senior post held by a woman in the Regions" during that time. She was only one of three women making a salary over £500 at the BBC before WWII.

In 1944, she married playwright and journalist Robin Stark, although she continued to use her maiden name as her pen name. Together the Starks founded a theatre group called The Unicorn Players, as well as the Princes Theatre in the Edinburgh New Town. Orr then founded the Christine Orr Players, one of eight theatre companies to perform an unofficial event during the first Edinburgh International Festival in 1947, "planting the roots of what would come to be known as the Festival Fringe". The group put on a production of Macbeth, starring Robin Stark, and for which Orr also designed the costumes. The production was called "a great achievement" by the theatre paper The Stage. She also founded The Makars in 1932, which remained "one of Edinburgh's leading amateur groups" for at least two decades.

== Works ==
=== Novels ===
- The Glorious Thing (1919)
- Kate Curlew: A Romance of the Pentland Country (1922)
- The House of Joy: A Novel (1926)
- Hogmanay: A Novel (1928)
- The Marriage of Maida (1928)
- Artificial Silk. A Novel (1929)
- The Price of Love (1929)
- The Gulf Between (1931)
- The Player King: A Romance (1931)
- Immortal Memory. The Comedy of a Reputation (1933)
- Tattered Feather. A Story of These Dangerous Days (1934)
- Hope Takes the High Road (1935)
- The Flying Scotswoman (1936)
- Gentle Eagle: A Stewart Portrait (1937)
- Catriona MacLeod (1937)
- The Happy Woman (1947)
- You Can't Give Them Presents (1949)
- Other People's Houses. A Novel (1951)

=== Poetry ===
- "Until the Day Dawn---" and The Women's Gift. War Poems (1914)
- The Loud Speaker: and Other Poems (1928)

=== Plays ===
- Limericks. A Farcical Comedy (1932)
- No Hawkers. A Farce (1933)
- Clothes do Make a Difference. A Comedy in One Act (1935)
- Miss Scott of Castle Street (1952)
