= The Comedian's Comedian with Stuart Goldsmith =

Interview podcast

- Genre: Comedy

Cast and voices
- Hosted by: Stuart Goldsmith

Publication
- Original release: 2012
- Updates: active

Related
- Website: www.comedianscomedian.com

The Comedian's Comedian with Stuart Goldsmith is an interview podcast, in which Stuart Goldsmith interviews comedians about the craft of writing and performing standup comedy.

Guests on the show have included Russell Brand, Stewart Lee, and Patton Oswalt.

Some episodes have been recorded in the comedians' homes, or—in the case of Paul Sinha—in his car. Other episodes have been recorded live in front of an audience at theatres or festivals. The podcast is published on SoundCloud and iTunes, and syndicated on the British Comedy Guide.

It was nominated at the Chortle Awards for the Internet Award in 2013, 2014, and 2015.

== Episodes ==
No.	Title	Original release date
1	"Rob Deering"	19 March 2012
Recorded live at the Top Secret Comedy Club, Covent Garden
2	"Dan Evans"	11 April 2012
Recorded live at the Top Secret Comedy Club, Covent Garden
3	"Dan Antopolski"	25 April 2012
4	"Ben Norris"	9 May 2012
5	"Paul Sinha"	23 May 2012
Recorded live in Paul's car
6	"Adam Bloom"	5 June 2012
7	"Sarah Millican"	19 June 2012
8	"Arthur Smith"	3 July 2012
9	"Alun Cochrane"	24 July 2012
10	"Liam Mullone"	31 July 2012
11	"Sara Pascoe"	20 September 2012
Recorded live at the Edinburgh Fringe 2012
12	"Noel Britten"	3 October 2012
13	"Fred MacAulay"	10 October 2012
Recorded live at the Edinburgh Fringe 2012
14	"Celia Pacquola"	16 October 2012
15	"Josh Widdicombe"	22 October 2012
Recorded live at the Edinburgh Fringe 2012
16	"Alan Davies"	30 October 2012
Recorded live at the Edinburgh Fringe 2012
17	"Mark Maier"	6 November 2012
18	"The Boy With Tape On His Face"	13 November 2012
Recorded live at the Edinburgh Fringe 2012
19	"Hannibal Buress"	20 November 2012
Recorded live at the Edinburgh Fringe 2012
20	"Eddie Pepitone"	28 November 2012
Recorded live at the Edinburgh Fringe 2012
21	"Mike Gunn"	4 December 2012
22	"Abandoman"	11 December 2012
Recorded live at the Edinburgh Fringe 2012
23	"Dr Brown (Phil Burgers)"	18 December 2012
24	"Pappy's"	9 January 2013
Recorded live at the Edinburgh Fringe 2012
25	"Terry Alderton"	16 January 2013
Recorded live at the Edinburgh Fringe 2012
26	"Stephen Grant"	29 January 2013
27	"Rob Rouse"	5 February 2013
28	"James Acaster"	12 February 2013
Recorded live in London
29	"Rhod Gilbert"	21 February 2013
Recorded live at the Edinburgh Fringe 2012
30	"Jim Jefferies"	28 February 2013
Recorded live at the Edinburgh Fringe 2012
31	"Heath "Chopper" Franklin"	5 March 2013
32	"Carl Donnelly"	12 March 2013
33	"Lindsay Webb"	27 March 2013
34	"Clarke MacFarlane"	2 April 2013
35	"Asher Treleaven"	10 April 2013
36	"David Quirk"	16 April 2013
37	"Geraldine Hickey"	24 April 2013
38	"Tom Allen"	1 May 2013
39	"Felicity Ward"	8 May 2013
40	"Alasdair Tremblay-Birchall"	14 May 2013
41	"Tom Gleeson"	22 May 2013
42	"Tom Binns"	29 May 2013
This episode is no longer available
43	"Benny Boot"	5 June 2013
Recorded live in London
44	"Milo McCabe"	12 June 2013
45	"Jarlath Regan"	24 June 2013
46A	"Richard Herring"	10 July 2013
First of two parts
46B	"Richard Herring"	17 July 2013
Second of two parts
47	"Brendon Burns"	9 August 2013
Recorded live
48	"Marcel Lucont and Alexis Dubus"	1 September 2013
49	"Hal Cruttenden"	12 September 2013
Recorded live
50	"Greg Proops"	18 September 2013
Recorded live
51	"Phil Nichol"	1 October 2013
Recorded live
52	"The Pajama Men"	16 October 2013
Recorded live
53	"Al Murray"	29 October 2013
Recorded live
54	"David Baddiel"	12 November 2013
Recorded live
55	"Milton Jones"	27 November 2013
Recorded live
56	"Andrew Maxwell"	11 December 2013
Recorded live
57	"Jason Manford"	16 December 2013
Recorded live
58	"Sarah Millican Returns"	30 December 2013
Recorded live
59	"Rob Delaney"	8 January 2014
Recorded live
60	"Susan Calman"	15 January 2014
Recorded live
61	"Bo Burnham"	23 January 2014
Recorded live
62	"Norman Lovett"	29 January 2014
Recorded live
63	"Marcus Brigstocke"	6 February 2014
Recorded live
64	"Tony Law"	12 February 2014
Recorded live
65	"Nick Helm"	20 February 2014
Recorded live
66	"Will Franken"	27 February 2014
Recorded live
67	"Gary Delaney"	5 March 2014
Recorded live in Wolverhampton
68	"Sean Hughes"	12 March 2014
Recorded live
69	"Ed Byrne"	19 March 2014
Recorded live
70	"Tim Vine"	25 March 2014
Recorded live
71	"Kerry Godliman"	3 April 2014
Recorded live
72	"David O'Doherty"	9 April 2014
Recorded live
73	"Max & Ivan"	17 April 2014
Recorded live
74	"Claudia O'Doherty"	25 April 2014
Recorded live at the Gilded Balloon
75	"Carey Marx"	30 April 2014
Recorded live at the New Zealand International Comedy Festival
76	"Ben Hurley"	15 May 2014
Recorded at the New Zealand International Comedy Festival
77	"Tom Wrigglesworth"	22 May 2014
Recorded at the New Zealand International Comedy Festival
78	"Michele A'Court"	28 May 2014
Recorded at the New Zealand International Comedy Festival
79	"Luke Heggie"	5 June 2014
Recorded at the New Zealand International Comedy Festival
80	"Jarred Christmas"	11 June 2014
Recorded at the New Zealand International Comedy Festival
81	"Adrienne Truscott"	19 June 2014
82	"Andy Zaltzman"	25 June 2014
83	"Aamer Rahman"	2 July 2014
84	"Nick Doody"	10 July 2014
85	"Kyle Kinane"	17 July 2014
86	"Noel James"	23 July 2014
87	"John Hastings"	30 July 2014
87A	"Edfringe Mini Ep"	6 August 2014
Recommendations for the Edinburgh Fringe 2014
88	"Sam Simmons"	14 August 2014
Recorded live at Bob and Miss Behave's Bookshop
89	"Phill Jupitus"	27 August 2014
Recorded live at Bob and Miss Behave's Bookshop
90	"Bridget Christie"	5 September 2014
Recorded live at Bob and Miss Behave's Bookshop
91	"Steen Raskopoulos"	10 September 2014
Recorded at the Edinburgh Festival 2014
92	"Josie Long"	17 September 2014
Recorded live at Bob and Miss Behave's Bookshop
93	"Eleanor Tiernan"	26 September 2014
94	"Tom Stade"	2 October 2014
Recorded live at the Arena Theatre, Wolverhampton
95	"Trygve Wakenshaw"	9 October 2014
Recorded at the Edinburgh Festival 2014
96A	"David Cross"	16 October 2014
First of two parts
96B	"David Cross"	23 October 2014
Second of two parts
97	"Prince Abdi"	30 October 2014
98A	"Ross Noble"	6 November 2014
First of two parts
98B	"Ross Noble"	13 November 2014
Second of two parts
99	"Luisa Omielan"	20 November 2014
100	"Phil Kay"	27 November 2014
Recorded live
101	"Nish Kumar"	4 December 2014
102	"David McSavage"	12 December 2014
Recorded live at Trinity College Dublin; This episode is no longer available
103	"Mickey "D" Dwyer"	18 December 2014
104	"Alfie Brown"	8 January 2015
105	"Katy Wix"	15 January 2015
106	"Thom Tuck"	24 January 2015
107	"Urzila Carlson"	29 January 2015
108	"Harley Breen"	6 February 2015
109	"Andrew O'Neill"	13 February 2015
110	"Lou Sanders"	20 February 2015
111	"Brendon Burns"	27 February 2015
112	"Liz Miele"	6 March 2015
113A	"Tim Key"	13 March 2015
First of two parts
113B	"Tim Key"	20 March 2015
Second of two parts
114A	"John Gordillo"	27 March 2015
First of two parts
114B	"John Gordillo"	3 April 2015
Second of two parts
115	"Gina Yashere"	10 April 2015
116	"Des Bishop"	17 April 2015
Recorded live
117	"Nick Mohammed"	24 April 2015
118	"The Midnight Beast"	1 May 2015
119	"Nina Conti"	8 May 2015
Recorded live
120	"Mark Watson"	15 May 2015
Recorded live
121	"Mitch Benn"	22 May 2015
Recorded live
122	"Zoe Lyons"	29 May 2015
123	"Wil Anderson"	5 June 2015
Recorded live
124	"Ian Stone"	12 June 2015
125	"Dara Ó Briain"	19 June 2015
126	"Nazeem Hussain"	26 June 2015
127	"Gavin Webster"	3 July 2015
Recorded live
128	"Daliso Chaponda"	10 July 2015
Recorded live at Darlington Comedy Festival
129	"Adam Buxton"	17 July 2015
Recorded live at Soho Theatre
130	"George Egg"	27 July 2015
131	"Jen Kirkman"	28 July 2015
132	"Moshe Kasher"	29 July 2015
133	"Patton Oswalt"	30 July 2015
Recorded live at Just For Laughs, Montreal
134	"Andy Kindler"	2 August 2015
135	"Charlie Baker"	9 August 2015
Recorded live at Latitude Festival
136	"Justin Moorhouse"	16 August 2015
137	"Katherine Ryan"	24 August 2015
Recorded live at the Edinburgh Fringe
138	"John Lloyd"	4 September 2015
Recorded live at the Edinburgh Fringe
139	"Tommy Tiernan"	12 September 2015
Recorded live at the Edinburgh Fringe
140	"Mae Martin"	18 September 2015
Recorded live at the Edinburgh Fringe
141	"Matt Lucas"	25 September 2015
142	"Joel Dommett"	2 October 2015
Recorded live at the Edinburgh Fringe
143	"Jackie Kashian"	7 October 2015
144A	"Todd Glass"	10 October 2015
First of two parts
144B	"Todd Glass"	12 October 2015
Second of two parts
145A	"Jimmy Pardo"	16 October 2015
First of two parts
145B	"Jimmy Pardo"	20 October 2015
Second of two parts
146	"Dave Anthony"	23 October 2015
147	"Jason Byrne"	4 November 2015
Recorded live at the Edinburgh Fringe
148	"Aisling Bea"	14 November 2015
Recorded live at the Edinburgh Fringe
149	"Will Durst"	21 November 2015
Recorded live at the Edinburgh Fringe
150	"Stewart Francis"	27 November 2015
Recorded live at the Edinburgh Fringe
151	"Ronny Chieng"	10 December 2015
Recorded live at the Edinburgh Fringe
152	"Daniel Sloss"	19 December 2015
Recorded live at the Edinburgh Fringe
153	"Isy Suttie"	8 January 2016
Recorded live at the Soho Theatre
154	"Mark Steel"	16 January 2016
Recorded live at the Edinburgh Fringe
155	"Jena Friedman"	22 January 2016
Recorded live at the Edinburgh Fringe
156	"Matt Kirshen"	4 February 2016
157	"Nathan Caton"	12 February 2016
158	"Hari Kondabolu"	19 February 2016
159	"Spencer Jones"	26 February 2016
Recorded live at Bob Slayer's Blundabus
160	"Gein's Family Giftshop"	7 March 2016
161	"Dave Gorman"	11 March 2016
Recorded live at Soho Theatre
162	"Tania Edwards"	19 March 2016
163	"Mike Wilmot"	26 March 2016
164A	"Jimmy Carr"	4 April 2016
First of two parts
164B	"Jimmy Carr"	11 April 2016
Second of two parts
165	"Romesh Ranganathan"	21 April 2016
Recorded live at Soho Theatre
166	"Abigoliah Schamaun"	4 May 2016
167	"Seymour Mace"	17 May 2016
168	"Joe Lycett"	24 May 2016
Recorded live at Machynlleth Comedy Festival
169	"Liam Williams"	4 June 2016
170	"Russell Howard"	13 June 2016
171	"Shappi Khorsandi"	24 June 2016
172	"Funmbi Omotayo"	4 July 2016
173	"Jinkx Monsoon"	12 July 2016
174	"Wendy Wason"	19 July 2016
175	"Todd Barry"	1 August 2016
176	"Bill Burr"	15 August 2016
177	"Tiff Stevenson"	12 September 2016
Recorded live at Larmer Tree Festival
178	"Lewis Black"	18 September 2016
Recorded live at Just For Laughs, Montreal
179	"Loyiso Gola"	26 September 2016
180	"Tim Minchin"	3 October 2016
Recorded live at the Los Angeles Podcast Festival
181	"John Robins"	10 October 2016
182	"Cameron Esposito"	17 October 2016
183	"Paul Currie"	24 October 2016
184	"Barry Crimmins"	31 October 2016
185	"Jonny & the Baptists - Jonny Donahoe and Paddy Gervers"	7 November 2016
186	"Tony Law Returns"	15 November 2016
187	"Carmen Lynch"	21 November 2016
188	"Andy Askins"	28 November 2016
189	"Chris Gethard"	5 December 2016
190	"Fern Brady"	12 December 2016
191	"Pappy's Return"	19 December 2016
192	"Elis James"	9 January 2017
193	"Angela Barnes"	16 January 2017
194	"Brian Regan"	23 January 2017
195	"Elis James and John Robins"	30 January 2017
Live from the Soho Theatre
196	"Rachel Parris"	7 February 2017
197	"Phil Wang"	13 February 2017
198	"Mark Forward"	20 February 2017
199	"Paul Chowdhry"	27 February 2017
Recorded live at Soho Theatre
200	"Stewart Lee"	6 March 2017
201	"Russell Brand"	14 March 2017
202A	"Melbourne Comedy Festival 2017 Special Post-amble"	5 April 2017
202	"Hannah Gadsby"	11 April 2017
Recorded live at Melbourne Comedy Festival
203	"Aunty Donna"	8 May 2017
204	"Jeremy Hardy"	15 May 2017
Recorded live at Soho Theatre
205	"Rhys Nicholson"	22 May 2017
206	"Lost Voice Guy (AKA Lee Ridley)"	29 May 2017
207	"Tom Ballard"	5 June 2017
208	"Jo Brand"	12 June 2017
Recorded live at Soho Theatre
209	"Ed Gamble"	20 June 2017
Recorded live at Stonefree Festival
210	"Pippa Evans"	27 June 2017
211	"Barry Cryer"	3 July 2017
212	"Orlando Baxter"	10 July 2017
213	"Simon Munnery"	17 July 2017
214	"Nick Cody"	26 July 2017
215	"Ivan Aristeguieta"	31 July 2017
216	"Andy Daly"	7 August 2017
217	"W Kamau Bell"	27 August 2017
Recorded live at Just For Laughs Montreal
218	"Liza Treyger"	4 September 2017
219	"Sugar Sammy"	11 September 2017
220	"Sasheer Zamata"	18 September 2017
221	"Michael Legge"	26 September 2017
Recorded live at Objectively Funny Festival
222	"Joe DeRosa"	3 October 2017
223	"Jo Caulfield"	10 October 2017
224	"Tim McGarry"	16 October 2017
Recorded live at Belfast Comedy Festival
225	"Reginald D Hunter"	23 October 2017
226	"Sean Patton"	30 October 2017
227	"Sarah Kendall"	13 November 2017
228	"Howard Read"	28 November 2017
229	"Zoe Coombs Marr"	4 December 2017
230	"Dane Baptiste"	11 December 2017
231	"Jess Robinson"	19 December 2017
232	"James Acaster Returns"	17 January 2018
part one
232	"James Acaster Returns"	18 January 2018
part two
233	"Jonathan Pie (Tom Walker & Andrew Doyle)"	9 February 2018
234	"Arabella Weir"	18 February 2018
235	"Colin Hoult"	26 February 2018
236	"Julio Torres"	8 March 2018
237	"Ola The Comedian"	14 March 2018
238	"Maeve Higgins"	19 March 2018
Recorded live at SXSW
239	"James Davis"	26 March 2018
Recorded live from SXSW
240	"Andy Nyman"	2 April 2018
241	"Jeremy Dyson (The League of Gentlemen)"	3 April 2018
242	"Maria Bamford"	9 April 2018
243	"Beth Stelling"	16 April 2018
Recorded live from SXSW
244	"Tez Ilyas"	23 April 2018
245	"Ron White"	30 April 2018
Recorded live from SXSW
246	"Anne Edmonds"	14 May 2018
247	"Ben Target"	21 May 2018
248	"Sophie Willan"	28 May 2018
249	"Anuvab Pal"	4 June 2018
250	"Simon Evans"	11 June 2018
251	"Robin Ince"	19 June 2018
252	"John Luke Roberts"	25 June 2018
253	"The Raymond and Mr Timpkins Revue"	3 July 2018
254	"Paul Foot"	9 July 2018
255	"Scummy Mummies"	23 July 2018
256	"Jen Brister"	30 July 2018
Recorded live at Larmer Tree Festival
257	"Myq Kaplan"	13 August 2018
258	"Nick Thune"	21 August 2018
259	"Rose Matafeo"	3 September 2018
260	"Jack Docherty"	10 September 2018
261	"Alex Edelman"	17 September 2018
262	"Alice Fraser"	25 September 2018
Recorded live at The Vintage Mobile Cinema, Edinburgh Fringe
263	"Garrett Millerick"	1 October 2018
Recorded live at the Barn Theatre, Welwyn
264	"Janeane Garofalo"	8 October 2018
265	"Mark Thomas"	15 October 2018
266	"Ismo Leikola"	22 October 2018
267	"Elf Lyons"	5 November 2018
268	"Imran Yusuf"	12 November 2018
269	"Sean Morley"	19 November 2018
270	"No Such Thing as a Fish"	26 November 2018
Recorded live
271	"Laura Lexx"	3 December 2018
272	"John Robertson"	10 December 2018
273	"Laura Davis"	17 December 2018
274	"Phil Ellis"	7 January 2019
This episode is no longer available
275	"Doc Brown"	14 January 2019
276	"Ed Aczel"	21 January 2019
277	"Jessica Fostekew"	28 January 2019
278	"Eggsy (Goldie Lookin Chain) (aka John Rutledge)"	4 February 2019
279	"Police Cops"	11 February 2019
Recorded live at Vault Festival
280	"Jeff Innocent"	18 February 2019
281	"Jake Johannsen"	25 February 2019
282	"Toby Hadoke"	4 March 2019
283	"Ben "Yahtzee" Croshaw"	12 March 2019
284	"Kathy Griffin"	18 March 2019
Recorded live at SXSW
285	"Roy Wood Jr"	26 March 2019
Recorded live at SXSW
286	"Sindhu Vee"	1 April 2019
Recorded live at Podfest Birmingham
287	"Eugene Mirman"	8 April 2019
Recorded live at SXSW
288	"Chris Addison"	16 April 2019
289	"Deborah Frances-White"	22 April 2019
290	"Matt Braunger"	29 April 2019
Recorded live at SXSW, Austin Texas
291	"Bec Hill"	7 May 2019
292	"Josh Widdicombe Returns"	13 May 2019
Live At Machynlleth Comedy Festival
293	"Andi Osho"	22 May 2019
294	"Ahir Shah"	28 May 2019
295	"Russell Hicks"	3 June 2019
296	"Markus Birdman"	11 June 2019
297	"Paul Smith"	18 June 2019
298	"Nick Revell"	25 June 2019
299	"Sam Jay"	1 July 2019
300	"Stuart Goldsmith"	9 July 2019
301	"Simon Brodkin"	17 July 2019
302	"Jayde Adams"	23 July 2019
Recorded live at Southend Comedy Festival
303	"Pete Holmes"	30 July 2019
Recorded live at Just For Laughs Montreal
304	"Vikki Stone"	5 August 2019
305	"Suzi Ruffell"	18 August 2019
306	"Joz Norris"	29 August 2019
Recorded live at Edinburgh Fringe 2019
307	"Rob Auton"	5 September 2019
308	"Ellie Taylor"	10 September 2019
309	"Randy Feltface (Heath McIvor)"	22 September 2019
310	"Sara Barron"	26 September 2019
311	"Sofie Hagen"	3 October 2019
312	""Zach and Viggo" and Jonny Woolley"	10 October 2019
313	"The Kagools"	21 October 2019
314	"Jimeoin"	24 October 2019
315	"Chris Fleming"	31 October 2019
316	"Carl Hutchinson"	8 November 2019
317	"Matt Besser"	14 November 2019
318	"Neil Hamburger (Gregg Turkington)"	28 November 2019
319	"Tim Renkow"	5 December 2019
320	"Flo & Joan"	13 December 2019
321	"Santa Claus (and Herbie Treehead)"	19 December 2019
322	"Tom Basden"	6 January 2020
323	"John Kearns"	16 January 2020
324	"Jamali Maddix"	23 January 2020
325	"Ninia Benjamin"	31 January 2020
326	"The Sklar Brothers"	6 February 2020
327	"Matt Winning"	13 February 2020
328	"Seann Walsh"	20 February 2020
329	"Eshaan Akbar"	28 February 2020
330	"Alexei Sayle"	5 March 2020
331	"Janey Godley"	12 March 2020
332	"Desiree Burch"	20 March 2020
333	"Steve McNeil"	30 March 2020
334	"Robby Collins"	2 April 2020
335	"Scott Bennett"	10 April 2020
336	"Robert Popper"	16 April 2020
337	"Alonzo Bodden"	30 April 2020
338	"Helen Zaltzman"	8 May 2020
339	"Brett Goldstein"	14 May 2020
340	"Pope Lonergan"	21 May 2020
341	"Sindhu Vee Returns"	27 May 2020
342	"Catherine Cohen"	4 June 2020
343	"Nigel Ng"	11 June 2020
344	"Archie Maddocks"	18 June 2020
345	"Larry Dean"	3 September 2020
346	"Gary Gulman"	10 September 2020
347	"Paul Sinha Returns"	17 September 2020
348	"Erin Foley"	24 September 2020
349	"Kim Noble"	1 October 2020
350	"Mat Ewins"	8 October 2020
351	"Laurie Kilmartin"	15 October 2020
352	"Alasdair Beckett-King"	29 October 2020
353	"Colt Cabana"	12 November 2020
354	"Martin Mor"	19 November 2020
355	"James Acaster Returns, Again!"	26 November 2020
First of two parts
356	"James Acaster Returns, Again!"	3 December 2020
Second of two parts
357	"Athena Kugblenu"	10 December 2020
358	"Nigel Ng Returns!"	17 December 2020
359	"Aunty Donna Return!"	24 December 2020
360	"Jordan Brookes"	4 February 2021
361	"Tom Neenan"	11 February 2021
362	"Russell Kane"	18 February 2021
363	"Bethany Black"	26 February 2021
364	"Olga Koch"	5 March 2021
365	"Ramon Rivas II"	11 March 2021
366	"Loyiso Gola Returns"	18 March 2021
367	"Sooz Kempner"	25 March 2021
368	"The Delightful Sausage"	2 April 2021
369	"Catherine Bohart"	9 April 2021
370	"Stuart Laws"	6 May 2021
371	"Ian Moore"	13 May 2021
372	"Rosie Jones"	20 May 2021
373	"Greg Jenner"	27 May 2021
374	"Piff The Magic Dragon (John Van Der Put)"	10 June 2021
375	"Jessie Cave"	18 June 2021
376	"Josh Johnson"	24 June 2021
377	"Paul Zerdin"	1 July 2021
378	"Stevie Martin"	9 July 2021
379	"Fin Taylor"	16 July 2021
380	"CK (Caimh) McDonnell"	24 July 2021
381	"Jonathan Coulton"	24 September 2021
382	"Harriet Kemsley"	30 September 2021
383	"Thanyia Moore"	7 October 2021
384	"Adam Rowe"	14 October 2021
385	"Aaron Chen"	21 October 2021
386	"Pan-Amble: Belonging"	28 October 2021
387	"Pierre Novellie"	4 November 2021
388	"Philippa Perry (NonComPod)"	12 November 2021
389	"Tom Stade Returns"	22 November 2021
390	"Foil Arms and Hog"	25 November 2021
391	"Omid Djalili"	2 December 2021
392	"Jimmy Carr Returns, Live! (Part One)"	13 December 2021
392	"Jimmy Carr Returns, Live! (Part Two)"	17 December 2021
393	"Diane Spencer"	10 February 2022
394	"Cally Beaton"	17 February 2022
395	"Slim"	25 February 2022
396	"K Trevor Wilson"	3 March 2022
397	"Matt Richardson"	11 March 2022
398	"Byron Bowers"	21 March 2022
Recorded live at SXSW
399	"Eddie Pepitone Returns"	24 March 2022
Recorded live at SXSW
400	"10th Birthday Special"	1 April 2022
401	"Dulcé Sloan"	13 May 2022
Recorded live at SXSW
402	"Daniel Rigby"	20 May 2022
403	"Bobby Mair"	27 May 2022
404	"Helen Bauer"	2 June 2022
405	"Olaf Falafel"	11 June 2022
406	"Amy Miller"	17 June 2022
407	"Alison Spittle"	4 July 2022
408	"Ria Lina"	15 July 2022
409	"Seán McLoughlin"	22 July 2022
410	"Tom Ward"	1 August 2022
411	"Jenny Bede"	5 August 2022
412	"Bianca Del Rio"	17 August 2022
413	"Jordan Gray"	30 September 2022
414	"Lauren Pattison"	7 October 2022
415	"Grace Petrie"	14 October 2022
416	"Glenn Moore"	21 October 2022
417	"Esther Manito"	4 November 2022
418	"Sarah Keyworth"	11 November 2022
419	"Kurt Braunohler"	18 November 2022
420	"Vir Das"	10 March 2023
421	"Tom Houghton"	24 March 2023
422	"Godfrey"	31 March 2023
Recorded live at SXSW
423	"Michelle Brasier"	7 April 2023
424	"John Hastings Returns"	14 April 2023
425	"Steve Agee"	21 April 2023
Recorded live at SXSW
426	"Emma Willmann"	28 April 2023
Recorded live at SXSW
427	"Ignacio Lopez"	12 May 2023
428	"James Adomian"	19 May 2023
Recorded live at SXSW
429	"Neil Delamere"	26 May 2023
430	"Lee Kyle"	13 June 2023
431	"Gianmarco Soresi"	23 June 2023
432	"Mike Birbiglia"	14 July 2023
433	"Jonny Pelham"	21 July 2023
434	"Lucy Beaumont"	28 July 2023
435	"Nish Kumar"	31 August 2023
436	"Gareth Reynolds"	8 September 2023
437	"Adam Bloom"	22 September 2023
438	"Ruth Bratt"	29 September 2023
439	"Jeff Shaw"	14 October 2023
440	"Alistair Barrie"	27 October 2023
441	"Sikisa"	10 November 2023
442	"Iliza Shlesinger"	23 November 2023
443	"Harriet Dyer"	15 December 2023
444	"James Acaster Part One"	12 January 2023
444	"James Acaster Part Two"	16 January 2023
445	"Susie McCabe"	25 January 2024
446	"Mawaan Rizwan"	1 February 2024
447	"Tomi Walamies"	9 February 2024
448	"Leo Reich"	22 February 2024
449	"Janine Harouni"	8 March 2024
450	"Dara Ó Briain (Part One)"	15 March 2024
450	"Dara Ó Briain (Part Two)"	21 March 2024
451	"Josh Pugh"	28 March 2024
452	"Martin Urbano"	5 April 2024
453	"Julia Masli"	18 April 2024
454	"Brian Simpson"	26 April 2024
Recorded live at SXSW
455	"Dai Henwood"	3 May 2024
456	"Lynne Koplitz"	17 May 2024
Recorded live at SXSW
457	"Mike Wozniak (Part One)"	24 May 2024
457	"Mike Wozniak (Part Two)"	30 May 2024
458	"Jaboukie Young-White"	7 June 2024
Recorded live at SXSW
459	"Tanyalee Davis"	20 June 2024
460	"Fin Taylor vs The Internet"	28 June 2024
461	"Zach Zucker"	11 July 2024
462	"Rosie Holt"	19 July 2024
463	"Nabil Abdulrashid"	25 July 2024
464	"Georgie Carroll"	9 August 2024
465	"Geoffrey Asmus"	30 August 2024
466	"Viggo Venn (Part One)"	12 September 2024
466	"Viggo Venn (Part Two)"	19 September 2024
467	"Ania Magliano"	11 October 2024
468	"Vittorio Angelone"	24 October 2024
469	"Remembering Dr Janey Godley"	8 November 2024
470	"Lise Mayer"	22 November 2024
471	"Rhys James"	6 December 2024
472	"Milton Jones"	19 December 2024
473	"Max Fosh"	3 January 2025
474	"Russell Howard (Part One)"	10 January 2025
474	"Russell Howard (Part Two)"	15 January 2025
475	"Chloe Petts"	30 January 2025
476	"Mark Simmons"	20 February 2025
477	"Huge Davies"	7 March 2025
478	"Damien Power"	13 March 2025
479	"Iain Stirling"	28 March 2025
480	"Shazia Mirza"	10 April 2025
481	"Pete Lee"	2 May 2025
Recorded live at SXSW
482	"Chloe Radcliffe"	9 May 2025
483	"Scott Aukerman"	23 May 2025
Recorded live at SXSW
484	"Alex Kealy"	6 June 2025
485	"Nick Mohammed (Part One)"	13 June 2025
485	"Nick Mohammed (Part Two)"	19 June 2025
486	"Marc Jennings"	27 June 2025
487	"Daniel Foxx"	11 July 2025
488	"Marjolein Robertson"	25 July 2025
489	"Kemah Bob"	1 August 2025
490	"Abby Wambaugh"	8 August 2025
491	"Aparna Nancherla"	15 August 2025
Recorded live at SXSW
492	"Lucy Pearman"	26 September 2025
493	"Emma Doran"	10 October 2025
494	"Alan Davies"	24 October 2025
495	"Doug Naylor"	13 November 2025
496	"Adam Riches"	20 November 2025
497	"Josie Long"	27 November 2025
498	"Urooj Ashfaq"	12 December 2025
499	"Ray Bradshaw"	18 December 2025
500	"Reggie Watts"	29 January 2026
501	"Sophie Duker"	5 February 2026
502	"Shenoah Allen"	12 February 2026
503	"Lindsey Santoro"	19 February 2026
504	"Ken Cheng"	27 February 2026
505	"Joyelle Nicole Johnson"	12 March 2026
506	"Charlene Kaye"	2 April 2026
507	"Jonno Johnson"	23 April 2026
508	"John Tothill"	30 April 2026
509	"John Robins"	7 May 2026
510	"Ian Smith"	14 May 2026
511	"Sara Pascoe"	4 June 2026
512	"Joe Wells"	18 June 2026
513	"Amy Annette"	25 June 2026
514	"Joe Sutherland"	10 July 2026
515	"Bilal Zafar"	23 July 2026
516	"Kristen Schaal"	31 July 2026
517	"Nish Kumar (Part One)"	7 August 2026
517	"Nish Kumar (Part Two)"	13 August 2026
