= Richard Herring's interview podcasts =

Comedy podcasts

Richard Herring's Leicester Square Theatre Podcast (RHLSTP)
- Language: English

Cast and voices
- Hosted by: Richard Herring

Music
- Ending theme: Pest – Try Again (series 1–20); Scant Regard — Untitled (series 21–)

Technical specifications
- Audio format: MP3

Publication
- Original release: 26 June 2012
- Provider: Go Faster Stripe

Related
- Website: www.rhlstp.co.uk www.comedy.co.uk/

Richard Herring's Leicester Square Theatre Podcast (or RHLSTP (UK: /rəhɛləstʌpə/)) and Richard Herring's Edinburgh Fringe Podcast are two related comedy podcasts, created and hosted by British comedian Richard Herring. Hosted on The British Comedy Guide, the podcasts are chats with notable guests, usually fellow comedians. The original Edinburgh Fringe podcast ran from 2011 to 2013, and took place most days for the duration of the Fringe, focusing on chats with performers at the festival. They also contain short stand-up segments from Fringe performers. The Leicester Square Theatre Podcast, recorded at Leicester Square in London, began in 2012 and follows a similar format, with higher profile guests. It runs for a shorter series than the Edinburgh Fringe version, with weekly recordings.

Both podcasts are performed in front of a paying audience, but released for free download and streaming. Series One and Two of the Leicester Square Theatre Podcast were released solely in audio format, with the exception of Stewart Lee's episode, which was initially released as a DVD Extra for Fist of Fun, Series Two. From Series Three onwards all episodes of the show were released in both audio and video format – initially as a paid download, then free on YouTube. Series Seven was the first to be financed by a Kickstarter campaign in order to cover the costs of production. Since Series Seventeen, Richard Herring's Leicester Square Theatre Podcast has been recorded on tour at different venues and, as such, has been referred to only by the acronym title of RHLSTP. After only one episode of Series Nineteen was recorded, the remainder of the series was postponed due to the COVID-19 pandemic. Herring continued to conduct chats and provide new content via Twitch during the lockdowns. Herring's interview with Russell Brand was deleted in 2023 in the wake of a Channel 4 documentary accusing Brand of rape and sexual assault. Interviews with musician Ricky Wilson (singer) and actor Richard E. Grant have never been released. In March 2022 he started releasing the RHLSTP Book Club podcast on Fridays, usually recorded remotely, where he chatted with authors about one of their books. Herring announced in 2026 that he would be ending the main podcast but would continue the spin-off Book Club.

== Episode guide ==
=== Edinburgh Fringe Podcast ===
Series One Recorded 3–28 August 2011
#	Guest(s)	Stand-Up
01	Michael Legge	Catie Wilkins
02	Matthew Crosby	Lou Sanders
03	Tony Law	Chris McCausland
04	Andy Zaltzman	The Behemoth
05	Dan Antopolski	Nick Helm
06	Susan Calman	Naz Osmanoglu
07	Glenn Wool	Simon Munnery
08	Dave Gorman	Nick Doody
09	Paul Sinha	Tania Edwards
10	Francesca Martinez	Holly Walsh
11	Sarah Millican	Sara Pascoe
12	Ray Peacock	Katherine Ryan
13	Shappi Khorsandi	Simon Donald
14	Barry Cryer	Edward Aczel
15	Josh Howie	Josh Widdicombe
16	Simon Munnery	Matt Green
17	Dan Tetsell	Lee Camp
18	Al Murray	Martin Mor
19	Dave Fulton	Steve Gribbin
20	Omid Djalili	Jen Brister
21	Paul Provenza	Joe Lycett
22	Phil Nichol	Markus Birdman
23	Rumpel	Matt Kirshen
24	Isy Suttie	Andrew O'Neill
25	Adam Buxton	Seymour Mace

Series Two Recorded 2–27 August 2012
#	Guest(s)	Stand-Up
26	Sarah Kendall	Iszi Lawrence
27	Ray Peacock & Ed Gamble	Catie Wilkins
28	Marek Larwood	Doug Segal
29	Andrew O'Neill	Juliet Meyers
30	Simon Munnery	Mary Bourke
31	Lucy Porter	Markus Birdman
32	Mick Foley	Gavin Webster
33	Nina Conti	Christian Reilly
34	Matthew Kelly	Matthew Osborn
35	Craig Campbell	Helen Keen
36	Janet Ellis	Ahir Shah
37	Brendon Burns	Gráinne Maguire
38	Sarah Millican	Pete Johansson
39	Tony Law	Lou Sanders
40	Susan Calman	Tiffany Stevenson
41	Nick Helm	Jay Foreman
42	Simon Donald	Helen Arney
43	Al Murray	Celia Pacquola
44	Michael Legge	Jarlath Regan
45	Felicity Ward	Hayley Ellis
46	Nick Doody	Steve Gribbin
47	Simon Evans	Lloyd Langford
48	Martin Mor	Ro Campbell
49	Phil Nichol	Tony Jameson
50	Rumpel, Orbax & Pepper	Keir McAllister

Series Three Recorded 31 July–26 August 2013
#	Guest(s)	Stand-Up
51	Jenny Eclair	Alfie Brown
52	David Baddiel	Katie Mulgrew
53	Norman Lovett	Christian Reilly
54	Brendon Burns & John Lloyd	Keith Farnan
55	Susan Calman	Lee Camp
56	Rory McGrath & Josh Widdicombe	Carly Smallman
57	Ian Lavender & Tony Law	Carey Marx
58	Janey Godley & Ashley Storrie	Doug Segal
59	Omid Djalili & Ben Moor	Michael J Dolan
60	David O'Doherty & Michael Legge	Felicity Ward
61	Greg Proops & Hannibal Buress	Lost Voice Guy
62	Milton Jones & Bo Burnham	Paul Gannon
63	Sarah Millican	Geoff Norcott
64	Sean Hughes & Paul Foot	Benny Boot
65	Terry Alderton & Ardal O'Hanlon	Zoe Lyons
66	Fred MacAulay & Colt Cabana	Nadia Kamil
67	Al Murray & Paul Provenza	Sally-Anne Hayward
68	Alexei Sayle	David Kay
69	Ray Peacock & Ed Gamble	Dana Alexander
70	Mark Thomas & Rob Delaney	Chris Stokes
71	Paul Putner & Scroobius Pip	Sarah Campbell
72	Ed Byrne & Bridget Christie	Luke Wright
73	Caroline Rhea & Alex Lowe as Barry from Watford	Alex Edelman
74	Stewart Lee as Baconface & Simon Donald	Jarleth Regan
75	Jason Manford	Wayne Mazadza

Series Four Recorded 5–25 August 2017
#	Guest(s)
76	Doug Anthony All Stars
77	James Acaster
78	Iain Stirling & Jason Manford
79	John Robins & Ahir Shah

=== Leicester Square Theatre Podcast ===
Series One Recorded 7 May – 26 June 2012
#	Guest(s)
01	Tim Minchin
02	Jonathan Ross
03	Francesca Martinez
04	Charlie Higson
05	Charlie Brooker
06	Nick Frost
07	David Baddiel
08	Stewart Lee
09	Armando Iannucci & Graham Linehan

Series Two Recorded 1 October – 3 December 2012
#	Guest(s)
10	Rob Delaney
11	Steve Pemberton & Reece Shearsmith
12	Peter Serafinowicz
13	David Mitchell
14	Dave Gorman
15	Adam Buxton
Extra	Stand-Up 2012
16	Russell Howard

Series Three Recorded 7 May, 28 May – 1 July 2013
#	Guest(s)
Special	Pappy's at Machynlleth Comedy Festival
Special	Sony Awards
17	Chris Addison
Extra:	Stand-Up 2013
18	Stephen Fry
19	Mary Beard
20	John Lloyd
21	Russell Brand
22	Edgar Wright
23	Mark Thomas
24	Isy Suttie
25	Sean Hughes

Series Four Recorded 30 September – 28 October 2013
#	Guest
26	Shappi Khorsandi
27	Rufus Hound
28	Miranda Hart
29	Miles Jupp
30	Dara Ó Briain
31	Ross Noble
32	Simon Pegg
33	Stephen Merchant

Series Five Recorded 17 February – 24 March, 2 May 2014
#	Guest(s)
34	Adam Buxton
35	Jenny Eclair
36	Helen Zaltzman & Olly Mann
37	Robert Llewellyn
38	Alexei Sayle
39	Greg Davies
40	Danny Baker
41	Josie Long
42	Harry Shearer
43	Susan Calman
44	Jon Ronson
45	Nick Helm
Special	Mike Wozniak at Machynlleth Comedy Festival

Series Six Recorded 29 September – 24 November 2014
#	Guest(s)
46	Katherine Ryan
47	Mark Gatiss
48:	Brendon Burns
49	James Acaster
50	Steve Coogan
51	Sara Pascoe
52	Sarah Millican
53	Rebecca Front
54	Josh Widdicombe
55	Andy Zaltzman
56	Richard Osman
57	Michael Legge
58	Milton Jones
59	Victoria Coren Mitchell
60	Sue Perkins
61	Ben Goldacre
62	Paul Putner & Trevor Lock
63	Stewart Lee (TMWRNJ Special)
Special	Sofie Hagen at the Spike Sligo Festival

Series Seven Recorded 1 June – 27 July 2015
#	Guest(s)
64	Bob Mortimer
65	Lou Sanders
66	Emma Kennedy
67	Romesh Ranganathan
68	Robert Webb
69	Louis Theroux
70	Roisin Conaty
71	Johnny Vegas
72	Mark Watson
73	Robin Ince
74	Rob Delaney & Sharon Horgan
75	Jessica Hynes
76	Bridget Christie
77	Brett Goldstein
78	Paul Sinha
79	Al Murray
80	Limmy
81	Joe Lycett

Series Eight Recorded 27 September – 29 November 2015
#	Guest
82	Stuart Goldsmith
83	Diane Morgan
84	Lee Mack
85	Janey Godley
86	Robert Popper
87	Luisa Omielan
88	John Finnemore
DVD Exclusive	Richard Herring
89	Sarah Kendall
90	Eddie Izzard
91	Phill Jupitus
92	Jack Whitehall
93	John Robins
94	David Mitchell
95	Hal Cruttenden
96	Scroobius Pip
97	Aisling Bea
98	Ray Peacock
99	Cariad Lloyd
100	Richard Bacon

Series Nine Recorded 6 June – 25 July 2016
#	Guest
101	Iain Lee
102	Tony Law
103	Lauren Laverne
104	Ben Bailey Smith
105	Marcus Brigstocke
106	David Cross
107	Vic Reeves
108	Susie Dent
109	Nish Kumar
110	Matthew Crosby
111	Graham Linehan
112	Sofie Hagen
113	Russell Kane
114	Tim Minchin
115	Tom Parry
116	Elis James
Special	Lord Mayor Dave Taylor at the Great Yorkshire Fringe
Special	Mark Addy at the Great Yorkshire Fringe

Series Ten Recorded 3 October – 28 November 2016
#	Guest
Special	Dan Schreiber at the London Podcast Festival
117	Armando Iannucci
118	Hans Teeuwen
119	Dane Baptiste
120	Caitlin Moran
121	Will Smith
122	Tony Robinson
123	Kerry Godliman
124	Chris Addison
125	Ed Gamble
126	Deborah Frances-White
127	Dawn French
128	Tom Davis
129	Susan Calman
130	Jess Thom aka Touretteshero
131	Sarah Millican
132	Simon Munnery
133	Lucy Porter
134	Peter Serafinowicz

Series Eleven Recorded 5 June – 24 July 2017
#	Guest(s)
Special	Bec Hill at Wells Comedy Festival
135	Paul Merton
136	Joe Thomas
137	Jessica Knappett
138	Adam Buxton
139	Zoe Lyons
140	Andrew Collins
141	David Baddiel
Special	Rahul Kohli and Martin Barrass at the Great Yorkshire Fringe
142	Brendon Burns and Craig Quartermaine
143	Dan Skinner
144	Katy Brand
145	Julian Clary
146	Limmy
147	Arthur Smith
148	Robert Webb
149	Ed Byrne
150	Sara Pascoe

Series Twelve Recorded 16 October – 27 November 2017
#	Guest(s)
151	Ellie Taylor
152	Armando Iannucci
153	Rachel Parris
154	John Moloney
155	Jan Ravens
156	Ed Miliband and Geoff Lloyd
157	Greg Jenner
158	Simon Brodkin
159	Richard Osman
160	Reginald D Hunter
161	Johann Hari
162	Katy Wix
163	Paul Chowdhry
164	Dave Gorman

Series Thirteen Recorded 5 February – 2 April 2018
#	Guest(s)
165	Kathy Burke
166	Adam Kay
167	John Robins and Elis James
168	Danielle Ward
169	Trevor and Simon
170	Jess Phillips
171	Mackenzie Crook
172	Kiri Pritchard-McLean and Rachel Fairburn aka All Killa No Filla
173	Katherine Ryan
174	Peter Baynham
175	Brian Blessed
176	Pippa Evans
177	Maria Bamford
178	Sophie Willan
179	Desiree Burch
180	Al Murray
181	My Dad Wrote a Porno
182	Mark Steel
Special	Jessica Fostekew and Holly Burn at Machynlleth Comedy Festival
Special	Michael Eavis at Wells Comedy Festival (unbroadcast)

Series Fourteen Recorded 24 September – 19 November 2018
#	Guest(s)
183	Jonathan Ames
184	Alex Horne
185	Ross Noble
Special	Toby Hadoke at Manchester Podcast Festival
186	Lou Sanders
Special	Glenn Wool at Manchester Podcast Festival
187	Alice Lowe
188	Jess Robinson
189	Drunk Women Solving Crime
190	Greg Davies
191	Rose Matafeo
192	Nish Kumar
193	James O'Brien
194	Amanda Abbington
195	Joe Lycett
196	Fingers on Buzzers
197	Rick Edwards
198	Sanjeev Bhaskar
199	Terry Hall
200	Adam Buxton

Series Fifteen Recorded 4 February – 1 April 2019
#	Guest(s)
201	Sathnam Sanghera (recorded at Bilston Town Hall)
Special	Tim Vine at Bristol Slapstick Festival
Special	Joe Thomas and Damon Beesley at Bristol Slapstick Festival
Special	The Goodies at Bristol Slapstick Festival
202	Jon Ronson
203	Emily Atack
204	Rob Brydon
205	David Morrissey
206	Peter Lord – Komedia Bath
207	Kerry Howard – Komedia Bath
208	James Acaster
209	London Hughes
210	Suzi Ruffell
211	Joel Dommett
212	Matt Forde
213	Les Dennis
214	Matt Lucas
215	Rosie Jones
N/A	Richard E. Grant (unbroadcast)
216	Tiff Stevenson
217	Adrian Chiles – Birmingham Town Hall
218	Nicholas Parsons
219	Do The Right Thing Podcast
Special	Kay Mellor – Theatre Royal, Wakefield
220	Alice Roberts
Special	Rob Rouse – Theatre Royal, Wakefield
221	No Such Thing as a Fish
Special	Fiona Allen at Henley Festival
Special	Richard Herring interviewed by Sarah Benetto at Deer Shed Festival
Special	Rebecca Callard at the Great Yorkshire Fringe

Series Sixteen Recorded 2–25 August 2019 at New Town Theatre, Edinburgh
#	Guests
Ed. 1	Laura Lexx and Tony Law
Ed. 2	Lucy Beaumont and Scummy Mummies
Ed. 3	Jena Friedman and Phil Wang
Ed. 4	Sophie Duker and Vikki Stone
Ed. 5	Jayde Adams and David O'Doherty
Ed. 6	John Robins and Snjólaug Lúðvíksdóttir
Ed. 7	Janey Godley & Ashley Storrie and Spencer Jones
Ed. 8	Steph Tisdell and Jen Brister
Ed. 9	Tony Slattery and Isma Alma
Ed. 10	Lauren Pattison and Geoff Norcott
Ed. 11	Richard Osman
Ed. 12	Rob Auton and Lost Voice Guy
Ed. 13	Arabella Weir and Bryony Kimmings
Ed. 14	Sunil Patel and Daliso Chaponda
Ed. 15	Fern Brady and Josie Long
Ed. 16	Sarah Kendall and Rich Wilson
Ed. 17	Tommy Tiernan and Sukh Ojla
Ed. 18	Susan Murray and Alice Fraser
Ed. 19	George Egg and Cally Beaton
Ed. 20	Thom Tuck and Tom Rosenthal
Ed. 21	Flo and Joan and John Kearns

Series Seventeen Recorded 3 April – 26 July 2019
#	Guest(s)
222	Angela Barnes – The Old Market, Brighton
223	Stephen Grant – The Old Market, Brighton
N/A	Ricky Wilson – Leeds City Varieties (unbroadcast)
224	Mark Charnock and Dominic Brunt – Leeds City Varieties
225	Jimmy Cricket – The Lowry, Salford
226	Sarah Millican – The Lowry, Salford
227	Russell Howard – Kings Place, London
228	Sara Barron – Kings Place, London
229	Michael Sheen – Kings Place, London
Special	Guilty Feminist Mashup with Siobhan McSweeney – Kings Place, London
230	Ed Gamble – Kings Place, London
231	Bobby Mair – Warwick Arts Centre
232	Caroline Quentin – Warwick Arts Centre
233	Shaun Williamson – Marlowe Theatre, Canterbury
234	Vic Reeves – Marlowe Theatre, Canterbury

Series Eighteen Recorded 15 September – 6 December 2019
#	Guest(s)
235	Max and Ivan – Cambridge Corn Exchange
236	Grayson Perry – Leicester Square Theatre
237	Annabel Giles – Theatre Royal, Brighton
238	Ian McMillan – Sheffield City Hall
239	Simon Evans – Theatre Royal, Brighton
240	Seann Walsh – Sheffield City Hall
241	Jenny Eclair – The Haymarket, Leicester
242	Graham Fellows – Hull City Hall
243	Grace Petrie – The Haymarket, Leicester
244	Lucy Beaumont – Hull City Hall
245	Mark Olver – Bristol Old Vic
246	Jayde Adams – Bristol Old Vic
247	Tape Face – Richmond Theatre
248	Nick Frost – Richmond Theatre
249	Ahir Shah – Theatre Royal, Winchester
250	John Kearns – Theatre Royal, Winchester
251	Francesca Stavrakopoulou – Exeter Corn Exchange
252	Mike Wozniak – Exeter Corn Exchange
253	Dave Johns – The Stand, Newcastle
254	Seymour Mace – The Stand, Newcastle
255	Robin Ince – Leicester Square Theatre
256	Athena Kugblenu – Leicester Square Theatre
257	David Reed – Grand Opera House, York
258	Jon Parkin – Grand Opera House, York
259	Kate Robbins – Liverpool Playhouse
260	Frank Cottrell-Boyce – Liverpool Playhouse
261	George Monbiot – Oxford Playhouse
262	Paul Sinha – Oxford Playhouse
263	Tim Minchin – Leicester Square Theatre
264	Sara Pascoe – Leicester Square Theatre
265	Janice Connolly – Manchester Podcast Festival
266	Bethany Black – Manchester Podcast Festival
267	Rachel Parris – Leicester Square Theatre
268	Charlie Brooker – Leicester Square Theatre
269	Olga Koch – Cambridge Corn Exchange
270	Konnie Huq – Leicester Square Theatre
271	Reverend Richard Coles – Northampton Deco
272	Steve McNeil – Northampton Deco
273	Fern Brady – Theatre Royal, Glasgow
274	Limmy – Theatre Royal, Glasgow

Series Nineteen Recorded 9 March 2020 – 20 October 2020
#	Guest(s)
275	Michael Palin – Leicester Square Theatre
276	Aisling Bea – Leicester Square Theatre
277	Adam Buxton – Remote record
278	Michael Spicer – Remote record
279	Mark Watson – Remote record
280	Bill Burr – Remote record
281	Robert Webb – Remote record
282	Kiri Pritchard-McLean – Remote record
283	James Acaster – Remote record
284	Richard Osman – Remote record
285	Greg Jenner – Remote record
286	Lauren Pattison – Remote record
287	Maisie Adam – Remote record
288:	Nathan Caton – Remote record
289	Daniel Sloss – Remote record
290	Jo Caulfield – Remote record
291	Bettany Hughes – Remote record
292	Bilal Zafar – Remote record
293	Sophie Duker – Remote record
294	Sindhu Vee – Remote record
Special	Ally and Sally (Victorian dolls) – Remote record
295	Maria Konnikova – Remote record
296	Michael Fenton Stevens – Remote record
297	Michael Ian Black – Remote record
298	Stevie Martin – Remote record
299	John Kearns – Remote record
300	Richard Herring interviewed by John Robins – Angel Comedy Club at The Bill Murray Pub, Islington, London

Series Twenty Recorded 28 October 2020 – 14 April 2021
#	Guest(s)
301	Ed Gamble – Remote record
302	Nell Scovell – Remote record
303	Arthur Mathews – Remote record
304	Kiell Smith-Bynoe – Remote record
305	Alistair Green – Remote record
306	Marek Larwood – Remote record
307	Rhod Gilbert – Remote record
308	Lou Conran – Remote record
309	Alexei Sayle – Remote record
310	Catherine Bohart – Remote record
311	Nina Conti – Remote record
312	Dr. Sophie Hay – Remote record
313	Ashley Storrie – Remote record
314	Danny Robins – Remote record
315	Nish Kumar – Clapham Grand
316	Lou Sanders – Clapham Grand
317	Iszi Lawrence – Remote record
318	Alice Fraser – Remote record
Special	Joan and Jericha for Comic Relief
319	Mary Lynn Rajskub – Remote record
320	Jeremy Paxman – Remote record
321	Brian Regan – Remote record
322	John Oliver – Remote record
323	Dominik Diamond – Remote record
324	Andi Osho – Remote record
325	Pippa Evans – Remote record

Series Twenty-one Recorded 21 April 2021 – 13 August 2021
#	Guest(s)
326	Anneka Rice – Remote record
327	Catherine Wilkins – Remote record
328	Mae Martin – Remote record
329	Felicity Ward – Remote record
330	Jackie Weaver – Remote record
331	Nigel Planer – Remote record
332	Geoff Norcott – Clapham Grand
333	Sarah Kendall – Clapham Grand
334	Jessie Cave – Clapham Grand
335	Johnny Vegas – Clapham Grand
336	John Robins – Clapham Grand
337	David Baddiel – Clapham Grand
338	Isy Suttie – Clapham Grand
339	No Such Thing as a Fish – Clapham Grand
340	Robin Askwith – Clapham Grand
341	James Acaster & Ed Gamble – Clapham Grand
342	Jay Rayner – Norwich
343	Matthew Holness – Norwich

Series Twenty-Two Recorded 29 August 2021 – 19 February 2022
#	Guest(s)
344	Stevie Martin and Tessa Coates – Leicester Square Theatre
345	Barry Cryer – Leicester Square Theatre
346	Bob Mortimer – Leicester Square Theatre
347	The Parapod – Leicester Square Theatre
348	David Mitchell – Leicester Square Theatre
349	Tim Key – Leicester Square Theatre
350	Louise Wener – Leicester Square Theatre
351	Adam Buxton and Joe Cornish – Leicester Square Theatre
352	Katherine Ryan – Leicester Square Theatre
353	Shaparak Khorsandi – Leicester Square Theatre
354	Dave Gorman – Leicester Square Theatre
355	Phil Wang – Leicester Square Theatre
356	Ben Shephard – Leicester Square Theatre
357	Deborah Meaden – Leicester Square Theatre
358	Emma Dabiri – Leicester Square Theatre
359	Miriam Margolyes – Leicester Square Theatre
360	Margaret Cabourn-Smith – The Phoenix, Cavendish Square, London
361	Chris Lynam – The Phoenix, Cavendish Square, London
362	Peter Baynham – Remote record
363	Laura Lexx – Remote record
364:	Laura Jean Marsh – Remote record
365	Gráinne Maguire – Remote record
366	David Cross – Remote record
367	Ahir Shah – The Phoenix, Cavendish Square, London
368	Mark Watson – The Phoenix, Cavendish Square, London
369	Jon Culshaw – St George's, Bristol
Special	Robin Ince and Richard Herring Desert Island Flicks – Watershed, Bristol
370	Joz Norris – Leicester Comedy Festival
371	Rebecca Wheatley – Leicester Comedy Festival
Special	Robin Ince and Richard Herring Morecambe and Wise – Eric Morecambe Centre, Harpenden

Series Twenty-Three Recorded 28 February 2022 – 29 July 2022
#	Guest(s)
372	Paul Chuckle – Leicester Square Theatre
373	Janina Ramirez – Leicester Square Theatre
374	Charley Boorman – Leicester Square Theatre
375	Terry Christian – Leicester Square Theatre
376	Maria Bamford – Remote record
377	Jamie Demetriou – Leicester Square Theatre
378	Samira Ahmed Leicester Square Theatre
379	Armando Iannucci – Leicester Square Theatre
380	Rosie Holt – Leicester Square Theatre
381	Deborah Frances-White – Leicester Square Theatre
382	Ardal O'Hanlon – Leicester Square Theatre
383	Freya Parker and Celeste Dring aka Lazy Susan – Leicester Square Theatre
384	Amy Gledhill – Leicester Square Theatre
385	Dara Ó Briain – Leicester Square Theatre
386	Alan Davies – Leicester Square Theatre
387	Dick and Dom – The Phoenix, Cavendish Square, London
388	Bilal Zafar – The Phoenix, Cavendish Square, London
389	Seann Walsh – The Phoenix, Cavendish Square, London
390	Kunt and the Gang – The Phoenix, Cavendish Square, London
391	Meryl O'Rourke – The Phoenix, Cavendish Square, London
392	Daliso Chaponda – Deer Shed Festival, Thirsk

Series Twenty-Four Recorded 3 August 2022 – 9 September 2022 at Assembly Rooms Edinburgh, except ep. 405
#	Guest(s)
393	Harriet Dyer
394	Kiri Pritchard-McLean and Rachel Fairburn aka All Killa No Filla
395	Conrad Koch
396	Vir Das
397	Janey Godley
398	Flo and Joan
399	John Robins
400	Janeane Garofalo
401	Ed Gamble
402	Tim Key
403	Sanjeev Kohli
404	Omid Djalili
405	Doug Stanhope – Remote record

Series Twenty-Five Recorded 5 September 2022 – 28 November 2022
#	Guest(s)
406	Reece Shearsmith – Leicester Square Theatre
407	Eleanor Morton – Leicester Square Theatre
408	Pierre Novellie – Leicester Square Theatre
409	Sally Phillips – Leicester Square Theatre
410	Bob Mortimer – Leicester Square Theatre
411	The Socially Distant Sports Bar – Leicester Square Theatre
412	Sara Pascoe – Leicester Square Theatre
413	Chris McCausland – Leicester Square Theatre
414	Ria Lina – Bedford Pub, Balham
415	Joe Lycett – Leicester Square Theatre
416	James Acaster – Leicester Square Theatre
417	Anneka Rice – Leicester Square Theatre
418	Victoria Coren Mitchell – Leicester Square Theatre
419	Philippa Perry – Leicester Square Theatre
420	Humphrey Ker – Leicester Square Theatre
421	Mathew Baynton and Jim Howick – Leicester Square Theatre
422	Sarah Keyworth – Leicester Square Theatre
423	Rich Hall – Leicester Square Theatre
424	Sikisa – Leicester Square Theatre
425	Paul Chowdhry – Leicester Square Theatre
426	Sophie Ellis-Bextor – Leicester Square Theatre

Series Twenty-Six Recorded 30 January 2023 – 27 March 2023
#	Guest(s)
427	Stephen Merchant – Leicester Square Theatre
428	Fern Brady – Leicester Square Theatre
429	Josh Widdicombe – Leicester Square Theatre
430	Tim Key – Leicester Square Theatre
431	Zoe Lyons – Leicester Square Theatre
432	Joe Cornish – Leicester Square Theatre
433	John Kearns – Y Theatre, Leicester
434	Nish Kumar – Y Theatre, Leicester
435	Eshaan Akbar – Leicester Square Theatre
436	Al Murray – Leicester Square Theatre
437	Kiell Smith-Bynoe – Leicester Square Theatre
438	Catherine Bohart – Leicester Square Theatre
439	Mark Gatiss – Leicester Square Theatre
440	Jordan Gray – Leicester Square Theatre
441	Suggs – Leicester Square Theatre
442	Rhys James – Leicester Square Theatre
443	Janet Ellis – Leicester Square Theatre
444	Sophie Duker – Leicester Square Theatre

Series Twenty-Seven Recorded 27 May 2023 – 17 July 2023
#	Guest(s)
445	Thanyia Moore – Leicester Square Theatre
446	Jenny Eclair – Leicester Square Theatre
447	Ola Labib – Forest Arts, New Milton
448	Colin Hoult – Hangar Farm Arts Centre, Southampton
449	Mike Bubbins – Leicester Square Theatre
450	Catherine Tate – Leicester Square Theatre
451	Andy Nyman and Jeremy Dyson – Leicester Square Theatre
452	John Robins – Cedars Hall, Wells
453	Bridget Christie – Leicester Square Theatre
454	Adam Rowe – Leicester Square Theatre
455	Elf Lyons – Angel Comedy Club at The Bill Murray Pub, Islington, London
456	Paul Sinha – Angel Comedy Club at The Bill Murray Pub, Islington, London
457	Markus Birdman – Forest Arts, New Milton
Audible Comedy Club	Lou Sanders – Remote record
458	Alison Spittle – Angel Comedy Club at The Bill Murray Pub, Islington, London
459	Paul Foot – Hanger Farms Arts Centre, Southampton
460	Ed Byrne – Leicester Square Theatre
461	Jazz Emu – Leicester Square Theatre
462	Micky Overman – Angel Comedy Club at The Bill Murray Pub, Islington, London
463	Mike Birbiglia – Remote record
464	Ben Willbond and Larry Rickard – Leicester Square Theatre
465	Alistair Green – Leicester Square Theatre
466	Peter Baynham – Leicester Square Theatre
467	Nigel Planer – Leicester Square Theatre
468	Sarah Millican – Leicester Square Theatre

Series Twenty-Eight Recorded 8 September 2023 – 18 November 2023
#	Guest(s)
469	Adil Ray – Birmingham Town Hall
470	Joe Lycett – Birmingham Town Hall
471	Peter Hooton – Liverpool Playhouse
472	Neil Fitzmaurice – Liverpool Playhouse
473	Harriet Kemsley – Winchester Theatre Royal
474	Matt Green – Winchester Theatre Royal
475	Spencer Jones – Northcott Theatre, Exeter
476	Peter Richardson – Northcott Theatre, Exeter
477	Rob Reiner – Remote record
478	Stuart Goldsmith – Bath Komedia
479	Jarred Christmas – Bath Komedia
480	Lisa McGee – Belfast MAC
481	Shane Todd – Belfast MAC
482	Vasyl Baidak – Remote record
483	Lauren Pattison – Newcastle upon Tyne Stand
484	Jason Cook – Newcastle Stand
485	Jeff Innocent – Norwich Playhouse
486	Robert Bathurst – Tunbridge Wells Assembly Hall
487	Steve Pemberton – Leicester Square Theatre
488	Corinne Bailey Rae – Leicester Square Theatre
489	Amar Latif – Leicester Square Theatre
490	Sooz Kempner – Leicester Square Theatre
491	Lee Mack – Princes Hall, Aldershot
492	Davina McCall Leicester Square Theatre
493	Ross Noble – Leicester Square Theatre
494	Emma Sidi – Norwich Playhouse
495	Joe Pasquale – Norwich Playhouse
496	Julia Sawalha – Leicester Square Theatre
497	Jon Pointing – Northampton Royal
498	Abigoliah Schamaun – Northampton Royal
499	Jon Ronson – Leicester Square Theatre
500	Hayley Ellis – Chorley Little Theatre

Series Twenty-Nine Recorded 23 November 2023 – 23 July 2024
#	Guest(s)
501	Lloyd Griffith – Nottingham Playhouse
502	Scott Bennett and Jemma Bennett – Nottingham Playhouse
503	Katie Mulgrew – The Lowry, Salford
504	Justin Moorhouse – The Lowry, Salford
505	Bob Mortimer – Leicester Square Theatre
506	Urooj Ashfaq – Leicester Square Theatre
507	Rufus Jones - Brighton Komedia
508	Maisie Adam - Brighton Komedia
509	Armando Iannucci – Leicester Square Theatre
510	Rob Brydon – Leicester Square Theatre
511	Tony Gardner – Mercury Theatre, Colchester
512	Nick Wilty Gukbenkian Theatre, Canterbury
513	Neil Hannon – 3Olympia Dublin
514	Marjolein Robertson – Queen's Hall, Edinburgh
515	Phil Hammond Redgrave Theatre, Bristol
516	Abi Clarke – Redgrave Theatre, Bristol
517	Phil Ellis Y Theatre Leicester
518	Simon Munnery– Y Theatre Leicester
519	Olaf Falafel Bedford Corn Exchange
520	Susie McCabe Oran Mor, Glasgow
521	Nerine Skinner Remote record
522	Stevie Martin Remote record
523	Dan Tiernan Remote record
524	Stuart Laws Remote record
525	Lindsey Santoro Warwick Arts Centre
526	Tommy Tiernan 3 Olympia Dublin
527	Charlotte Church – Sherman Theatre Cardiff
528	Benjamin Partridge Sherman Theatre Cardiff
529	Tom Wrigglesworth – Sheffield City Hall
530	Paul Heaton Sheffield City Hall
531	Adam Buxton – Leicester Square Theatre
532	The Exploding Heads – Warwick Arts Centre
533	Al Murray – Bedford Corn Exchange
534	Fred MacAulay Oran Mor, Glasgow
N/A	Bob Mortimer Hull City Hall (not broadcast)
535	Tommy Cannon – Hull City Hall

Series Thirty Recorded 24 September 2024 – 25 November 2024
#	Guest(s)
536	Peter Serafinowicz – Leicester Square Theatre
537	Peter Serafinowicz – Leicester Square Theatre
538	Adrian Edmondson – Leicester Square Theatre
539	James Acaster – Leicester Square Theatre
540	Michael Sheen – Leicester Square Theatre
541	Doon Mackichan – Leicester Square Theatre
542	Fern Brady – Leicester Square Theatre
543	Count Binface – Leicester Square Theatre
544	Ruth Husko – Birmingham Town Hall
545	Josh Pugh – Birmingham Town Hall
546	Chelsea Birkby – Leicester Square Theatre
547	Ivo Graham – Leicester Square Theatre
548	Milton Jones – Leicester Square Theatre
549	Dave Gorman – Leicester Square Theatre recorded 3 February 2025
550	Nish Kumar - Leicester Square Theatre
551	Andy Zaltzman – Leicester Square Theatre
552	Poppy Hillstead – Leicester Square Theatre
553	Amy Gledhill – Leicester Square Theatre
554	Chesney Hawkes – Leicester Square Theatre

Series Thirty One Recorded 3 February 2025 –16 July 2025
#	Guest(s)
555	Larry and Paul – Leicester Square Theatre
556	Chris Donald and Simon Donald off of Viz – Y Theatre Leicester
557	John Robertson – Y Theatre Leicester
558	Alexandra Haddow – Leicester Square Theatre
559	Chloe Radcliffe – Leicester Sq Theatre
560	John Kearns – Leicester Square Theatre
561	Paul Whitehouse – Leicester Sq Theatre
562	Amy Hoggart – Leicester Square Theatre
563	Tim Key – Leicester Square Theatre
564	Nick Helm – The Podcast Room
565	Rosie Jones – The Podcast Room
566	Maurice Gran – The Podcast Room
567	Joz Norris – The Podcast Room
568	John Dowie – St Neots
569	Glenn Moore – The Podcast Room
570	Barry Ferns – The Bill Murray
571	Chloe Petts – The Bill Murray
572	Catherine Wilkins – Hitchin
573	Ian Smith – The Podcast Room

Series Thirty Two Recorded 30th July 2025 –
#	Guest(s)
574	Kieran Hodgson – Stand 3 Edinburgh
575	Zainab Johnson – Stand 3 Edinburgh
576	Andrew O'Neill – Stand 3 Edinburgh
577	Bernie Clifton Part 1 recorded 5th July 2025– Sheffield Playhouse
578	Bernie Clifton Part 2 – Sheffield Playhouse
579	Esther Manito– recorded 24th May 2025 The Elgiva, Chesham
580	Tim Key – Stand 3 Edinburgh
581	Simon Brodkin – The Podcast Room
582	Ania Magliano Stand 3 Edinburgh
583	Tom Rosenthal Stand 3 Edinburgh
584	Nina Conti Stand 3 Edinburgh
585	Joe Kent-Walters Stand 3 Edinburgh
586	Andy Parsons Stand 3 Edinburgh
587	David O'Doherty Stand 3 Edinburgh
588	The Cryptid Factor Stand 3 Edinburgh
589	Nish Kumar Stand 3 Edinburgh
590	Rhys James The Podcast Room
591	Richard Ayoade Leicester Square Theatre
592	Paul F. Tompkins Leicester Square Theatre

Series Thirty-Three Released 7th January 2026 – 17th August 2026
#	Guest(s)
593	Sam Nicoresti – St George's Hall, Bewdley
594	Carl Donnelly – St George's Hall, Bewdley
595	Richard Osman – Leicester Square Theatre
596	Mathew Baynton – Leicester Square Theatre
597	Mark Simmons – The Podcast Room
598	Matt Parker – The Podcast Room
599	Adam Pearson – The Podcast Room
600	Fatiha El-Ghorri – Y Theatre Leicester
601	Rob Auton – Y Theatre Leicester
602	Stevie Martin – Chelmsford Theatre
603	Vittorio Angelone – Chelmsford Theatre
604	Bilal Zafar - Podcast Room
605	Stephen Bailey – Podcast Room
606	Wendy Wason – Podcast Room
607	Andy Hamilton – Leicester Square Theatre
608	Michelle Wolf – Leicester Square Theatre
609	Matt Forde – Leicester Square Theatre
610	Jameela Jamil – Leicester Square Theatre
611	Natasha Hodgson – Leicester Square Theatre
612	David Mitchell – Leicester Square Theatre
613	Ronni Ancona – The Podcast Room
614	Tim Minchin– The Podcast Room
615	Lorna Rose Treen – The Podcast Room
616	Harry Shearer and Tom Leopold - Remote record
617	Mitch Benn Part 1 – Norbury Theatre Droitwich
618	Mitch Benn Part 2 – Norbury Theatre Droitwich
619	Chris Cantrill - Remote Record
620	Rosalie Minnitt - Remote Record
621	Tom Neenan - Remote Record
622	Charly Clive and Ellen Robertson - Podcast Room
623	Bella Hull - Podcast Room

Series Thirty Four Released 26 August 2026 –
#	Guest(s)
624	John Robins – Podcast Room
625	Lucy Porter – Podcast Room
626	Mhairi Black – Stand 3, Edinburgh
627	Penn Jillette and Piff the Magic Dragon – Podcast Room
628	Paddy Young – Stand 3, Edinburgh
629	Isy Suttie – Leicester Square Theatre
630	Susie McCabe – Stand 3, Edinburgh
631	Felicity Ward – Stand 3, Edinburgh
632	Mark Thomas - Stand 3, Edinburgh
633	Lenny Henry (part 1) – Podcast Room
634	Lenny Henry (part 2) – Podcast Room
635	David Baddiel – Podcast Room
636	Mathew Baynton and Jim Howick – Leicester Square Theatre
637	James Acaster – Leicester Square Theatre
638	Susan Calman – Podcast Room
639	MC Hammersmith – Stand 3, Edinburgh

=== RHLSTP Book Club ===
Series One Released 11 March 2022 – 29 July 2022
#	Guest(s)	Book
01	Catie Wilkins	You're Not The Boss of Me
02	Robin Ince	The Importance of Being Interested: Adventures in Scientific Curiosity
03	Ed Patrick	Catch Your Breath: The Secret Life of a Sleepless Anaesthetist
04	Al Murray	The Last 100 Years (More or Less) And All That
05	Greg Jenner	Ask A Historian: 50 Surprising Answers to Things You Always Wanted to Know
06	Francesca Stavrakopoulou	God: An Anatomy
07	Rachel Parris	Advice From Strangers: Everything I Know from People I Don't Know
08	Matt Winning	Hot Mess: What on Earth Can We Do About Climate Change?
09	Katherine Rundell	Super-Infinite: The Transformations of John Donne
10	Sukh Ojla	Sunny
11	Georgia Pritchett	My Mess is a Bit of a Life: Adventures in Anxiety
12	Emma Kennedy	Letters From Brenda
13	Sam Knight	The Premonitions Bureau
14	Andrew Hunter Murray	The Sanctuary
15	Alice Roberts	Buried: An Alternative History of The First Millennium in Britain
16	Stephanie Merritt	Storm
17	Laura Lexx	Pivot
18	Guy Leschziner	The Man Who Tasted Words: Inside the Strange and Startling World of Our Senses
19	Marianne Levy	Don't Forget to Scream: Unspoken Truths About Motherhood
20	Malcolm Gaskill	The Ruin of All Witches: Life and Death in the New World

Series Two Released 2 September- 16 December 2022
#	Guest(s)	Book
21	Erin Kelly	The Skeleton Key
22	Janina Ramirez	Femina: A New History of the Middle Ages, Through the Women Written Out of It
23	Fergus Craig	Murder at Crime Manor
24	Natalie Haynes	Stone Blind
25	Leigh Hosy-Pickett	Up in Smoke
26	Marina Hyde	What Just Happened?
27	Richard Ayoade	The Book that No-One Wanted to Read
28	Richard Herring interviewed by Adam Buxton	Can I Have My Ball Back?
29	Ian Stone	To Be Someone
30	The QI Elves	222 QI Answers to Your Quite Ingenious Questions
31	Stephen Mangan	The Fart that Changed the World
32	Joe Tracini	Ten Things I Hate About Me
33	Adrian Chiles	The Good Drinker
34	Richard Osman	The Bullet that Missed
35	Brenna Hassett	Growing Up Human
36	Mya-Rose Craig	Birdgirl
BONUS	Richard Herring interviewed by Natalie Haynes	Can I Have My Ball Back?

Series Three Released 6 January 2023 – 8 April 2023
#	Guest(s)	Book
37	Rob Manuel	The Best of Fesshole
38	Greg Jenner	You Are History: From The Alarm Clock To The Toilet, The Amazing History of The Things You Use Every Day
39	Rebecca Wragg Sykes	Kindred: Neanderthal Life, Love, Death and Art
40	Dan Schreiber	The Theory of Everything Else
41	John Higgs	Love and Let Die
42	Tom Crewe	The New Life
43	Cariad Lloyd	You Are Not Alone
44	Anthony Irvine (the Iceman)	Melt It! The Book of the Iceman
45	Evie King	Ashes to Admin
46	Matthew Holness	Garth Marenghi's TerrorTome
47	Abigail Burdess	Mother's Day
48	Pope Lonergan	I'll Die After Bingo
49	Ashley Hickson-Lovence	Your Show
50	Kate Devlin	Turned On: Science, Sex and Robots

Series Four Released 7 May 2023 – 7 July 2023
#	Guest(s)	Book
51	David Quantick	Ricky's Hand
52	David Baddiel	The God Desire
53	Jon Ronson	The Debutante: From High Society to White Supremacy
54	Ben Macintyre	Colditz: Prisoners of the Castle
55	Sadiq Kahn	Breathe: Tackling the Climate Emergency
56	Dean Burnett	Emotional Ignorance
57	David Wolstencroft	The Magic Hour
58	Josie Long	Because I Don't Know What You Mean And What You Don't
59	Sadia Azmat	Sex Bomb: The Life and Loves of an Asian Babe
60	Steven Wright	Harold

Series Five Released – 1 September 2023 – 22 December 2023
#	Guest(s)	Book
61	Lucy Worsley	Agatha Christie: An Elusive Woman
62	Harriet Gibsone	Is This OK?
63	Caitlin Moran	What About Men?
64	Jena Friedman	Not Funny: Essays on Life, Comedy, Culture, Etcetera
65	David Mitchell	Unruly: A History Of England's Kings and Queens
66	Jo Caulfield	The Funny Thing about Death
67	Danny Robins	Into the Uncanny
68	Simon Farnaby	Ghosts – The Button House Archives
69	Richard Armitage	Geneva
70	Tim Key	Chapters
71	Joe Wilkinson	My (Illustrated) Autobiography
72	Geoff Norcott	The British Bloke Decoded
73	Lou Sanders	What's That Lady Doing?: False Starts and Happy Endings
74	Bec Hill	Horror Heights
75	Dave Cohen	Stand Up, Barry Goldman
76	Ashley Blaker	Normal Schmormal: My Occasionally Helpful Guide to Parenting Kids with Special Needs
77	Alasdair Beckett-King	Montgomery Bonbon: Murder at the Museum

Series Six Released 5 January 2024 – 26 July 2024
#	Guest(s)	Book
78:	Adam Bloom	Finding Your Comic Genius: An In-Depth Guide to the Art of Stand-Up Comedy
79	Farah Karim-Cooper	The Great White Bard: Shakespeare, Race and the Future
80	Tez Ilyas	The Secret Diary of a British Muslim Aged 13 3/4
81	Ian Rankin	A Heart Full of Headstones
82	Bob Cryer	Barry Cryer: Same Time Tomorrow
83	Becky Holmes	Keanu Reeves Is Not In Love With You
84	Mary Beard	Emperor of Rome
85	Rosie Jones	The Amazing Edie Eckhart
86	Cat Jarman	The Bone Chests
87	Jo Hedwig Teeuwisse	Fake History
88	Caimh Mcdonnell	The Stranger Times
89	Ed Gamble	Glutton
90	Rory Carroll	Killing Thatcher
91	Jim Moir and Nancy Sorrell	Birds
92	Lemn Sissay	Let The Light Pour In
93	Sara Pascoe	Weirdo
94	Charan Ranganath	Why We Remember
95	David Grann	The Wager
96	Helen Lederer	Not That I'm Bitter
97	Peter Pomerantsev	How To Win An Information War
98	Kevin Jon Davies	42: The Wildly Improbable Ideas of Douglas Adams
99	Catherine Nixey	Heresy
100	Joel Morris	Be Funny or Die
101	Janey Godley	Janey
102	James Wright	Historic Buildings - Mythbusting
103	Sofie Hagen	Will I Ever Have Sex Again?
104	Marcus Chown	A Crack in Everything
105	The Gibbons Brothers	Alan Partridge - Big Beacon
106	Stefan Stern	Fair or Foul- The Lady Macbeth Guide to Ambition
107	Michael Redmond	Eamon - Older Brother of Jesus

Series Seven Released 13 September 2024 – 20 December 2024
#	Guest(s)	Book
108:	Iszi Lawrence	The Time Machine Next Door
109:	Moon Unit Zappa	Earth To Moon
110:	Pierre Novellie	Why Can't I Just Enjoy Things?
111:	Richard Ayoade	The Unfinished Harauld Hughes
112:	Paul Sinha	One Sinha Lifetime
113:	Eleanor Morton	Life Lessons From Historical Women
114:	Emily Herring	Herald of a Restless World
115:	Robert Popper	The Elsie Drake Letters (aged 104)
116:	Danny Wallace (humorist)	Somebody Told Me
117:	Jenny Eclair	Jokes, Jokes, Jokes
118:	Sir Chris Hoy	All That Matters
119:	Louie Stowell	Loki - A Bad God's Guide To Making Enemies
120:	Kevin Toms	The Origin of Football Manager
121:	Dan Schreiber	Impossible Things
122:	Marc Morris	The Anglo Saxons

Series Eight Released 10 January 2025– 28 July 2025
#	Guest(s)	Book
123:	Benji Waterhouse	You Don't Have To Be Mad To Work Here
124:	Kate Summerscale	The Peepshow
125:	Yvonne Innes	Dip My Brain In Joy
126:	David Peace	Munichs
127:	Nico Tatarowicz	The Centrist Dad Handbook
128:	Julia Raeside	Don't Make Me Laugh
129:	Craig Brown	A Voyage Around The Queen
130:	Lissa Evans	Picnic on Craggy Island
131:	Mark Steel	The Leopard in My House
132:	Catherine Wilkins	Cafe Chaos
133:	Anthony Shapland	A Room Above A Shop
134:	George Monbiot	The Invisible Doctrine
135:	Deborah Frances-White	Six Conversations We're Scared To Have
136:	Kathy Lette	The Revenge Club
137:	Keiran Goddard	I See Buildings Fall Like Lightning
138:	Johnny Ball	My Previous Life in Comedy
139:	Tim Worthington	The Golden Age of Children's TV
140:	George Egg	The Snack Hacker
141:	Chris Whitaker	All The Colours of the Dark
142:	Adam Buxton	I Love You, Byeee
143:	Adam Buxton	'I Love You, Byeee'
144:	David Nicholls	You Are Here
145:	John Dowie	'Before I Go'
146:	Jenny Colgan	Close Knit
147:	Helen Carr	'Sceptered Isle'
148:	Chris Tarrant	For The Love of Bears

Series Nine Released 29 August 2025 – December 12th 2025
#	Guest(s)	Book
149	Angas Tiernan	Minute Cryptic
150	Cariad Lloyd	Where Did She Go?
151	Rhys James	You'll Like It When You Get There
152	Olaf Falafel	A Poo On A Pogo Stick
153	Nigel Planer	Young Once
154	Andrew Lownie	Entitled
155	Emma Doran	Mad Isn't It?
156	Sebastian Faulks	Fires Which Burned Brightly
157	Mark Watson	One Minute Away
158	Andrew Michael Hurley	Saltwash
159	Adam Kay	A Particularly Nasty Case
160	Matt Parker	Love Triangle
161	Robert Ross	Seriously Silly - The Life of Terry Jones
162	Jonathan Freedland	The Traitors Circle
163	Steve Punt	Lost on Infinity
164	Andy Webb	Dianarama
Boxing Day Special	Right Bollock	I, Right Bollock

Series Ten Released 16 January 2026–=
#	Guest(s)	Book
165:	John Lloyd	The Meaning of Liff
166:	Doug Naylor	Sinbin Island
167:	Jess Robinson	Life is Rosi
168:	Danny Robins	Do You Believe in Ghosts?
169:	Jay Foreman	This Way Up
170:	Fergus Craig	I'm Not The Only Murderer in my Retirement Home
171:	Ian Leslie	John and Paul: A Love Story in Songs
172:	Mike Rampton	Poo, What, Where?
173:	Catherine Wilkins	Cafe Chaos - The Way The Cookie Crumbles
174:	Zakia Sewell	Finding Albion
175:	Chris Evans (not that one)	Go Faster Stripe
176:	Emma Jane Unsworth	Slags
177:	Harriet Tyce	Witch Trial
178:	John Robins	Thirst Part 1
179:	John Robins	Thirst Part 2
180:	Brian Bilston	How To Lay An Egg With a Horse Inside
181:	Jonathan Grant	Reading The Room
182:	Andrew Hunter Murray	Bad Deeds
183:	Alex Horne	The Last Pebble
184:	Evie King	Get Ahead of Being Dead
185:	Olly Smith	Death By Noir
186:	Cally Beaton	Namaste Motherfuckers
187:	Abigoliah Schamaun and Joe Wells	Neurodivergent Moments
188:	Turi King	The Secrets of Our DNA
189:	Paul Tonkinson	Running Through Sand
190:	Martin Fitzgerald	The Umbrella Man and Other Stories
191:	Lucy Porter	Middle-Aged Women Get S*** Done

Series Eleven Released September 2026 –
#	Guest(s)	Book
192	Tim Minchin	You Don't Have To Have a Dream
193	Rachael Stirling	All About My Mother
194	David Quantick and Chris Barker	Lost Films of Hollywood
195	Charlie Higson	King Zero
196	Reece Shearsmith	Things I Took From The Dark
197	Jonn Elledge	31 Inventions That Built Our World
198	Andrew Hankinson	Felled
199	Clive Anderson	I Think My Name is Brodie
200	Superhans Matt King (comedian)	Moreish
201	Ian Livingstone	Tomb of the Golden Sun
202	Robin Ince	The Future of Jokes
203	Meera Syal	Vigilauntie
204	Alexei Sayle	How I've Tried to Change the World: By Walking Down the Middle of the Street Shouting
205	Laurence Marks and Maurice Gran	Goodnight Sweetheart - Many Happy Returns

== Reception ==
The Leicester Square Theatre Podcast has won the Internet Award at the 2012, 2013, 2014 and 2018 Chortle Awards, and was the only non-BBC programme to be nominated for the comedy award at the 2013 Sony Radio Awards. The show won a bronze award in the category, becoming the first internet-only award winner in this section. Radiohead's Jonny Greenwood has also heralded the Leicester Square Theatre Podcast citing it as one of his cultural highlights in The Guardian.

In Herring's interview with Stephen Fry, Fry revealed that he had attempted to commit suicide. The story was reported across various newspapers and international news networks including the BBC and Sky News. His now-deleted interview with Russell Brand also came to some press attention several months after its release, the press focusing on Brand discussing pleasuring a man in a public toilet for his 2002 TV show RE:Brand.

== Theme ==
"Try Again" by Pest was used as the theme from the first episode until the end of series 20. From series 21 onwards this was replaced by a theme performed and specifically composed for the show by Scant Regard, the solo project of musician Will Crewdson.
