= Pest (band) =

English electronic band

- Origin: London, England
- Genres: Funk; Electro; Nu-Jazz trip hop
- Years active: 2001–present
- Label: Ninja Tune
- Members: Ben Mallott; Matt Chandler; Tom Marriott; Wayne Urquhart; Vesa Haapanen
- Past members: Adrian Josey
- Website: Home page

Pest are an English electronic band from South London, formerly signed to Ninja Tune, writing and playing music that mixes elements of funk, electronica, jazz and breakbeat. The band consists of Ben Mallott (DJ and keyboards), Matt Chandler (guitar), Tom Marriott (trombone), Wayne Urquhart (cello) and Vesa Haapanen (drums).

Former band member Adrian Josey (a.k.a. Pasta/Saffrolla) worked as DJ, co-producer, lyricist and vocalist on albums Necessary Measures, All Out Fall Out, early singles, and distribution of the band's pre-signed white labels.

== History ==
Chandler and Marriott grew up together in Matlock, Derbyshire, England. Chandler studied music in Liverpool, and Marriott in London where Marriott met the others and the band began.

After releasing their first tracks on white labels, they were signed to Ninja Tune and in 2003 they released their debut album Necessary Measures, followed by their second in 2005 – All Out Fall Out. Pest have toured extensively, headlining many UK venues such as Koko, Cargo and The 100 Club in London, The Tuesday Club in Sheffield, and many festivals across Europe including Les Transmusicales in Rennes, as well as completing a short tour of Japan in 2009, for which they independently released the limited edition EP Meanwhile Backstage.

== Discography ==
=== Albums ===
- Necessary Measures (24 March 2003)
- All Out Fall Out (12 September 2005)

=== Singles ===
- "Slap on Tap" (3 December 2001)
- "Jefferson Shuffle" (13 January 2003)
- "Chicken Spit" (22 September 2003)
- "Pat Pong" (18 July 2005)
- "Wu Ju" (21 November 2005)
- "Kill It" (date unknown)

== Song appearances ==
- The song "Duke Kerb Crawler" was featured in the video game Tony Hawk's American Wasteland.
- A remix version of the song "Pat Pong" was featured in the racing game Blur.
- The song "Delucid" features in Juiced 2: Hot Import Nights
- The song "Chicken Spit" is featured in the Toonami original series IGPX.
- An edit of the intro to the song "Try Again" is used as the theme music for Richard Herring's Leicester Square Theatre Podcast.
