= Doug Segal =

British comedy performer

Doug Segal (born January 1965) is a British comedy performer best known for his live mindreading acts at the Edinburgh Festival Fringe. Segal won a Three Weeks Editors award at the Edinburgh Fringe in 2012 and Best Cabaret Act at the Brighton Fringe Festival in 2012.

== Career ==
Segal has made his name as a regular performer at Fringe Festivals in the UK since 2011. Before this he worked mainly in the corporate market have left the world of advertising to pursue a stage career. His early performance style was very much a "me too" Derren Brown style act but in later years he has developed a style that uses mindreading effects in a light hearted context and combines them with elements of stand up and sketch comedy.

Segal's first fringe festival show I Know What You're Thinking was well received by audiences and critics gaining a number of 4 and 5 star reviews as well as the interest of various notables such as the writer Neil Gaiman. How To Read Minds And Influence People was Segal's 2012 fringe performance for which he won two awards - The Three Weeks Editors Choice Award and The Latest Seven Best Cabaret Act award at the Brighton Fringe. His most recent show I Can Make You a Mentalist premièred at the 2013 Edinburgh Fringe Festival and is a departure from the standard stage mindreader format; with all the effects in the show performed by audience members. Early reviews at the 2013 Edinburgh Fringe were poor in comparison to previous years but the show went on receive numerous 4 and 5 star reviews citing it as 'genre bending' and has been highly praised by reviewers such as Kate Copstick.

"I Can Make You A Mentalist" was toured in the UK & Switzerland by Mick Perrin Worldwide

In 2015 Segal made his Latitude Festival debut and received a four star review from The Public Reviews website

== Television ==
In addition to various appearances on BBC One and BBC Three, Dutch and Japanese TV; Segal has appeared twice as a guest on the Richard Herring's interview podcasts. He also appeared on New Year Live.

== Sources ==
- Three Weeks Editors Choice Awards 2012
- Brighton Fringe 2012 Best Cabaret Cabaret Latest Seven June 2012
- I Can Make You A Mentalist: 4 Stars Fringe Guru August 2013
- I Can Make You a Mentalist: 5 Stars Festival Journal August 2013
- I Can Make You a Mentalist: 5 Stars Arts Awards Magazine August 2013
- How To Read Minds And Influence People - 4 Stars Edinburgh Evening News August 2012
- How To Read Minds And Influence People: 5 Stars Brighton Argus May 2012
- I Know What You're Thinking: 4 Stars Edinburgh Spotlight August 2011
- I Know What You're Thinking: 5 Stars The Public Reviews August 2011
