= Stuart Laws =

British comedian and director (born 1984)

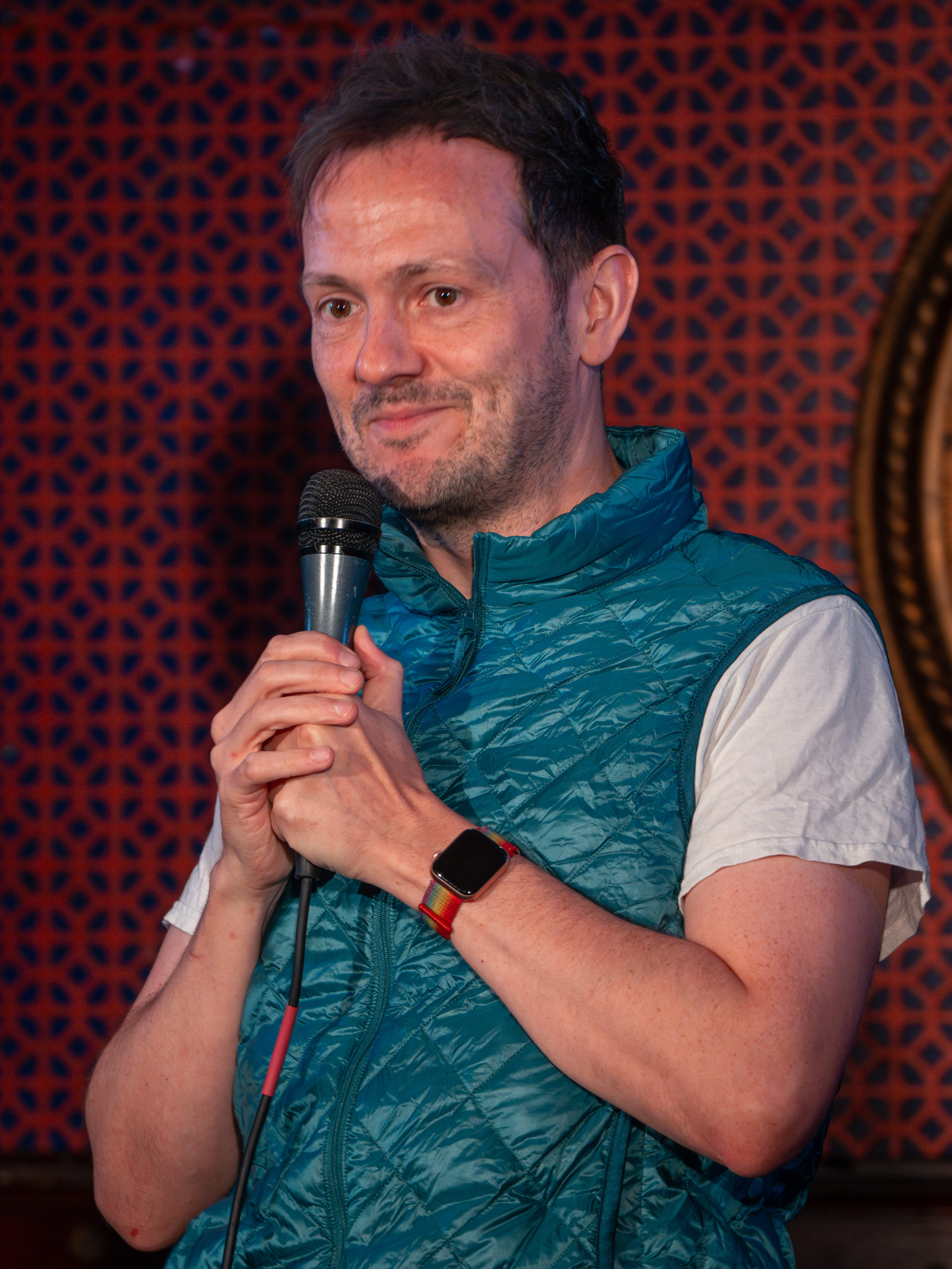
- Laws in 2025
- Born: 7 April 1984 (age 42); Taplow, Berkshire, England
- Occupation: Comedian
- Years active: 2011–present
- Website: www.stuartlaws.com

Stuart Richard Walter Laws (born 7 April 1984) is a British comedian. He is the founder of Turtle Canyon Comedy, an independent production company, through which he has directed and produced stand-up specials for comedians including James Acaster, Nish Kumar and Fern Brady. As a stand-up performer, Laws has performed at the Edinburgh Festival Fringe annually since 2013 and has received critical recognition from publications including The Scotsman, Chortle, and The List.

== Career ==
=== Stand-up comedy ===
Laws began performing stand-up in the early 2010s and, in 2013, debuted his first solo Edinburgh Festival Fringe show, Absolutely Will Not Stop, Ever, Until You Are Dead. He has returned to the Fringe annually since, and has also performed at the Leicester Comedy Festival, where he was nominated for Best Show in 2021.

His 2023 Edinburgh show, later filmed as the special Is That Guy Still Going? for 800 Pound Gorilla Media, marked a shift toward more personal material, addressing grief, relationships and fatherhood. In 2024, he brought Stuart Laws Has to Be Joking? to the Fringe, a show exploring his recent autism diagnosis and it’s effect on his relationships. The show received a four-star review from The Scotsman, which described it as a "deliciously joke-dense" show by "one of the most skilled and likeable comics" at the festival. Chortle gave the show four stars, noting that Laws had taken his comedy "in a more personally honest direction".

=== Writing, directing and production ===
Laws founded the production company Turtle Canyon Comedy. His directing credits include stand-up specials for several British comedians:

- James Acaster: Hecklers Welcome (HBO)
- Nish Kumar: Your Power, Your Control (Netflix)
- Ivo Graham: Live From Bloomsbury Theatre
- Fern Brady: Autistic Bikini Queen (Amazon Prime Video)

=== The Debuts ===
In 2024, Laws created, directed and narrated the documentary The Debuts, which followed five comedians — Amy Gledhill, Sikisa, Josh Jones, Lily Phillips and Anthony DeVito — as they prepared for and performed their first full-hour shows at the 2022 Edinburgh Fringe. The documentary was covered in The Guardian as part of it’s reporting on the pressures of the Fringe festival. Laws also wrote a piece for The Scotsman reflecting on what he learned making the film.

=== Other work ===
Laws has written for BBC Radio 4. In 2021, he created Grave New World, a comedic mockumentary series about life after the COVID-19 pandemic, featuring an ensemble cast including James Acaster, Harriet Kemsley and Bobby Mair. The series was profiled in The Guardian. He has also contributed to Channel 4's digital comedy platform Mashed and created the Comedians Beer Mat Flipping Championship.

== Personal life ==
In 2024, during the Edinburgh Fringe, Laws was diagnosed with autism, which became a central theme of his subsequent work. He is in a relationship with American comedian Chloe Radcliffe.

Laws is colourblind.
