= Pierre Novellie =

South African Manx comedian

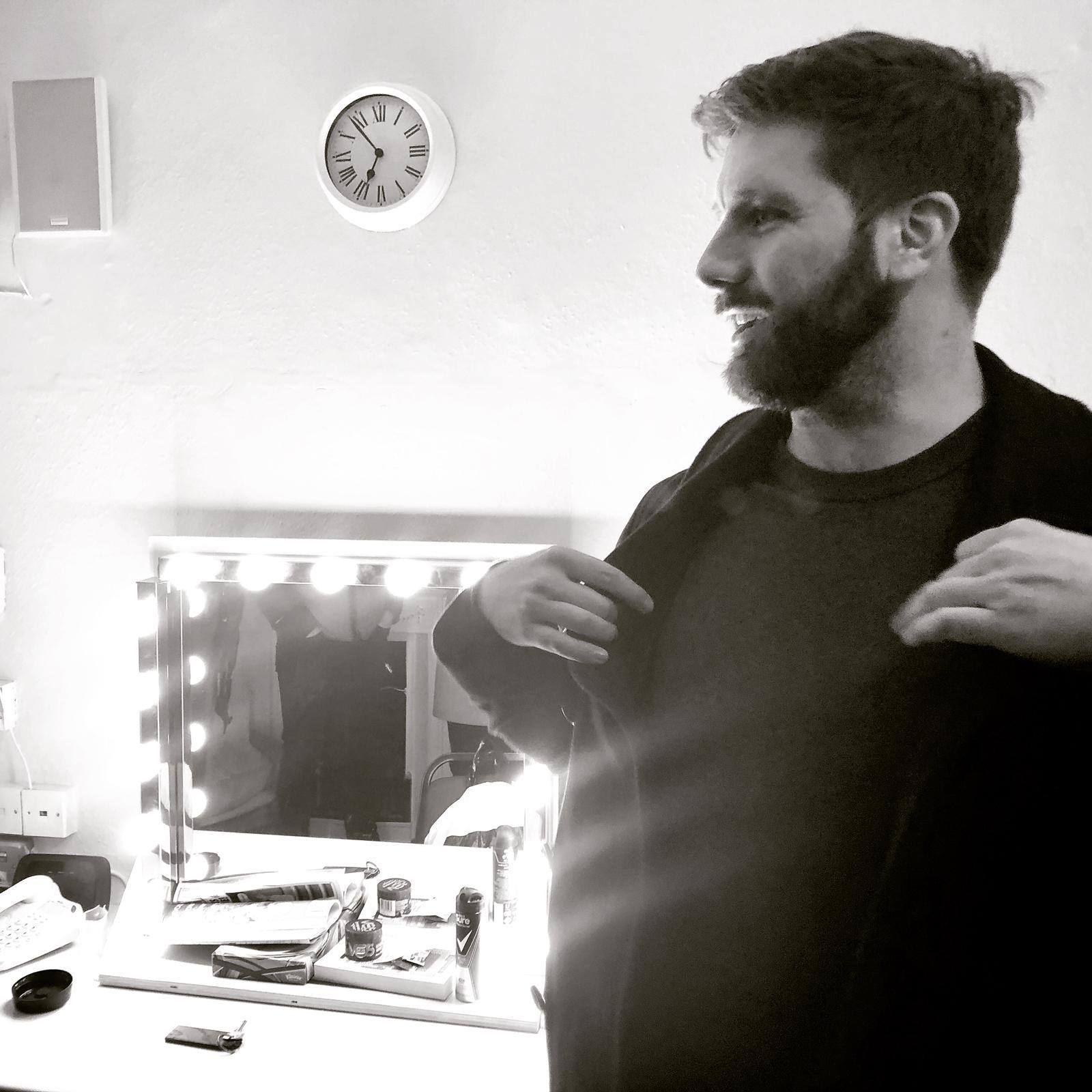
- Pierre Novellie backstage at the Garrick Theatre, 2019
- Born: 31 January 1991 (age 35); Johannesburg, South Africa
- Education: Corpus Christi College, Cambridge

Comedy career
- Medium: Stand-up, television, radio
- Website: www.pierrenovellie.com

Pierre Novellie (born 31 January 1991) is a South African-born British stand-up comedian, writer and podcaster, known for his analytical style of observational comedy.

Novellie has released a number of stand-up specials and is the author of Why Can't I Just Enjoy Things?: A Comedian's Guide to Autism (2024).

== Early life and education ==
Born in Johannesburg, South Africa, Novellie grew up in Port Soderick on the Isle of Man. He attended King William's College near Castletown, where he first developed an interest in performing.

In 2009, he began a degree in Anglo-Saxon, Norse and Celtic at Corpus Christi College, Cambridge. At Cambridge, he became involved with the Footlights, first as a member and later as vice president. It was at a Cambridge Footlights open-mic night that Novellie performed stand-up for the first time and met long-time comedy partner Phil Wang.

== Career ==
=== Stand-Up Comedy ===
Novellie first became interested in stand-up as a teenager and has named Eddie Izzard, Dave Chappelle, Stephen Colbert and John Oliver as early influences. He first began performing regularly while at Cambridge and at this time developed an hour-long show titled Nonsense. In the following years, he combined Footlights sketch and revue work with stand-up sets, appearing on joint-bill shows at the Edinburgh Fringe alongside comedians such as Fern Brady.

Novellie has supported Frank Skinner, Hal Cruttenden and Gary Delaney on tour and has performed with Dylan Moran. His stand-up has been described as "intellectual observational comedy".

==== Edinburgh Shows ====
- Pierre Novellie is Mighty Peter (2014)
- Pierre Novellie is Anxious Peter (2015)
- Pierre Novellie is Cool Peter (2016)
- Pierre Novellie (2017)
- See Novellie, Hear Novellie, Speak Novellie (2018)
- You're Expected to Care (2019)
- The South African Variant (Work In Progress) (2021)
- Why Can't I Just Enjoy Things? (2022)
- Why Are You Laughing (2023)
- Must We? (2024)
- You Sit There, I'll Stand Here (2025)

Specials

- Quiet Ones (2022)
- Why Can't I Just Enjoy Things? (2024)

=== Television ===
Novellie has been a recurring contributor to political and topical satire shows such as Mock the Week, ITV's Newzoids, The Mash Report and the revival of Spitting Image.

His television writing credits also include Adam Buxton's Shed of Christmas (2014), Chris Ramsey's Stand Up Central, and additional material for sitcom Outsiders (2016) and the panel-show The Island (2022).

Novellie's TV appearances include The Mash Report, BBC Three's Edinburgh Comedy Fest Live, All4/4OD Comedy Blaps series Taxi Gags and the sitcom Outsiders. He also appeared in the pilot of BBC Two's the Joke Thieves opposite Marcus Brigstocke.

In 2023, Novellie appeared on Dave's World's Most Dangerous Roads alongside fellow comedian and Cambridge graduate Phil Wang.

=== Radio ===
Novellie co-hosted the Frank Skinner Radio Show on Absolute Radio until its cancellation in 2024. He was also Skinner's guest when he hosted BBC Radio 4's The Rest Is History.. He has written for The Now Show.

In September 2025, the BBC announced that Novellie will host his own four-part series on BBC Radio 4, titled Why In The Name Of Pierre Novellie. Described as a comedic-essay show, it will use "masterful erudite bafflement" to explore topics ranging from history to sociology and everyday life.

=== Podcasts ===
Novellie co-hosted Frank Skinner's radio show spin-off podcast Frank Off the Radio with Frank Skinner until announcing his departure in December 2025. He co-hosts the podcasts Glue Factory alongside Milo Edwards, Olga Koch and Riley Quinn, and BudPod with Glenn Moore, the latter of whom took over from Phil Wang in 2025. Since July 2025, he also hosts Button Boys together with Glenn Moore and Sarah Keyworth.

From 2016 to 2018, he hosted a regular podcast called My Favourite Podcast.

He has also appeared as a guest on podcasts including Richard Herring's Leicester Square Theatre Podcast, Evil Genius with Russell Kane, and What Most People Think with Geoff Norcott.

=== Awards ===
Novellie won the Amused Moose Laugh Off in 2013 at the Edinburgh Fringe Festival. In 2014 he was nominated for industry website Chortle's Best Newcomer award and in 2016 was nominated for Best Club Comic at the Chortle Awards.

== Personal life ==
In 2020, Novellie was heckled by an audience member who said "You sound like me", clarifying, "I have Asperger's - I think you have Asperger's." After taking online autism tests, he was formally diagnosed in 2022.

Since then, Novellie has spoken openly about how autism has shaped his writing, citing it as the source of his "sensitive, finicky observational routines". He has also critiqued how popular media deprives autistic people of meaningful representation by portraying "autistic‑coded" characters rather than explicitly acknowledging neurodivergence.

Novellie's experience with a late autism diagnosis motivated him to write the book Why Can't I Just Enjoy Things? - subtitled A Comedian's Guide to Autism - which was published in 2024.
