= Benji Waterhouse =

English psychiatrist, comedian, and author (born 1984)

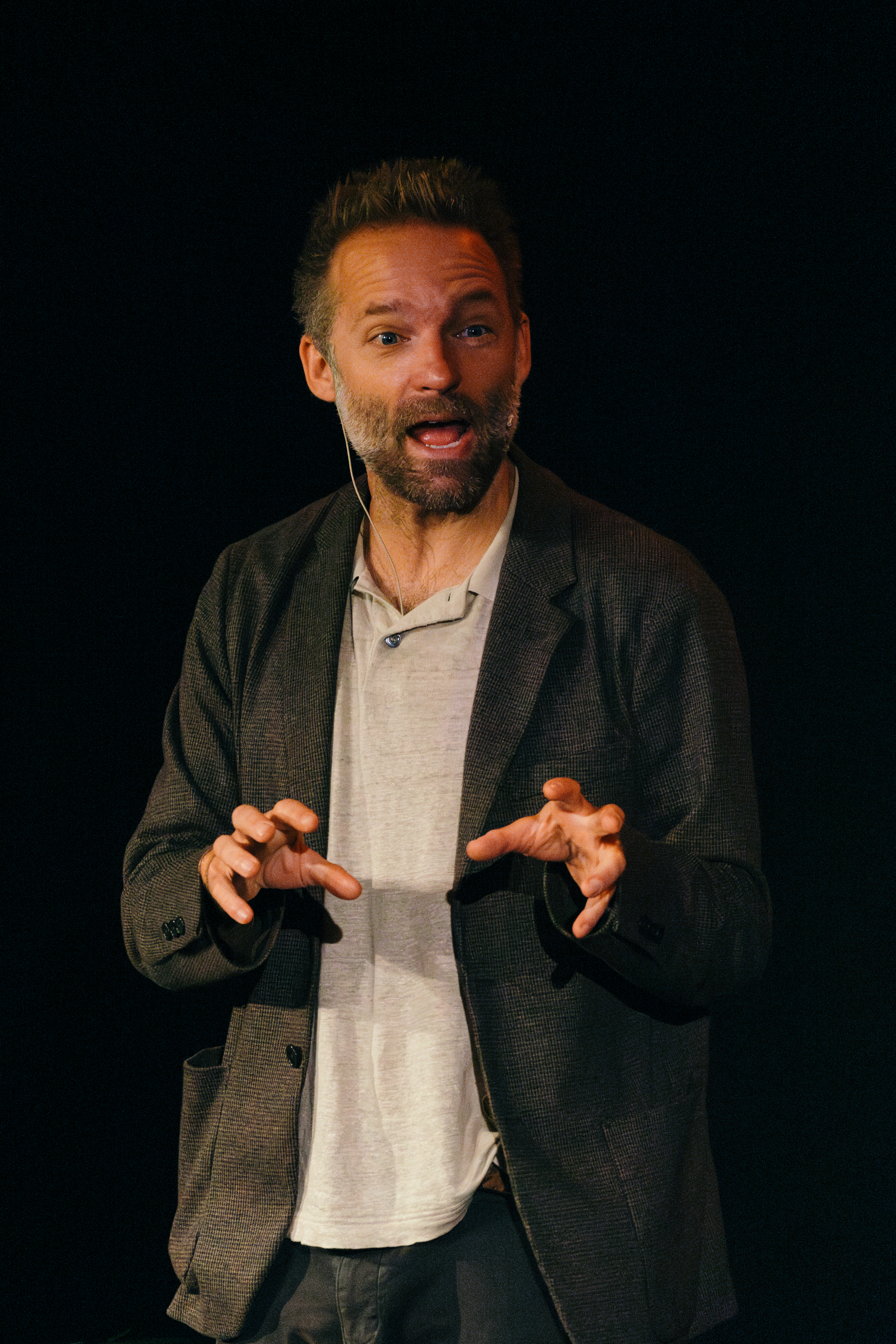
- Waterhouse at the 2025 Edinburgh Festival Fringe
- Born: October 30, 1984 (age 42); London, England
- Education: University of Leeds (MD)
- Occupations: Psychiatrist; Comedian; Author

Benjamin Waterhouse (born 30 October 1984) is an English consultant psychiatrist, stand-up comedian, and author known for his contributions to mental health care.

== Early life and education ==
Waterhouse grew up in Northumberland, England. He studied medicine at Leeds Medical school where he also graduated with a first-class honors degree in Medical Ethics.

== Career ==
=== Medical ===
After completing his medical degree, Waterhouse moved to London to specialize in psychiatry where he continues to work for the National Health Service (NHS). He has a special interest in psychedelics and helped to research psilocybin (magic mushrooms) for depression on a world-famous study featured in a BBC documentary. He was included in a list of 'Inspiring Psychiatrists' by the Royal College of Psychiatrists.

=== Comedy ===
Waterhouse is a stand-up comedian, which he began in 2014.

=== Writing ===
His debut memoir was You Don't Have to Be Mad to Work Here: A Psychiatrist's Life, published by Vintage. The book offers a detailed account of NHS psychiatry, characterized as a "fly on the padded wall" perspective, and is a candid representation of life within the National Health Service (NHS). It received a 5-star review from The Telegraph and was described by The Guardian as "humane, hilarious, eye-opening," drawing comparisons to Adam Kay's This Is Going to Hurt. The memoir was a Times Book of the Week and listed among The I Newspaper's funniest books of 2024. In an interview on Richard Herring's 'Leicester Square Theatre Podcast' Waterhouse revealed he is adapting his book for television with House Productions.

=== Media appearances ===
Waterhouse has discussed mental health on television with Sky News and Channel 5. He has also spoken on BBC Radio 4, BBC Radio 5 Live and Times Radio. He has appeared on popular podcasts such as Richard Herring's Leicester Square Theatre podcast, Healiners with Nihal Arthanayake and Dr Alex George's Stompcast. He has written for The Guardian, The Independent and the British Medical Journal (BMJ). He also appears regularly at book festivals. His comedy reels on Instagram have more than 3 million views.

== Personal life ==
Waterhouse resides in London.
