= Kiri Pritchard-McLean =

Welsh comedian and writer

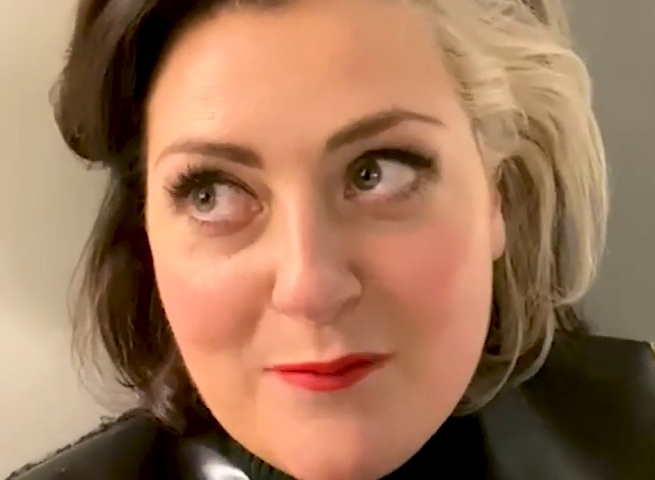
- Pritchard-McLean in 2021
- Born: Kiri Louise Pritchard-McLean; 6 November 1986 (age 39); Gloucester, England
- Years active: 2010–present

Kiri Louise Pritchard-McLean (born 6 November 1986) is a Welsh comedian and writer. She has performed for several consecutive years at the Edinburgh Festival Fringe and won five Chortle Awards.

== Career ==
Pritchard-McLean is the director and writer for sketch group Gein's Family Giftshop who were nominated for Best Newcomer in 2014 for the Edinburgh Comedy Award. As a sketch group they were also nominated for Chortle Awards in 2015. She took her debut show Hysterical Woman to the Edinburgh Festival Fringe in 2016. It transferred to the Soho Theatre for a run in June 2017. Her 2017 Edinburgh Fringe show was called Appropriate Adult and 2018's show was called Victim, Complex. Both shows were critically acclaimed and also transferred to Soho Theatre the following year.

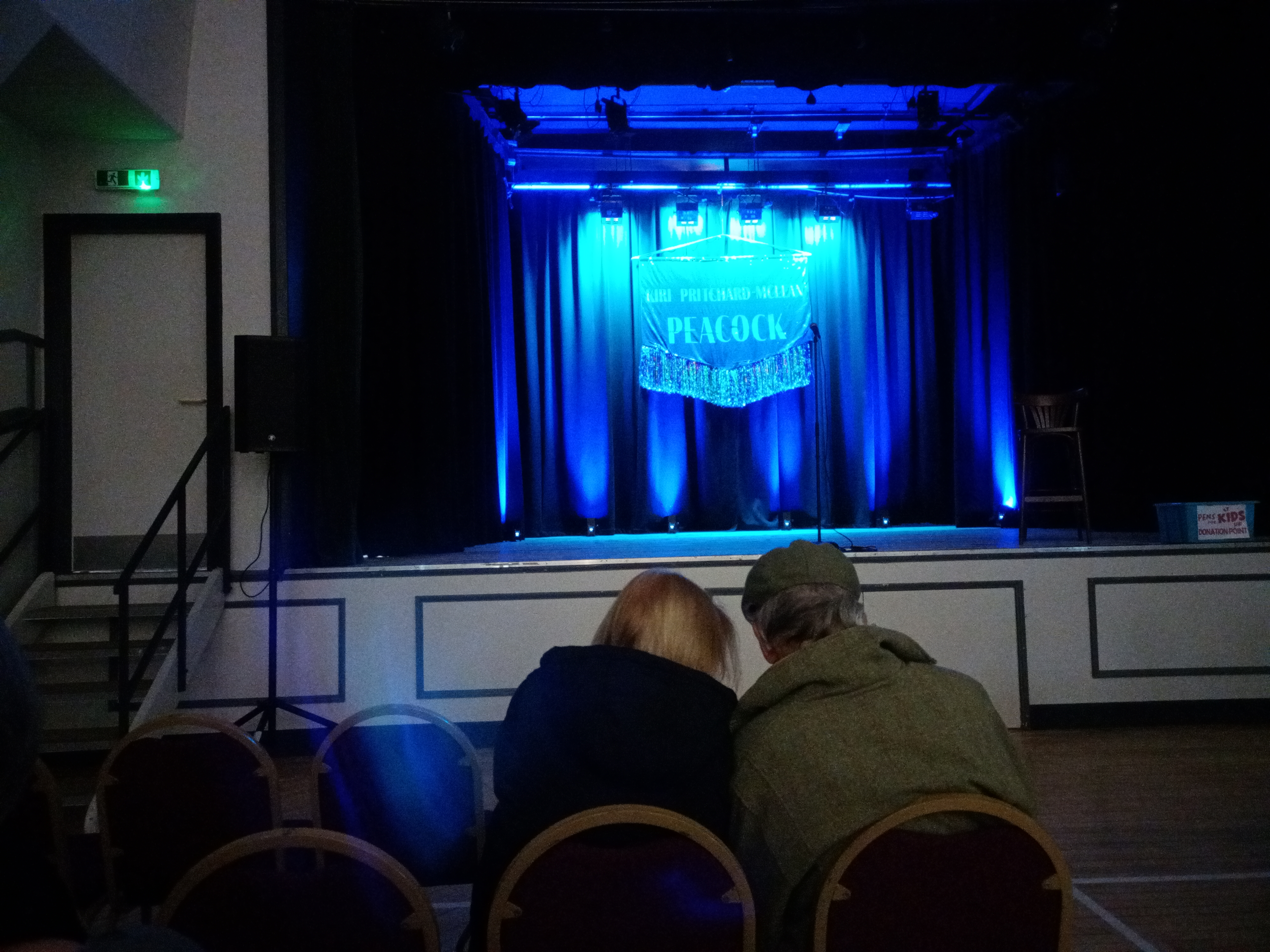
2024 was the Peacock Tour where she spoke about her three years of fostering (here in Melrose)

Pritchard-McLean has appeared on Have I Got News for You, Russell Howard's Stand Up Central on Comedy Central and ITV's Elevenish, Hypothetical, and Channel 4's 8 Out of 10 Cats Does Countdown as well as multiple appearances on the BBC Radio 4 shows The Now Show, The News Quiz and Elis James' State of the Nation. She is also co-host of the podcast All Killa No Filla along with fellow comedian Rachel Fairburn. In 2019 Pritchard-McLean became the host of the BBC Radio 4 Extra satirical sketch show Newsjack. In September 2019, she presented an edition of The News Quiz. In January 2020, she appeared as a panellist on Would I Lie to You? alongside David Mitchell and Jo Brand.

Her radio comedy pilot The Learners, a sitcom set in a Welsh-for-beginners class, premiered on 4 January 2021 on BBC Radio Wales. Written by Pritchard-McLean, it stars Tudur Owen, Janice Connolly, Mick Ferry, Kath Hughes, Oliver Pearce, Lisa Zahraand and Les Dennis. Her half-hour radio stand-up show Kiri Pritchard-McLean: Egg-sistential Crisis was released on BBC Radio 4 on 10 January 2020.

From June to August 2020, Pritchard-McLean presented a two-hour radio show on Saturday afternoons on BBC Radio Wales. She returned to the station in January 2021 to host a weekly Sunday afternoon show which she hosted until March 2024.

== Comedy awards ==
Pritchard-McLean won Best Compere and Best Club Comedian at the Chortle Awards in 2018, Best Compere and Breakthrough Act at the Chortle Awards in 2019, and Best Compere at the Chortle Awards in 2020. She was awarded the Caroline Aherne Bursary in 2020. The bursary, which was launched in memory of comedy star Caroline Aherne, is aimed at new writer/performers from the North of England and awards £5,000 to the successful applicant to enable them to receive support from the BBC. Pritchard-McLean will also receive mentorship from a BBC Comedy Commissioning Editor to develop a comedy script.

== Personal life ==
Born in Gloucester, Pritchard-McLean was the first daughter and last child of three. She was raised on a farm in Llanbedrgoch on the island of Anglesey, Wales.

Pritchard-McLean was previously in a relationship with comedian James Meehan from sketch group Gein's Family Gift Shop. Their relationship ended in 2017 with both using their experience of the break-up to create Edinburgh Fringe shows in 2018. Pritchard-McLean's show partly concerned the accusation that Meehan gaslit her during the relationship.

Pritchard-McLean and her partner are respite foster parents in Anglesey; her "Peacock" tour in 2024 was based on this.
