= Iszi Lawrence =

British broadcaster, comedian and author

Iszi Lawrence (born 7 June 1985) is a British broadcaster, comedian and author. She presents The Forum on the BBC World Service, and co-presents the podcast Your Place or Mine with Shaun Keaveny.

== Education ==
Lawrence attended Wychwood School in Oxford. She studied geography at the University of Bristol, graduating with first-class honours. She later studied a diploma in Creative Writing at the University of Oxford and graduated with this diploma.

== Broadcasting career ==
Lawrence was producer for the 2013 documentary film Rock and Roll's Greatest Failure: Otway the Movie.

In 2016, Lawrence began presenting for the BBC Radio 4 programme Making History, which explores historical topics. She joined the presenting team for the programme officially in 2018.

In 2021, Lawrence appeared in the TV series Royals: Keeping the Crown, which examined the successes of, and difficult events relating to, various royal families. Also in 2021, she appeared in the TV series The Lost Pirate Kingdom which examined real pirates in the Caribbean. Also in 2021, she appeared in the factual television series Ancient Apocalypse, as a history expert.

In 2022, Lawrence began co-presenting Your Place or Mine on BBC Radio 4 with Shaun Keaveny. In the same year, she appeared as a history expert in the factual television series U-Boat Wranglers.

As of 2023, Lawrence presented The Forum, an in-depth discussion programme on the BBC World Service's English-language service. She still presents the programme today.

Lawrence presents the British Museum's Membercast podcast, which explores topics connected to artifacts in the museum's collections.

== Comedy career ==
Lawrence was a semi-finalist in the BBC Radio 7 New Comedy Awards.

Lawrence has performed comedy in many countries, and in venues where comedy is not commonly performed, such as museums. However, she has also performed in conventional venues for comedy, for example she had a show Wotnot at the Edinburgh Fringe in 2012.

She appears regularly at the Lil Fat Comedy Club in Oxfordshire.

== Writing career ==
Lawrence is the author of several books, all aimed at children. Her book The Time Machine Next Door was launched at Waterstones in Reading in 2023. She has worked with the illustrator Rebecca Bagley for at least some of her books. Her series of books The Unstoppable Letty Pegg is a historical adventure series.

She runs workshops focussing on historical storywriting and history in general for children studying at Key Stage 2 and Key Stage 3.

== Personal life ==
Lawrence's family is multicultural, including people from Australia and Morocco.

She has a dark blue belt in Japanese-style jujutsu.
