= Catie Wilkins =

British comedian, writer, and podcaster

- Born: Catherine Joy Wilkins; 21 October 1980 (age 45)
- Spouse: Richard Herring (m. 2012)
- Children: 2

Comedy career
- Years active: 2004–present

Catherine Joy "Catie" Wilkins is a British comedian, writer, and podcaster.

== Career ==
Wilkins started her career in stand-up comedy in 2004 under the name Catie Wilkins. She appeared on ITV4’s Stand-Up Hero, and performed two solo hour shows at the Edinburgh Fringe: A Chip off the Odd Block (2011), which received a nomination from the NOTBBC Best Live Comedy Show, and Joy Is My Middle Name (2012) Wilkins's comedy persona is dry, sarcastic and deadpan and her comedy is observational. Her 2011 show focused on being raised in a quirky household and her attempts to be a normal adult, her second show focused on the irony of her middle name Joy. During her time as a stand-up she was invited to write for an episode of News Quiz, which was broadcast on BBC Radio 4.

Wilkins's first book, My Best Friend And Other Enemies, was published by Nosy Crow in 2012. It concerns a girl named Jessica whose best friend goes off with the cool new girl at school. Jessica uses her sense of humour and her cartoon drawing skills to win her back. The Independent listed My Best Friend among the ten best children's books for Christmas in 2012, with reviewer Marianne Levy calling it "properly funny". In 2013, it was also selected for the Bookbuzz reading programme list for Year 7 and Year 8 . A reviewer on The Guardian wrote that it was a "fantastic read" and "couldn't put the book down".

The series continued with My Brilliant Life and Other Disasters in 2013, which was reviewed in The Guardian as one that they would "recommend to anyone, especially fans of Jacqueline Wilson". This was followed by My School Musical And Other Punishments in 2014 and My Great Success And Other Failures in 2015. Catherine's latest book, When Good Geeks Go Bad, was published in 2019.

In 2018, she returned to comedy in co-presenting the podcast Drunk Women Solving Crime with screenwriter Hannah George and writer/comedian Taylor Glenn, produced by Amanda Redman. The show is hosted by Acast and reached number 4 in the podcast chart when it launched in September 2018. Each week the three co-presenters are joined by a different female guest from the world of comedy, media and broadcasting, who is invited to test their detective skills whilst getting drunk. Guests so far have included Katherine Ryan, Jenny Éclair and London Hughes. Each episode is divided into three sections; the first section involves the guest sharing their own story of experiencing a crime, the second section involves one of the co-presenters telling a true crime story and the other presenters and guest attempting to solve it whilst drinking, and the third section involves the presenters and guest solving a listener-submitted crime. The podcast has also been recorded live at the Pleasance Theatre Although there are several true crime podcasts that involve alcohol, Drunk Women is the first true crime podcast to combine drinking with a special guest whilst actively trying to ‘solve' a crime in a comedy quiz style format.

== Personal life ==
Wilkins met fellow comedian Richard Herring in 2006, and they married in 2012. They had their first child, a daughter, in February 2015, and a son in October 2017.

Wilkins is an atheist; she has written articles for New Humanist magazine, and contributed to the anthology book The Atheist's Guide to Christmas published in 2009.

== Books ==
- My Best Friend and Other Enemies (Nosy Crow, 2012) ISBN 978-0857630957
- My Brilliant Life and Other Disasters (Nosy Crow, 2013) ISBN 978-0857631596
- My School Musical And Other Punishments (Nosy Crow, 2014) ISBN 978-0857633095
- My Great Success And Other Failures (Nosy Crow, 2015) ISBN 978-0857634900
- When Good Geeks Go Bad (Nosy Crow, 2019) ISBN 978-1788000598
- The Weird Friends Fan Club (Nosy Crow, 2019) ISBN 978-1788005364
