= Greg Jenner =

British author and historian (born 1982)

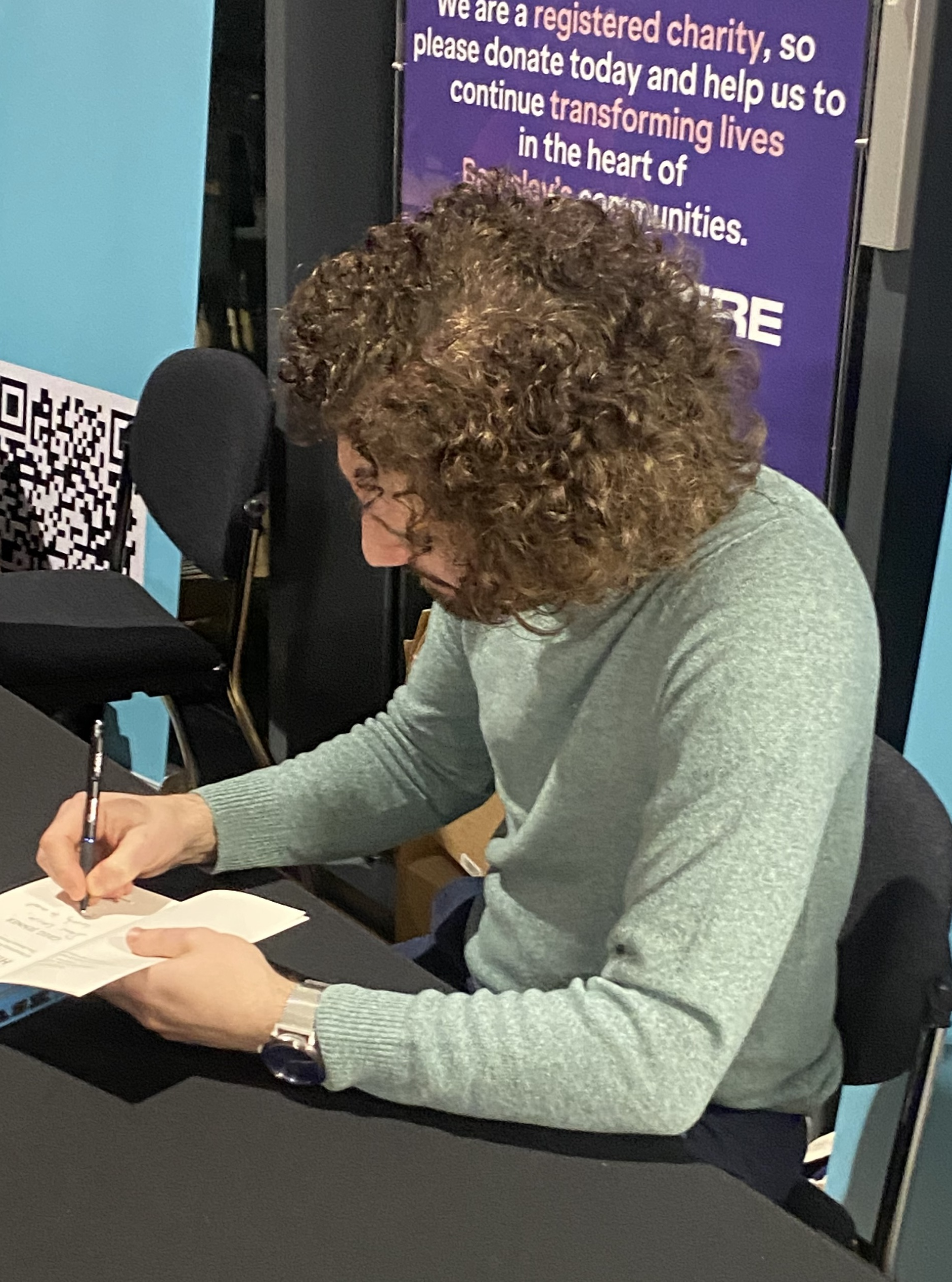
- Jenner in 2026
- Born: 10 September 1982 (age 43); Kent, England
- Education: University of York: (BA in Archaeology and History, 2004); (MA in Medieval Studies, 2006)
- Occupations: Author, Public Historian
- Known for: Horrible Histories (2009 TV series); You’re Dead To Me podcast
- Honours: Fellow of the Royal Historical Society

Greg Jenner (born 10 September 1982) is a British author and public historian with a particular interest in communicating history through pop culture and humour.

== Early life ==
Jenner studied for a History and Archaeology BA and a Medieval Studies MA at the University of York.

== Career ==
Jenner has worked as an historical consultant on the Horrible Histories books and television shows. Jenner has credited the success of Horrible Histories to a non-patronising approach to children’s television.

Jenner has written for GQ magazine and has appeared as a guest on Richard Herring's interview podcasts and on the Art Detective podcast. He also featured on the BBC Radio 4 programme Great Lives, discussing Gene Kelly.

He has appeared more than once as a guest on QI spin-off podcast No Such Thing as a Fish. and has made appearances on the Simon Mayo and the Steve Wright shows on BBC Radio 2.

Jenner featured as an expert on the BBC2 television programme Inside Versailles, as well as for the Independent newspaper, discussing historical accuracy in television programmes.

Jenner has been made an Honorary Research Associate at Royal Holloway, University of London.

Since 2019, Jenner has presented a BBC Sounds podcast, You’re Dead To Me. Each episode sees him talk to both a historian and comedian about a historical figure or time period. As well as the streamed edition, a radio-edit version is broadcast on BBC Radio 4. In February 2023 and 2024 the show won the Best Radio Entertainment Show category at the Comedy.co.uk Awards.

In 2020, Jenner launched Homeschool History, an educational history podcast aimed at children, in response to the Coronavirus lockdown whereby children who were unable to attend school. Homeschool History ran for two series and was broadcast on BBC Radio 4.

In 2021 Jenner launched an Audible Original podcast A Somewhat Complete History of Sitting Down.

== Publications ==
- A Million Years In A Day: A Curious History of Daily Life, From The Stone Age To The Phone Age (2015, Weidenfeld & Nicolson; ISBN 9780297869788)
- Dead Famous: An Unexpected History of Celebrity from Bronze Age to Silver Screen (2020, Weidenfeld & Nicolson; ISBN 9780297869818)
- Ask A Historian: 50 Surprising Answers to Things You Always Wanted to Know (2021, Orion; ISBN 9781474618625)
- You Are History: From The Alarm Clock To The Toilet, The Amazing History of The Things You Use Every Day (2022, Welbeck Publishing Group; ISBN 9781406395679)
- Totally Chaotic History: Ancient Egypt Gets Unruly! (2024, Walker Books; ISBN 9781406395655)
- Totally Chaotic History: Roman Britain Gets Rowdy! (2024, Walker Books; ISBN 9781406395662)

== Personal life ==
Jenner is half French on his mother's side. He is an avid fan of heavy metal and alternative rock, and loves Thrice, the band. Jenner is a supporter of Tottenham Hotspur. He is teetotal.
