= Rachel Fairburn =

British comedian

- Born: 16 September 1982 (age 44); Harpurhey, Manchester, England
- Occupation: Comedian
- Years active: 2008–present

Rachel Fairburn is an English comedian. She was born in Harpurhey, Manchester and attended St Monica's High School. She is co-host of the hit comedy podcast All Killa No Filla along with fellow comedian Kiri Pritchard-McLean. All Killa No Filla has been named one of the top eight true crime podcasts of 2018 by The Independent, Esquire 's number two 'Best True Crime Podcast' in 2018 and one of the best podcast of 2018 by The Guardian. Time cited their podcast as an example of how female comedians are talking about their experiences in the #MeToo era. Fairburn and Pritchard-McLean launched their podcast in 2014.

Fairburn has been working as a comedian since 2008. The Daily Telegraph named her one of the best comedians at the 2018 Edinburgh Festival Fringe. Fairburn has appeared on the BBC's 'Funny from the Fringe', the 'Evil Genius with Russell Kane' and 'Breaking the News' on BBC Radio Scotland. Before she was a comedian, she worked full-time in the John Rylands Library. In October 2026 Fairburn was announced as the first ambassador of Manchester based mental health charity The Creative Living Centre.
