= Cally Beaton =

British comedian and television executive

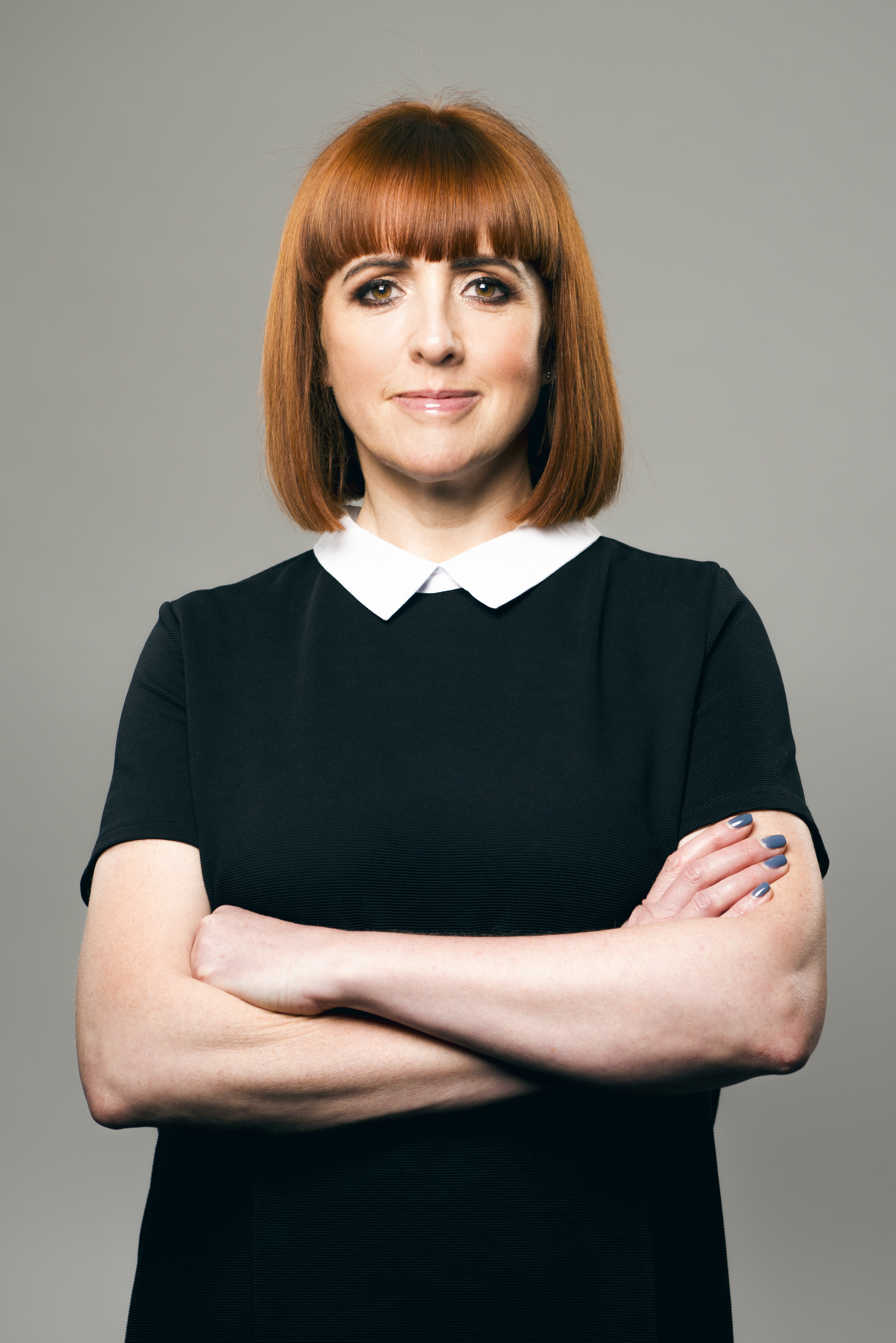
- Born: 17 March 1969 (age 57)
- Education: Goldsmiths
- Occupations: comedian, podcaster, speaker
- Website: http://callybeaton.com

Caroline Beaton (born 17 March 1969) is a British stand-up comedian, podcaster, writer and former TV executive.

== Early life ==
Beaton grew up in Dorset, the daughter of two teachers and was the only girl in an all boys school. She studied English and Drama at Goldsmiths and is a Master Practitioner in neuro-linguistic programming.

== Career ==
Beaton worked as a TV executive at MTV and Carlton TV responsible for shows including South Park and SpongeBob SquarePants and as a senior vice president at Viacom. While working at Comedy Central in 2015 she began performing as a stand-up comedian. According to her website:

It was while working for Comedy Central that Cally was nudged into the sphere of performance after a chance conversation with the late, great Joan Rivers, then 81, and so it was that as a 45 year old single parent, Cally first took to the stage.

Beaton has appeared as a guest on BBC Two's The Apprentice: You're Fired, a panellist on BBC Two's QI, Richard Osman’s House of Games, BBC NI's The Blame Game and Live at the Apollo Christmas Special. She has been heard on BBC Radio 4's The Museum of Curiosity, The Unbelievable Truth, Radio 4's The Now Show and on BBC Radio 6, Times Radio, Radio 5 Live and BBC Radio London.

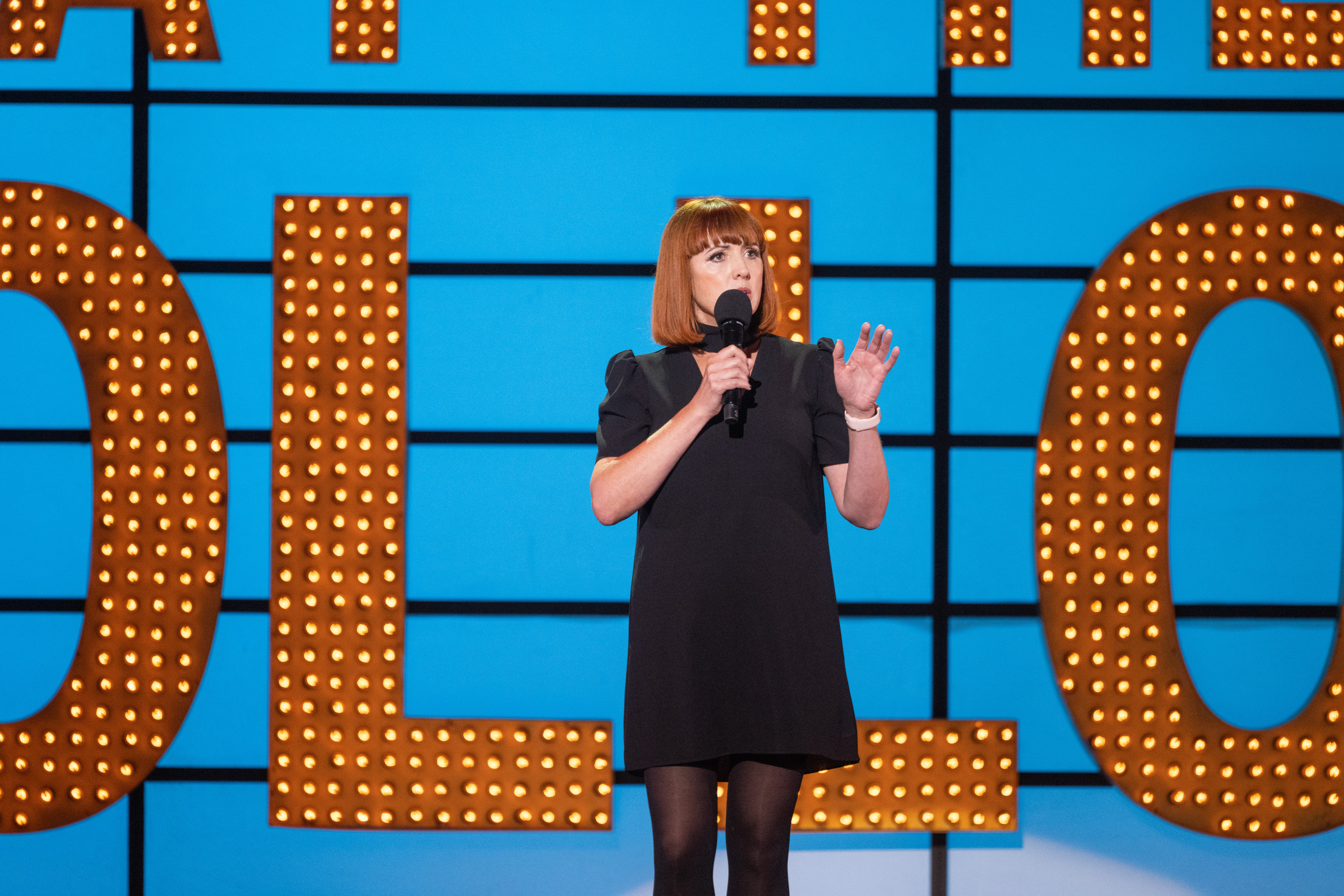
Cally Beaton performing at Live at the Apollo Christmas Special

At the Edinburgh Festival Fringe in 2016, she gained 4-star reviews, together with comedian Catherine Bohart. For her solo show at the 2017 festival, Super Cally Fragile Lipstick, she gained further 4-star reviews and won the Piccadilly Comedy Club "New Comedian Of The Year" 2017/18.

Her 2019 Edinburgh Fringe solo show Invisible, inspired by the statement by Yann Moix that women over 50 years of age were invisible to him, was listed as unmissable by the Daily Express and received four-star reviews from The Scotsman and Funny Women. Beaton was on Episode 19 of the 2019 series of Richard Herring's Edinburgh Fringe Podcast. She featured on the Daily Mirror's and the Evening Standard's best jokes lists.

In Spring 2021, Beaton launched Namaste Motherf**kers, a podcast that mixes the genres of comedy, self-help and business. And in 2025 her debut book of the same name, became a Sunday Times Top 10 Bestseller.

In Spring 2023, Beaton appeared on Countdown in Dictionary Corner.

Beaton has also written for The Guardian and the Financial Times.

== Personal life ==
Beaton has a son, who is autistic, and a daughter. Beaton moved to Amsterdam in the 1990s, as her then husband was Dutch. She became fluent in the language, and she owns property in Amsterdam and London.

After her divorce, she dated fellow comedian Mark Steel in 2023.
