= Esther Manito =

British comedian

- Born: Essex
- Known for: Stand-up comedy
- Notable work: Notallmen, Crusade
- Awards: Leicester Comedy Festival, Best Show Award 2021
- Website: www.esthermanito.co.uk

Esther Manito is a British comedian.

== Early life ==
Esther Manito was born to an English mother and Lebanese father in Saffron Walden, Essex. She studied for a BSc in Politics at London Metropolitan University, followed by a Masters in Communications.

== Career ==
=== Early career ===
Esther Manito began performing stand-up around 2016 following a six-week writing course at London's Camden Comedy School. She was the first female comedian to perform at Dubai Opera House, a regional finalist in 2017's Funny Women Awards, and was a finalist in the 2019 Arab British Center's Award for Culture.

=== Comedy Shows ===
She debuted at the Edinburgh Fringe with her show Crusade in 2019. Her second full length show, #notallmen, won Best Show at Leicester Comedy Festival 2021. She also performed #notallmen at the Edinburgh Fringe in 2022. She debuted at Live at the Apollo in December 2021. She has appeared on podcasts including Evil Genius with Russell Kane, and Parenting Hell with Josh Widdicombe and Rob Beckett.

=== Podcast ===
In 2021, alongside her friend Lily Phillip's, Manito launched her own podcast titled Ghastly Women.

== Personal life ==
Esther Manito lives in Essex with her English husband, her father and her two children.
