= Carey Marx =

British stand up comedian (born 1966)

- Born: March 1966 (age 59–60)
- Occupation: Stand-up comedian

Carey Marx (born March 1966) is a British stand-up comedian.

== Career ==
Marx has been performing regularly all over the U.K. comedy circuit for several years, including Komedia, The Comedy Store and Jongleurs. He has had numerous television appearances including Comedy Cuts, BBC Breakfast and Loose Women and has gained international recognition through winning Best International Show at the New Zealand Comedy Festival (2009). He has also had several solo shows to appear at other comedy festivals including Leicester Comedy Festival and the Edinburgh Festival Fringe.

He is represented by Glorious Management.

== Solo shows ==
- Albino Hunter (2003)
- Marry Me (2005)
- White Night (2006)
- Onomatopoeia Society III (2007)
- Sincerity Aside (2007)
- Caryness (2008–2009)
- The Doom Gloom Boom (2009)
- Scoundrel (2010)
