= Sikisa =

English comedian and immigration lawyer

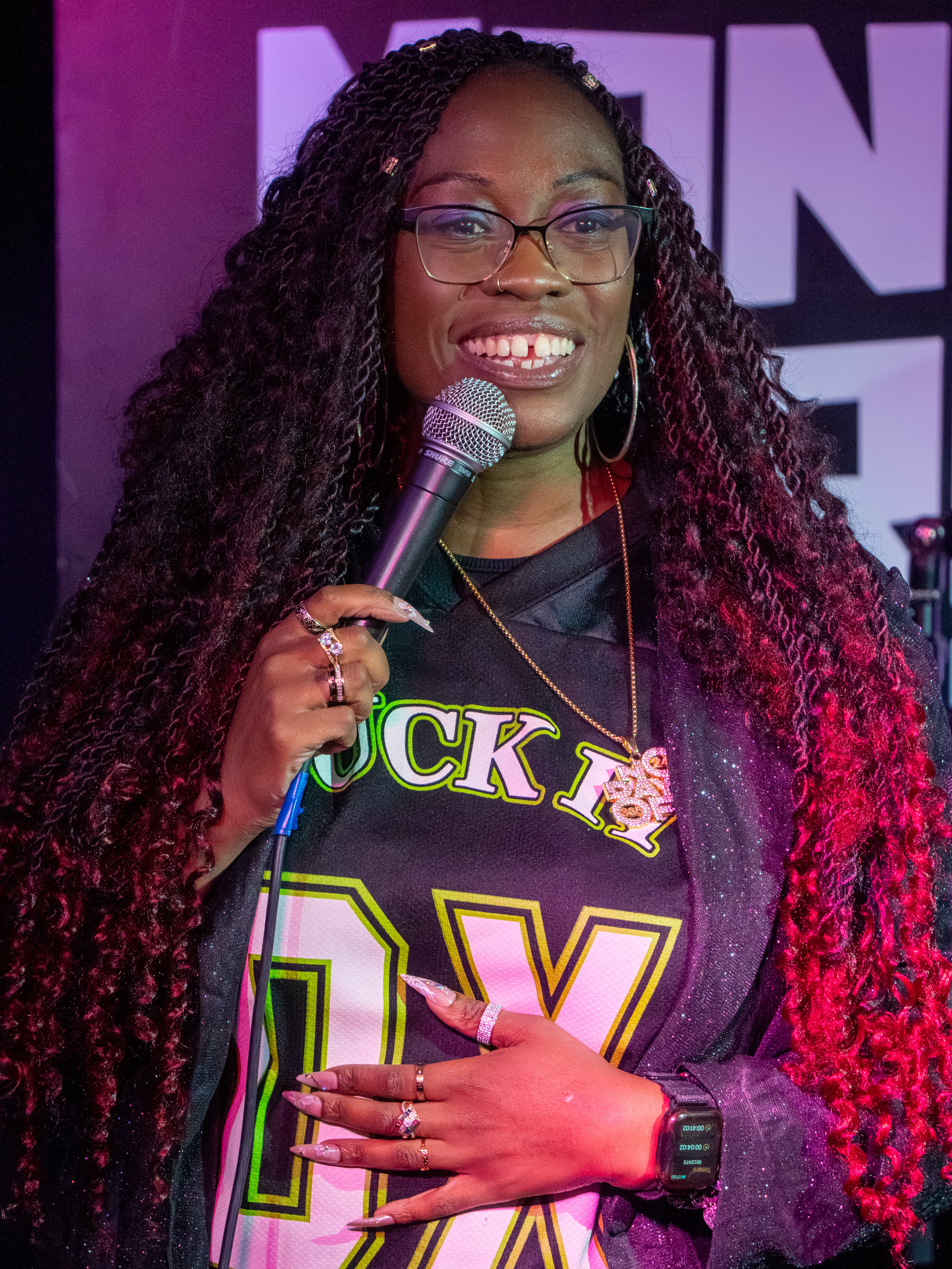
- Sikisa at the 2025 Edinburgh Festival Fringe
- Born: Sikisa Bostwick-Barnes; London, England
- Education: Kingston University
- Occupations: Immigration lawyer and stand-up comedian

Sikisa Bostwick-Barnes, known mononymously as Sikisa, is an English immigration lawyer and stand-up comedian.

Her humour often incorporates topics of race, class, and discrimination.

== Career ==
She studied law at Kingston University. While studying for her law degree, she worked behind the bar at a comedy club in Stockwell, and following the suggestion of her boss she began doing stand-up.

She was a finalist for the BBC New Comedy Award finalist in 2017 where she competed under her initial stage name of Twix.

She made her debut at the Edinburgh Festival Fringe in 2022 with her show "Life of the Party", which was described by Fest Magazine as "a high-spirited call to celebrate life and love yourself from a comedian who knows how to have fun".

== Personal life ==
She was born in London but spent her early years in Barbados, where she has family roots.
