= Fern Brady =

Scottish comedian (born 1986)

- Born: Fern Marie Brady; 26 May 1986 (age 40); Bathgate, West Lothian, Scotland
- Education: University of Edinburgh (BA)
- Occupations: Comedian; podcaster; writer
- Years active: 2010–present
- Website: fernbradycomedian.com

Fern Marie Brady (born 26 May 1986) is a Scottish comedian, podcaster and writer.

Brady was diagnosed as autistic in 2021. She has been active within the field of autism education since learning of her neurodivergence. She has written about life as an autistic person in her 2023 memoir Strong Female Character.

== Early life ==
Brady was born in Bathgate, West Lothian, where she grew up. She went to school at St. Kentigern's Academy, Blackburn in West Lothian. She is of Irish descent, has family roots in County Donegal, and grew up within the Catholic Church in Scotland. Her father worked for a truck company, and her mother worked at Tesco.

== Career ==
While at the University of Edinburgh, Brady was editor of The Student, a weekly newspaper produced by students. To finance her university studies, she worked as a stripper. She graduated with a Bachelor of Arts in English Literature. Following university, Brady originally trained to become a journalist, although she had been thinking about becoming a stand-up comedian since 2006. In 2009, she was an intern at Fest Magazine, a free magazine covering the Edinburgh Festival. One of her assignments there was to write an article about a comedy critic trying stand-up. Brady describes the experience as "the push I needed to realise it was what I wanted to do". Her first professional gig was in May 2010.

She reached the finals of "So You Think You're Funny" at the 2011 Edinburgh Festival Fringe, where she was placed joint third; the finals of the Piccadilly Comedy Club new act competition in 2012, and the Hackney Empire New Act of the Year in 2013. She has appeared on 8 Out of 10 Cats in 2014, Seann Walsh's Late Night Comedy Spectacular, The Alternative Comedy Experience in 2014, BBC Radio 4's The News Quiz, series 3 of Live from the BBC in 2018, series 14 of Live at the Apollo in 2018 and on series 3 of Frankie Boyle's New World Order in 2019. She has written for The Guardian since 2021.

In 2020, Brady and fellow comedian Alison Spittle started a podcast for the BBC called Wheel of Misfortune which Brady co-presented until 2023, being replaced by Kerry Katona. In 2026, Brady reunited with Spittle to launch a new podcast called Ignore That Feeling.

In late 2021, Brady co-presented the Dave travelogue British as Folk alongside fellow comedians Ivo Graham and Darren Harriott. In January 2022, Brady began a 25-date tour of her new show, Autistic Bikini Queen. In June 2022, Brady was confirmed to be a contestant in the 14th series of Taskmaster, which started airing in September 2022. Brady described this year, when filming Taskmaster, as the "nicest ... of [her] life" and the show as "accidentally ... a really good format for autistic people" because, unlike panel shows, Taskmaster "is very clearly laid out. Every day, you are going to do nine tasks and you are just interacting with one other person". The comedian saw her time on Taskmaster as more worthwhile than doing a documentary on autism because, through it, she believed she could reach more autistic people and "people [would] see a happy positive depiction of neurodiversity". The show also helped her become more accepting of herself as an autistic person.

In 2023, her memoir, Strong Female Character, was published by Brazen. Brady won the non-fiction section of the 2023 Books Are My Bag Readers' Awards, and the non-fiction category in the inaugural Nero book awards.

== Personal life ==
Brady is bisexual. In 2023, Brady entered into a civil partnership with her long-term boyfriend Conor, for "coma reasons".

Brady was misdiagnosed with obsessive–compulsive disorder (OCD) at the age of 16, and revealed in 2021 that she has been diagnosed as autistic. A reason Brady is glad to be autistic is because it meant she was less influenced by her peers:

... I would rather be an autistic woman than a neurotypical one. I always felt like women seem to look left and right at what other women are doing and are influenced by their peers. If I’d have been more influenced by my peers, I don’t know what I would have ended up doing.

She has also said, "an autistic brain [can] provide an escape route from the traditional paths laid out for women".
