= List of Mock the Week panellists =

Mock the Week is a panel show that was broadcast on BBC Two between 2005 and 2022, and on TLC since 2026. The show aired 234 episodes in its original release.

Hosted by Dara Ó Briain, the show features a series of rounds where panellists satirised current events. The show features two teams of three, composed of regular panellists and various guest performers. Hugh Dennis appeared in every one of the original 21 series, while other regulars included Frankie Boyle, Rory Bremner, Andy Parsons, Russell Howard, Chris Addison and Angela Barnes, who all featured for the entirety of at least one series.

In 2026, the show was rebooted by Freeview channel TLC for Series 22, with Rhys James announced as a regular panellist.

== Number of appearances per panellist ==
Of the show's original run aired on BBC Two of 234 episodes from Series 1–21, 196 episodes count towards the appearance table below. This figure does not include the 2011 Comic Relief special, nor any of the show's Christmas specials and compilation episodes.

Although TLC marketed their first series of the show as "Season One", the table below lists this as "Series 22", and onwards for any further series produced.

As of 25 October 2026, S24 E07, episode 215

Name	Series																								Total
Name	1	2	3	4	5	6	7	8	9	10	11	12	13	14	15	16	17	18	19	20	21	22	23	24	Total
Dara Ó Briain	Host																								215
Frankie Boyle	Main																								54
Rory Bremner	Main																								10
Hugh Dennis	Main																					3	2	3	204
Linda Smith	2																								2
Jeremy Hardy	1	1																							2
John Oliver	3	4																							7
Jo Brand	3	2	1																						6
Andy Parsons	2	4	Main																						116
Mark Steel	1		1																						2
Al Murray	1	1																							2
David Mitchell	2	2		1	2	2	2																		11
Gina Yashere		2	2	1	1	1	1																		8
Sue Perkins		1																							1
Sandi Toksvig		1																							1
Greg Proops		1				1																			2
Clive Anderson			1																						1
Russell Howard			4	Main																		1		0	54
Ed Byrne			2	1	3	3	2	1	4	4	2	5	5	5	5	6	6	6	6	5	2	5	2	3	83
Robin Ince			1																						1
Mark Watson			2	2	2	1		1			1														9
Jon Culshaw			2																						2
Ian Stone			1	1																					2
Adam Hills			1		1	1	1			1															5
Shaparak Khorsandi				1																					1
Fred MacAulay				1		1	1																		3
Rhod Gilbert				1	1		1																		3
Jo Caulfield				1	3						2														6
Michael McIntyre					2	3																			5
Jan Ravens					1																				1
Lauren Laverne					1	1																			2
Jimmy Tingle					1																				1
Ben Norris					2		1																		3
Fiona Allen					1																				1
Alun Cochrane					1		1			1	2														5
Lucy Porter						2	1																		3
Stephen K. Amos						1																			1
Greg Davies						1	1			2	2														6
Danielle Ward						1																			1
Zoe Lyons						1	1		1	1	1		2	2	2	3	2				1	1		2	20
Stewart Francis						1	3	1	2	3	1	1													12
Adam Bloom						1																			1
Frank Skinner							1																		1
Tom Stade							1																		1
Seann Walsh							1		1	2		1													5
Holly Walsh							1	1		1		2	1	1	2										9
Jack Whitehall							1	1	3	1															6
Sarah Millican							1	1																	2
Milton Jones							1	2	4	5	6	4	4	4	4	4	4	3	2	2	1	2	1	1	54
Patrick Kielty								1	1																2
Chris Addison								2	6	Main															34
John Bishop								1																	1
Andrew Maxwell								1																	1
Andi Osho								1	2	1	1														5
Kevin Bridges								1	1																2
Diane Morgan									1	1															2
Nik Rabinowitz									1																1
Jarred Christmas									1																1
Micky Flanagan									2	5	1														8
Miles Jupp									2	2	1	3	1	1	2	1									13
Russell Kane									1				1												2
Carl Donnelly									1	1	1														3
Ava Vidal										2	1	1													4
Nathan Caton										1	1	1		1											4
Simon Evans										1															1
Gary Delaney											3	4	4	2	3	2									18
Marcus Brigstocke											1														1
Josh Widdicombe											4	5	5	6	3										23
Chris Ramsey											1	1											1		3
Joe Wilkinson											1														1
Katherine Ryan											1	2	2	2								2			9
Hal Cruttenden												3	1			1									5
Rob Beckett												3	5	5	7										20
Alistair McGowan												1													1
Romesh Ranganathan												1	6	2	2	1									12
Sara Pascoe													3	3	2							4	2	3	17
Angela Barnes													1		2	6	6	5	6	7	Main	4	1	3	46
Susan Calman													1												1
Tiff Stevenson													1	1	2	1	1	1							7
James Acaster													1	4	4	5	3				1				18
Matt Forde														2											2
Ellie Taylor														2	1	1	1	1				1			7
Ed Gamble														4	5	6	7	7	7				1		37
Nish Kumar															2	7	3	1			1				14
Dane Baptiste															1										1
Rhys James															1	3	4	5	7	8	3	Main			50
John Robins															2										2
Elis James															1										1
Loyiso Gola															1										1
Ivo Graham															1	1				1				1	4
Tez Ilyas																1	1								2
Kerry Godliman																2	3	4							9
Tom Allen																2	4	4	3						13
Glenn Moore																1	1	2	2	3	2	3	2	3	19
Felicity Ward																1				1					2
Darren Harriott																	1			1					2
London Hughes																	1							0	1
Ari Eldjárn																	1								1
Desiree Burch																	1								1
Suzi Ruffell																	1	1							2
Deborah Frances-White																	1								1
Larry Dean																	1	1							2
Rachel Parris																	1	1							2
Geoff Norcott																	1								1
Sindhu Vee																		2							2
Olga Koch																		2							2
Maisie Adam																		2	6	7			1	0	16
Sophie Duker																		2	1						3
Eshaan Akbar																		1	1	1					3
Nigel Ng																		1	1						2
Mark Simmons																		1	1			1			3
Chris Washington																		1							1
Rosie Jones																		1							1
Athena Kugblenu																			1	1					2
Sukh Ojla																			2						2
Thanyia Moore																			1						1
Ria Lina																			2	1	1	1			5
Laura Lexx																			1	2	1		1	1	6
Catherine Bohart																			1	1					2
Michael Odewale																			2						2
Ahir Shah																			1	4	2	3	1	3	14
Maff Brown																			1						1
Alasdair Beckett-King																				3	2	2		1	8
Robin Morgan																				1					1
Kae Kurd																				1					1
Evelyn Mok																				1					1
Sarah Keyworth																				1		2	1	2	6
Jen Brister																				1	1				2
Emily Lloyd-Saini																				1					1
Josh Pugh																					1		1		2
Sean McLoughlin																					1	1			2
Lou Sanders																						1			1
Emmanuel Sonubi																						1		1	2
Janine Harouni																						1	1	2	4
Scott Bennett																						1	1	2	4
Michelle Wolf																							1		1
Finlay Christie																								1	1
Neil Delamere																								2	2
Harriet Kemsley																								1	1
