= List of Mock the Week episodes =

Mock the Week is a British satirical panel show that premiered on BBC Two on 5 June 2005, and aired on BBC Two from 2005 until 2022, and on TLC since 2026. As of 1 November 2026, 256 episodes of Mock the Week have aired, including twenty specials, concluding the twenty-third series.

Each episode of the BBC Two era of the show ran for approximately 30 minutes in length, while the length of the TLC era increased to approximately 45 minutes each (not including advertisements).

All episodes are hosted by Dara Ó Briain, joined by two teams of three panellists. The first two series had Hugh Dennis and Frankie Boyle as regular panellists on one side, and Rory Bremner as a regular on the other. Bremner left after series 2 and was replaced by Andy Parsons, who was a regular from series 3 to 14; he was not replaced as a regular afterwards. Russell Howard became a regular panellist from series 4 to 9. Boyle left after series 7; Chris Addison took his seat permanently from the second half of series 10 until the first half of series 12, after which his seat once again became a guest slot. Dennis was the only regular panellist throughout the original 17-year and 21-series run on BBC Two. Rhys James is the sole regular panelist for the TLC episodes.

Three further series have been commissioned, to air throughout 2027.

== Series overview ==
Series	Team 1 regular(s)	Team 2 regular(s)	Episodes	Originally released		
Series	Team 1 regular(s)	Team 2 regular(s)	Episodes	First released	Last released	Network
1	Hugh Dennis and Frankie Boyle	Rory Bremner	6	5 June 2005	10 July 2005	BBC Two
2	Hugh Dennis and Frankie Boyle	Rory Bremner	7	20 January 2006	2 March 2006	BBC Two
3	Hugh Dennis and Frankie Boyle	Andy Parsons	7	14 September 2006	26 October 2006	BBC Two
4	Hugh Dennis and Frankie Boyle	Russell Howard and Andy Parsons	6	11 January 2007	15 February 2007	BBC Two
5	Hugh Dennis and Frankie Boyle	Russell Howard and Andy Parsons	12	12 July 2007	27 September 2007	BBC Two
6	Hugh Dennis and Frankie Boyle	Russell Howard and Andy Parsons	13	10 July 2008	23 December 2008	BBC Two
7	Hugh Dennis and Frankie Boyle	Russell Howard and Andy Parsons	13	9 July 2009	22 December 2009	BBC Two
8	Hugh Dennis	Russell Howard and Andy Parsons	6	21 January 2010	25 February 2010	BBC Two
9	Hugh Dennis	Russell Howard and Andy Parsons	13	17 June 2010	21 December 2010	BBC Two
10	Hugh Dennis and Chris Addison	Andy Parsons	13	9 June 2011	20 December 2011	BBC Two
11	Hugh Dennis and Chris Addison	Andy Parsons	13	14 June 2012	27 December 2012	BBC Two
12	Hugh Dennis and Chris Addison	Andy Parsons	13	13 June 2013	31 December 2013	BBC Two
13	Hugh Dennis	Andy Parsons	14	12 June 2014	31 December 2014	BBC Two
14	Hugh Dennis	Andy Parsons	13	11 June 2015	21 December 2015	BBC Two
15	Hugh Dennis	None	13	9 June 2016	14 December 2016	BBC Two
16	Hugh Dennis	None	13	8 June 2017	20 December 2017	BBC Two
17	Hugh Dennis	None	13	7 June 2018	21 December 2018	BBC Two
18	Hugh Dennis	None	13	23 May 2019	20 December 2019	BBC Two
19	Hugh Dennis	None	13	22 October 2020	4 February 2021	BBC Two
20	Hugh Dennis	None	13	13 May 2021	28 December 2021	BBC Two
21	Hugh Dennis	None	7	23 September 2022	4 November 2022	BBC Two
22	None	Rhys James	9	1 February 2026	29 March 2026	TLC
Specials	None	Rhys James	5	7 June 2026	5 July 2026	TLC
23	None	Rhys James	11	13 September 2026	TBA	TLC

== Episode list ==
The coloured backgrounds denote the result of each of the shows:

– indicates Hugh's / the guest team won
– indicates Rory's / Andy's / the guest / Rhys' team won
– indicates the game ended in a draw or with neither team being declared the winner

Viewing figures are from BARB.

=== BBC (2005–22) ===
==== Series 1 (2005) ====
Episode	First broadcast	Frankie and Hugh's team	Rory's team	Viewers (millions)
01x01	5 June 2005	Linda Smith	Jeremy Hardy and John Oliver	2.00
01x02	12 June 2005	Jo Brand	Andy Parsons and Mark Steel	1.62
01x03	19 June 2005	Jo Brand	Al Murray and John Oliver	1.85
01x04	26 June 2005	David Mitchell	Andy Parsons and Linda Smith	1.33
01x05	3 July 2005	John Oliver	Jo Brand and David Mitchell	1.50
01x06	10 July 2005	Compilation episode – best of Series 1 and outtakes (Note: This episode was intended to be a normal episode (with guests Jo Brand, Andy Parsons and Greg Proops), however, several panel members were unable to attend filming due to the transport disruption caused by the July 2005 London bombings. As the format proved popular, clip shows were included in future series.)		—N/a

==== Series 2 (2006) ====
Episode	First broadcast	Frankie and Hugh's team	Rory's team	Viewers (millions)
02x01	20 January 2006	Jo Brand	John Oliver and Andy Parsons (Note: This is the only time that Andy was not sitting next to Dara on their team.)	2.06
02x02	27 January 2006	Gina Yashere	Al Murray and John Oliver	—N/a
02x03	3 February 2006	David Mitchell	Andy Parsons and Sue Perkins	—N/a
02x04	10 February 2006	Sandi Toksvig	Andy Parsons, David Mitchell and John Oliver (Note: Rory Bremner was unable to attend the recording of this episode)	—N/a
02x05	17 February 2006	Gina Yashere	Andy Parsons and Greg Proops	2.01
02x06	24 February 2006	Jo Brand	Jeremy Hardy and John Oliver	1.51
02x07	2 March 2006	Compilation episode – best of Series 2 and outtakes		—N/a

==== Series 3 (2006) ====
Episode	First broadcast	Frankie and Hugh's team	Andy's team	Viewers (millions)
03x01	14 September 2006	Gina Yashere	Clive Anderson and Russell Howard	1.69
03x02	21 September 2006	Ed Byrne	Jo Brand and Robin Ince	1.77
03x03	28 September 2006 (Note: Extended version of this episode titled 'The Anal Lube Show' available on the DVD release 'Mock The Week: Too Hot For TV 2')	Mark Watson	Jon Culshaw and Russell Howard	1.69
03x04	5 October 2006	Mark Watson	Jon Culshaw and Ian Stone	2.18
03x05	12 October 2006	Gina Yashere	Ed Byrne and Russell Howard	2.16
03x06	19 October 2006 (Note: Extended version of this episode titled 'The Leg Show' available on the DVD release 'Mock The Week: Too Hot For TV 2')	Adam Hills	Russell Howard and Mark Steel	2.48
03x07	26 October 2006	Compilation episode – best of Series 3 and outtakes		—N/a

==== Series 4 (2007) ====
Episode	First broadcast	Frankie and Hugh's team	Russell and Andy's team	Viewers (millions)
04x01	11 January 2007 (Note: Extended version of this episode titled 'The Elves and Testicles Show' available on the DVD release 'Mock The Week: Too Hot For TV 3')	Mark Watson	David Mitchell	2.41
04x02	18 January 2007	Ian Stone	Mark Watson	2.29
04x03	25 January 2007	Shappi Khorsandi	Fred MacAulay	1.92
04x04	1 February 2007 (Note: Extended version of this episode titled 'The Prison and Other Dodgy Stuff Show' available on the DVD release 'Mock The Week: Too Hot For TV 3')	Gina Yashere	Ed Byrne	1.92
04x05	8 February 2007 (Note: Extended version of this episode titled 'The Johnny Blowjob and Bird Flu Show' available on the DVD release 'Mock The Week: Too Hot For TV 3')	Rhod Gilbert	Jo Caulfield	2.14
04x06	15 February 2007	Compilation episode – best of Series 4 and outtakes		—N/a

==== Series 5 (2007) ====
Episode	First broadcast	Frankie and Hugh's team	Russell and Andy's team	Viewers (millions)
05x01	12 July 2007	Michael McIntyre	Jan Ravens	2.05
05x02	19 July 2007	Mark Watson	Jo Caulfield	2.00
05x03	26 July 2007	Rhod Gilbert	Lauren Laverne	1.98
05x04	2 August 2007	Adam Hills	Jo Caulfield	1.89
05x05	9 August 2007	Jimmy Tingle	David Mitchell	2.25
05x06	16 August 2007	Ben Norris	Ed Byrne	2.24
05x07	23 August 2007 (Note: Extended version of this episode titled 'Putin, Henman & Konnie Huq' available on the DVD release 'Mock The Week: Too Hot For TV')	Fiona Allen	David Mitchell	2.26
05x08	30 August 2007 (Note: Extended version of this episode titled 'The Hedgehog Show' available on the DVD release 'Mock The Week: Too Hot For TV 2')	Alun Cochrane	Ed Byrne	2.49
05x09	6 September 2007	Mark Watson	Jo Caulfield	2.10
05x10	13 September 2007 (Note: Extended version of this episode titled 'Nuts, Pies and Nim Nim Nim' available on the DVD release 'Mock The Week: Too Hot For TV')	Ed Byrne	Gina Yashere	2.12
05x11	20 September 2007 (Note: Extended version of this episode titled 'Money, Sex and The Lib Dems' available on the DVD release 'Mock The Week: Too Hot For TV')	Michael McIntyre	Ben Norris	1.92
05x12	27 September 2007	Compilation episode – best of Series 5 and outtakes		2.22

==== Series 6 (2008) ====
Episode	First broadcast	Frankie and Hugh's team	Russell and Andy's team	Viewers (millions)
06x01	10 July 2008	Michael McIntyre	Lucy Porter	2.84
06x02	17 July 2008	Stephen K. Amos	Ed Byrne	2.71
06x03	24 July 2008	Greg Davies	Danielle Ward	2.83
06x04	31 July 2008	Michael McIntyre	Mark Watson	2.97
06x05	7 August 2008	Ed Byrne	Zoe Lyons	2.81
06x06	14 August 2008	Adam Hills	David Mitchell	2.78
06x07	21 August 2008	Lucy Porter	David Mitchell	3.27
06x08	28 August 2008	Greg Proops	Fred MacAulay	3.48
06x09	4 September 2008	Michael McIntyre	Lauren Laverne	3.10
06x10	11 September 2008	Stewart Francis	Ed Byrne	3.80
06x11	18 September 2008	Adam Bloom	Gina Yashere	3.29
06x12	25 September 2008	Compilation episode – best of Series 6 and outtakes		2.81
06x13	23 December 2008	Christmas Special – Christmas-related clips and series highlights		2.91

==== Series 7 (2009) ====
Episode	First broadcast	Frankie and Hugh's team	Russell and Andy's team	Viewers (millions)
07x01	9 July 2009	Gina Yashere	Frank Skinner	2.99
07x02	16 July 2009	Tom Stade	Rhod Gilbert	2.89
07x03	23 July 2009	Greg Davies	Lucy Porter	2.82
07x04	30 July 2009	Adam Hills	Alun Cochrane	2.62
07x05	6 August 2009	Stewart Francis	Zoe Lyons	2.61
07x06	13 August 2009	Stewart Francis	Ed Byrne	2.74
07x07	20 August 2009	Compilation episode – best of Series 7 so far and outtakes		2.24
07x08	27 August 2009	Seann Walsh	Fred MacAulay	2.60
07x09	3 September 2009	Stewart Francis	Holly Walsh	3.03
07x10	10 September 2009	Jack Whitehall	Ed Byrne	2.92
07x11	17 September 2009	Sarah Millican	David Mitchell	2.81
07x12	24 September 2009	Milton Jones and David Mitchell (Note: Frankie Boyle was unable to attend the recording of this episode)	Ben Norris	3.19
07x13	22 December 2009	Christmas Special – Christmas-related clips and series highlights		3.64

==== Series 8 (2010) ====
Episode	First broadcast	Hugh's team	Russell and Andy's team	Viewers (millions)
08x01	21 January 2010	Milton Jones and Patrick Kielty	Mark Watson	2.93
08x02	28 January 2010	Chris Addison and Sarah Millican	John Bishop	2.81
08x03	4 February 2010	Stewart Francis and Andrew Maxwell	Andi Osho	2.90
08x04	11 February 2010	Milton Jones and Jack Whitehall	Holly Walsh	3.06
08x05	18 February 2010	Chris Addison and Kevin Bridges	Ed Byrne	2.82
08x06	25 February 2010	Compilation episode – best of Series 8 and outtakes		3.33

==== Series 9 (2010) ====
Episode	First broadcast	Hugh's team	Russell and Andy's team	Viewers (millions)
09x01	17 June 2010	Chris Addison and Milton Jones	Diane Morgan	2.42
09x02	24 June 2010	Nik Rabinowitz and Jack Whitehall	Jarred Christmas	2.14
09x03	1 July 2010	Chris Addison and Micky Flanagan	Ed Byrne	2.37
09x04	15 July 2010	Milton Jones and Seann Walsh	Zoe Lyons	2.77
09x05	22 July 2010	Chris Addison and Stewart Francis	Ed Byrne	2.43
09x06	29 July 2010	Compilation episode – best of Series 9 so far and outtakes		2.49
09x07	9 September 2010 (Note: This series included a Summer break to accommodate the Edinburgh Festival)	Chris Addison and Milton Jones	Andi Osho	2.67
Episode	First broadcast	Hugh's team	Andy's team	Viewers (millions)
09x08	16 September 2010	Stewart Francis and Miles Jupp	Ed Byrne and Micky Flanagan	2.48
09x09	23 September 2010	Milton Jones and Russell Kane	Kevin Bridges and Patrick Kielty	2.36
09x10	30 September 2010	Chris Addison and Carl Donnelly	Andi Osho and Jack Whitehall	2.96
09x11	7 October 2010	Chris Addison and Jack Whitehall	Ed Byrne and Miles Jupp	2.54
09x12	14 October 2010	Compilation episode – best of Series 9 and outtakes		2.20
09x13	21 December 2010	Christmas Special – Christmas-related clips and series highlights		2.10

==== Comic Relief special (2011) ====
Episode	First broadcast	Team on the Left	Team on the Right
Sp.	5 March 2011 (Note: Special episode webcast live as part of 24 Hour Panel People, Hugh Dennis was not present)	Andrew Maxwell, Daniel Sloss and David Walliams	Doc Brown, Andy Parsons and Seann Walsh

==== Series 10 (2011) ====
Episode	First broadcast	Hugh's team	Andy's team	Viewers (millions)
10x01	9 June 2011	Chris Addison and Milton Jones	Greg Davies and Seann Walsh	2.49
10x02	16 June 2011	Chris Addison and Diane Morgan	Ed Byrne and Micky Flanagan	2.27
10x03	23 June 2011	Chris Addison and Stewart Francis	Ava Vidal and Seann Walsh	3.20
10x04	30 June 2011	Alun Cochrane and Milton Jones	Micky Flanagan and Zoe Lyons	2.54
10x05	7 July 2011	Milton Jones and Jack Whitehall	Ed Byrne and Micky Flanagan	2.62
10x06	14 July 2011	Compilation episode – best of Series 10 so far and outtakes		2.59
Episode	First broadcast	Chris and Hugh's team	Andy's team	Viewers (millions)
10x07	8 September 2011	Stewart Francis	Nathan Caton and Micky Flanagan	2.25
10x08	15 September 2011	Carl Donnelly	Miles Jupp and Ava Vidal	2.08
10x09	22 September 2011	Greg Davies	Simon Evans and Micky Flanagan	2.28
10x10	29 September 2011	Milton Jones	Ed Byrne and Holly Walsh	2.32
10x11	6 October 2011	Stewart Francis	Ed Byrne and Adam Hills	2.29
10x12	13 October 2011	Milton Jones	Miles Jupp and Andi Osho	2.25
10x13	20 December 2011	Christmas Special – Christmas-related clips and series highlights		2.41

==== Series 11 (2012) ====
Episode	First broadcast	Chris and Hugh's team	Andy's team	Viewers (millions)
11x01	14 June 2012	Greg Davies	Nathan Caton and Micky Flanagan	2.50
11x02	21 June 2012	Milton Jones	Jo Caulfield and Carl Donnelly	2.32
11x03	1 July 2012 (Note: Delayed to the Sunday on account of Wimbledon coverage overrunning)	Gary Delaney	Marcus Brigstocke and Zoe Lyons	1.90
11x04	5 July 2012 (Note: The 100th broadcast episode of the show; to mark this, the episode ended with a five-minute compilation of the producers' favourite moments from the previous 99 episodes)	Milton Jones	Ava Vidal and Mark Watson	2.90
11x05	12 July 2012 (Note: In reference to his appearance in the Wimbledon final (which he lost in 2012 and won in 2016), audience member Andy Murray was declared the winner of the episode)	Milton Jones	Miles Jupp and Josh Widdicombe	2.67
11x06	19 July 2012	Compilation episode – best of Series 11 so far and outtakes		2.11
11x07	6 September 2012	Stewart Francis	Alun Cochrane and Andi Osho	1.47
11x08	13 September 2012	Milton Jones	Ed Byrne, Chris Ramsey and Josh Widdicombe (Note: Andy Parsons was unable to attend the recording of this episode)	1.93
11x09	20 September 2012	Gary Delaney	Jo Caulfield and Greg Davies	1.95
11x10	27 September 2012	Milton Jones	Josh Widdicombe and Joe Wilkinson	1.90
11x11	4 October 2012	Gary Delaney	Ed Byrne and Alun Cochrane	2.14
11x12	11 October 2012	Milton Jones	Katherine Ryan and Josh Widdicombe	1.99
11x13	27 December 2012	Christmas Special – Christmas-related clips and series highlights		1.77

==== Mock the Week Looks Back At... (2013) ====
Episode	First broadcast	Subject	Viewers (millions)
LBAx01	3 March 2013	Health	1.50
LBAx02	10 March 2013	Animals	—N/a
LBAx03	17 March 2013	Education	—N/a
LBAx04	24 March 2013	Entertainment	—N/a
LBAx05	31 March 2013	Law & Order	1.10
LBAx06	7 April 2013	Science & Technology	1.02
LBAx07	21 April 2013	Travel	1.34
LBAx08	28 April 2013	Britain	1.05
LBAx09	12 May 2013	Royals	—N/a
LBAx10	19 May 2013	Food & Drink	1.22

==== Series 12 (2013) ====
Episode	First broadcast	Chris and Hugh's team	Andy's team	Viewers (millions)
12x01	13 June 2013	Milton Jones	Katherine Ryan and Josh Widdicombe	2.71
12x02	20 June 2013	Gary Delaney	Nathan Caton and Miles Jupp	1.71
12x03	27 June 2013	Gary Delaney	Holly Walsh and Josh Widdicombe	1.86
12x04	4 July 2013	Milton Jones	Ed Byrne and Ava Vidal	1.73
12x05	11 July 2013	Hal Cruttenden	Ed Byrne and Josh Widdicombe	1.72
12x06	18 July 2013	Rob Beckett	Ed Byrne and Chris Ramsey	1.94
Episode	First broadcast	Hugh's team	Andy's team	Viewers (millions)
12x07	5 September 2013	Rob Beckett and Stewart Francis	Ed Byrne and Katherine Ryan	1.66
12x08	12 September 2013	Gary Delaney and Alistair McGowan	Hal Cruttenden and Miles Jupp	1.47
12x09	19 September 2013	Ed Byrne and Milton Jones	Hal Cruttenden and Holly Walsh	1.79
12x10	26 September 2013	Gary Delaney and Josh Widdicombe	Rob Beckett and Romesh Ranganathan	1.66
12x11	3 October 2013	Milton Jones and Seann Walsh	Miles Jupp and Josh Widdicombe	1.69
12x12	10 October 2013	Compilation episode – best of Series 12 and outtakes		1.64
12x13	31 December 2013	Christmas Special – Christmas-related clips and series highlights		—N/a

==== Series 13 (2014) ====
Episode	First broadcast	Hugh's team	Andy's team	Viewers (millions)
13x01	12 June 2014	Ed Byrne and Milton Jones	Romesh Ranganathan and Katherine Ryan	1.21
13x02	19 June 2014	Rob Beckett and Gary Delaney	Sara Pascoe and Josh Widdicombe	1.59
13x03	26 June 2014	Miles Jupp and Romesh Ranganathan	Angela Barnes and Josh Widdicombe	1.57
13x04	3 July 2014	Hal Cruttenden and Romesh Ranganathan	Rob Beckett and Susan Calman	2.06
13x05	10 July 2014	Gary Delaney and Romesh Ranganathan	Tiff Stevenson and Josh Widdicombe	1.90
13x06	17 July 2014	Ed Byrne and Milton Jones	Russell Kane and Zoe Lyons	1.74
13x07	11 September 2014	Ed Byrne and Gary Delaney	Katherine Ryan and Josh Widdicombe	1.37
13x08	18 September 2014	Gary Delaney and Romesh Ranganathan	Rob Beckett and Sara Pascoe	1.64
13x09	26 September 2014 (Note: Moved back a day due to the broadcast of Marvellous)	Rob Beckett and Milton Jones	Romesh Ranganathan and Holly Walsh	1.66
13x10	2 October 2014	James Acaster and Ed Byrne	Sara Pascoe and Josh Widdicombe	1.58
13x11	9 October 2014	Ed Byrne and Milton Jones	Rob Beckett and Zoe Lyons	1.67
13x12	21 November 2014	Compilation episode – best of Series 13 and outtakes		—N/a
13x13	23 December 2014	Christmas Special – Christmas-related clips and series highlights		2.11
13x14	31 December 2014	New Year's Eve Special – New Year-related clips and series highlights		—N/a

==== Series 14 (2015) ====
Episode	First broadcast	Hugh's team	Andy's team	Viewers (millions)
14x01	11 June 2015	James Acaster and Josh Widdicombe	Matt Forde and Katherine Ryan	1.58
14x02	18 June 2015	Milton Jones and Josh Widdicombe	Rob Beckett and Ellie Taylor	1.50
14x03	25 June 2015	Ed Byrne and Gary Delaney	James Acaster and Sara Pascoe	1.52
14x04	2 July 2015	Miles Jupp and Romesh Ranganathan	Rob Beckett and Tiff Stevenson	1.64
14x05	9 July 2015	Ed Byrne and Milton Jones	Matt Forde, Zoe Lyons and Josh Widdicombe	—N/a
14x06	16 July 2015	Ed Byrne and Ed Gamble	Rob Beckett, Sara Pascoe and Romesh Ranganathan	—N/a
14x07	10 September 2015	Milton Jones and Josh Widdicombe	Ed Gamble and Katherine Ryan	1.57
14x08	17 September 2015	Ed Byrne and Nathan Caton	Ed Gamble and Sara Pascoe	1.43
14x09	24 September 2015	Gary Delaney and Josh Widdicombe	James Acaster and Zoe Lyons	1.52
14x10	1 October 2015	James Acaster and Rob Beckett	Ellie Taylor and Josh Widdicombe	1.65
14x11	8 October 2015	Ed Byrne and Milton Jones	Rob Beckett, Ed Gamble and Holly Walsh	1.70
14x12	19 October 2015	Compilation episode – best of Series 14 and outtakes		1.43
14x13	21 December 2015	Christmas Special – Christmas-related clips and series highlights		2.01

==== Series 15 (2016) ====
Episode	First broadcast	Hugh's team	Guest team	Viewers (millions)
15x01	9 June 2016	Gary Delaney and Josh Widdicombe	Ed Gamble, Nish Kumar and Tiff Stevenson	1.77
15x02	21 July 2016 (Note: Pulled from its originally planned 16 June broadcast due to the murder of Jo Cox)	James Acaster and Ed Byrne	Dane Baptiste, Rob Beckett and Holly Walsh	1.45
15x03	23 June 2016	Angela Barnes and Milton Jones	Rob Beckett, Ed Byrne and Miles Jupp	1.62
15x04	1 July 2016 (Note: Moved back a day due to Wimbledon coverage)	Gary Delaney and Ed Gamble	Rob Beckett, Rhys James and Zoe Lyons	1.66
15x05	7 July 2016	James Acaster and Ed Byrne	Rob Beckett, John Robins and Holly Walsh	1.80
15x06	14 July 2016	Milton Jones and Josh Widdicombe	Loyiso Gola, Miles Jupp and Ellie Taylor	1.84
15x07	9 September 2016	Milton Jones and Romesh Ranganathan	Rob Beckett, Ed Gamble and Tiff Stevenson	1.87
15x08	16 September 2016	Angela Barnes and Ed Gamble	Ed Byrne, Ivo Graham and Romesh Ranganathan	1.82
15x09	23 September 2016	James Acaster and Gary Delaney	Rob Beckett, Elis James and Sara Pascoe	1.72
15x10	30 September 2016	Ed Byrne and Milton Jones	Nish Kumar, Zoe Lyons and Josh Widdicombe	1.96
15x11	7 October 2016	James Acaster and Ed Gamble	Rob Beckett, Sara Pascoe and John Robins	1.77
15x12	14 October 2016	Compilation episode – best of Series 15 and outtakes		1.65
15x13	14 December 2016	Christmas Special – Christmas-related clips and series highlights		1.78

==== Series 16 (2017) ====
Episode	First broadcast	Hugh's team	Guest team	Viewers (millions)
16x01	8 June 2017 (Note: Election special)	Angela Barnes and Milton Jones	James Acaster, Ed Gamble and Tez Ilyas	1.55
16x02	15 June 2017	James Acaster and Rhys James	Ed Gamble, Nish Kumar and Zoe Lyons	1.36
16x03	22 June 2017	Angela Barnes and Gary Delaney	Ed Gamble, Kerry Godliman and Nish Kumar	1.77
16x04	29 June 2017	Angela Barnes and Nish Kumar	Ed Byrne, Milton Jones and Romesh Ranganathan	1.58
16x05	6 July 2017	Angela Barnes and Ed Gamble	Ed Byrne, Hal Cruttenden and Zoe Lyons	1.56
16x06	13 July 2017	Tom Allen and Rhys James	Ed Byrne, Nish Kumar and Tiff Stevenson	1.67
16x07	8 September 2017	Angela Barnes and Milton Jones	Ed Byrne, Ed Gamble and Nish Kumar	1.85
16x08	15 September 2017	James Acaster and Tom Allen	Ed Byrne, Rhys James and Ellie Taylor	1.49
16x09	22 September 2017	James Acaster and Gary Delaney	Ed Byrne, Ivo Graham and Zoe Lyons	1.62
16x10	29 September 2017	James Acaster and Angela Barnes	Kerry Godliman, Nish Kumar and Glenn Moore	1.78
16x11	6 October 2017	Milton Jones and Miles Jupp	Ed Gamble, Nish Kumar and Felicity Ward	1.69
16x12	13 October 2017	Compilation episode – best of Series 16 and outtakes		1.52
16x13	20 December 2017	Christmas Special – Christmas-related clips and series highlights		1.29

==== Series 17 (2018) ====
From episode 7 onwards, viewing figures include four-screen data.

Episode	First broadcast	Hugh's team	Guest team	Viewers (millions)
17x01	7 June 2018	James Acaster and Angela Barnes	Ed Gamble, Darren Harriott and Zoe Lyons	1.24
17x02	14 June 2018	Angela Barnes and Milton Jones	Ed Gamble, London Hughes and Rhys James	1.41
17x03	21 June 2018	James Acaster and Tom Allen	Ari Eldjárn, Ed Gamble and Ellie Taylor	1.34
17x04	28 June 2018	Angela Barnes and Milton Jones	Desiree Burch, Ed Byrne and Glenn Moore	1.41
17x05	5 July 2018	James Acaster and Tom Allen	Ed Byrne, Kerry Godliman and Tez Ilyas	1.52
17x06	12 July 2018	Angela Barnes and Rhys James	Ed Byrne, Nish Kumar and Suzi Ruffell	1.65
17x07	7 September 2018	Angela Barnes and Nish Kumar	Rhys James, Tiff Stevenson and Ed Gamble	1.66
17x08	14 September 2018	Ed Byrne and Milton Jones	Tom Allen, Deborah Frances-White and Rhys James	—N/a
17x09	21 September 2018	Ed Byrne and Rachel Parris	Ed Gamble, Kerry Godliman and Nish Kumar	1.89
17x10	28 September 2018	Angela Barnes and Larry Dean	Ed Byrne, Ed Gamble and Kerry Godliman	1.70
17x11	5 October 2018	Milton Jones and Geoff Norcott	Tom Allen, Ed Gamble and Zoe Lyons	1.86
17x12	12 October 2018	Compilation episode – best of Series 17 and outtakes		1.52
17x13	21 December 2018	Christmas Special – Christmas-related clips and series highlights		2.11

==== Series 18 (2019) ====
Episode	First broadcast	Hugh's team	Guest team	Viewers (millions)
18x01	23 May 2019	Tom Allen and Sindhu Vee	Ed Gamble, Kerry Godliman and Rhys James	1.54
18x02	30 May 2019	Angela Barnes and Glenn Moore	Tom Allen, Ed Gamble and Olga Koch	1.38
18x03	6 June 2019	Angela Barnes and Nish Kumar	Ed Byrne, Rhys James and Ellie Taylor	1.45
18x04	13 June 2019	Milton Jones and Rachel Parris	Ed Gamble, Kerry Godliman and Glenn Moore	1.35
18x05	21 June 2019 (Note: Moved back a day due to Queen's Club Championships coverage overrunning)	Larry Dean and Tiff Stevenson	Maisie Adam, Ed Byrne and Ed Gamble	1.16
18x06	27 June 2019	Angela Barnes and Milton Jones	Tom Allen, Ed Byrne and Sophie Duker	1.45
18x07	1 November 2019	Angela Barnes and Rhys James	Eshaan Akbar, Ed Gamble and Sindhu Vee	1.64
18x08	8 November 2019	Rhys James and Olga Koch	Ed Byrne, Nigel Ng and Suzi Ruffell	1.63
18x09	22 November 2019 (Note: This series took a break to accommodate Children in Need.)	Ed Byrne and Mark Simmons	Maisie Adam, Sophie Duker and Ed Gamble	—N/a
18x10	29 November 2019	Angela Barnes and Milton Jones	Ed Byrne, Kerry Godliman and Chris Washington	—N/a
18x11	6 December 2019	Tom Allen and Rosie Jones	Ed Gamble, Kerry Godliman and Rhys James	—N/a
18x12	13 December 2019	Compilation episode – best of Series 18 and outtakes		—N/a
18x13	20 December 2019	Christmas Special – Christmas-related clips and series highlights		1.65

==== Series 19 (2020–21) ====
Episode	First broadcast	Hugh's team	Guest team	Viewers (millions)
19x01	22 October 2020	Angela Barnes and Nigel Ng	Tom Allen, Rhys James and Athena Kugblenu	1.61
19x02	29 October 2020	Ed Byrne and Sophie Duker	Maisie Adam, Eshaan Akbar and Ed Gamble	1.86
19x03	5 November 2020	Ed Byrne and Mark Simmons	Maisie Adam, Ed Gamble and Sukh Ojla	N/A (<1.72) (Note: Not reported in the weekly top 15 programmes for four-screen viewer ratings.)
19x04	19 November 2020	Angela Barnes and Milton Jones	Tom Allen, Ed Byrne and Thanyia Moore	N/A (<1.81)
19x05	26 November 2020	Angela Barnes and Rhys James	Maisie Adam, Ed Gamble and Michael Odewale	1.87
19x06	3 December 2020 (Note: Maff Brown, who was the warm-up act, appeared on the show as a last-minute replacement for Angela Barnes, who was ill. They couldn't get a usual replacement due to COVID restrictions.)	Maff Brown and Rhys James	Tom Allen, Ed Byrne and Ria Lina	1.88
19x07	10 December 2020	Rhys James and Laura Lexx	Ed Byrne, Glenn Moore and Sukh Ojla	1.85
19x08	21 December 2020	Christmas Special – Christmas-related clips and series highlights		1.87
19x09	31 December 2020	Compilation episode – best of Series 19 and outtakes		N/A (<1.72)
19x10	14 January 2021	Maisie Adam and Ed Byrne	Ed Gamble, Rhys James and Ria Lina	N/A (<1.77)
19x11	21 January 2021	Angela Barnes and Catherine Bohart	Ed Gamble, Rhys James and Michael Odewale	N/A (<2.06)
19x12	28 January 2021	Angela Barnes and Rhys James	Maisie Adam, Ed Gamble and Milton Jones	N/A (<1.88)
19x13	4 February 2021	Angela Barnes and Glenn Moore	Maisie Adam, Ed Gamble and Ahir Shah	1.81

==== Series 20 (2021) ====
Episode	First broadcast	Hugh's team	Guest team	Viewers (millions)
20x01	13 May 2021	Angela Barnes and Alasdair Beckett-King	Maisie Adam, Eshaan Akbar and Rhys James	N/A (<1.52)
20x02	20 May 2021	Rhys James and Felicity Ward	Catherine Bohart, Ed Byrne and Darren Harriott	1.57
20x03	27 May 2021	Angela Barnes and Ahir Shah	Maisie Adam, Rhys James and Robin Morgan	1.61
20x04	3 June 2021	Angela Barnes and Milton Jones	Maisie Adam, Ed Byrne and Kae Kurd	1.58
20x05	10 June 2021	Rhys James and Laura Lexx	Alasdair Beckett-King, Ed Byrne and Athena Kugblenu	1.48
20x06	17 June 2021 (Note: This episode was broadcast in a later timeslot of 11:30pm to accommodate the broadcast of feature-length drama Together. To compensate, this episode was repeated at the usual time of 10pm two days later.)	Angela Barnes and Glenn Moore	Maisie Adam, Ed Byrne and Evelyn Mok	N/A (<0.98)
20x07	4 November 2021 (Note: With this episode, the show returned to a full studio audience.)	Maisie Adam and Alasdair Beckett-King	Ivo Graham, Rhys James and Ria Lina	N/A (<1.51)
20x08	11 November 2021	Angela Barnes and Glenn Moore	Ed Byrne, Sarah Keyworth and Ahir Shah	N/A (<1.65)
20x09	25 November 2021	Angela Barnes and Ahir Shah	Maisie Adam, Rhys James and Jen Brister	N/A (<1.74)
20x10	2 December 2021	Angela Barnes and Jonny Pelham	Rhys James, Laura Lexx and Ahir Shah	N/A (<1.53)
20x11	9 December 2021	Maisie Adam and Milton Jones	Rhys James, Emily Lloyd-Saini and Glenn Moore	N/A (<1.86)
20x12	16 December 2021	Compilation episode – best of Series 20 and outtakes		N/A (<1.69)
20x13	28 December 2021	End of Year highlights – A look back at the year gone by, with outtakes		1.63

==== Series 21 (2022) ====
Episode	First broadcast	Hugh's team	Guest team	Viewers (millions) (Note: Viewership within 28 days of broadcast)
21x01	23 September 2022 (Note: The episode scheduled for 16 September 2022, which would have featured guests Maisie Adam, Ed Byrne, Rhys James, Milton Jones and Evelyn Mok, was cancelled following the death of Queen Elizabeth II.)	Angela Barnes and Alasdair Beckett-King	Rhys James, Ria Lina and Josh Pugh	N/A
21x02	30 September 2022	Angela Barnes and Milton Jones	James Acaster, Ed Byrne and Nish Kumar	1.32
21x03	7 October 2022	Angela Barnes and Ahir Shah	Rhys James, Laura Lexx and Glenn Moore	N/A
21x04	14 October 2022	Angela Barnes and Glenn Moore	Jen Brister, Ed Byrne and Sean McLoughlin	N/A
21x05	21 October 2022	Angela Barnes and Alasdair Beckett-King	Rhys James, Zoe Lyons and Ahir Shah	N/A
21x06	28 October 2022	The History of Mock the Week (Part 1) – compilation episode of early series		1.60
21x07	4 November 2022	The History of Mock the Week (Part 2) – compilation episode of later series		1.47

=== TLC (2026 onward) ===
==== Series 22 (2026) ====
A nine-episode series – including a compilation of best bits and outtakes – began 1 February 2026, with eight episodes recorded weekly between 27 January and 17 March 2026. Rhys James is now a regular panellist, with Hugh Dennis only present for three episodes, due to other work commitments. Former regular panellist Russell Howard returned to make his first appearance on the show since Series 9 in 2010, with Katherine Ryan and Sara Pascoe returning for the first time since, respectively, Series 14 in 2015 and Series 15 in 2016.

Episode	First broadcast	Guest team	Rhys's team	Viewers (millions) (Note: Viewership within 28 days of broadcast, excluding repeats.)
22x01	1 February 2026	Angela Barnes, Ed Byrne and Sara Pascoe	Ahir Shah and Russell Howard	0.74
22x02	8 February 2026	Angela Barnes, Ed Byrne and Ahir Shah	Milton Jones and Lou Sanders	0.72
22x03	15 February 2026	Glenn Moore, Hugh Dennis and Sara Pascoe	Katherine Ryan and Sarah Keyworth	N/A
22x04	22 February 2026	Angela Barnes, Sean McLoughlin and Alasdair Beckett-King	Ria Lina and Mark Simmons	0.75
22x05	1 March 2026	Glenn Moore, Ed Byrne and Zoe Lyons	Sara Pascoe and Emmanuel Sonubi	N/A
22x06	8 March 2026	Angela Barnes, Ahir Shah and Glenn Moore	Milton Jones and Sarah Keyworth	N/A
22x07	15 March 2026	Ellie Taylor, Hugh Dennis and Alasdair Beckett-King	Janine Harouni and Ed Byrne	N/A
22x08	22 March 2026	Ed Byrne, Hugh Dennis and Sara Pascoe	Katherine Ryan and Scott Bennett	N/A
22x09	29 March 2026	Compilation episode – best of Series 22 and outtakes		N/A

==== Summer Specials (2026) ====
A five-episode run, of 'summer specials', commissioned in April 2026, were broadcast from 7 June 2026; with four episodes recorded between 2 and 24 June 2026. Russell Howard was confirmed as a panellist prior to the run, but ultimately did not appear in an episode.

Episode	First broadcast	Guest team	Rhys's team	Viewers (millions)
Sx01	7 June 2026	Sara Pascoe, Ed Gamble and Josh Pugh	Ahir Shah and Laura Lexx	N/A
Sx02	14 June 2026	Glenn Moore, Hugh Dennis and Michelle Wolf	Sara Pascoe and Scott Bennett	N/A
Sx03	21 June 2026	Glenn Moore, Maisie Adam and Chris Ramsey	Sarah Keyworth and Ed Byrne	0.39
Sx04	28 June 2026	Angela Barnes, Hugh Dennis and Milton Jones	Janine Harouni and Ed Byrne	N/A
Sx05	5 July 2026	Compilation episode – best of Summer Specials and outtakes		0.36

==== Series 23 (2026) ====
A twenty-third series, including Christmas and end-of-year specials, began on 13 September 2026.

Seven recordings took place between 8 September and 20 October 2026; five of which at Television Centre, London and two at Versa Studios London. The Christmas special is due to be recorded on 1 December 2026. An eleventh episode confirmed as part of the March 2026 commission did not materialise.

Returning guests London Hughes, Maisie Adam, and Russell Howard were announced as being due to appear, but ultimately did not.

Episode	First broadcast	Guest team	Rhys's team	Viewers (millions)
23x01	13 September 2026	Laura Lexx, Hugh Dennis and Ahir Shah	Sara Pascoe and Scott Bennett	0.52
23x02	20 September 2026	Angela Barnes, Ed Byrne and Finlay Christie	Neil Delamere (Note: Replacing Scott Bennett, who was originally slated to appear.) and Zoe Lyons	N/A
23x03	27 September 2026	Angela Barnes, Hugh Dennis and Ivo Graham	Sarah Keyworth and Scott Bennett	N/A
23x04	4 October 2026	Janine Harouni, Ed Byrne and Glenn Moore	Harriet Kemsley and Ahir Shah	TBA
23x05	11 October 2026	Glenn Moore, Hugh Dennis and Sara Pascoe	Sarah Keyworth and Emmanuel Sonubi	TBA
23x06	18 October 2026	Angela Barnes, Ed Byrne and Alasdair Beckett-King	Janine Harouni and Glenn Moore (Note: Replacing Ed Gamble, who was originally slated to appear.)	TBA
23x07	25 October 2026	Ahir Shah, Sara Pascoe and Milton Jones	Neil Delamere and Zoe Lyons	TBA
23x08	1 November 2026	Compilation episode – best of Series 23 and outtakes		TBA
23x09	December 2026	Christmas Special – Christmas-related clips and series highlights		TBC
23x10	December 2026	End of Year highlights – A look back at the year gone by, with outtakes		TBC

==== Further series ====
Three series for a 2027 broadcast, totalling 22 episodes, were announced in July 2026. The first of these will run for seven episodes from February 2027.

== Scores ==
Despite not being a serious competition, points are awarded at the end of each round and a winner is announced at the conclusion of each episode. Below is the number of series and episode wins by each of the regular panellists.

=== BBC Series (2005–2022) ===
Hugh	Frankie	Chris	Rory	Andy	Russell	Guests
Series wins (1 drawn)
6			14			
6	4	2	0	7	4	7
Episode wins (3 drawn)
88			107			
88	33	9	3	58	24	46

=== TLC Series (2026–present) ===
Guests	Rhys
Series wins (0 drawn)
2 (including the Summer Specials)	1
Episode wins (0 drawn)
10	9
