= Matthew Rees (disambiguation) =

Matthew Rees (born 1980) is a Welsh former professional rugby union player.

Matthew Rees may also refer to:

- Matthew Rees (racing driver) (born 2005), Welsh racing driver
- Matthew Rees (footballer) (born 1982), Welsh footballer
- Matt Rees, Welsh novelist and journalist
- Matt Rees (comedian), Welsh comedian
- Matthew Rhys (born 1974), Welsh actor
