= Benjamin Norris =

Benjamin Norris is the name of:

- Frank Norris (Benjamin Franklin Norris, 1870–1902), American novelist writing predominantly in the naturalist genre
- Benjamin White Norris (1819–1873), U.S. Representative from Alabama
- Ben Norris (artist) (1910–2006), painter
- Ben Norris (comedian), British stand-up comedian
- Ben Norris (soccer), soccer player for U.S. team Orange County SC
