= BBC New Comedy Award =

Competition for new comedians

- Awarded for: Best in new stand-up comedy talent
- Country: United Kingdom
- First award: 1995; 2011 (revival)
- Currently held by: Eli Hart (2025)
- Website: BBC New Comedy Award at BBC Online

Television/radio coverage
- Network: BBC1 (1995–1999, 2021–present); BBC Choice (2000–2002); BBC Three (2003, 2021–present); BBC Radio 7 (2004–2006); BBC Radio 4 Extra (2011–2019); BBC Radio 2 (2011–2015); BBC Radio 4 (2016–2019)

The BBC New Comedy Award first took place in 1995, and it is considered to be one of the top UK comedy newcomer awards.

It was axed in 2006, being replaced by a nationwide talent hunt that places its emphasis on sketch writing and filmed performance. However, in March 2011 the BBC Radio New Comedy Award was relaunched in conjunction with BBC Radio 2, and ran as a joint project between Radio 2 and BBC Radio 4 Extra. The arrangement was for Radio 4 Extra to broadcast the heats and semi-finals of the contest, whilst Radio 2 (later Radio 4) broadcasts the live final. The 2021 series moved online to BBC Three, with a repeat broadcast on BBC One. By the 2022 contest, BBC Three had returned to terrestrial TV, so the heats were aired on that channel and the final aired on BBC One.

== Winners & finalists ==
The finals of this event have boasted many well known names that have continued to work in comedy to great acclaim - amongst the winners of the award are: Julian Barratt (1995), Marcus Brigstocke (1996), Paul Foot (1997), Josie Long (1999), Alan Carr (2001), Nina Conti (2002), Rhod Gilbert (2003), Angela Barnes (2011) and Lost Voice Guy (2014). Other notable finalists include Peter Kay, Bennett Arron, Lee Mack, Russell Howard, Daniel Kitson, Justin Lee Collins, David O'Doherty, Shappi Khorsandi, Joe Lycett and Sarah Millican.

Year	Winner	Finalists
1995	Julian Barratt	Daniel Kitson; Silky; Lee Mack; Ambrose Martose; Viv Gee; Jeff Mirza
1996	Marcus Brigstocke; Jenny Ross	Chris Addison; Alan Doyle; Addy Van Der Borgh; Neil Bromley; Marian Kilpatrick; Bob May
1997	Paul Foot	Bennett Arron; Justin Lee Collins; Craig Crookston; Neil Anthony; Gareth Hughes; Peter Kay; Deirdre O'Kane
1998	Dan Antopolski	Mary Bourke; Tony Coffey; Rhodri Crooks; Danny Oakes; Dan Tetsell; Helen Pilcher; Caroline Quinlan
1999	Josie Long	David O'Doherty; Marc Small; Matthew Walters; Scott Pragnell; Colin Ward; Steve Harris
2000	Jason John Whitehead	Anthony J Brown; Angie McEvoy; Shappi Khorsandi; Paddy Bramwells; Billy Dufus; Alan Hulcoop; Des McLean
2001	Alan Carr	Marcus Birdman; Keith Carter (as "Nige"); Jarred Christmas; Michael Downey; Des Clarke; Rob Deering; Russell Howard; Justin Moorhouse
2002	Nina Conti	Dylan; Bob Kobe; Paul Kerensa; Gary Delaney; Stefano Paolini; Ninia Benjamin; Karl Spain
2003	Rhod Gilbert	Michael Anderson; Greg Cook (runner-up); Steve Hall (runner-up); Ava Vidal "Lloydy the illegal street trader"
2004	Andrew Lawrence	Liam Mullone; David Nicholls; Jarlath Regan; James Sherwood (runner-up); Danielle Ward (runner-up)
2005	Tom Allen	Edward Aczel (runner-up); James Branch; Aaron Counter; Sarah Millican (runner-up); John-Luke Roberts
2011	Angela Barnes	Pat Cahill; Tez Ilyas; Joe Lycett; Mark Restuccia; Chris Turner
2012	Lucy Beaumont	Pete Otway; Sunil Patel; Matt Rees; Tommy Rowson; Matthew Winning
2013	Steve Bugeja	Jonny Pelham; Ean Luckhurst; Mark Silcox; Peter Brush; Rob Carter
2014	Lost Voice Guy	Hari Sriskantha; Thomas Ward; Tom Little; Amir Khoshokhan; Brennan Reece
2015	Yuriko Kotani	Russ Peers; Athena Kugblenu; Michael Stranney; Ken Cheng; Andy Storey
2016	Jethro Bradley	Catherine Bohart; George Lewis; Michael Odewale; Lauren Pattison; Sindhu Vee
2017	Heidi Regan	Andy Field; Morgan Rees (Note: Morgan Rees replaced Yumna Mohamed who withdrew due to a family emergency); Jacob Hawley; Aaron Simmonds; Sikisa
2018	Stephen Buchanan	Helen Bauer; Isa Bonachera; Mamoun Elagab; Sarah Mann; William Stone
2019	Janine Harouni	Mo Omar; Josh Jones; Donald Alexander; Hannah Platt
2021	Anna Thomas	Lily Phillips; Celya AB; Liam Farrelly; Molly McGuinness; William Thompson
2022	Dan Tiernan	Dee Allum; Omar Badaway; Robbie McShane; Marjolein Robertson; Joshua Bethania
2023	Joe Kent-Walters (as Frankie Monroe)	Hester Ectomy; Jin Hao Li; Chantel Nash; Dean T Beirne; Paddy Young
2024	Paul Hilleard	Marty Gleeson; Jake Donaldson (Note: Jake Donaldson replaced Marie Goulbourne who died shortly after winning her heat); Dane Buckley; Maia Tassalini; Jonathan Oldfield
2025	Eli Hart	Ayo Adenekan; Jess Carrivick; Shugufta Choudhry; Evaldas Karosas; Pravanya Pillay.
2026	Cormac Sinnott	-
