= Roast Battle =

- Promotional image
- Genre: Comedy; Satire; Stand-up comedy
- Created by: Brian Moses; Jeff Ross
- Written by: Aiden Spackman; Christine Rose; Dan Swimer; Dominic English; Geoff Norcott; James Farmer; Jesse Joyce
- Directed by: Liz Clare
- Presented by: Jimmy Carr
- Judges: Jimmy Carr; Katherine Ryan; Russell Brand; Jonathan Ross
- Announcer: Brian Moses
- Country of origin: United Kingdom
- Original language: British
- No. of series: 4
- No. of episodes: 22

Production
- Executive producers: Brian Moses; Emma Clarke; Gabe Turner; Jeff Ross; Jill Offman; Jimmy Carr; Louise Holmes; Suzi Aplin
- Producer: Mia Cross
- Editors: Andy Kinnear; Jason Boxall; Philip Lepherd

Original release
- Network: Comedy Central
- Release: 15 January 2018 – 17 February 2020

Related
- Comedy Central Roasts; Jeff Ross Presents Roast Battle

Roast Battle is a British roast comedy show that is broadcast on Comedy Central. The show is hosted by Jimmy Carr and features comedians facing each other in roast battles.

The show was created by American comedians Jeff Ross and Brian Moses and is based on their Comedy Central series Jeff Ross Presents Roast Battle on which Carr has appeared as a contestant.

== Concept, format and production ==
Roast Battle is based on Jeff Ross Presents Roast Battle, an American television series created by comedians Jeff Ross and Brian Moses that first aired on Comedy Central in 2016. The American series is based on a live show created by Moses and fellow comedian Rell Battle that runs at The Comedy Store in Los Angeles in the comedy club's Belly Room. Jimmy Carr participated as a contestant in Jeff Ross Presents Roast Battle's first series.

Roast Battle premiered on Comedy Central in the UK and Ireland in 2018. The show is hosted by Carr and Moses acts as the announcer and the referee of each battle. The winner of each battle is determined by a panel of judges, including Carr. In the series' first series Katherine Ryan and Russell Brand served as judges. The second and third series featured Ryan and Jonathan Ross on the judges panel. The fourth series judges panel featured Ryan alongside a different guest judge each episode. These guest judges included Richard Ayoade, Big Narstie, Sara Pascoe, Noel Fielding and Joe Lycett.

The show is recorded at the Electric Brixton nightclub in London and is co-produced by James Corden’s production company Fulwell 73 and Carr's production company Ideasatron.

== Reception ==
Roast Battle became Comedy Central's highest-rated UK commission.

In December 2018, a complaint was upheld by Ofcom after a trailer for the programme featured an anti-Semitic joke delivered by Jimmy Carr towards Tom Rosenthal, the latter of whom is of Jewish descent.

== Episodes ==
=== Overview ===
Series	Episodes	Originally released		Judges
Series	Episodes	First released	Last released	Judges
1	6	15 January 2018	19 January 2018	Jimmy Carr; Russell Brand; Katherine Ryan
2	5	1 October 2018	5 October 2018	Carr; Ryan; Jonathan Ross
Special	1	10 December 2018		Carr; Ryan; Ross
3	5	14 January 2019	18 January 2019	Carr; Ryan; Ross
4	5	20 January 2020	17 February 2020	Carr; Ryan; Guest judges

=== Series 1 ===
No. overall	No. in series	Battle 1	Battle 2	Original release date
1	1	Tom Allen vs Suzi Ruffell	Phil Wang vs Ed Gamble	15 January 2018
2	2	Daniel Sloss vs Desiree Burch	Joe Lycett vs Nick Helm	16 January 2018
3	3	Bobby Mair vs Harriet Kemsley	Dane Baptiste vs Tez Ilyas	17 January 2018
4	4	Sofie Hagen vs Larry Dean	Alex Brooker vs Matt Forde	18 January 2018
5	5	Joel Dommett vs Iain Stirling	Fin Taylor vs Paul Chowdhry	19 January 2018
6	6	Jayde Adams vs Alex Edelman	Mark Steel vs Elliot Steel	19 January 2018

=== Series 2 ===
No. overall	No. in series	Battle 1	Battle 2	Original release date
7	1	Fern Brady vs Ivo Graham	Chris Ramsey vs Tom Rosenthal	1 October 2018
8	2	Alfie Brown vs Jessie Cave	Daniel Sloss vs Phil Wang	2 October 2018
9	3	Catherine Bohart vs Sarah Keyworth	Andrew Maxwell vs Mark Watson	3 October 2018
10	4	Stephen Bailey vs Darren Harriott	Matt Richardson vs Angela Barnes	4 October 2018
11	5	Naz Osmanoglu vs Rose Matafeo	Alex Brooker vs Rosie Jones	5 October 2018

=== Special ===
No.	Episode	Battles 1 & 2	Play-off	Final	Original release date
12	Christmas special	Bobby Mair vs Ed Gamble Suzi Ruffell vs Desiree Burch	Bobby Mair vs Desiree Burch	Suzi Ruffell vs Ed Gamble	10 December 2018

=== Series 3 ===
No. overall	No. in series	Battle 1	Battle 2	Original release date
13	1	Tom Ward vs Darren Harriott	Tom Allen vs Larry Dean	14 January 2019
14	2	Kiri Pritchard-McLean vs Brennan Reece	Alex Edelman vs Joel Dommett	15 January 2019
15	3	Tom Houghton vs Lauren Pattison	Simon Brodkin vs Dane Baptiste	16 January 2019
16	4	Nigel Ng vs Tom Lucy	Johnny Vegas vs Phil Ellis	17 January 2019
17	5	Rhys James vs Lloyd Griffith	Rhys Nicholson vs Felicity Ward	18 January 2019

=== Series 4 ===
No. overall	No. in series	Guest judge	Battle 1	Battle 2	Original release date
18	1	Noel Fielding	Laura Lexx vs Tom Livingstone	Baga Chipz & The Vivienne vs Glamrou & Crystal	20 January 2020
19	2	Big Narstie	Joe Sutherland vs Sophie Duker	Jamie Laing vs Ivo Graham	27 January 2020
20	3	Richard Ayoade	Ed Night vs Huge Davies	Richard Herring vs Sara Barron	3 February 2020
21	4	Joe Lycett	Adam Rowe vs Maisie Adam	Fern Brady vs Phil Wang	10 February 2020
22	5	Sara Pascoe	Dane Baptiste vs Jordan Stephens	Lou Sanders vs Luke McQueen	17 February 2020
