= Keith Carter (comedian) =

British comedian (born 1970)

- Born: Keith Carter; 3 February 1970 (age 56); Liverpool, England
- Occupations: Comedian, writer, blogger
- Writing career
- Genres: Comedy, social commentary
- Website: www.arushoflaughter.co.uk/portfolios/keith-carter/

Keith Carter (born 3 February 1970) is a Liverpool-based comedian, writer, and actor, best known for his comic creation Nige, a caricature of a scallie from Merseyside cited by Sir Jeremy Isaacs as being instrumental in helping Liverpool's successful 2007 Capital of Culture bid.

Carter has been described as "not just a stand-up with a dressing-up box, he makes his characters live by his bearing, his gestures and by his voice".

== Career ==
Carter began his career as a comedian in clubs in Liverpool in 2001. He has developed a number of comic characters, the most famous of which is Nige, who he claims to have based on a scouser queuing up in front of him in a dole queue; other characters Carter has created include Gerald Roberts, an opinionated driver, and Colin Kilkelly, who thinks he is Liverpool's answer to Enrique Iglesias. Carter has made a number of appearances at the Edinburgh Fringe Festival and has been nominee and winner of a number of awards. His appearance in Under the Mud was described by The Guardian as an almost show stealing performance. In 2008 he co-wrote the play The Berserker Boys with fellow Liverpudlian comedian Stanley McHale. The play premièred at the Unity Theatre in February 2008.

== TV Credits ==
Domestic, BBC 2 (2002)

Comedy Shuffle, BBC 3 (written and performed) (2007)

It's Adam and Shelley, BBC 3 (2007)

Meet The Blogs, ITV (2008)

Scallywagga, BBC 3 (2008)

Tonightly, Channel 4 (2008)

== Radio Credits ==
Loose Ends, BBC Radio (2004)

The Gerald Roberts Radio Show, BBC Radio (2005)

How I Won The Capital of Culture by Nige, BBC Radio (2005)

Deck of Friends, BBC Radio (playwright) (2005)

== Film Credits ==
Under the Mud (2007).

== Awards and nominations ==
- 2008 Daily Post Arts Award
- 2003 Liverpool Echo Comedian of the Year
- 2005 North West Breakthrough Comedian of the Year
- 2001 BBC New Comedy Awards, finalist
