= Frankie Boyle's New World Order =

- Also known as: New World Order
- Genre: Satire; Talk show
- Created by: Frankie Boyle
- Written by: Frankie Boyle
- Directed by: Barbara Wiltshere
- Presented by: Frankie Boyle
- Starring: Sara Pascoe; Miles Jupp; Katherine Ryan; Mona Chalabi; Kiri Pritchard-McLean; Sophie Duker; Jamali Maddix
- Country of origin: United Kingdom
- Original language: English
- No. of series: 6
- No. of episodes: 41 (6 specials + 5 clip show episodes)

Production
- Producers: Tom Baker, Christopher Barbour
- Running time: 30 minutes (Election special 40 minutes, Review of the year specials 45 minutes)
- Production company: Zeppotron

Original release
- Network: BBC Two
- Release: 8 June 2017 – 27 December 2022

Frankie Boyle's New World Order is a British comedy television programme created, written and presented by Frankie Boyle. Premiering in 2017 on BBC Two, it followed his BBC iPlayer-exclusive "Autopsy" shows. After a few minutes of stand-up, he makes two statements and discusses them with his guests. Boyle summarises each debate in a short monologue to camera. The programme finishes with Boyle sitting against the desk delivering a final longer monologue to camera.

Throughout its six series, regular guests included Sara Pascoe, Katherine Ryan, Mona Chalabi, Miles Jupp, Sophie Duker and Kiri Pritchard-McLean. The show also had annual specials that review news of the year. The show was cancelled on 23 March 2023.

== Production ==
Following on from his BBC iPlayer-exclusive "Autopsy" shows, New World Order airs as prime time TV on BBC Two. It follows a very similar structure to Boyle's "Autopsy"; instead of the studio audience voting in agreement or disagreement with the thesis, however, Boyle summarises the debate in a short monologue to camera. The show premiered on 8 June 2017.

The show returned for a review of the year on 29 December 2017 as Frankie Boyle's 2017 New World Order. The second series of seven episodes started on 18 May 2018. The data journalist Mona Chalabi became a regular in this series. Another end-of-year review show, Frankie Boyle's 2018 New World Order, was broadcast on 27 December 2018. A third series began on 29 March 2019. Ryan was not in this series, having left the show. An end-of-year review show, Frankie Boyle's 2019 New World Order, was broadcast on 30 December 2019. A fourth series that debuted on 3 September 2020 was followed by a 2020 review show on 1 January 2021. In September 2021, Boyle announced that the show would return for a fifth series the following month, recorded in Glasgow.

Boyle spoke about the writing and filming process for series six in July 2022. He said that he would workshop material for the series in the Glee Club, Glasgow from July to the recording—this includes the closing monologues, co-authored by Charlie Skelton. He planned around 40 "warm-up shows" to practice jokes. Boyle said: "there's often a bit at the start where there's three big jokes that lead you in", to "try and get [the audience] on board and create some confidence with them".

Boyle announced in March 2023 that the BBC had cancelled the series, saying that this was "not surprising in the current climate, I suppose". A writer for Chortle commented that the BBC was potentially shifting prioritisation away from panel shows and towards scripted comedy, and that New World Order's viewership had declined over time. However, the writer and The Independent's Louis Chilton connected it to criticisms that the BBC was avoiding content that was critical of the current government.

== Episode list ==
=== Series 1 (2017) ===
As with the Autopsy shows, Sara Pascoe and Katherine Ryan were regulars for the first series.

Episode	Original broadcast	Regulars	Guests	Propositions discussed
1	8 June 2017 (Note: Election special, 40 minutes)	Sara Pascoe and Miles Jupp (Note: Katherine Ryan was unable to attend the recording of this episode.)	Lucy Prebble and Nish Kumar	"The Political System Hates Us"
1	8 June 2017	Sara Pascoe and Miles Jupp	Lucy Prebble and Nish Kumar	"The Media Is A Huge Obstacle To Meaningful Democracy"
2	16 June 2017	Sara Pascoe and Katherine Ryan	Rob Delaney and Mona Chalabi	"Theresa May Has Been Given A Strong Mandate To Fuck Off"
2	16 June 2017	Sara Pascoe and Katherine Ryan	Rob Delaney and Mona Chalabi	"Donald Trump Will Save The World"
3	30 June 2017	Sara Pascoe and Katherine Ryan	Benjamin Zephaniah and Dane Baptiste	"Hope Is Dead"
3	30 June 2017	Sara Pascoe and Katherine Ryan	Benjamin Zephaniah and Dane Baptiste	"Brexit Will Be Christmas For Racists"
4	14 July 2017	Sara Pascoe and Katherine Ryan	Romesh Ranganathan and Desiree Burch	"We Are All About To Disappear in a Ball of Nuclear Light"
4	14 July 2017	Sara Pascoe and Katherine Ryan	Romesh Ranganathan and Desiree Burch	"Our 'Lives' Are Being Ruined By Technology"

=== Special (2017) ===
Episode	Original broadcast	Regulars	Guests	Propositions discussed
2017	29 December 2017	Sara Pascoe and Katherine Ryan	Miles Jupp and Mona Chalabi	"2017 Is The Year No One Will Look Back on Fondly, Because We'll All Be Dead"

=== Series 2 (2018) ===
The series returned with Boyle, Pascoe and Ryan joined by the data journalist Mona Chalabi for the first half of the series. For the second half, Miles Jupp took over as a regular in place of Ryan. Chalabi was absent from the second half of the series.

Episode	Original broadcast	Regulars	Guests	Propositions discussed
1	18 May 2018	Sara Pascoe, Katherine Ryan and Mona Chalabi	David Baddiel and Joe Lycett	"In 4 Years' Time, Labour Will Lose Britain's Last Ever General Election"
1	18 May 2018	Sara Pascoe, Katherine Ryan and Mona Chalabi	David Baddiel and Joe Lycett	"We Have 12 Hours Left To Abolish The Monarchy"
2	25 May 2018	Sara Pascoe, Katherine Ryan and Mona Chalabi	Akala and Ahir Shah	"Britain Is Entering A Golden Age of Racism"
2	25 May 2018	Sara Pascoe, Katherine Ryan and Mona Chalabi	Akala and Ahir Shah	"Donald Trump Will Be The World's First Crowdfunded Assassination"
3	1 June 2018	Sara Pascoe, Katherine Ryan and Mona Chalabi	Holly Walsh and Jack Carroll	"The Tory Party Will Put A Dying Britain Out of Its Misery"
3	1 June 2018	Sara Pascoe, Katherine Ryan and Mona Chalabi	Holly Walsh and Jack Carroll	"All Social Media Will Achieve Is To Cause The Aliens Who Find Our Remains To Hate Us"
4	8 June 2018	Sara Pascoe and Miles Jupp	Doug Stanhope and Richard Osman	"Humanity Doesn't Deserve The Mercy of an Apocalypse"
4	8 June 2018	Sara Pascoe and Miles Jupp	Doug Stanhope and Richard Osman	"Everyone Older Than Me Can Fuck Off"
5	15 June 2018	Sara Pascoe and Miles Jupp	Romesh Ranganathan and Desiree Burch	"Elites Aren't All Bad... Is One of the Things You'll Soon Learn in a Re-Education Camp"
5	15 June 2018	Sara Pascoe and Miles Jupp	Romesh Ranganathan and Desiree Burch	"The Final Weeks of Life on Earth Will Seem More Like 1000 Years"
6	22 June 2018	Sara Pascoe and Miles Jupp	Roisin Conaty and Lucy Prebble	"Democracies Hate Voters"
6	22 June 2018	Sara Pascoe and Miles Jupp	Roisin Conaty and Lucy Prebble	"Science Won't Save Us"
7	29 June 2018	Unseen & Best Bits (series 2 compilation episode)		

=== Special (2018) ===
Episode	Original broadcast	Regulars	Guests	Propositions discussed
2018	27 December 2018	Miles Jupp and Mona Chalabi (Note: Sara Pascoe was unable to attend the recording of this episode.)	Angela Barnes and Jamali Maddix	"2018 – The Year When Aretha Franklin Had A Better Year Than You"

=== Series 3 (2019) ===
Episode	Original broadcast	Regulars	Guests	Propositions discussed
1	29 March 2019 (Note: This episode was broadcast on Friday rather than series three's regular Thursday slot. It is possible that this episode was intended as a Brexit special as 29 March 2019 was originally announced as the date of the United Kingdom's exit from the European Union.)	Sara Pascoe (Note: Miles Jupp was unable to attend the recording of these episodes due to starring in the play The Life I Lead.)	Lucy Prebble, Kiri Pritchard-McLean and Jason Williamson	"Brexit. Something something. The EU something something. Probably."
2	4 April 2019	Sara Pascoe	Richard Osman, Desiree Burch and Afua Hirsch	"Artificial Intelligence Will Solve All Our Problems, Starting with the Problem of Being Alive"
2	4 April 2019	Sara Pascoe	Richard Osman, Desiree Burch and Afua Hirsch	"Free Speech Is Vital. Without It I Would Struggle To Describe My Hate Crimes to My Children"
3	11 April 2019	Sara Pascoe and Miles Jupp	Kiri Pritchard-McLean, Jen Brister and George Monbiot	"It's Time Patriarchy Stepped Back into The Shadows of Power, And Pretended To Give Some Authority To Women"
3	11 April 2019	Sara Pascoe and Miles Jupp	Kiri Pritchard-McLean, Jen Brister and George Monbiot	"Why Worry About Climate Change When The Earth Is A Pointless Ball of Shit?"
4	18 April 2019	Sara Pascoe and Miles Jupp	Kiri Pritchard-McLean, Grace Blakeley and Eshaan Akbar	"At Last, We Are Finally Approaching The End of the First Stage of the Preliminary Phase of the Opening Chapter of Part One of Brexit"
4	18 April 2019	Sara Pascoe and Miles Jupp	Kiri Pritchard-McLean, Grace Blakeley and Eshaan Akbar	"Luckily We Have Reared Children So Awful They're Getting The Planet They Deserve"
5	25 April 2019	Sara Pascoe and Miles Jupp	Rob Delaney, Sara Barron and Sophie Duker	"Donald Trump Is Just A Human Being Who Wants To Be Loved, By His Daughter"
5	25 April 2019	Sara Pascoe and Miles Jupp	Rob Delaney, Sara Barron and Sophie Duker	"Like Every Other Panel Show, Let's Discuss Guy Debord's Theory Of 'The Spectacle'"
6	2 May 2019	Sara Pascoe and Miles Jupp	Jon Richardson, Fern Brady and Kerry Godliman	"Let's Look Forward to a Summer of Blue Skies, Riots And Domestic Terror"
6	2 May 2019	Sara Pascoe and Miles Jupp	Jon Richardson, Fern Brady and Kerry Godliman	"War! Heugh. What Is It Good For? Growing The Economy And Being Torn Apart at a Sub-Atomic Level"
7	9 May 2019	Unseen & Best Bits (series 3 compilation episode)		

=== Special (2019) ===
Episode	Original broadcast	Regulars	Guests	Propositions discussed
2019	30 December 2019	Sara Pascoe and Miles Jupp	Kiri Pritchard-McLean and Jamali Maddix	"2019: A Year In Which Epstein Didn't Kill Himself"

=== Series 4 (2020) ===
This series was filmed without a studio audience, with a revised socially-distanced set due to COVID-19.

Episode	Original broadcast	Regulars	Guests	Propositions discussed
1	3 September 2020	Sara Pascoe, Miles Jupp and Sophie Duker	Guz Khan and Sara Barron	"Covid 19 Will Eventually Bring The People Of Britain Closer Together, In Our Mass Graves"
1	3 September 2020	Sara Pascoe, Miles Jupp and Sophie Duker	Guz Khan and Sara Barron	"The US Election Will Decide Who Rules The Burning Embers Of America From A Morphine Drip In A Concrete Silo"
2	10 September 2020	Sara Pascoe, Sophie Duker and Jamali Maddix	Dane Baptiste and Jen Brister	"Black Lives Matter Glosses Over The Complexities Of A World Where We All Need To Come Together And Kill Whitey"
2	10 September 2020	Sara Pascoe, Sophie Duker and Jamali Maddix	Dane Baptiste and Jen Brister	"We're Living Through Whatever Is The Opposite Of A Golden Age Of Political Talent"
3	17 September 2020	Sara Pascoe, Miles Jupp and Kiri Pritchard-McLean	Dr Isabel Millar	"Ghislaine Maxwell Didn't Kill Herself"
3	17 September 2020	Sara Pascoe, Miles Jupp and Kiri Pritchard-McLean	Dr Isabel Millar	""Reality" Is "Dead""
4	24 September 2020	Miles Jupp, Sophie Duker and Jamali Maddix	Victoria Coren Mitchell and Romesh Ranganathan	"We Have No Need To Fear Technology, Is Something You'll Be Convinced Of By Drugged Nano-Porridge In A Robot Concentration Camp"
4	24 September 2020	Miles Jupp, Sophie Duker and Jamali Maddix	Victoria Coren Mitchell and Romesh Ranganathan	"Now That It's Too Late To Stop It, Should We Just Stop Talking About The Climate Apocalypse? Discuss."
5	1 October 2020	Miles Jupp, Kiri Pritchard-McLean and Jamali Maddix	Grace Blakeley and Blindboy Boatclub	"The Union Is Over And England Will Be Fine On Its Own, Unless There's A Massive Recession For Some Reason"
5	1 October 2020	Miles Jupp, Kiri Pritchard-McLean and Jamali Maddix	Grace Blakeley and Blindboy Boatclub	"Capitalism Is Dead"
6	8 October 2020	Sara Pascoe, Kiri Pritchard-McLean and Sophie Duker	Armando Iannucci and Rosie Jones	"The US Election Is The System Trying To Explain To Us That It Doesn't Work"
6	8 October 2020	Sara Pascoe, Kiri Pritchard-McLean and Sophie Duker	Armando Iannucci and Rosie Jones	"The Future Looks Promising, So Long As We All Manage To Transcend Matter In The Next Three Months"
7	15 October 2020	Unseen & Best Bits (series 4 compilation episode)		

=== Special (2020/2021) ===
Episode	Original broadcast	Regulars	Guests	Propositions discussed
2020	1 January 2021	Miles Jupp, Sophie Duker & Kiri Pritchard-McLean	Holly Walsh, Rob Delaney and Ken Cheng	"The Funniest Thing To Happen In 2020 Was The Prince Andrew Interview In 2019"

=== Series 5 (2021) ===
Filmed in front of a live studio audience in Glasgow.

Episode	Original broadcast	Regulars	Guests	Propositions discussed
1	25 October 2021	Miles Jupp, Sophie Duker and Kiri Pritchard-McLean	Erika Ehler and Rob Delaney	"We're Living in the Blooper Reel at the End of British History"
1	25 October 2021	Miles Jupp, Sophie Duker and Kiri Pritchard-McLean	Erika Ehler and Rob Delaney	"Billionaires Deserve to Die on Mars"
2	1 November 2021	Miles Jupp, Sophie Duker and Ahir Shah	Susie McCabe and Lowkey	"Imagine Voting for Keir Starmer"
2	1 November 2021	Miles Jupp, Sophie Duker and Ahir Shah	Susie McCabe and Lowkey	"Being in the Taliban Looks Like a Laugh"
3	8 November 2021	Miles Jupp, Desiree Burch and Kiri Pritchard-McLean	George Monbiot, Katie Gallogly-Swan and Rosie Jones	"The Earth Is Dead and We've Killed It"
4	15 November 2021	Miles Jupp, Kiri Pritchard-McLean and Jamali Maddix	Susie McCabe and Olga Koch	"Soon, the Shithole That Is the UK Will Break Up into Four Separate Shitholes"
4	15 November 2021	Miles Jupp, Kiri Pritchard-McLean and Jamali Maddix	Susie McCabe and Olga Koch	"Technology: Helping Humanity to Record Its Death Spasms as It Goes Hurtling Into the Abyss"
5	22 November 2021	Miles Jupp, Sophie Duker and Ahir Shah	Munya Chawawa and Sara Barron	"Thank God We're Entering the Final 50 Years of Boris Johnson's Government"
5	22 November 2021	Miles Jupp, Sophie Duker and Ahir Shah	Munya Chawawa and Sara Barron	"Prince Andrew Isn't Even the Worst Royal"
6	29 November 2021	Miles Jupp, Sophie Duker and Kiri Pritchard-McLean	Rob Delaney	"Let's Sit Back and Enjoy the Death of the United States"
6	29 November 2021	Miles Jupp, Sophie Duker and Kiri Pritchard-McLean	Rob Delaney	"Soon COVID, the Economy, and Climate Will All Be Sorted Out by the Destruction of Humanity in an All-Consuming Apocalypse"
7	29 December 2021	Unseen & Best Bits (series 5 compilation episode)		

=== Special (2021) ===
Episode	Original broadcast	Guests	Propositions discussed
2021	29 December 2021	Sophie Duker, Miles Jupp, Jamali Maddix and Susie McCabe	"On the Bright Side, We're Only Seven Variants from Communism"

=== Series 6 (2022) ===
Filmed in front of a live studio audience in Glasgow.

Episode	Original broadcast	Guests	Propositions discussed
1	25 October 2022	Sophie Duker, Josie Long, Susie McCabe and Richard Osman	"Whoever is Prime Minister When This Show Goes Out Should Resign"
1	25 October 2022	Sophie Duker, Josie Long, Susie McCabe and Richard Osman	"The Monarchy Has No Place in a Decent Society, Which is Why It Works So Well in Britain"
2	1 November 2022	Sophie Duker, Rosie Jones, Jamali Maddix and Ahir Shah	"If It's Any Consolation, the Sun Will Explode in 4 Billion Years and None of This Will Matter"
2	1 November 2022	Sophie Duker, Rosie Jones, Jamali Maddix and Ahir Shah	"Nothing Can Stop Labour Winning the Next Election, and the Name of That Nothing is Keir Starmer"
3	8 November 2022	Alex Brooker, Desiree Burch, Nish Kumar and Laura Smyth	"Britain? More Like Shitain."
3	8 November 2022	Alex Brooker, Desiree Burch, Nish Kumar and Laura Smyth	"Billionaires Are Just Like the Rest of Us - Living on a Planet Fucked by Billionaires"
4	15 November 2022	Rob Delaney, Jamali Maddix, Susie McCabe and Kiri Pritchard-McLean	"I Can Imagine a Future Where Humanity Solves the Climate Crisis Because I Am on Powerful Medication"
4	15 November 2022	Rob Delaney, Jamali Maddix, Susie McCabe and Kiri Pritchard-McLean	"To America's Leaders After the Next Election I Say This: 中国是一个美好的国家"
5	22 November 2022	Desiree Burch, Sophie Duker, Josie Long and Thanyia Moore	"Now is the Time to Protest in the Streets, Because They're Warmer Than Your Houses"
5	22 November 2022	Desiree Burch, Sophie Duker, Josie Long and Thanyia Moore	"If You're Feeling Cold This Winter Don't Worry, You'll Soon Be Nice and Warm in a Crematorium Oven"
6	29 November 2022	Christopher Macarthur-Boyd, Jamali Maddix, Susie McCabe and Kiri Pritchard-McLean	"England Will Win the World Cup and the Subsequent Wave of Nationalism Will Usher in 40 Years of Fascism"
6	29 November 2022	Christopher Macarthur-Boyd, Jamali Maddix, Susie McCabe and Kiri Pritchard-McLean	"We're Fucked"
7	6 December 2022	Unseen & Best Bits (series 6 compilation episode)	

=== Special (2022) ===
Episode	Original broadcast	Guests	Propositions discussed
2022	27 December 2022	Sophie Duker, Miles Jupp, Jamali Maddix and Kiri Pritchard-McLean	"2022 Was a Great Year, for Anyone Who Got 2022 in the 'World's Shittest Year' Sweepstake"

== Most appearances ==
Up to and including 27 December 2022 (excludes the 5 "Unseen & Best Bits" episodes).

24 appearances

- Miles Jupp

22 appearances

- Sara Pascoe

15 appearances

- Sophie Duker
- Kiri Pritchard-McLean

11 appearances

- Jamali Maddix

8 appearances

- Katherine Ryan

6 appearances

- Desiree Burch
- Mona Chalabi
- Rob Delaney
- Susie McCabe

4 appearances

- Ahir Shah

3 appearances

- Sara Barron
- Rosie Jones
- Richard Osman
- Lucy Prebble
- Romesh Ranganathan

== Reception ==
The show was nominated for the best Entertainment Performance BAFTA in 2020.

The Independent's Louis Chilton commented on the show's legacy upon its cancellation, which he deemed "a profound disappointment". Chilton said that it was "one of the few shows on TV that was sincerely and unapologetically left-wing", with criticisms of Keir Starmer and tacit agreement for revolution, though centrist guests could also air their views. Chilton praised the show's "diverse roster of rotating guests", which included guest lineups that were entirely female or non-white, and gave opportunities to lesser-known comedians.
