= Eshaan Akbar =

English comedian, writer and actor (born 1984)

- Born: 14 August 1984 (age 42); Whitechapel, London, England
- Education: Queen Mary University of London (BA); Birkbeck, University of London (MA)
- Occupations: Comedian; broadcaster
- Years active: 2014–present
- Website: eshaanakbar.com

Eshaan Akbar (/ˈiːʃæn/; born 14 August 1984) is a British-Asian comedian, writer and actor.

== Early life ==
Akbar is an English person of Pakistani and Bangladeshi ancestry. Born in Whitechapel, east London, he moved with his family to Essex where he attended Forest School, a private Church of England school in Snaresbrook. Akbar studied Economics, Finance and Management at Queen Mary University of London and worked in wealth management until the Great Recession. He then completed a master's degree in Global Governance and Public Policy at Birkbeck College, University of London, where his dissertation focused on UK aid provision in the 21st century.

He also worked at the London Borough of Merton Council and HSBC. He also had stints at the British Heart Foundation and Anthony Nolan. Akbar has also worked as a Bollywood dance choreographer and journalist.

== Career ==
Eshaan Akbar began performing stand-up in 2014 doing five-minute spots at open mic nights like We Are Funny Project and the Comedy Cafe. He made the final of the So You Think You're Funny competition and Laughing Horse in that same year. In 2016, he supported Micky Flanagan on his warm up tour. He has gone on to support Dane Baptiste, Hal Cruttenden, Rory Bremner, Jan Ravens, Sindhu Vee, and Jason Manford.

On TV, he has appeared on Live At The Apollo, The Big Asian Stand-Up, Frankie Boyle's New World Order, Mock the Week, QI, The Big Asian Stand-Up Night, Sunday Morning Live and has written for Rob Rinder's Good Year, Bad Year.

On radio, he hosted a regular Saturday afternoon show on the BBC Asian Network, including stints covering The Breakfast Show and Drivetime. He is also the host for the award-winning Nine Twenty Nine podcast for Fiverr and the But Where Are You Really From? podcast for the BBC. He created Panic Room, an Audible podcast, presenting alongside John Robins and Olga Koch.

He is "a proud hearing aid wearer" and has been a Celebrity Ambassador for the Royal National Institute for Deaf People (a.k.a. Action on Hearing Loss) since 2019.

Akbar starred as Principal Lakhani in season four of the Netflix series Sex Education. Akbar played the character of Mahmoud in the 2021 short film Sometime Else, written and directed by James Cleave.

He appeared as one of the seven pilgrims in the Pilgrimage TV series, in March 2024, who took on the North Wales Pilgrim's Way. He identifies himself as a lapsed Muslim, saying that the death of his mother led him to question seriously his faith.

In 2024, Akbar appeared in ITV's comedy travelogue series Evil Escapes, which was nominated for a Broadcast Digital Award.
