= Catherine Bohart =

Irish comedian, writer and actor

- Bohart at the 2026 Edinburgh Festival Fringe
- Born: 13 August 1988 (age 38); Dublin, Ireland
- Education: Trinity College Dublin, Royal Central School of Speech and Drama
- Occupations: comedian, writer, actor
- Years active: 2014–present
- Website: catherinebohart.com

Catherine Bohart (/ˈboʊhɑːrt/; born Catherine Murphy 13 August 1988) is an Irish stand-up comedian, writer and actor based in East London.

== Early life ==
Catherine Murphy grew up in Clonsilla, Fingal, part of the greater Dublin area, the daughter of a Catholic deacon. She studied law at University College Dublin for one year before dropping out. She then studied French and History at Trinity College. Bohart then went on to the Royal Central School of Speech and Drama in London, receiving an MA in Acting for Screen.

Before entering stand-up comedy, Bohart had been involved in debate throughout secondary school and college, even taking on a job in debate education during her early days as a stand up. As a debater representing Trinity College Dublin, she was judged top speaker in Europe at the European Universities Debating Championships in 2011.

== Career ==
Bohart began working in stand-up in 2014. She was a finalist for the 2016 BBC New Comedy Award and for the 2018 Leicester Mercury Comedian of the Year.

Bohart has written for The Now Show, The News Quiz and Frankie Boyle's New World Order, and has supported Ellie Taylor and Nish Kumar on tour.

She had her professional breakthrough at the 2018 Edinburgh Festival with her show, Immaculate, which was subsequently released as a special on Amazon Prime UK. She then took the show to London and on a national tour. Her second show, Lemon, premiered at the 2019 Edinburgh Festival, followed by a UK and Ireland tour. Her subsequent shows have included This isn't for you and Again with Feelings. Again with Feelings was nominated for Best show at the 2024 Edinburgh Comedy Awards and subsequently released as a special on Bohart's and Soho Theatre's YouTube Channels. 2026 will see Bohart embark on a UK and Ireland tour of her new show Borrowing Trouble.

She has appeared on TV on Live at the Apollo, The Blame Game, The Stand Up Sketch Show, The Mash Report, Roast Battle, 8 Out of 10 Cats, Alan Davies: As Yet Untitled, Jon Richardson: Ultimate Worrier, Celebrity Mastermind, Richard Osman's House of Games, The Last Leg, QI, Unacceptable, Iain Stirling's Roast of the Internet, and Mock the Week. In 2024, she starred in LOL:Last One Laughing Ireland on Amazon Prime. She features, as an actor, in the RTÉ tv show These Sacred Vows.

She is a frequent guest on Deborah Frances-White's The Guilty Feminist podcast. In 2019, Bohart hosted the "Funny from the Fringe" podcast for BBC Radio 4 Extra. In 2020, during the COVID-19 pandemic, Bohart and her then-girlfriend Sarah Keyworth made a podcast about "what makes relationships work" entitled You'll Do. During lockdown in the United Kingdom, Catherine Bohart, along with Helen Bauer, and Andrew White started an online comedy program in which audience members could purchase tickets through Bohart's personal website to access the online comedy set either through Zoom or YouTube livestream. The comedy program is called Gigless. Gigless won the Chortle Award for Legend of Lockdown.

Bohart co-hosted podcast Trusty Hogs with fellow comedian Helen Bauer from September 2021 to August 2025.

In 2024 and 2025, Bohart was the lead in the comedy show TL;DR for BBC Radio 4, taking a look back at recent news events.

In 2026, Bohart launched a podcast focused on the TV show Heated Rivalry, called Tonsil Hockey, which she co-hosts with Olga Koch. Tonsil Hockey won the 2026 Golden Lobes Best New Show award.

== Personal life ==
Bohart is bisexual. She previously dated Sarah Keyworth, a fellow stand-up comedian. They met in 2015 and lived together in Kilburn, London, eventually breaking up in 2020. She has been in a relationship with actor and comedian Ellen Robertson since 2022. Bohart has spoken openly about living with obsessive-compulsive disorder.
