= Mark Simmons (comedian) =

British comedian

Mark Simmons (born January 1985) is an English comedian, known for his one-liners, who won the UK's Comics Comic Award in 2022, and U&Dave's Joke of the Fringe Award in 2024.

== Career ==
Before working as a comedian, Simmons worked in a gym. He started his comedy career in 2008 supporting Sean Walsh. Simmons is known for his one-liners.

Simmons has appeared on UK panel show Mock the Week and produces the Jokes with Mark Simmons podcast. One of his jokes was voted the second funniest at the Edinburgh Fridge in 2022. At the festival he was compared to Tim Vine and Gary Delaney and was praised for his audience engagement. Time Out compared his performance to Milton Jones and Noel Fielding.

Simmons won the Comics Comic Award in 2022 and in 2024 was awarded Funniest Joke of the Fringe at the Edinburgh Fringe Festival.

Simmons was friends with Gareth Richards who died in April 2023. At the Edinburgh Fringe Festival 2023 alongside comedian friend Danny Ward, Simmons staged "A Show for Gareth Richards" with Frank Skinner, Stewart Lee and Jack Whitehall. The show won the first Victoria Wood award at the Edinburgh Comedy Awards 2023 and raised almost £20,000 for Gareth's family.

== Personal life ==
Simmons is from Canterbury and was born in January 1985.
