= Athena Kugblenu =

British stand-up comedian

- Born: 14 November 1981 (age 44); London, England
- Education: University of Birmingham
- Occupation: Comedian
- Years active: 2012–present
- Website: athenakugblenu.co.uk

Athena Kugblenu (/kəˈblɛnjuː/; born 14 November 1981) is a British stand-up comedian and writer.

== Early life ==
Kugblenu describes herself as mixed-race: half Indo-Guyanese and half Ghanaian. Kugblenu studied at the University of Birmingham. She worked as a project manager in London before breaking into comedy. She has a twin brother.

== Career ==
In 2015, Kugblenu was a finalist in the BBC New Comedy Awards.

In 2017, Kugblenu performed at the Johannesburg international Comedy Festival and followed that with her debut hour, KMT, at the Edinburgh Fringe. Her second celebrated hour was the political show Follow the Leader. She has supported Daliso Chaponda, Nish Kumar and Fern Brady on tour.

On television, Kugblenu has appeared on Sam Delaney's News Thing, The Dog Ate My Homework, The Big Night In, Mock the Week, Who said that?, Girl on Girl, When News Goes Horribly Wrong, The Funny Haha Survival Guide. In 2020, she performed at the Stampdown Comedy Night.

Kugbenlu writes for Frankie Boyle's New World Order, Horrible Histories, The Russell Howard Hour, Radio 4's The Lenny Henry Show, Dead Ringers, The News Quiz, Newsjack, The Now Show and is a lead writer for the multi-cultural sketch show Sketchtopia. She also contributes to Children's BBC shows The Amelia Gething Complex and Swashbuckle. She has also written for magazines and newspapers such as The Guardian, Time Out and Stylist Magazine and makes regular appearances on BBC Radio 5 Live and Talk Radio.

On the radio, she has appeared on The News Quiz, the Radio Four Extra Comedy Club, Arts Club and The Museum of Curiosity. Kugblenu hosts the podcast Keeping Athena Company and is a regular co-host on The Guilty Feminist and Loose Ends and panelist on BBC Scotland’s Breaking the News. She has also appeared on Richard Herring's Edinburgh Fringe Podcast and Stars In Your Ears.

Kugblenu is a member of the BBC Comedy Room 2019/20 and was awarded the BBC Felix Dexter Bursary for BAME up-and-coming comedy writers in 2020. Moreover, she is a nominee for the 99 Club Female Comedians’ Bursary and a former BBC New Comedy Award Finalist. Kugblenu was nominated for the 2015 BBC New Comedy Award.

She is a founding member of Do the Right Scene, a London-based improv group who run monthly shows and workshops in London and perform across the UK.
