= Daniel Sloss =

English-born Scottish comedian (born 1990)

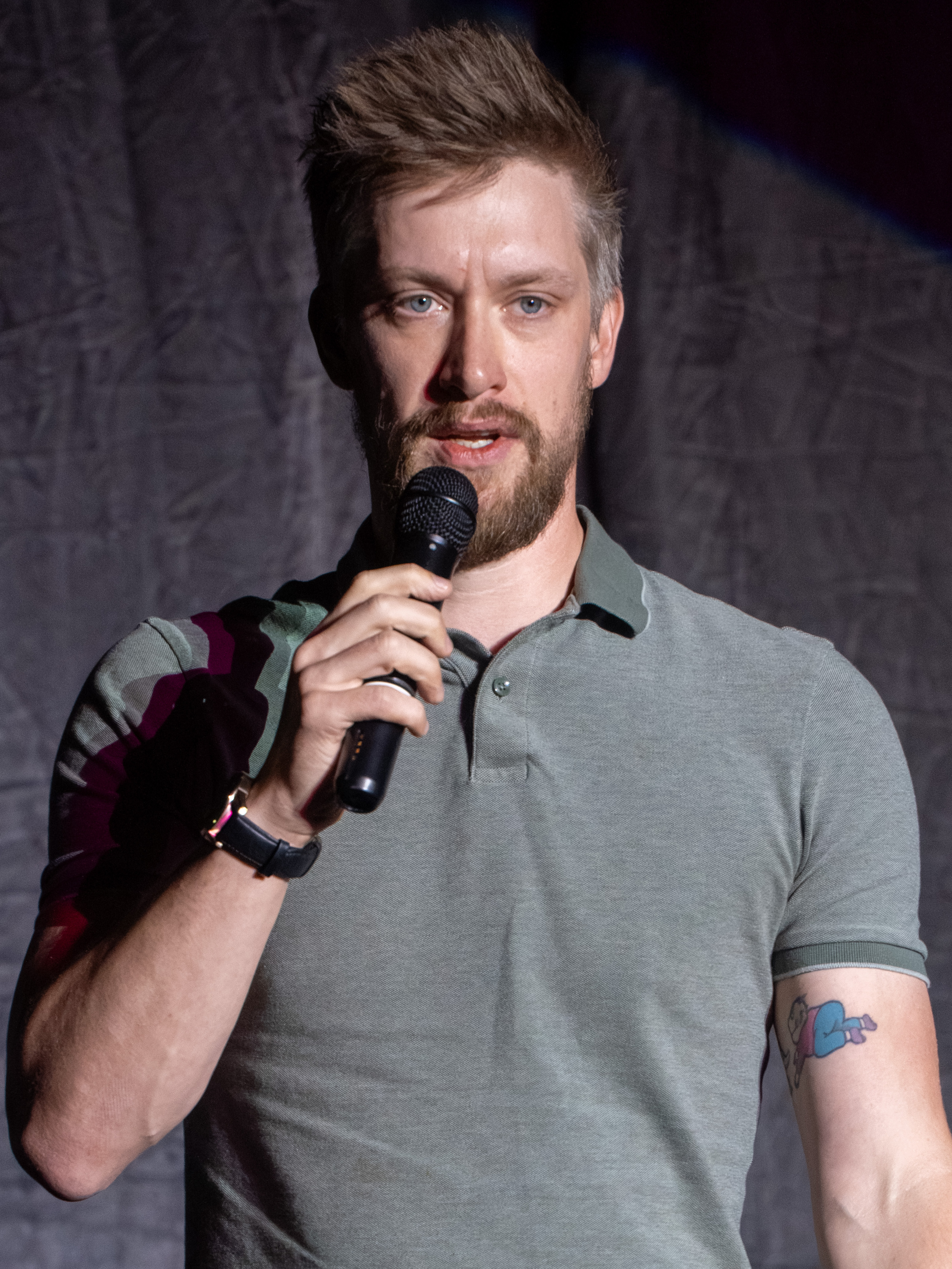
- Sloss at the 2025 Edinburgh Festival Fringe
- Born: 11 September 1990 (age 36); Kingston upon Thames, England
- Occupation: Comedian
- Years active: 2007–present
- Spouse: Kara Mitchell (m. 2023)
- Children: 2
- Website: danielsloss.com

Daniel Sloss (born 11 September 1990) is a Scottish stand-up comedian.

Sloss was the youngest comedian to perform a solo season in London's West End, at the age of 19. He has toured internationally, released a stand-up comedy DVD through BBC Worldwide's 2Entertain label when he was 20, and appeared on U.S. television shows such as Conan and The Late Late Show with Craig Ferguson.

In 2018, Sloss simultaneously released two hour-long comedy specials called DARK and Jigsaw via Netflix under the collective title Daniel Sloss – Live Shows, which received critical acclaim.

== Early life ==
Sloss was born to Scottish parents in Kingston upon Thames, England, on 11 September 1990, the oldest of four children. He has two younger brothers, Matthew and Jack. His sister, Josie, was born with cerebral palsy and died at age 7. He moved with his family to Scotland at the age of four, settling in Fife. He attended East Wemyss Primary School and Waid Academy in Anstruther.

Sloss was offered a place at the University of Dundee to study history, but decided to take a gap year to see if he could make comedy work as a full-time career.

== Comedy career ==
=== Stand up ===
When Sloss was sixteen, he was put in contact by his mother with comedian Frankie Boyle, who performed at a conference she was attending. After asking him for work experience, Sloss received coaching by Boyle during his run at the 2007 Edinburgh Festival Fringe, and also wrote jokes for Boyle on BBC's Mock the Week. He credits Boyle for his initial success. In October 2007, Sloss performed his first stage gig at The Stand in Edinburgh, which lasted five minutes.

He performed his first show called "Life in 2D" at the Edinburgh Festival Fringe in 2008 alongside fellow comic Davey See, which ran for 10 days as part of the Free Fringe. The same year, aged 17, Sloss reached the final at the comedy competition So You Think You're Funny?, which is hosted by the Gilded Balloon venue during the Edinburgh Fringe. In 2009, he sold out his debut full-length Edinburgh Festival Fringe season Daniel Sloss – Teenage Kicks and in October took this show to London to the Soho Theatre to become the youngest comedian to perform a solo season in the venue as well as in London's West End.

In August 2010, Sloss's second solo show Daniel Sloss: My Generation sold out the entire run at Edinburgh Festival Fringe. The show later transferred to London for a season at the Soho Theatre in September before returning to London during the tour playing at the Bloomsbury Theatre in November. This show became his first ever headline live tour, and went on to tour Scotland throughout the autumn of 2010.

In August 2011, Sloss premiered his new show Daniel Sloss – The Joker at the Edinburgh Festival Fringe, selling out a nearly four-week run in the new 400-seat Assembly Theatre venue, still aged just 20. This was followed by a 50-date national tour in the autumn.

In 2012, he performed a 50-date UK tour of Daniel Sloss – The Show.

In August 2013, he launched his new show Daniel Sloss – Stand-Up at the Edinburgh fringe, again with an extended season at the Edinburgh International Conference Centre and again followed by a substantial autumn tour throughout the UK. He subsequently performed this show at 2014's Sydney International Comedy Festival and Perth International Comedy Festival.

In August 2014, his new show Daniel Sloss – Really...?! premiered at the Edinburgh fringe, again with an extended season at the Edinburgh International Conference Centre, followed by a substantial European tour of 20 shows in 15 countries in the autumn as well as UK dates.

In 2015, Daniel wrote and subsequently performed his 7th show at the Edinburgh Festival Fringe DARK. DARK went on to tour for over 80 dates across 15 countries in Europe and throughout the UK. In January, an extended hybrid version of DARK ran for a week at London's Soho Theatre (rebranded DARK REVOIR as DARK had been performed at the London's Royal Albert Hall, Elgar Room in December as part of the UK tour. In February, Daniel transferred the 90 minute version of his solo show (renamed DARK) to New York for a week-long, off-Broadway run at the SoHo Playhouse as well for 2 shows in Los Angeles at the M.I.'s Westside Comedy Theater. The New York Times featured Daniel on the front page of its Arts section.

He opened for Dave Chappelle's two shows as well as starred in the "Best of Edinburgh" line-up at San Francisco's Sketchfest and returned to New York for the second off-Broadway run of his award-winning show DARK at the SoHo Playhouse.

In February 2018, Sloss taped his comedy special DARK at the Belasco Theater in Los Angeles. Part of a two-special deal with Netflix, it was announced on 17 May that DARK and its sequel show So? would both be released later in 2018. Netflix released both shows on 11 September 2018, with So? being retitled Jigsaw. Sloss has claimed that Jigsaw caused over 120,000 break-ups, over 300 divorces, and hundreds more cancelled engagements.

August 2018 saw Sloss premiere his 10th solo show, Daniel Sloss: X during his 11th season at the Edinburgh Festival Fringe season. The subsequent tour again covers 25 European countries, ending with a new season in London's West End. The show received critical acclaim for Sloss' jokes about masculinity as well as its ending segment, a frank analysis of the rape of one his close friends by another friend and societal causes of sexual violence.

On 25 October 2023, Sloss opened for The Mighty Nein Reunion: Echoes of the Solstice, Critical Role's live show at OVO Arena Wembley where the cast reprised their characters from their second campaign.

On 23 July 2026, Sloss once again opened for Darktow, part of Critical Role's live show tour Echoes of Exandria, at Edinburgh Castle. The cast once again reprised their characters from the second campaign, and Sloss was a special guest, playing as the show's villain, Wyatt Maranoss.

=== Television ===
He was the first stand-up comedian to perform on Channel 4's The Paul O'Grady Show (2009) and was commissioned by the BBC in April 2010 for a broadcast sitcom pilot, The Adventures of Daniel, which transmitted on 23 August 2010.

He featured on series 2 of BBC1's Michael McIntyre's Comedy Roadshow on 18 September 2010, and two weeks later on the first series of BBC2's The Rob Brydon Show alongside Stephen Fry as well as on Channel 4's 8 out of 10 Cats.

In January 2011 he performed on ITV1's Jason Manford's Comedy Rocks and in March 2011, was part of the BBC's Comic Relief marathon online broadcast with David Walliams called 24 Hour Panel People, as a panellist on Mock the Week.

The following year, Sloss featured on the BBC's Stand Up for Sport Relief performing a set as well as coaching heavy weight boxing champion Tyson Fury for the latter's stand-up comedy debut.

In September 2012, he recorded a TEDx Talk in Ealing and performed on Set List: Stand-up Without A Net for Sky Atlantic, alongside an all-star lineup of US and international comedy alumni. In October 2012, Sloss appeared in the seventh series of Russell Howard's Good News.

In December 2013 he made his USA television debut with an appearance on Conan, he has since appeared a further 8 times. In addition, Daniel signed a talent deal with Conan O'Brien's production company Conaco to develop his own shows. He also appeared on the Pete Holmes Show, @Midnight, The Late Late Show with Craig Ferguson and back in the UK was featured on ITV's Sunday Night at the Palladium.

Along with a number of fellow comedians, including Kai Humphries and Tom Stade, he wrote, co-produced and starred in 6-part internet sitcom M.U.F.F.

Sloss also appeared in Beardyman's One Album Per Hour as part of Beardyman's 2 part YouTube series; other guest producers included Tim Minchin and Jack Black.

In the first half of 2017 he featured on Comedy Central's Drunk History re-telling the story of William Wallace (portrayed by Keith Allen) as well as the Dave Channel's Dara O Briain's Go 8 Bit. Later that autumn Sloss appeared on Comedy Central's Roast Battle with his episode's battle with USA's Desiree Burch getting the highest ratings of the series.

In 2018, Sloss appeared on the second series of Roast Battle, winning the battle against Phil Wang.

Sloss was the only comedian to appear in the Dispatches episode "Russell Brand: In Plain Sight", which revealed allegations of sexual assault and rape against presenter and comedian Russell Brand.

== Personal life ==
In February 2021, Sloss announced he was engaged to Kara Mitchell. They live in Edinburgh. Their first child together, a son, was born in February 2022. They married on 20 May 2023. Their second child, a daughter, was born in July 2024.

Sloss' hobbies include gaming, watching Robot Wars (in which he appeared as a member of the Bot Out of Hell team in 2002), comedy films, and playing football. He is a supporter of English football team Chelsea FC. He has several tattoos such as a portrait of Nikola Tesla, cartoon tigers drawn in the style of Calvin and Hobbes, a picture of Anthony and the Aardvark, and an image of the Joker.

== Television appearances ==
- Robot Wars, 2002
- The Paul O'Grady Show, 2009
- Most Annoying People of 2009, 2009
- Good News Week 2010
- Cracker Night 2010
- The Adventures of Daniel, 2010
- Michael McIntyre's Comedy Roadshow, 2010
- The Rob Brydon Show, 2010
- The Most Annoying People of 2010, 2010
- Jason Manford's Comedy Rocks, 2011
- Comic Relief's 24 Hour Panel People, Mock the Week, 2011
- Comic Relief's Stand Up for Sport Relief, 2011
- 8 out of 10 Cats, 2010–2011 (2 appearances)
- Alexander Armstrong's Big Ask, 2012
- BBC Edinburgh Comedy Marathon, 2012
- Russell Howard's Good News Extra, 2012
- Comedy World Cup, 2012
- Soccer AM, 2012
- Cracker Night, 2013
- The Pete Holmes Show, 2014
- @midnight, 2014
- The Late Late Show With Craig Ferguson, 2014
- Sunday Night at the Palladium, 2014
- The John Bishop Show, 2015
- Drunk History, 2017
- Roast Battle, 2018 (2 appearances)
- Conan, 2013-2019 (10 appearances)
- SophieCo. Visionaries: Being offended by a joke is narcissism – stand-up comedian, 2021
- The Graham Norton Show, 2021
- Russell Brand: In Plain Sight, 2023

== Tours ==
- 2008 Life in 2D
- 2009 Daniel Sloss – Teenage Kicks
- 2010 Daniel Sloss – My Generation
- 2011 Daniel Sloss – The Joker
- 2012 Daniel Sloss – The Show (EICC Edinburgh International Conference Centre + touring)
- 2013 Daniel Sloss – Stand-Up (EICC Edinburgh International Conference Centre + touring)
- 2014 Daniel Sloss – Really...?! (EICC Edinburgh International Conference Centre + touring)
- 2015 Daniel Sloss – DARK (EICC Edinburgh International Conference Centre + touring)
- 2016 Daniel Sloss – SO? (EICC Edinburgh International Conference Centre + touring)
- 2017 Daniel Sloss – NOW (EICC Edinburgh International Conference Centre + touring)
- 2018 Daniel Sloss – X (EICC Edinburgh International Conference Centre + touring)
- 2020/2021 Daniel Sloss – HUBRIS
- 2022/2024 Daniel Sloss – CAN'T
- 2025/2026 Daniel Sloss – BITTER

== Stand-up specials ==
Title	Released	Notes
Daniel Sloss Live	12 November 2012 (2Entertain DVD)	Recorded at Glasgow's Kings Theatre
Daniel Sloss Live Shows: DARK	11 September 2018 (Netflix)	Recorded at Los Angeles's Belasco Theater
Daniel Sloss Live Shows: Jigsaw	11 September 2018 (Netflix)	Recorded at Sydney's Enmore Theatre
Daniel Sloss: X	2 November 2019 (HBO)	Recorded at Sydney's Enmore Theatre
Daniel Sloss: SOCIO	9 December 2022 (Danielsloss.com)	Recorded at the Paramount Theatre, Austin Texas 29 June 2019
Daniel Sloss: Hubris	21 December 2024 (Danielsloss.com)	Recorded at the Scottish Event Campus, Glasgow Scotland 28 August 2021
Daniel Sloss: CAN'T	6 December 2025 (Danielsloss.com)	Recorded at the TIM Theater Centre, Istanbul Turkey 9 March 2024
