= Matt Rees (comedian) =

Matt Rees is a Welsh comedian from Maesteg, Wales.

Rees is a Chortle Awards nominee.

He has supported Elis James. He performed as part of the Pleasance Reserve at Edinburgh Festival Fringe in 2012.

He has been nominated for and won numerous awards including Welsh Unsigned Stand-up Award, Loaded Laftas New Act of the Year, Leicester Mercury Comedian of the Year.

He cites Sean Lock, Jack Dee and Dara Ó Briain amongst his influences.
