= Geoff Norcott =

British comedian (born 1976)

- Born: Geoffrey Frank Norcott; 16 December 1976 (age 49); London, England
- Education: Goldsmiths, University of London
- Occupations: Comedian, writer and political commentator
- Spouse: Emma Norcott
- Children: 1

Geoffrey Frank Norcott (born 16 December 1976) is an English comedian, writer and political commentator. He first performed in 2001 and has appeared on Mock the Week, Live at the Apollo and Question Time, and written for The Daily Telegraph, The Independent and Spiked.

== Early life ==
Norcott was raised in South London. His father was a draughtsman for British Telecom and an active trade unionist. His parents divorced when he was nine, and his mother moved with him and his elder sister to a council estate in Mitcham.

He attended Southfields Secondary School, before moving to Rutlish School in Merton Park, the same school attended by Conservative Prime Minister John Major.

Norcott holds an English degree from Goldsmiths, University of London, and worked as an English teacher.

== Early career ==
Norcott performed at his first comedy gig in September 2001, initially performing as a way of supplementing his teaching income.

In 2003 Norcott performed at Balham's Banana Cabaret, alongside Paul Tonkinson and Michael McIntyre.

In 2005, Norcott was approached to appear on radio and television, as a panellist and presenter on shows for Talksport, Nuts TV and the BBC.

He received an Operational Service Medal for five frontline tours entertaining the troops in Afghanistan.

== Recent career ==
In 2013, Norcott was nominated for 'Best New Show' at the Leicester Comedy Festival for his show Geoff Norcott Occasionally Sells Out, about – among other things – the fact he was now a Conservative voter, which he then took to the Edinburgh Fringe.

He returned to the Fringe in 2015 with The Look of Moron, a further development of his voice as a political comic, and again in 2016 with Conswervative, which received wide political acclaim and a successful sold-out run.

In early 2017, Norcott made his first of several appearances on the BBC's Question Time and made his debut as a regular on BBC Two's The Mash Report, a programme he continued to appear on, including after 2021 when it relocated to Dave post-cancellation.

Norcott took another show, Right Leaning, But Well Meaning, to the Fringe the same year to further acclaim, and the show was later recorded as a radio special for BBC Radio 4, airing in 2018.

In 2018, he made his first appearance on Live at the Apollo, and took a new show, Traditionalism on a UK tour.

Later the same year, Norcott appeared on Mock the Week for the first time, being the first openly pro-Brexit comedian on the show.

He has also appeared on several UK political debate shows, including Politics Live and Daily Politics.

Norcott has written for a number of UK television shows, including A League of Their Own, 8 Out of 10 Cats Does Countdown and Frankie Boyle's New World Order.

A 2019 appearance on Question Time prompted another online backlash for Norcott, after a clip of him criticising European Union President Donald Tusk went viral. The same year, he presented the BBC Two documentary How The Middle Classes Ruined Britain, in which he investigated issues like how some people 'gamed' the system to secure places in good schools, and accusations of social cleansing in housing.

2019 also saw Norcott become the first white male to join the BBC's diversity panel, by virtue of his working class background. He has spoken of the irony of having, as a "straight, white, middle-aged man", taken advantage of diversity quotas to further his career.

In November 2020, it was announced that Norcott would be publishing a memoir entitled Where Did I Go Right?, in which he "unpicks his working-class upbringing and his political journey". The book (and audio-book, voiced by Norcott) was released in May 2021 to mixed reception. In a three-star review in the Daily Telegraph, critic Dominic Cavendish described it as a "frank, light-hearted account of how Norcott came from working-class origins in south London to forge a career in comedy" as well as "a sober mapping of the changing political landscape".

== Podcast ==
In February 2019, Norcott launched a podcast titled What Most People Think, in which he aims to "get to the heart of what ordinary people think about social and political issues". Now recorded weekly, the podcast is funded by Patreon donations from listeners. Norcott claims to have refused approaches from would-be advertisers so as to avoid the risk of his content being influenced or censored. The podcast has been described by The Times as "amiably polemical".

Many of the episodes have featured interviews with guests, including fellow comedians David Baddiel, Katherine Ryan, Romesh Ranganathan, Andrew Doyle, Henning Wehn, Marcus Brigstocke, Simon Evans, Konstantin Kisin, Seann Walsh, Dominic Frisby and Leo Kearse. Outside of comedy, other guests have included journalists Owen Jones and Garry Bushell, actor turned political activist Laurence Fox, and trade unionist Paul Embery.

Regular minor features which supplement the interviews include a "cuss count" in which Norcott recounts the number of swear words used in the previous episode; a letters section in which observations from listeners are discussed; and a final segment in which Norcott shares recent reviews left for the podcast on iTunes. In reading out listener contributions, Norcott often adopts exaggerated regional accents reflecting whichever part of the country the correspondent come from.

== Personal life ==
Norcott lives in Cambridgeshire with his wife Emma, whom he married in 2004. In 2014 the couple's daughter Connie was still-born at 34 weeks. Norcott has spoken openly of their loss, including in May 2021 on an episode of Cariad Lloyd's Griefcast podcast. The couple now have a son named Sebastian.

Norcott describes himself as a "right-wing libertarian". In 2016, he said he was the only outspoken Conservative Party supporter on the British comedy circuit and in 2020 suggested that he is one of only "about six" right-wing comedians. In 2017, he was listed by Iain Dale as one of the '100 Most Influential People on the Right'.

Norcott is an AFC Wimbledon fan. He attended the 1988 FA Cup Final and he used to sell programmes during the Dons' time at Kingsmeadow, in addition to hosting an event at the new Plough Lane.

== Live tours ==
- Conswervative (2016)
- Right Leaning but Well Meaning (2017)
- Traditionalism (2018)
- Taking Liberties (2020)
- I Blame the Parents (2021)
- Basic Bloke (2024)
- Basic Bloke 2: There's No Bloke Without Fire (2025)

== Television credits ==
- Would I Lie to You? BBC One, 2020
- Question Time, BBC One, 2017 – 2019
- Jeremy Vine, Channel 5, 2019
- The Wright Stuff, Channel 5, 2018
- Live Apollo, BBC, 2018
- Mock the Week, BBC Two, 2018
- Dave’s Advent Calendar, Dave, 2018
- Politics Live, BBC Two, 2018
- The Blame Game, BBC One Northern Ireland, 2017
- Edinburgh Nights, BBC Two, 2017
- Comedy Bigmouths, My5, 2017
- The Mash Report, BBC Two, 2017–2021
- Daily Politics, BBC Two, 2017
- All Out Politics, Sky News, 2017 – present
- Countdown, Channel 4, 2022

== Radio credits ==
- Right Leaning but Well Meaning, BBC Radio 4
- Good Week, Bad Week, BBC Radio 5Live
- The Now Show, BBC Radio 4
- Loose Ends, BBC Radio 4
- Breaking the News, Radio Scotland
- The News Quiz, BBC Radio 4

== Writing credits ==
- Have I Got News for You, BBC One
- King Gary, BBC Two
- Xmas Live at the Apollo, BBC Two
- 8 Out of 10 Cats Does Countdown, Channel 4
- Judge Romesh, Dave
- A League of Their Own, Sky 1
- The Sarah Millican Television Programme, BBC Two
- Roast Battle, Comedy Central
- Katherine Ryan Stand-up Show, JFL
- Frankie Boyle's New World Order, BBC Two
- The Misadventures of Romesh Ranganathan, BBC Two
- The Fake News Show, Channel 4
- Safeword, ITV 2
- 8 Out of 10 Cats, Channel 4
- Round Earth, BBC Worldwide
- The Outlaws, BBC
- Weakest Link, BBC (2021 – present)
