= Michael Odewale =

British stand-up comedian

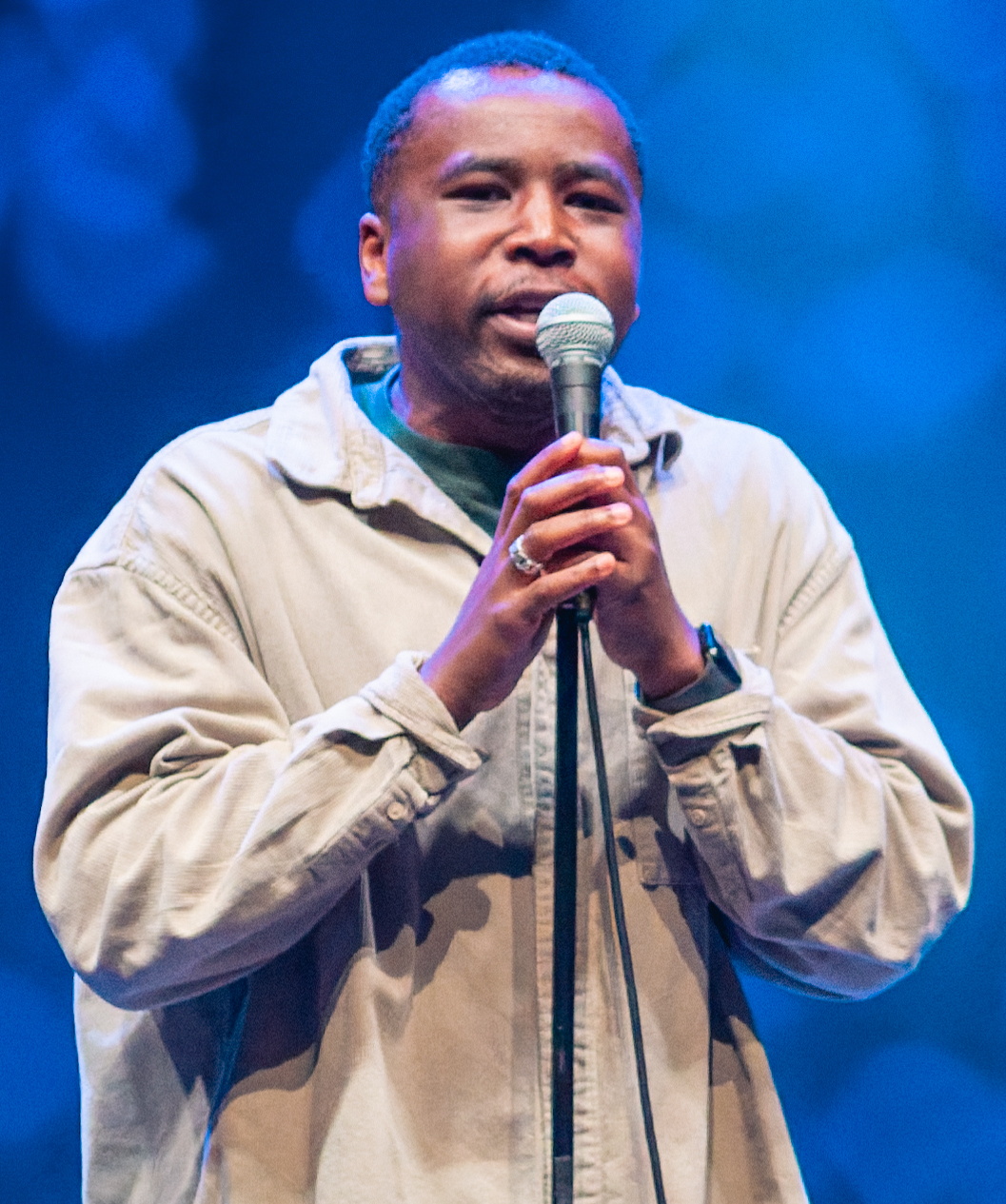
- Michael Odewale in 2025
- Born: 22 May 1995 (age 30); London, England
- Occupation: stand-up comedian
- Years active: 2014–present
- Website: www.utcartistmanagement.co.uk/artist/michael-odewale/

Michael Odewale (born 22 May 1995) is an English stand-up comedian.

== Early life ==
Odewale was born into a British Nigerian family and grew up in Dagenham.

== Career ==
Odewale began performing in 2014 while at university.

In 2016 he was nominated for the BBC New Comedy Award and was a finalist for the Chortle Student Comedy Award. He was named on the BBC New Talent Hotlist 2017.

Odewale's 2019 show, #BlackBearsMatter, was nominated for Best Newcomer at the Edinburgh Festival and won Best New Show at the Leicester Comedy Festival.

In 2020 and 2021 Odewale appeared on Mock the Week. He also co-wrote Death to 2020.
