= Chris Washington (comedian) =

English stand-up comedian

- Born: 18 March 1989 (age 36)
- Occupation: comedian
- Years active: 2017–present
- Height: 6 ft 3 in (191 cm)
- Website: Chris Washington on Facebook

Chris Washington (born 18 March 1989) is an English stand-up comedian.

== Early life ==
Washington is a native of Golborne. He attended St Aelred's Roman Catholic High School in Newton-le-Willows, Merseyside. Washington worked as a postman for eleven years before becoming a comedian, confessing that he had used all his annual leave in one go to travel to the Edinburgh Fringe in August.

== Career ==
Washington was nominated for best newcomer in the 2017 lastminute.com Edinburgh Comedy Awards for his show Dream Big (Within Reason).

He has made TV appearances on Live from the BBC, Mock the Week and, in October 2021, Richard Osman's House of Games. In late 2021, Washington also appeared, as himself, in an advertisement for the Nationwide Building Society.
