= Laura Lexx =

British comedian and writer

- Born: 28 September 1986 (age 39); Taunton, Somerset, England
- Education: University of Kent
- Notable work: Klopp Actually: (Imaginary) Life with Football's Most Sensible Heartthrob
- Spouse: Tom Livingstone (m. 2015)

Comedy career
- Years active: 2009–present
- Medium: Stand-up, television, radio, podcast, YouTube
- Genres: Storytelling, political satire, observational comedy
- Website: https://www.lauralexx.co.uk/

Laura Lexx (born 28 September 1986) is an English comedian and writer originally from Somerset.

== Early life and education ==
Laura Lexx was brought up in Taunton, where her mother was a primary school teacher before her retirement in 2023. She attended Bishop Fox’s School before studying drama at the University of Kent from 2005 to 2009, graduating with a master's degree. Lexx performed comedy during a spell working as a search engine optimiser before turning to comedy full-time in 2015.

== Career ==
Laura performed Tyrannosaurus Lexx at the Edinburgh Festival Fringe in 2016 and was a finalist at the 2016 Amused Moose Comedy Awards. Lexx's profile rose in 2016 when her on-stage putdowns of a sexist heckler went viral online. Lexx was nominated for Best Compere at the 2016 and 2017 Chortle Awards. Her 2018 Edinburgh show, Trying, discussed her attempts at starting a family and the effects on her mental health. She hoped her honesty would help lift the stigma around these issues.

Laura won Best Performer in the Comedian's Choice Awards and was in the top 10 of the Funniest Joke of the Fringe 2018. The show transferred from the Edinburgh Festival for a successful run at London's Soho Theatre. Lexx's 2019 Edinburgh show was called Knee Jerk and dealt with political topics associated with the fallout from the 2016 United Kingdom European Union membership referendum. Lexx won the Comedians' Choice award at the 2019 Chortle Awards.

Her television appearances have included Roast Battle, Hypothetical, Live at the Apollo and Mock the Week. Lexx landed a book deal after a series of tweets during the lockdown of the COVID-19 pandemic imagining life with Liverpool F.C. manager Jürgen Klopp went viral online, amassing over 5.6 million views. The idea was expanded into the book Klopp Actually: (Imaginary) Life with Football's Most Sensible Heartthrob, released in autumn 2020. The company, Two Roads, also bought the rights to a second story, Pivot, a novel about an amateur women's netball team, which they released in 2022. This led to guest appearances on The Football Ramble and The Anfield Wrap podcasts. Other podcast appearances have included RHLSTP with Richard Herring and Sarah Millican’s Standard Issue podcast.

Lexx is very active on social media, with thousands of followers on Twitter and YouTube. During lockdown in 2020 she created frequent YouTube series, including "As We Know It Day", "The Lockdown Book Club" and "The Twelve Days of Kloppmas".

== Personal life ==
Lexx married fellow comedian Tom Livingstone in Somerset in 2015. She has supported the Green Party.
