= Olga Koch =

Russian-born British stand-up comedian (born 1992)

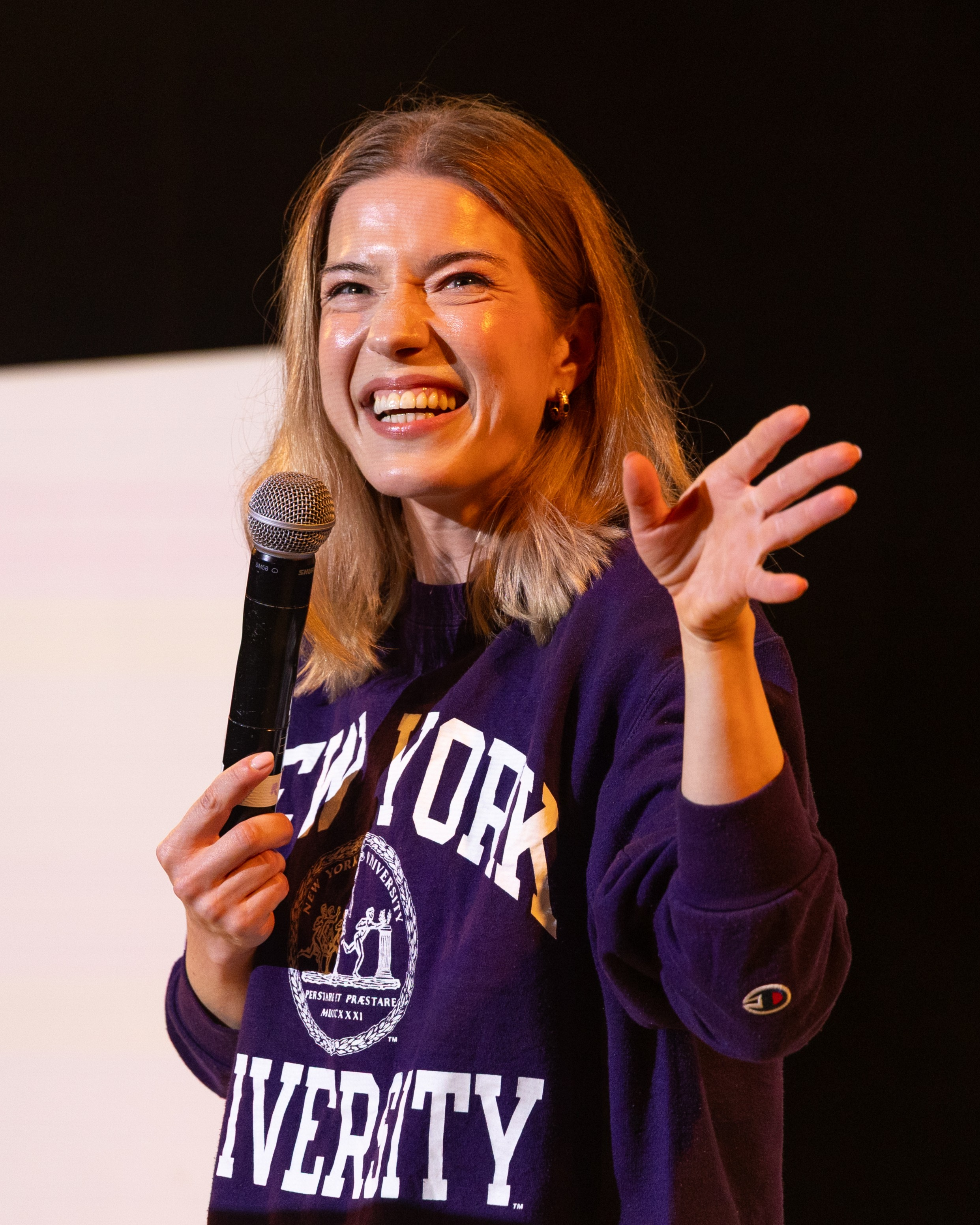
- Olga Koch at the Edinburgh Fringe Festival in 2026.
- Born: Olga Alfredovna Kokh; 1 September 1992 (age 34); Saint Petersburg, Russia
- Education: New York University (BSc); Keble College, Oxford (MSc); University College London (attended)
- Occupation: Stand-up comedian
- Years active: 2016–present
- Notable work: BBC Radio 4's Olga Koch: Fight, Just Friends, If/Then, Homecoming
- Awards: WGGB Writers' Guild Awards for Best Radio Comedy Show
- Website: www.rocknrolga.com

Olga Alfredovna Koch (Russian: Ольга Альфредовна Кох; born 1 September 1992) is a Russian-British stand-up comedian, writer, and actress.

== Early life and education ==
Koch was born in Saint Petersburg in 1992, one year after the collapse of the Soviet Union. Her father, Alfred Koch, was head of the State Committee for State Property Management of the Russian Federation from 1996 to 1997 under President Boris Yeltsin. She has a sister who is 12 years older than her and a brother who is 10 years younger.

When Koch was 13, her family moved to the UK, settling in Surrey. She was educated at The American School in England, a private school for children of expats and diplomats. According to Koch, the school was so American that it seemed everyone there was behaving as if they were performing in a US high-school movie. As a result, she speaks English with an American accent despite having lived in the UK for most of her life.

After finishing school, Koch moved to the US to study computer science at New York University. While in New York, she also trained at the Upright Citizens Brigade Theatre. She returned to the UK in 2014 and went on to obtain a Master's degree in the Social Science of the Internet from Keble College, Oxford, with parasocial relationships as her specialist area of study. She continued her comedy training in London at Soho Theatre and The Free Association.

In 2026, Koch was studying for a PhD in Human-Computer Interaction at University College London.

== Career ==
Koch performed at the Edinburgh Fringe Festival for the first time in 2016, in the show Me, Me, Me with fellow comedians Ryan Bridge and Charlie Ringe. She returned to Edinburgh the following year in two shows: 'Data Night', written by Koch, and performed by her and comedian Catherine Brinkworth, and Good Vibes, with comedian Heather Shaw. In 2018, she was nominated for Best Newcomer at the Edinburgh Comedy Awards for her debut hour, Fight. She was named Quantum Leopard Champion of Champions for 2018, jointly with Zoë Tomalin.

Koch regularly appears in line-ups for charity shows, most notably hosting Canned Laughter's Karaoke Roulette.

She has appeared on The Now Show, Mock the Week, Pls Like, Richard Osman's House of Games, Pointless Celebrities, 7 Days, and QI, and written for Newsjack and BBC Three's A Quickie in the Office.

In 2020 Koch hosted a web series for Dave, Bad Advice with Olga Koch.

In November 2020, a recording of her show If/Then was and released as a vinyl record by Monkey Barrel Records.

Koch and Hussein Kesvani presented Human Error, a weekly comedy-technology podcast for BBC Sounds in 2021. In July 2021, Olga Koch: OK Computer (a reference to the Radiohead album title OK Computer) debuted on BBC Radio 4. Written and presented by Koch, the programme was renewed for a second and third season.

In 2022, her BBC Radio 4 show Olga Koch: Fight won the Best Radio Comedy category at the Writers’ Guild of Great Britain's WGGB Writers' Guild Awards.

In 2022, she toured her show Just Friends in the UK and Ireland and also took it to the Edinburgh Fringe. A recording of the show at Soho Theatre Dean Street was released on the 800 Pound Gorilla Media free YouTube channel in December 2023.

In May 2022, her show Homecoming was released on Amazon Prime as part of Soho Theatre Live.

In September 2022, Koch and Geoff Norcott began presenting a podcast for Late Night Mash. It ended after 9 episodes.

In November 2022, Koch appeared in the third series of Mel Giedroyc: Unforgivable.

Olga Koch: Prawn Cocktail ("how I went to Japan with a stranger I met at a wedding") was a work-in-progress for the Edinburgh Fringe 2023. In January 2024, Koch toured it as a produced show in Great Britain, Australia, and New Zealand, while also touring Olga Koch Comes From Money as a work-in-progress. Later that year, she took Olga Koch Comes From Money to the Edinburgh Fringe.

In September 2023, it was announced she would be part of series 18 of Live at the Apollo, with Lara Ricote, Celya AB, Rachel Fairburn, Emmanuel Sonubi, Glenn Moore, Ria Lina and Lou Sanders, among others. Koch performed alongside comedian Troy Hawke in episode 5, presented by Emmanuel Sonubi and first broadcast on BBC2 in December 2023.

On 23 February 2024, Koch was a guest on the British podcast No Such Thing as a Fish.

Since 2024, Koch co-hosts the comedy podcast Glue Factory alongside fellow comedians Milo Edwards, Pierre Novellie and Riley Quinn.

In January 2026, Koch launched a podcast focused on the TV show Heated Rivalry, called Tonsil Hockey, which she co-hosts with fellow comedian Catherine Bohart. Tonsil Hockey won the 2026 Golden Lobes Best New Show award.

In February 2026, Koch's new show, Fat Tom Cruise, premiered at Soho Theatre London.

== Personal life ==
Out of fear of persecution by the Russian authorities, Koch's parents fled to Germany in June 2014. As of 2015, they live on Lake Chiemsee in Rosenheim, Bavaria. Koch often refers to her family background in her comedy.

Koch lives in Angel, London, and is bisexual. She became a British citizen in 2021, which is the main theme of her show Homecoming.
