= Sukh Ojla =

British stand-up comedian

- Born: 31 May 1984 (age 42); London, United Kingdom
- Other name: Sukhjeet Ojla
- Education: Court Theatre Training Company
- Occupations: stand-up comedian, actress, novelist, playwright
- Years active: 2011–present
- Website: sukhojla.com

Sukhjeet Kaur "Sukh" Ojla (/ˈsʊk ˈɒdjlɑː/; born 31 May 1984) is an English stand-up comedian, novelist, playwright and comedy writer.

== Early life ==
Ojla is from a working-class British Punjabi Sikh family. After school, she attended drama school at the Court Theatre Training Company.

== Career ==
Ojla has acted in Black Mirror ("White Christmas"), Hospital People, EastEnders, GameFace, The End of the F***ing World and the film Victoria and Abdul.

Her stage work has included Gurpreet Kaur Bhatti's Elephant (Birmingham Repertory Theatre) and Tamsin Oglesby's Future Conditional (The Old Vic).

Ojla began to perform stand-up comedy in 2016. She has appeared on The Big Asian Stand-Up and Mock the Week.

Ojla wrote and starred in the play Pyar Actually in 2017.

Ojla published her first novel, Sunny, in 2021.
