= Glenn Moore (comedian) =

British stand-up comedian and presenter (born 1989)

- Born: Glenn Roger Moore; 20 January 1989 (age 37); Croydon, England
- Education: University of Sheffield

Comedy career
- Medium: Stand-up, television, radio
- Website: www.glennmoorecomedy.com

Glenn Moore (born 20 January 1989) is a British stand-up comedian and presenter.

== Career ==
Moore was a finalist in the 2011 Chortle Student Comedian of the Year Award whilst studying English Literature at the University of Sheffield. After graduating, he worked as a newsreader on a number of radio stations, whilst performing stand-up.

In September 2017, Moore appeared as a panellist on the BBC Two panel show Mock the Week. In October 2017, he joined the Absolute Radio breakfast show as a sports newsreader and "sidekick" until December 2025. He appeared on Mock the Week again in June 2018 and May 2019, and was later nominated for the most prestigious comedy prize in the UK, the Edinburgh Comedy Award, for his show Glenn Glenn Glenn, How Do You Like It, How Do You Like It. He since made regular appearances on the show until 2022.

In January 2019, Moore appeared in ITVs The Stand Up Sketch Show and ITV’s Out There. As of 19 November 2020, Moore has started streaming games on Twitch.

In June 2025 Moore replaced Phil Wang as co-host of the podcast Budpod with Pierre Novellie. Since July 2025, he has also hosted Button Boys with Pierre Novellie and Sarah Keyworth.

== Personal life ==
Moore married comedy writer Katie Storey in November 2023.
