= Milton Jones =

English comedian

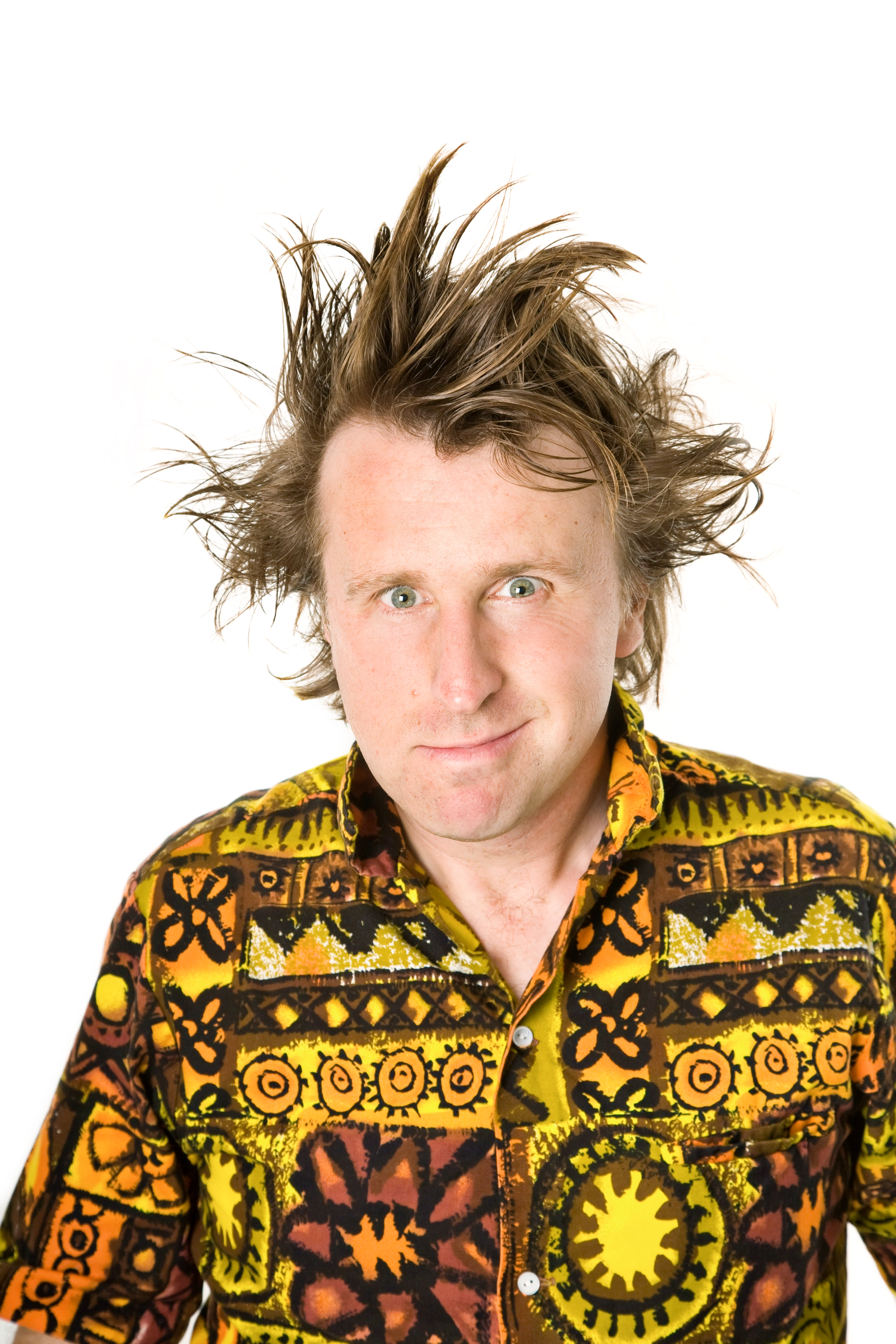
- Promotional photo for the Lion Whisperer tour
- Born: Milton Hywel Jones; 16 May 1964 (age 62); Kew, London, England
- Notable work: Mock The Week; Live at the Apollo

Comedy career
- Years active: 1996–present
- Medium: Stand-up, television
- Genres: One-liners, deadpan, surreal humour
- Subjects: Everyday life, celebrities, pop culture, human interaction, current events

Milton Hywel Jones (born 16 May 1964) is an English comedian. His style of humour is based on one-liners involving puns delivered in a deadpan and slightly neurotic style.

== Career ==
Jones has had various shows on BBC Radio 4 and is a recurring guest panellist on Mock the Week. Jones tours the UK periodically and is a regular performer at The Comedy Store in London and Manchester. Jones wrote the surrealist, partially biographical novel Where Do Comedians Go When They Die?: Journeys of a Stand-Up (2009).

== Personal life ==
Jones was born and raised in Kew, London. His father is from South Wales. He attended Middlesex Polytechnic, gaining a diploma in dramatic art in 1985. He married Caroline Church in 1986 and they have three children. They live in the St Margarets area of London. He supports Arsenal. Jones is a practising Christian and often performs in churches and at Christian festivals. He is a patron of the charity Chance for Childhood. On 28 April 2025, Milton revealed he had prostate cancer, cancelling some of his tour dates so he can have surgery. In August 2025, he announced he was cancer-free after undergoing treatment.

== Filmography ==
=== Radio programmes ===
- The Very World of Milton Jones (1998–2001)
- The House of Milton Jones (2003)
- Another Case of Milton Jones (2005–2011)
- Thanks a Lot, Milton Jones! (2014–2024)

=== Books ===
- Ten Second Sermons [DLT Books: 2011] ISBN 978-0-232-52882-4 (Christian book with biblical and church-based one liners)
- Even More Concise 10 Second Sermons [DLT Books: 2013] ISBN 9780232530049 (the sequel to Ten Second Sermons)
- Where Do Comedians Go When They Die?

=== Television ===
- Milton Jones's House of Rooms (2012 pilot of a sitcom for Channel 4)
- 28 Acts in 28 Minutes (BBC, 60 seconds of stand-up)
- The Strangerers (Sky One)
- The Comedy Store
- The World Stands Up
- Live at Jongleurs
- Music Hall Meltdown (BBC, one-off variety programme)
- Planet Mirth
- Mock the Week
- Michael McIntyre's Comedy Roadshow
- Lee Mack's All Star Cast
- Zulu Comedy Galla in Denmark
- Gonzola's Comedy Fest
- Live at the Apollo (two appearances)

Jones was also a writer for TV shows: he worked on The One Ronnie, Not Going Out and Laughing Cow.

=== Stand-up DVDs ===
- Live Universe Tour – Part 1 – Earth (2009)
- Lion Whisperer – (21 November 2011)
- On The Road – (25 November 2013)

== Awards ==
He won the Perrier comedy award for best newcomer in 1996, and in 2012, Another Case of Milton Jones was awarded silver in the 'Best Comedy' category at the 30th Sony Radio Academy awards.
