= Ben Norris (comedian) =

British stand up comedian

Ben Norris is a British stand-up comedian who has been performing on the comedy circuit since 1993. He was the warm-up man for the seventh series of Mock the Week on which he also appeared three times as a guest, on one occasion standing in for Frankie Boyle, who had been taken ill shortly before filming started. He has also appeared on several other programmes, including Never Mind the Buzzcocks. He performs regularly at The Comedy Store.

Norris has twice been Ed Byrne's support act on national tours. His cousin is the actor Martin Freeman.

He has written and performed three solo shows at The Edinburgh Festival: 'Sitting Room Only' (1997), 'Mr Ambiguousness' (2013), and 'Benny on the Loose' (2014).

A CD of his stand-up, Live At The Comedy Store, was released in 2007. His debut musical comedy album, Moral Vacuum, was released in March 2020.
