= Sarah Keyworth =

English comedian (born 1993)

- Born: 6 April 1993 (age 33)
- Education: De Montfort University
- Occupation: Comedian
- Years active: 2012–present
- Website: sarahkeyworth.co.uk

Sarah Keyworth (born 6 April 1993) is an English stand-up comedian. They (Note: Keyworth is non-binary and uses they/them, she/her and he/him pronouns. This article uses they/them for consistency) began a career in comedy in 2012, eventually going full-time in 2018 after being nominated for Best Newcomer at the Edinburgh Comedy Awards. Keyworth has appeared on television comedy shows such as Roast Battle, The Now Show, The Dog Ate My Homework, Mock the Week, 8 Out of 10 Cats, and 8 Out of 10 Cats Does Countdown.

== Early life ==
Keyworth was born on 6 April 1993 and used to create shows with their brother when they were children.

From 2011 to 2014, Keyworth studied drama at De Montfort University in Leicester and was active in the university's comedy club, citing Jennifer Saunders as their favourite comedian. Keyworth later got a marketing internship at the London Academy of Music and Dramatic Art (LAMDA) and worked as a nanny.

== Career ==
Keyworth emerged as a runner-up at the 2015 Funny Women and their first show, Dark Horse, was nominated for best newcomer at the 2018 Edinburgh Comedy Awards.

They were named Newcomer of the Year at the 2019 Chortle Awards. Their second show, Pacific, debuted in 2019. An exploration of gender and roles in relationships, Veronica Lee in The Arts Desk described it as a "nicely paced, sharply written and well delivered hour with some great gags".

On TV and radio, Keyworth has appeared on Roast Battle, The Stand Up Sketch Show, The Now Show, The Dog Ate My Homework, Mock the Week, 8 Out of 10 Cats and Richard Osman's House of Games. In 2019, they performed at the Glastonbury Festival and later that year won the reality TV series Celebrity Coach Trip with Francis Boulle of Made in Chelsea. They appeared on Guy Montgomery's Guy Mont-Spelling Bee (AU) in 2026.

Keyworth developed a third show titled Lil' Keys, Big Jokes; they were due to perform the show at the Edinburgh Festival Fringe that year but the Covid-19 pandemic led to the cancellation of the show and almost the entire fringe. In the lockdown that followed the spread of the COVID-19 virus in the UK, Keyworth and Catherine Bohart hosted a weekly online comedy show, "Gigless". Also in 2020, Keyworth created a four-part comedy series for BBC Radio 4, titled Are You a Boy or a Girl?, which explored gender fluidity. It was recorded with a virtual audience over Zoom, and broadcast in November.

In 2021, they appeared on BBC's Live at the Apollo and in August 2022 Keyworth's third show, Lost Boy, debuted at the Edinburgh Fringe.

Since February 2026, they have appeared regularly as a panelist on Mock the Week.

== Personal life ==
Keyworth lives in London. They dated Irish comedian Catherine Bohart from 2015 to 2020, during which time they lived together in Kilburn. They are non-binary and use they/them, she/her and he/him pronouns. Keyworth was diagnosed with attention deficit hyperactivity disorder (ADHD) in adulthood.
