= Angela Barnes =

English comedian (born 1976)

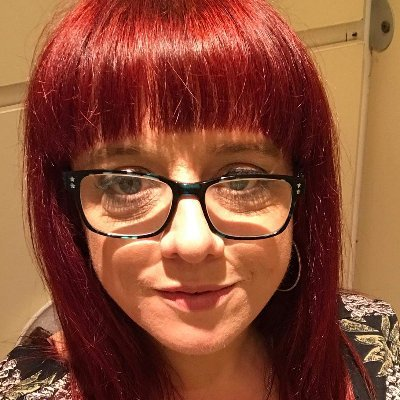
- Barnes in 2024
- Born: 9 November 1976 (age 49); Sidcup, London, England
- Education: Invicta Grammar School; University of Sussex

Comedy career
- Years active: 2009–present
- Medium: Stand-up, television
- Genre: Observational comedy
- Website: angelabarnescomedy.co.uk

Angela Barnes (born 9 November 1976) is an English stand-up comedian known for her appearances on Mock the Week.

== Early life and education ==
Barnes was born in Sidcup, London and raised in Maidstone, Kent. She attended Invicta Grammar School and later studied at the University of Sussex in Brighton from 1996. During childhood she experienced repeated ear infections which resulted in hearing loss, and she wears hearing aids.

== Comedy career ==
After graduating from university, Barnes trained as a nurse and later worked in social care.

Before becoming a professional comedian, Barnes organised comedy nights in Brighton. Following the death of her father in 2008, whom she described as a major influence on her interest in comedy, she decided to pursue stand-up professionally. She attended a 12-week comedy workshop in Brighton, and began performing on stage several months later.

Since winning the BBC Radio 2's New Comedy Award 2011, Barnes has continued to be a regular on the stand-up circuit, playing ever bigger venues. She has also appeared on Weekend Wogan's Children in Need Special and Russell Kane's Whistlestop Tour for BBC Radio 2, written for BBC Radio 4's The News Quiz, played on Eddie Izzard's Laughs in the Park on BBC Two, appeared on Russell Howard's Good News on BBC Three, developed her own series with BBC Radio Comedy, and performed at the Latitude Festival, the Edinburgh Festival Fringe and Radio 2 Live in Hyde Park.

In June 2013, Barnes became noted for an article in The Guardian that followed a blog post she had written, where she spoke about how she felt society treated people deemed ugly and her feelings as someone who self-identified as such. She returned to the subject in 2015 as the subject of her Edinburgh Fringe Show "Come As You Are".

In November 2013, Barnes joined the cast of the topical show Stand Up for the Week and, in February 2014, appeared on Radio 4's The Now Show. In November 2014 she appeared on Radio 4's The News Quiz and has become a regular panellist.

She has appeared on Mock the Week and Richard Osman's House of Games, where she was the first ever contestant to win all five days. She appeared on episode of Dave's As Yet Untitled alongside Alan Davies, Janet Street-Porter and Michael Ball and in mid-2016 toured New Zealand.

From 2017 to 2018, she was the host of the show Newsjack broadcast on BBC Radio 4 Extra.

In 2017, as part of her show in the Edinburgh fringe, Fortitude, she performed a gig in a nuclear bunker at Anstruther. In January 2018, she appeared on Live at the Apollo and started to tour Fortitude which is about turning 40, being child free, and nuclear bunkers.

In September 2018, she was able to pay tribute to her comedy hero, the late Linda Smith, at a gala to raise money to fight ovarian cancer, from which Smith died.

In December 2018, Barnes was named as one of the hardest working comedians of 2018, having driven 30,000 miles, visited 91 venues and performed over 100 shows.

After hosting an episode of The News Quiz in September 2019, she hosted a series in spring 2020, with Andy Zaltzman and Nish Kumar hosting the other two series in 2020.

In January 2020 Barnes began co-hosting the ongoing "less-than-serious history podcast" We Are History with writer John O'Farrell.

== Series ==
=== You Can't Take It With You ===
Barnes's stand-up series on BBC Radio 4 was based on her critically acclaimed début show at the Edinburgh Festival Fringe 2014, You Can't Take It With You. The show covers important topics such as life, love, family, work and death. The four-episode series is in part a tribute to her characterful late father, who was a sex shop manager, naturist, swinger and an enthusiast for caravans and pranks, and a major influence on Barnes. He taught her a carpe diem approach to life, and the show takes its name from his motto. This ran for two series, in 2016 and 2019.

=== Angela Barnes's Cold War Secrets ===
Made with Adnan Ahmed, Barnes spoke to people about the Cold War, and to John Robins about how to survive a nuclear apocalypse.

== Campaigns ==
Following the violent murder of Australian comedian Eurydice Dixon in Melbourne, Barnes led the setting up of The Home Safe Collective, a free cab service for comedians at the Edinburgh Fringe Festival who are members of vulnerable groups to ensure they get home safely from gigs. The scheme won the 2018 panel prize award at the Edinburgh comedy awards.

== Personal life ==
Barnes was diagnosed with attention deficit hyperactivity disorder in May 2021. She married her husband Matt in September 2021.

== Awards and nominations ==
- BBC New Comedy Awards 2011: Winner

Media offices
Preceded by Nish Kumar	Host of The News Quiz; 2020	Succeeded by Andy Zaltzman
