= The Heart of Gaming =

Amusement arcade in London, England

Coordinates: 51.3751424°N 0.099322°W

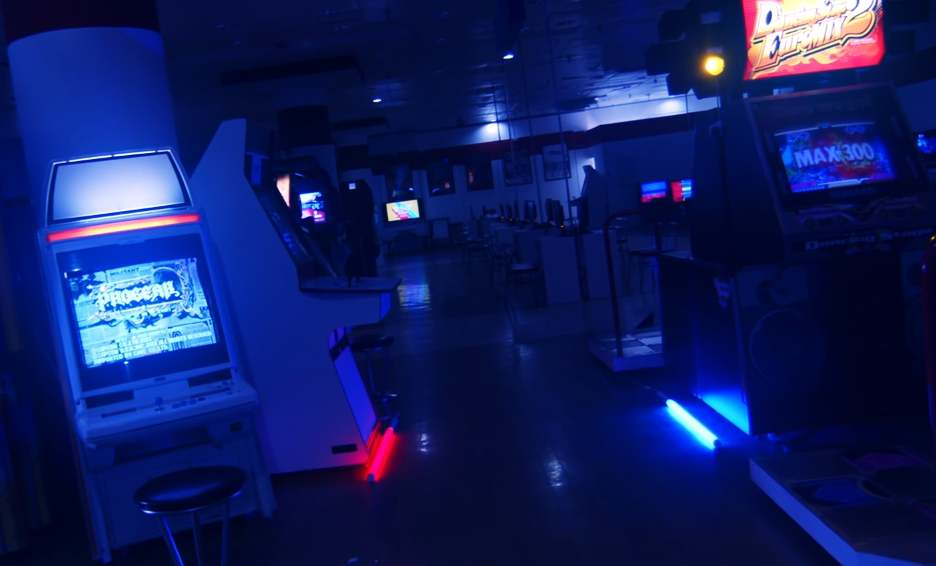
Arcade machines at The Heart of Gaming

The Heart of Gaming is an amusement arcade in London. The arcade's most recent venue opened in 2019 on North End, Croydon.

The Heart of Gaming features a different pricing system to most traditional video game arcades: customers pay a flat entry fee enabling them to play on all the machines in the venue until it closes (unlike the classic coin-operated system where entry is free but customers must insert coins into each machine in order to play it.)

== History ==
The Heart of Gaming's original venue opened in April 2013 in North Acton, London, founded by arcade game enthusiasts Mark Starkey and Simeon Lansiquot who salvaged and restored a number of arcade machines from other London arcades.

In November 2014 it began to be used as a set for Ginx TV's Videogame Nation on Challenge.

In July 2015 the arcade in North Acton was robbed, the items in the arcade were worth over £5,000 of equipment stolen. Starkey started a crowdfunding campaign on GoFundMe, which successfully recouped the losses.

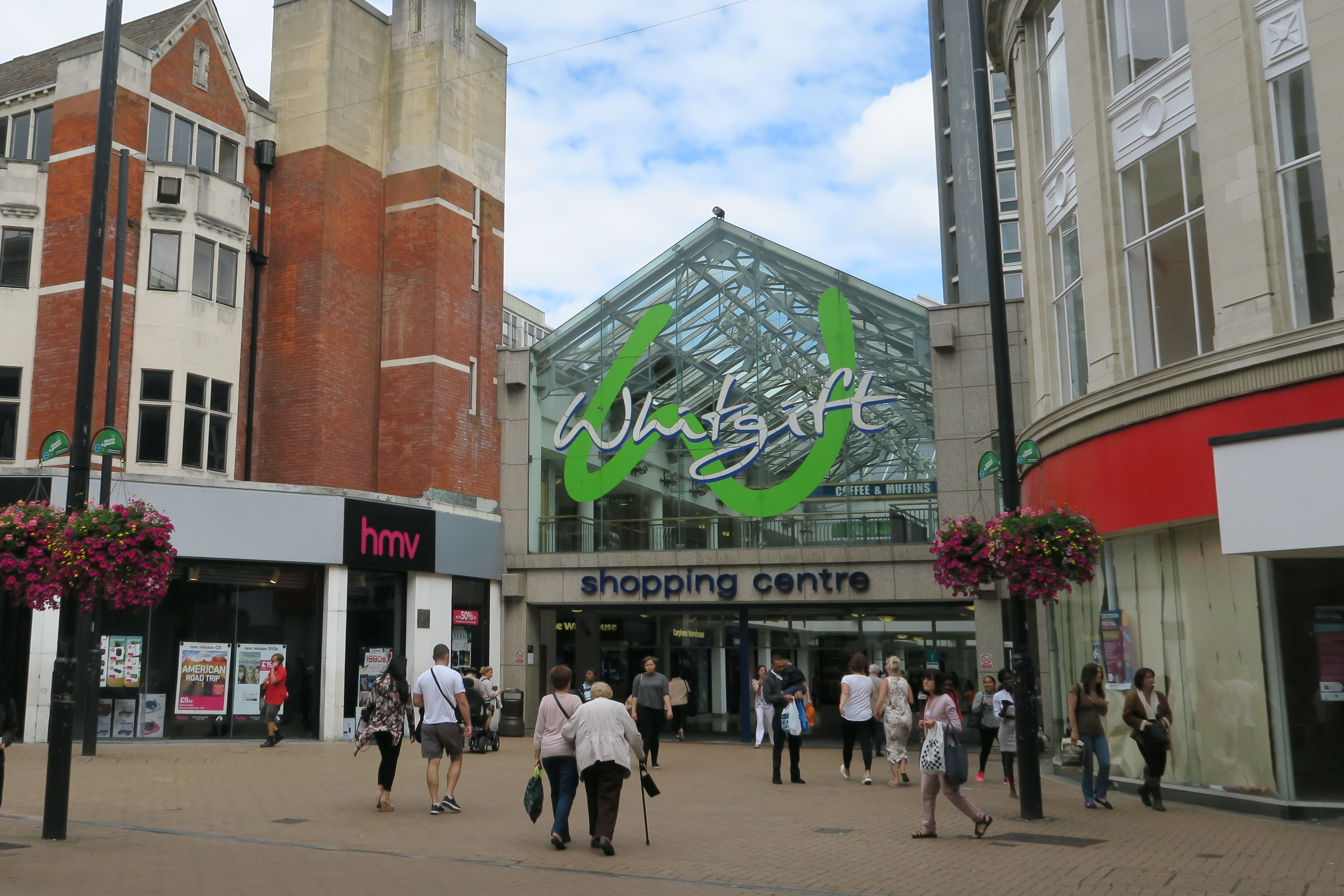
The Heart of Gaming moved to the Whitgift Centre in Croydon in 2017

The Acton venue was closed when its lease expired, and in April 2017 the arcade reopened in the Whitgift Centre in Croydon.

In February 2019, the venue hosted the first "Barkade", a gaming meetup for members of the furry fandom, wherein fursuiting is encouraged by attendees who own fursuits.

In July 2019, The Heart of Gaming was once again forced to close temporarily, after talks between Croydon Council and their landlord broke down over their premises. The arcade was set to move into what was the Clas Ohlson store in the centre, but its game machines could not be removed from the previous venue, which was inaccessible due to a decommissioned lift. The Heart of Gaming re-opened at the Clas Ohlson site on 4 October 2019.

== Price guide ==
A day pass for adults costs £20, while a day pass for persons under age 16 costs £15. The cloakroom costs £1 per item.
