= List of e-scooter regulations by country =

E-scooters are subject to regulation, including: usage of the bicycle infrastructure, pavement ban, pavement speed, legal liability insurance, helmet, age, allowed location, top design speed, training, risk of fire from batteries.

== Australia ==
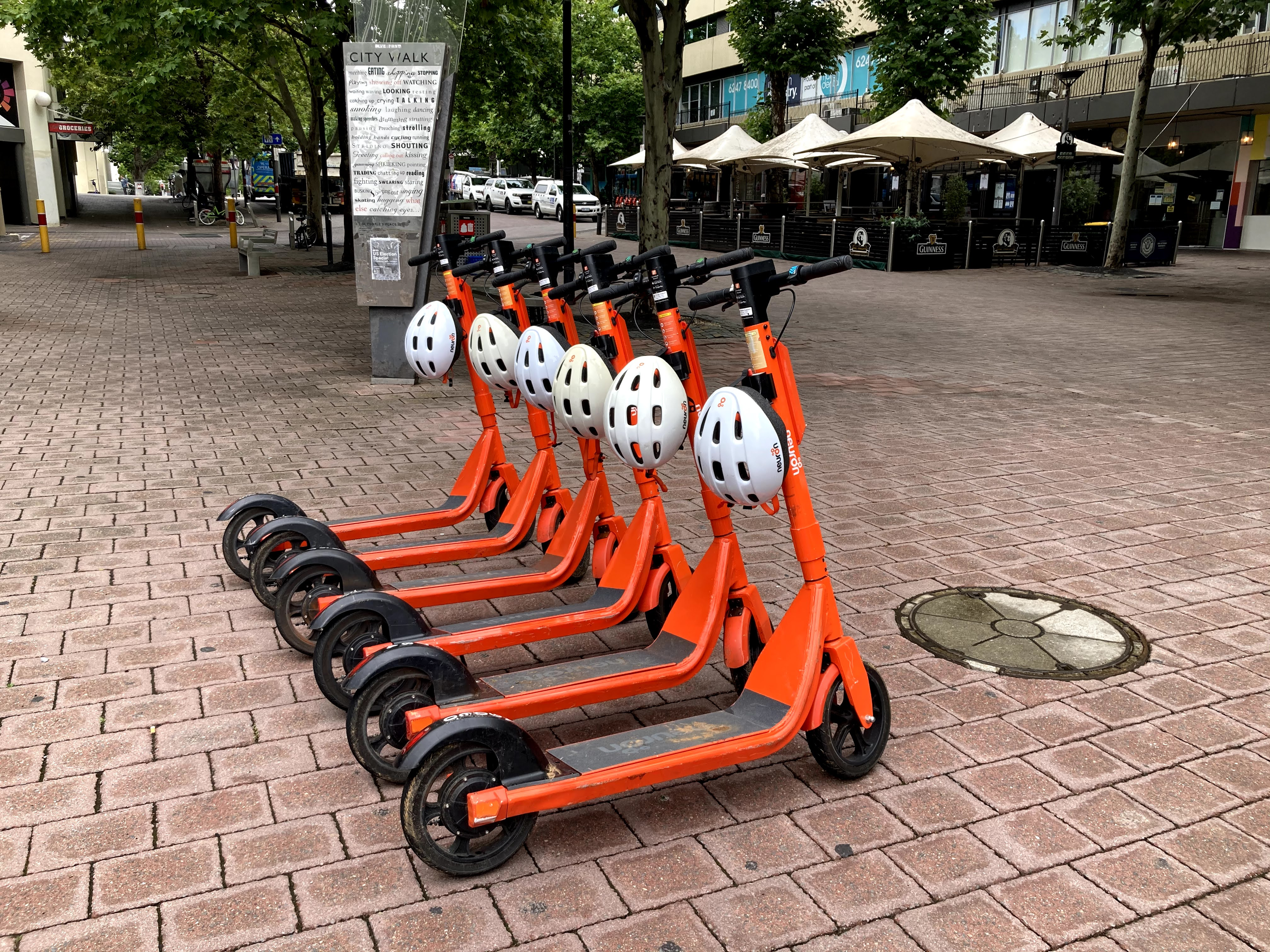
E-scooters with bicycle helmets in Canberra during 2020

In Queensland, the laws around the use of e-scooters and other personal mobility devices are made and enforced by the state government.

While some local governments in Queensland have not allowed Lime Scooter trials, Brisbane City Council is currently undertaking a Lime Scooter trial, along with Neuron Mobility and has invited tenders for two scooter contracts in the city.

In the ACT, the framework for personal mobility devices was amended to include e-scooters and other similar devices from 20 December 2019, permitting use on footpaths, shared paths, bicycle paths and the bicycle side of separated paths. Bicycle helmets are required to be worn.

Perth became the latest City to announce an e scooter trial, which launched in March 2023. This was suspended in June 2025, as a result of a pedestrians death due to a drunk driver.

== Austria ==
Electric vehicles with a power up to 600 watts and a speed up to 25 km/h are considered as bicycles.

== Belgium ==
Belgium's traffic rules were updated on 1 June 2019 to be in line with the European Commission guidelines formed in 2016. It became legal for people over 15 years of age to ride electric motorized scooters with speed limited to 25 km/h on public roads, mirroring e-bikes. Protective gear and insurance are not required by law.

== Canada ==
Commuting in Canada with an e-scooter has increased. As power-assisted bicycles, e-scooters must follow many of the same federal laws and regulations, such as being limited to 32 km/h and not being allowed over 500 W output. Ontario has recently unveiled a series of laws aimed at ensuring safety while using electric-kick scooters or, e-scooters. Riders are now also required to wear an approved helmet when operating their e-scooter and have bright lights installed on the front and back of their vehicles.

== Denmark ==
Since 1 January 2022, helmets are mandatory.

== Finland ==
In Finland, e-scooters must comply with the same rules as bicycles and the rider must be at least 15 years old. However, all e-scooters that have a maximum speed over 25 km/h are classified as small motorcycles and require a motor insurance.

== France ==
Currently France only allows e-scooters on footpaths if they have a maximum speed of 6 kilometres per hour (3.7 mph). Those travelling at up to 25 km/h are required to use bike lanes. Legislators are considering a new law that would force users of e-scooters going faster than 25 kilometres per hour (16 mph) to have a type A1 license—the same as for small motorcycles. The legal framework is very blurry and does not define where e-scooters may or may not be driven or parked. The Deputy Mayor of Paris Christophe Najdovski is lobbying Transport Minister Élisabeth Borne for a clearer framework that would give municipalities the power to tighten the rules on how permits are issued and how authorizations are given to deploy a fleet of e-scooters to operators.

French daily newspaper Le Parisien found that in 2017, e-scooters and roller skates combined caused 284 injuries and five deaths in France, a 23 percent increase on the previous year. The perception of e-scooters is that they are fast, silent and therefore dangerous, causing many accidents, and the need to legislate is urgent.

In an April 2023 referendum, voters in Paris chose to remove e-scooters from the city after the current vendor contracts expire. The ban applies to rental scooters which have been offered by several operators since 2018, although people will still be able to use privately owned contraptions.

== Germany ==
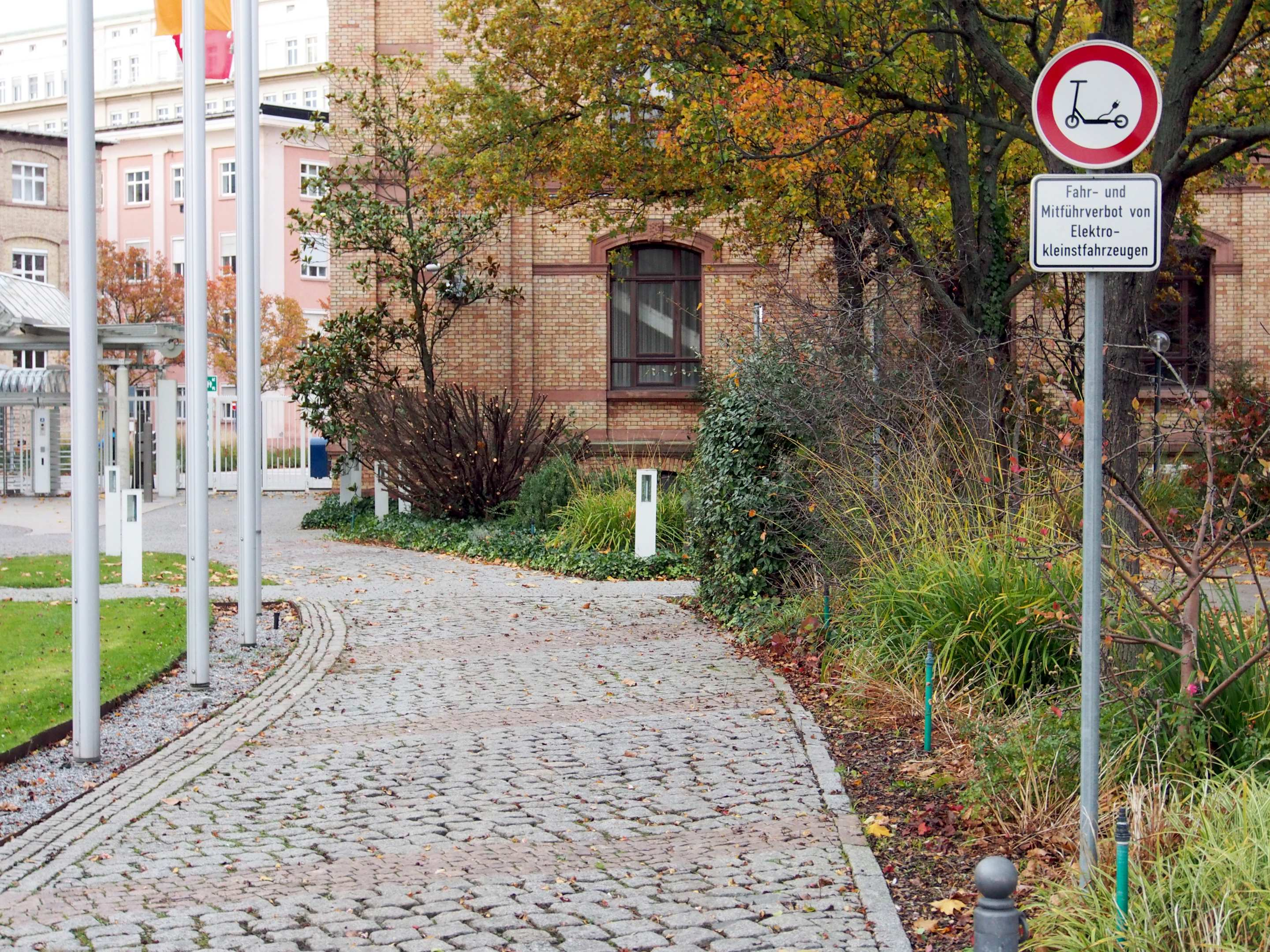
Sign prohibiting the riding or carrying of micro electric vehicles

In April 2019, low-power electric vehicles like e-scooters and segways were added to the regulatory list of vehicles allowed to circulate in the streets. The eKFV was enacted on 15 June 2019.

The regulation limits the maximum speed of these electric vehicles to 20 km/h and restricts them to cycle paths. Their operation requires a motor vehicle insurance and an insurance badge, but a driver's license is not required. Users have to be at least 14 years old. Crash accident are under-reported (74% missing) when counted as declaration to police rather than to the hospital.

The same rules for operating an automobile while intoxicated also apply to electric kick scooters.

== Ireland ==
The use of e-scooters and mono-wheels has exploded in Irish urban areas in recent years, with estimated more than 2,000 e-scooters regularly traveling the roads of Dublin.

Under existing road traffic legislation, the use of an e-scooter on public roads is not permitted. According to the Road Traffic Act 1961, all e-scooters are considered to be "mechanically propelled vehicles". Anyone using a mechanically propelled vehicle in a public place must have insurance, road tax, and a driving license. However, it is currently not possible to tax or insure e-scooters or electric skateboards.

In March 2019, e-scooter owners started reporting that the Irish police force, the Garda Síochána, had begun regularly seizing e-scooters on the grounds that the owner did not have insurance. This was despite a Freedom of Information request detailing that the Garda website displayed incorrect information to the public, detailing that e-scooters requiring human power to start would not be considered mechanically propelled vehicles and, as such, would fall outside the remit requiring insurance. The owner groups, such as eScoot.ie, have been publicly vocal, attracting media attention and urging e-scooter owners to sign a petition for lawmakers to legalize the public use of "electric rideables" in Ireland. Under growing pressure, the Minister for Transport Shane Ross asked the Road Safety Authority to research how e-scooters are regulated in other countries, particularly other EU member states. A decision is to be taken on whether or not to amend existing legislation. In August 2019 the Road Safety Authority submitted a report on the use of e-scooters to Ross. The report is broadly in favour of e-scooters, however a number of significant safety concerns were raised. The Minister have announced a two-month public consultation starting on 1 September 2019. The main areas of the consultation cover what personal protective equipment should be used, what training should be provided, what safety or certification standards devices should meet, what age restrictions should apply and where the devices can be used publicly.

In February 2021 Communications Minister Eamon Ryan approved draft legislation which will "regularise" e-scooters and electric bikes as commonly accepted means of transport under proposed new vehicle category, to be known as "Powered Personal Transporters" (PPTs), which will not require road tax, insurance or driving license.

== Japan ==
Japan is removing in July 2023 the requirement for escooter riders to have a driver's license. Scooters can be ridden on pavements where bicycles are allowed as long as they are slower than 6 kph and flash a green light.

== Netherlands ==
Limited numbers of approved e-scooters by the Dutch Ministry of Infrastructure and Water Management are permitted to drive on public roads and categorised as 'Bijzondere Bromfiets'. The speed limit is 25 km/h. Insurance, driving license and license plate are not required for the approved models by the state.

== New Zealand ==
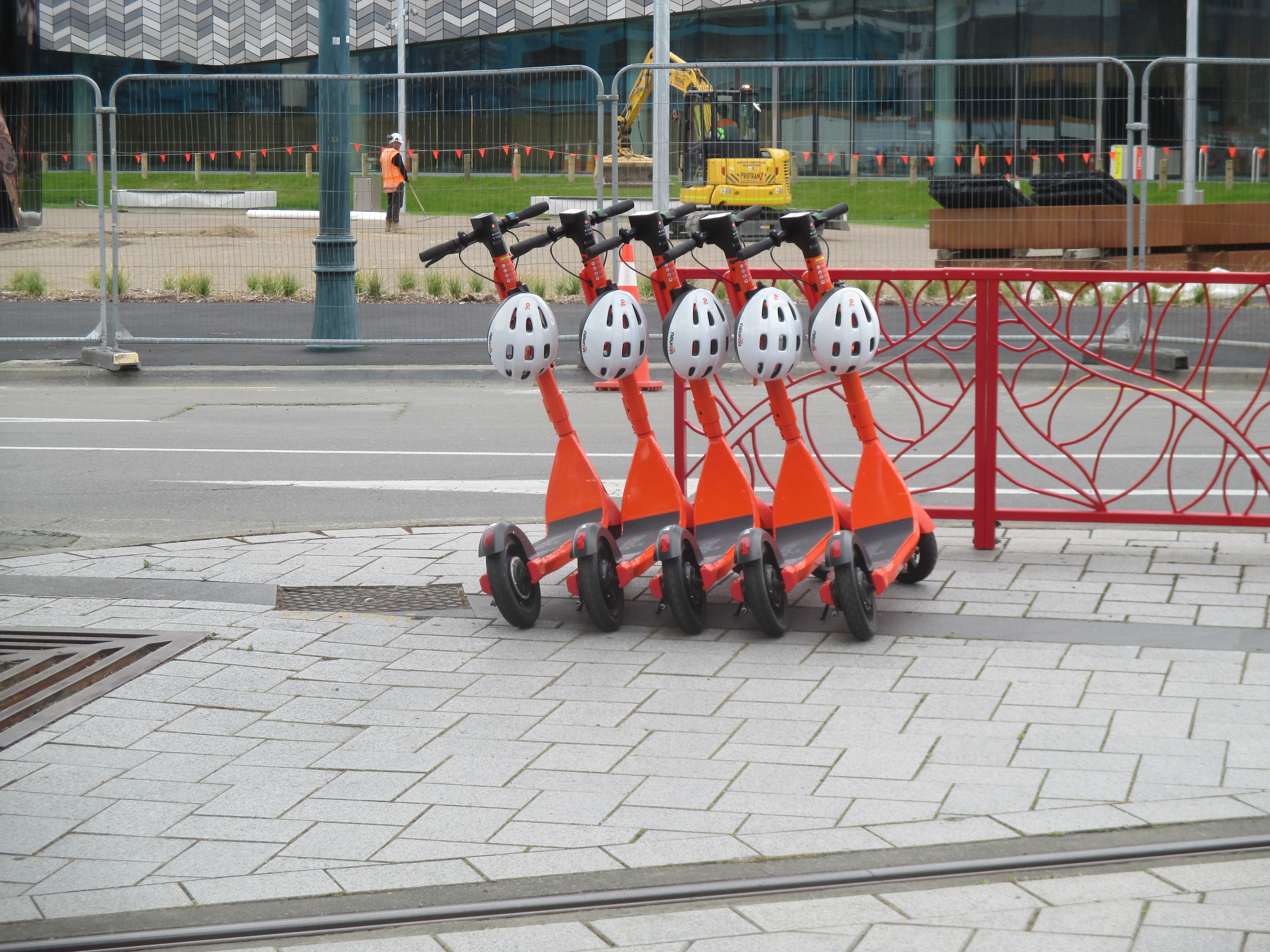
E-scooters in central Christchurch, New Zealand

E-scooters in New Zealand are classed as a 'Low-powered vehicle that does not require registration', provided that the output power is under 300 watts. They can therefore be ridden on footpaths, roads and separated cycleways. They cannot be ridden on paint-defined cycleways on the road. Helmets are not required, but recommended.

Despite this legislation, the power limitation regulations are not enforced, and it is not uncommon to see commuters using e-scooters with power ratings far beyond 300W.

== Norway ==
In Norway, e-scooters are classed as bicycles, and can therefore be ridden on footpaths, roads and separated cycleways as well as paint-defined cycleways on the road. Maximum speed is restricted to 20 km/h. Maximum weight of the e-scooter, including the battery, must not exceed 70 kg. Maximum width must not exceed 85 cm and maximum length is 120 cm. There is no age restriction or requirement to wear a helmet.

Helmets for children up to 15 years are mandatory since spring 2022.

Blood Alcohol Concentration (BAC) is limited to 0.2 gram per liter as for car drivers.

There can be only 1 person on the e-scooter (passengers not allowed).

== Poland ==
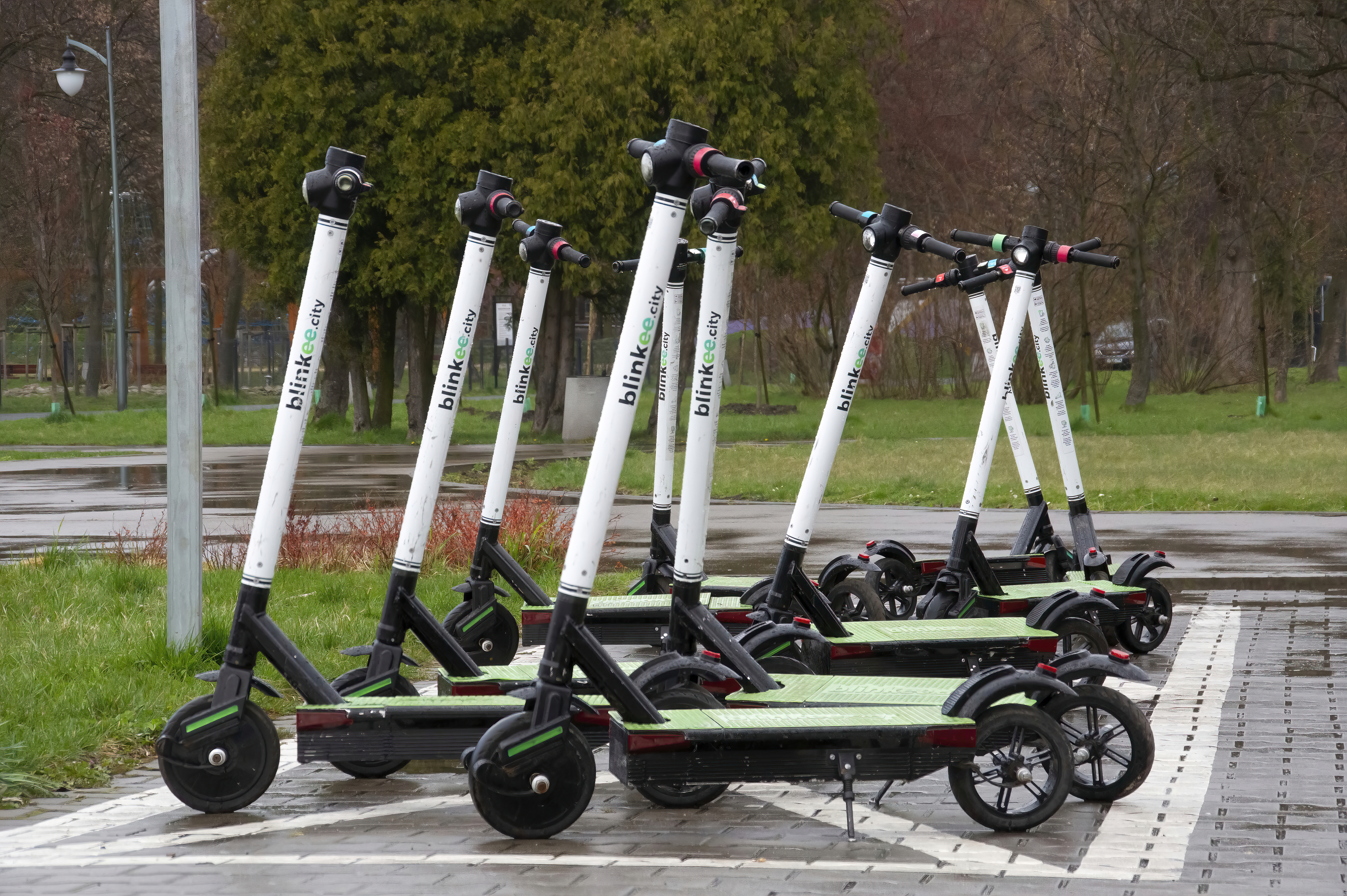
Electric kicks scooter in Poland

Following a court case, a new provision of the Road Traffic Act came into force as of 21 April 2019, whereby an e-scooter falls under the definition of a moped (power up to 4 kW, max speed 45 km/h). Therefore, such vehicles are not allowed to ride on the footpaths as well as bicycle lanes. However, due to the lack of homologation, it is not possible to register an e-scooter as a road vehicle, which makes it illegal for use on the road. The legislators are now working on changes to the law to introduce the definition of the Personal Transport Device, which would allow e-scooters to be used on footpaths and bicycle lanes.

From May 20, 2021, the regulations on the traffic of e-scooters are in force. An e-scooter is an electric powered vehicle, two-axle, with a steering wheel, without a seat and without pedals, designed to be driven only by the rider on that vehicle.

To drive an e-scooter on the road by people aged 10 to 18, it is required to have the same qualifications as for cycling, i.e. a bicycle card or driving license of categories AM, A1, B1 or T. For people over 18 years, such a document is not required.

== Singapore ==
E-scooters in Singapore are categorized as Personal Mobility Devices (PMD), and as such, are subjected to the Land Transport Authority's regulations. All e-scooter owners are required to register their devices with the Land Transport Authority and affix the registration number on their scooter. E-scooters that are not registered by 1 July 2019 will have their devices seized by the authorities and the offender would be liable for punishment.

E-scooters sold in Singapore have to comply with a strict set of regulations; maximum speed of 25 kilometres per hour (16 mph), must not exceed 70 cm in width & must not weigh more than 20 kg. Retailers are allowed to sell non-compliant e-scooters however they have to indicate clearly that they can only be used on private property or for use overseas.

Unlike electric bicycles, e-scooters can only be ridden on footpaths and cycling paths. They are not allowed to be ridden on public roads.

== Spain ==
E-scooters' recurring role in traffic accidents has led to a regulatory pushback in Spain. There have been reported 273 accidents, three of which were fatal in 2018. Spanish legislators are working on a regulation banning e-scooters from footpaths and limiting their speed to 25 kilometres per hour (16 mph).

The first ever person hit by e-scooter died in Spain in August 2019. A 92-year-old woman fell and struck her head to the pavement when an e-scooter hit her, travelling at less than 10 kilometres per hour (6.2 mph).

Spain is introducing technical standards and mandatory helmets.

== Turkey ==
E-scooters can be used on cycle paths, and on urban roads without cycle paths where the speed limit is below 50 kph.

== United Kingdom ==
Privately owned e-scooters are deemed to be Personal Light Electric Vehicles, subject to legal requirements regarding MOT testing, tax, and driver licensing. In practice they cannot be made to meet the requirements for road use, and they also may not be used on footways. In some trial areas from mid-2020 to November 2022, rental e-scooters were permitted to be ridden on roads and cycle lanes, but not footways; riders had to be 16 or over and have a provisional or full driving licence. Using a phone, riding under the influence of alcohol, and other risks, were not allowed, as for other motor vehicles. Private scooters ridden on roads or footways may be seized and destroyed. In July 2023, the police and crime commissioner for Kent called on police to seize and crush all e-scooters being ridden on public land. Seizure was relatively uncommon; in December 2021 West Midlands Police announced that they had seized and destroyed 140 e-scooters. However, in the first half of 2026 the Metropolitan Police of London seized 2,500 illegal e-bikes and e-scooters. These vehicles were often used for criminal purposes; the seizures were reported to have been followed by a 23% reduction in offences of theft from the person and 11% in personal robbery.

In 2022 a woman riding a rental scooter erratically while over the legal limit for alcohol pleaded guilty to drink-driving. She had not known that it was an offence, but was fined, and banned from driving any vehicle for 18 months.

Many serious fires have been caused by the lithium batteries used by e-scooters, mostly from privately-owned scooters with unregulated charging systems. This has led to e-scooters being banned from much public transport.

=== Casualties ===
In 2024, 1,390 casualties, mostly young and male, were recorded in collisions involving an e-scooter in England, Scotland and Wales; similar annual numbers were recorded since a big increase in 2021. Most (1,096) were e-scooter riders. Five riders and one pedestrian were killed in 2024. It is thought that the reported figures are an underestimate, and that more accidents involved privately owned, rather than rental, e-scooters. This has led to calls for increased regulation.

The first UK fatality involving an e-scooter occurred on 12 July 2019 when 35-year-old Emily Hartridge was killed in Battersea, London in a collision of her scooter on a roundabout with a truck. London's cycling commissioner said that "new regulations must be put forward quickly" as e-scooters were "currently not safe—with no restrictions on speeds, no mandatory brakes and lights, and no rules on who can ride them and where".

The first death of a pedestrian hit by an e-scooter occurred on 8 June 2022, when the 71-year-old victim died in hospital after being hit by a scooter ridden by a 14-year-old boy on 2 June.

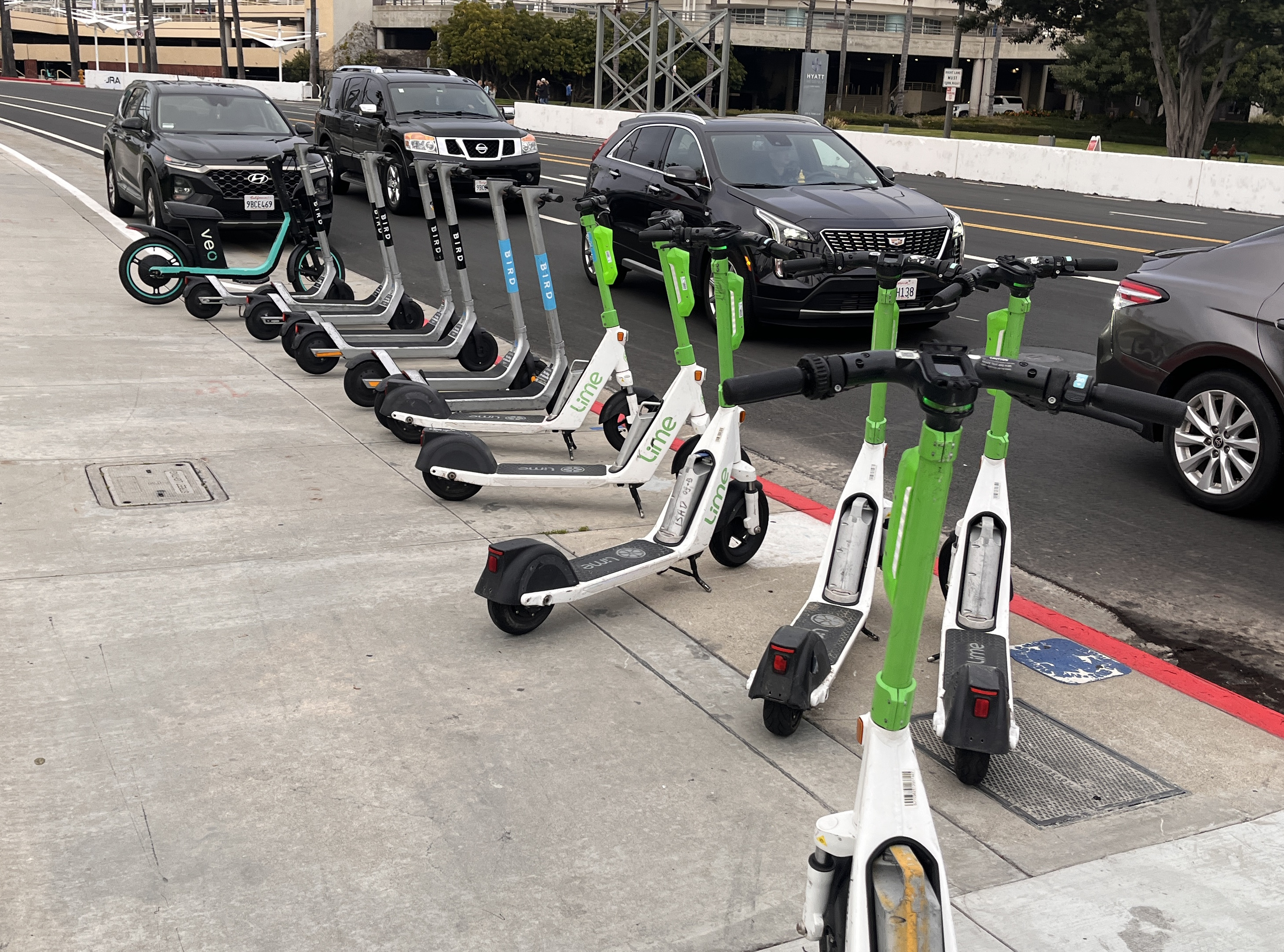
Different motorized scooters available in Long Beach, California in March 2023, including those from Bird, Lime and Veo

== United States ==
Rules in the United States vary by state. Motorized scooters are often not street legal, as they cannot be tagged, titled, insured, and do not meet federal requirements for lights or mirrors. Particular localities may have further ordinances that limit the use of motorized scooters. The top speed of the average motorized scooter is around 20 miles per hour (32 km/h). Due to their small wheels, motorized scooters are not typically safe for street use as even the smallest bumps can cause an accident.

California, for example, requires that a person riding a motorized scooter on a street be 16 years of age or older, have a valid driver's license, be wearing a bicycle helmet, have no passengers, and otherwise follow the same rules of the road the same as cars do. The motorized scooter must have brakes, may not have handlebars raised above the operator's shoulders, and if ridden at night must have a headlight, a taillight, and side reflectors. A motorized scooter may not be operated on sidewalks or on streets if the posted speed limit is over 25 miles per hour (40 km/h) unless in a Class II bicycle lane.

Michigan laws treat motorized scooters similarly to bicycles. They are typically allowed on sidewalks, bike lanes, and roads.

In Washington, D.C., motorized scooters are classified as Personal Mobility Devices, and are therefore not considered motor vehicles. This means there is no inspection, license, insurance, or registration required. Additionally, this means that motorized scooters are allowed on the sidewalks, and helmets are not required.

In Georgia, motorized scooters are considered Electric Personal Assistive Mobility Devices, meaning they can be used on sidewalks and highways where the speed limit is at most 35 miles per hour (56 km/h), or in the bike lane. The law also specifies that users of Electric Personal Assistive Mobility Devices, including motorized scooter riders, "have the same rights and duties as prescribed for pedestrians".

Scooter sharing companies have rules for operation printed on both the scooter and in the app, which includes instructions to not ride on the sidewalk. Given that the laws regarding motorized scooters vary from state to state, the scooter sharing instructions can differ from the local law.

== See also ==
- Anti-cycling sentiment
