= Dara Ó Briain's Go 8 Bit =

British comedy panel game show

- Genre: Comedy Panel game
- Created by: Steve McNeil; Sam Pamphilon
- Written by: Dominic English (Series 1); James Menzies (Series 2 & 3)
- Directed by: Steve Smith (Series 1, Various Series 2 & 3); Jan Genesis (Various Series 2 & 3)
- Presented by: Dara Ó Briain
- Starring: Team Captains; Steve McNeil; Sam Pamphilon; Gaming Expert; Ellie Gibson
- Theme music composer: Liam Tate
- Country of origin: United Kingdom
- Original language: English
- No. of series: 3
- No. of episodes: 27

Production
- Executive producers: Donald Taffner, Jr. Michaela Hennessy-Vass (Series 2–3); John Bartlett (Best Of); Iain Coyle (UKTV); Simon Lupton (UKTV – Ep. 1)
- Producers: Darren Sole (Series Producer); Rohan Acharya (Series 1, Best Of); Ross Murray (Series 2–3)
- Production locations: Fountain Studios (Series 1); BBC Elstree Centre (Series 2–3)
- Editors: Jason Boxall (Series 1); Fergus March (Series 1, Best Of); Luke Crockett (Series 2); James Curry (Series 2 & 3); Jon Ellis (Series 2 & 3); Duncan Hart (Series 2 & 3); Tom McPhee (Series 2 & 3); Michael Pearce (Series 2 & 3)
- Running time: 60 minutes (inc. adverts)
- Production company: DLT Entertainment UK LTD

Original release
- Network: Dave
- Release: 5 September 2016 – 16 April 2018

Dara O Briain's Go 8 Bit is a British comedy panel game show, hosted by comedian Dara Ó Briain, co-starring video game journalist Ellie Gibson, and premiered on Dave on 5 September 2016. The show's format is themed around two teams – English comedians Steve McNeil and Sam Pamphilon as team captains, along with a guest member for each team – competing in a series of rounds against each other for points through various video games. Games featured in the programme ranged from past classic, modern releases and indie games, as well as a specially designed round themed on a particular game. The winner of each episode is the team to secure the most points after five rounds, with the number of points determined by an audience vote.

The show was originally conceived by McNeil and Pamphilon for the 2013 Edinburgh Festival Fringe, before it was later pitched for television in 2016. After the first series, UKTV commissioned two more series of the programme, allowing viewers to watch a new episode via their on-demand service UKTV Play, a week before it would be broadcast on Dave. The show spawned a spin-off show, entitled Go 8 Bit DLC and presented by Gibson, McNeil and Pamphilon, that was aired alongside each episode of the second series, and also featured a one-hour special, entitled The Best of Dara O Briain's Go 8 Bit and aired on 5 February 2018, featuring the best bits of series 1 and 2.

On 28 September 2018, following the conclusion of the third series, UKTV cancelled production on Dara O Briain's Go 8 Bit; at present, however, it has not ruled out a return of the programme.

== Origins ==
In 2013, McNeil and Pamphilon began work to devise a show they would perform for the Edinburgh Festival Fringe that year. The comedians had very little on ideas for what they would create, but eventually settled on the idea of using video games to create humour. Their concept, entitled McNeil & Pamphilon Go 8-Bit!, focused on them leading teams that competed against each other via playing video games, with the loser having to take a forfeit. Examples of forfeits that occurred included McNeil being punched, and Pamphilon eating a whole jar of jalapeño peppers. When interviewed by The Guardian about the concept they created, McNeil explained the reasoning behind their idea:

"We'd had the idea of doing a late night show on Friday and Saturday nights, just for fun, where we'd get comedians drunk and then encourage them to abuse each other while they played retro games – purely for shenanigans. Somewhat tediously, it was more successful than anything else we'd done up to that point. So we kept doing it."

While the show's popularity led to it featuring on the Fringe the following year, the concept was seen to have potential. The television rights were optioned by production company DLT Entertainment UK Limited, who assigned producer Rohan Acharya to develop its format for television. The basic development of the programme established a budget that allowed six episodes to be produced as a sales tool, with a presentation of the televised concept performed at The Tabernacle in 2014. After watching the presentation, Dave gave the green light to supporting the show and taking on its six episodes, a decision that was further assisted by Dara Ó Briain agreeing to become the show's host; his attachment to it led to the show's name changing to become Dara O Briain's Go 8 Bit. To assist in its development on Dave, Darren Sole was brought on as Series Producer. When the show was given a live performance in a London pub, Ellie Gibson became immediately interested in what she saw and auditioned for a role on the programme as a gaming expert, which she subsequently secured.

== Format ==
The show focuses on comedians McNeil and Pamphilon as the captain of their own team, with each episode seeing them joined by a guest teammate. The goal for both teams is to secure the most points after five rounds of competitive gaming. The rules for each round vary, depending on the game being played and the mode of gameplay used – for example, the rules could state that the teams have to maintain the highest score when the allotted playing time is up, while in another game, the rules could stipulate that it is the best of five matches to determine the winner and team members switch controllers after each match. While Gibson provides overall information on each game that is played by the teams, in a humorous style, along with the rules for winning each round, both she and Ó Briain also provide commentary when a game is underway.

The main stage used for the show, where the host, expert and teams are situated on, features a special mechanism which allows it to move 90 degrees clockwise and anticlockwise between two positions – the "Play" position, which faces the teams towards a large screen used for the majority of rounds to play video games on, except for the final round, in which they face a special stage to play a unique game on it; and the "Rest" position, used between rounds. Both teams each sit at a couch for the duration of the show, except the final round, with each having a desk space set in front of them that is laden with various console controllers and a keyboard and mouse, depending on the choice of games being used. In some cases where the teams are playing an arcade video game, an arcade machine of the game is set up on the stage.

Each episode consists of five rounds that are played as follows:

- Round 1 – A classic video game played by both teams. In this round, members of both team switch play when the current player is "KOed" during gameplay.
- Round 2 & 3 – The favourite game of each guest. The guest that is playing competes against the opposing team's captain.
- Round 4 – A modern indie game or a big hit game, played by both teams.
- Round 5 – A humorous take on a game, done up with life-size controller scheme, and played in a special stage area behind the screen. The game usually involves the guests playing this.

The team that wins a round receives a set number of points that are determined before it begins via an audience vote. Prior to each episode, the audience are given log-in details to a voting app they can use on their phone. When a round is set to commence, the audience are asked to vote on the team they believe will win it, with voting ended upon the stage set to the Play position. The highest percentage value from the vote tally, becomes the points that are on offer for the winning team – for example, if the vote ends with team A getting 36% of the vote, and team B getting 64% of the vote, then the winner of the round will receive 64 points. For the final round, the number of points on offer is doubled. In the event of a tie, both teams receive points based on the number for the round.

== Episodes ==
=== Series overview ===
Series	Start date	End date	Episodes
1	5 September 2016	10 October 2016	6
2	15 May 2017	17 July 2017	10
3	12 February 2018	16 April 2018	10

Date	Entitle
5 February 2018	The Best of...

The coloured backgrounds denote the result of each of the shows:

– indicates Steve's team won
– indicates Sam's team won

=== Series 1 (2016) ===
Episode	First broadcast	Steve's guest	Sam's guest	Scores	Games Played	Viewers
1	5 September 2016	Susan Calman	David James	257–126	Tetris Party, Chuckie Egg, Tekken 2, Star Wars Battlefront, Makey Makey	596,000
2	12 September 2016	Marcus Brigstocke	Gina Yashere	266–154	Sonic the Hedgehog 2, Portal 2, Snake, LittleBigPlanet 3, Keep Talking and Nobody Explodes	696,000
3	19 September 2016	Bob Mortimer	Holly Walsh	307–127	Galaxian, Resident Evil 3: Nemesis, Flick Kick Football Legends, Rocket League, Storm Rider	675,000
4	26 September 2016	Rachel Riley	Russell Howard	133–246	Street Fighter II: Hyper Fighting, Temple Run, Sensible Soccer, Nidhogg, Track & Field	641,000
5	3 October 2016	Dave Gorman	Josie Long	125–253	Pac-Man, Toybox Turbos, Frogger, Gang Beasts, Pong	610,000
6	10 October 2016	Jason Manford	Ed Byrne	198–235	Asteroids, FIFA 16, Big Buck Hunter Pro, Trials Fusion, Kororinpa	453,000

=== Series 2 (2017) ===
Episode	First broadcast	Steve's guest	Sam's guest	Scores	Games Played	Viewers
1	15 May 2017	Sara Pascoe	Richard Osman	129–244	Galaga, Doodle Jump, Micro Machines, Human: Fall Flat, Block Block	389,000
2	22 May 2017	Rob Beckett	Zoe Lyons	225–231	Gran Turismo, Uncharted 4: A Thief's End, Horace Goes Skiing, Goat Simulator, Whac-a-Mole	387,000
3	29 May 2017	Sara Cox	Daniel Sloss	155–302	Wipeout, Crossy Road, FIFA 17, Octodad: Dadliest Catch, Kwik Snax	415,000
4	5 June 2017	Ellie Taylor	Jon Richardson	194–197	Crash Team Racing, Aztec Challenge, DuckTales, SpeedRunners, Combat	355,000
5	12 June 2017	Vernon Kay	Bec Hill	274–152	Tapper, Call of Duty: Advanced Warfare, Grand Prix Simulator, What the Box?, Driveclub	372,000
6	19 June 2017	Gemma Cairney	Robert Webb	391–58	1942, Jetpac, Angry Birds, Overcooked, Tilt Brush	362,000
7	26 June 2017	Russell Kane	Lolly Adefope	414–61	Ghosts 'n Goblins, Lemmings, Tricky Towers, Sportsfriends, VR The Diner Duo	356,000
8	3 July 2017	Edith Bowman	Elis James	215–123	Mega Man 2, Snowboard Party, Street Fighter V, Lance a Lot, Fruit Ninja VR	461,000
9	10 July 2017	Jamali Maddix	Liza Tarbuck	210–213	Crash Bandicoot, Far Cry 3, Bomb Jack, Golf With Your Friends, Area 51	316,000
10	17 July 2017	Kerry Howard	Ore Oduba	150–247	Tony Hawk's Skateboarding, Tomb Raider, X-Men vs. Street Fighter, Robot Roller-Derby Disco Dodgeball, Alex Kidd in Miracle World	300,000

=== Series 3 (2018) ===
Episode	First broadcast	Steve's guest	Sam's guest	Scores	Games Played	Viewers
1	12 February 2018	Gregg Wallace	Jodie Kidd	427–136	Spy Hunter, Total War: Rome II, Battlefield 1, Push Me Pull You, Game & Watch: Chef	375,000
2	19 February 2018	Dr. Maggie Aderin-Pocock	Josh Widdicombe	334–71	Defender, Love You To Bits, Football Manager 2017, Battlezone VR, Chicken Jump	263,000
3	26 February 2018	Jessica Knappett	Matt Forde	262–132	Gauntlet, The Sims, Need for Speed, Headmaster VR, Trog	337,000
4	5 March 2018	Devin Griffin	Susan Calman	303–146	Minecraft, Ark: Survival Evolved, Batman: Arkham Asylum, Balloon Chair Death Match, Toobin'	367,000
5	12 March 2018	Suzi Ruffell	Jonathan Ross	160–137	Final Fight, Aladdin, Titanfall 2, Totally Accurate Battle Simulator, Sparc	279,000
6	19 March 2018	Nish Kumar	Anna Richardson	288–122	Virtua Fighter, Alien: Isolation, Worms Armageddon, Shovel Knight, Space Invaders	278,000
7	26 March 2018	John Thomson	Natalie Cassidy	206–218	Rampage, Wolfenstein 3-D, Sonic the Hedgehog, B.U.T.T.O.N, Final Furlong	329,000
8	2 April 2018	Kevin Bridges	Natasia Demetriou	216–223	Joust, Plants vs. Zombies, Tekken, Can't drive this, Bible Adventures	
9	9 April 2018	Katherine Ryan	Phil Wang	131–290	Rayman, Mario Kart 8 Deluxe, Time Crisis 5, BeeBeeQ, Just Dance 2017	264,000
10	16 April 2018	Jayde Adams	Simon Gregson	255–133	Super Mario Bros., Call of Duty: Advanced Warfare, Rock Band, Joe Danger 2: The Movie, Job Simulator	

== Scores ==
Steve	Sam
Series wins (1 drawn)
1	1
Episode wins (0 drawn)
14	12
