= Chris Slight =

Video game show host

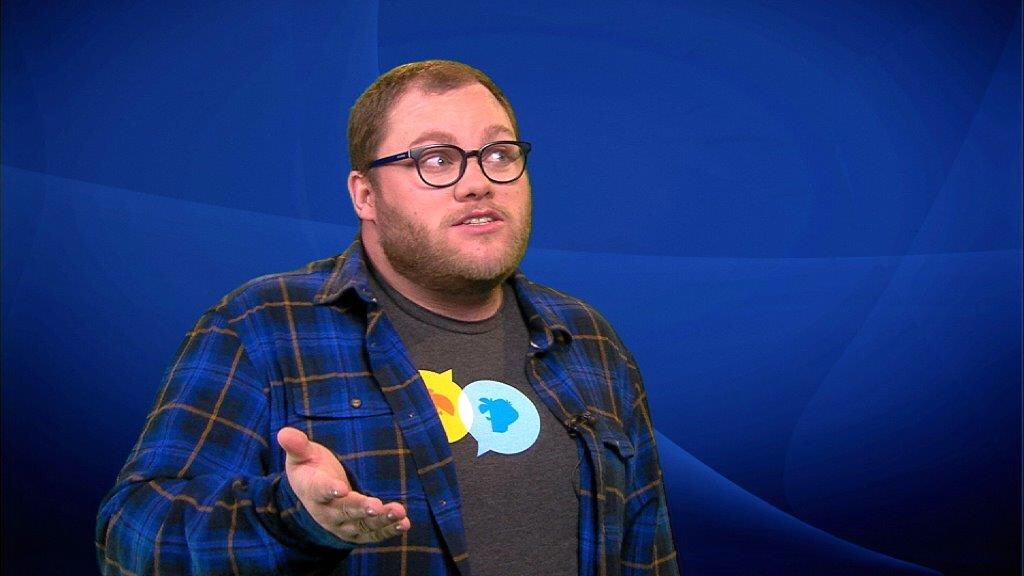
Chris Slight on Sky News

Chris Slight is a videogames TV presenter and live stage presenter who has worked with the likes of Sky TV, CNBC, Challenge TV and Ginx TV. His live work has seen him host stages at PAX South, TwitchCon and PLAY Expo.

== Career ==
Chris Slight was first seen on Ginx TV's show Ginx LIVE where he hosted the social media corner, going on to host the show in the absence of regular host Adam Savage. It was around this time that Chris first appeared on Sky News show Swipe where he reviewed games, which he still appears on regularly to this day. He also regularly appears as a talking head on the Challenge TV show Videogame Nation.

Chris hosted the streaming output for London-based Loading Bar, a gaming-centric bar who had taken to Twitch with an all day streaming format including interviews, gameplay and chat.

Chris hosted the Taco Bell Indie Game Garage Powered by indie[dot]xsplit at TwitchCon 2015 where he interviewed various indie developers live on stage.

Chris was featured on the MCV 30 Under 30 list for 2015.

In September 2015, Chris was nominated for a Games Media Award in the streaming category along with comedian Steve McNeil for their show TwoMoreWhiteGuys.

In January 2016, Chris hosted the indie[dot]xsplit stage for the full three days of PAX South interviewing the likes of Rami Ismail.

During the London Games Festival in 2016 Chris hosted the Virtual Reality Summit at the BFI Southbank.

Chris returned to host the indie[dot]xsplit stage at PAX East in April 2016 for the full three days interviewing a wide range of indie developers.

Chris has gone on to host stages at E3 for Devolver Digital in 2016 & 2017, who he joined as a streamer on their Devolver Public Access Twitch channel.

== Filmography ==
| Year | Title | Role |
|---|---|---|
| 2014 - 2015 | Ginx LIVE | Cutaway host/main host |
| 2014- | Sky News Swipe | Games reviewer |
| 2014- | Videogame Nation | Talking head |
| 2015 | Ginx TV Presents The ESL League of Legends Finals | Co-host |
| 2015 | CNBC Closing Bell | Gaming expert |
| 2015 | E3 Today, Tonight | Co-host |
| 2015 | The Players Lounge | Host |
| 2015 | The Official UK Top 40 Videogames Chart | Co-host |

== Stage presentation ==
| Year | Event | Stage | Role |
|---|---|---|---|
| 2015 | TwitchCon 2015 | Taco Bell Presents The Indie Game Garage Powered by indie[dot]xsplit | Host |
| 2015 | PLAY Expo Manchester | GamerDisco Stage | Co-host |
| 2015 | MCM Comic Con | Ginx TV/ESL UK Stage | Host |
| 2016 | PAX South | indie[dot]xsplit Stage | Host |
| 2016 | London Games Festival | Virtual Reality Summit | Host |
| 2016 | PAX East | indie[dot]xsplit Stage | Host |
