= Steve McNeil =

British Twitch and TV host (born 1979)

- Born: Steven John McNeil; 1 September 1979 (age 47); Milton Keynes, United Kingdom
- Occupations: Streamer, podcaster, TV presenter, actor, writer and comedian
- Years active: 2014–present
- Notable work: Videogame Nation (2014–2016); Dara O Briain's Go 8 Bit (2016–2018); Go 8 Bit DLC (2017)
- Website: Official website

Steve McNeil (born 1 September 1979) is a British comedian, Twitch streamer, author, and TV host who is best known as co-creator and team captain on video-game comedy TV show Dara O Briain's Go 8 Bit. Steve has also created content for Ginx TV, and is one half of the Go 8 Bit spin-off project WiFi Wars, a live interactive video-game comedy show.

== Career ==
Following a degree in Business Management and various jobs in fitness franchises close to his home of Milton Keynes, Steve trained as an actor at the ALRA Theatre School; it was his acting credentials that first exposed him to comedy by responding to an acting call for a 'white, middle-class man' and joining Brendon Burns' Perrier Award-winning 2007 show So I Suppose This Is Offensive Now? which he had originally taken up merely to subsidise being at the Edinburgh Fringe. This connected him with directors Matt Holt & Rohan Acharya, and under their guidance Steve began to explore comedy more. Steve pulled together comedy troupe of 15 friends who trained together. Over time the group gradually thinned in numbers leaving himself and fellow actor/comedian Sam Pamphilon as a sketch comedy double act.

In 2009 McNeil & Pamphilon started writing sketch comedy together and later that year won the 10th Anniversary London Sitcom Trials with End to End, which brought them onto the BBC's radar and they subsequently wrote for a number of projects that were never released including Funny Plus One and For The Win. McNeil & Pamphilon placed in the semi-finals of 2010's So You Think You're Funny and 2011's Amused Moose Laughter Awards, placing in their Top 10 Fringe Shows.

During this time Steve continued acting; he features in 2009 ITV drama Stockwell, stood in for Rik Mayall in a production of Michael Frayn's Balmoral and following this was personally asked by Frayn to perform in a world premiere of a Chekov translation. He also joined MTV prank show Flash Prank as a regular cast member fooling members of the public.

In 2013, struggling to put a show together for the Edinburgh Fringe, McNeil (a lover of video-games) & Sam Pamphilon decided to create a show where comedians played video-games for entertainment:

I'd got a Nintendo Wii, and there was quite a lot of good retro stuff on that, so we figured if we plugged that in with a big screen and got our mates like Josh Widdicombe and Nish Kumar drunk and got them to swear at each other while they played Mario Kart, we figured we could charge drunk Scottish people 10 quid a go to watch it. Tediously, it became far more successful than the shows we'd spent years crafting as scripts.

In the show, McNeil & Pamphilon Go 8 Bit, audiences were split into two teams, Team McNeil and Team Pamphilon, and would watch top-name comedians go head-to-head in classic retro games including Street Fighter and Bomberman. Comedians Richard Soames, Nish Kumar and Paul Foxcroft often joined as commentators with support from Guy Kelly and resident 'Punishment Twat' Will Heartley. The captain and/or comedian of whichever team lost the round would have to suffer a forfeit such as eating a bowl of jalapeños or drinking a sardine smoothie. Following their first trip to Edinburgh the show was quickly picked up for TV, with Rohan Achraya as producer. Simultaneously Rob "King Rob" Sedgebeer approached Steve and Sam with the prospect of developing technology that would allow audience members to play games by logging into a Wi-Fi network and broadcasting browser-based games into their devices without installing anything onto them. This prospect excited Steve and Sam, and also comedian Dara O'Briain with whose backing the TV show got greenlit.

In 2013 Steve started working with Ginx TV, and from 2014 to 2016 he was promoted to guest host for some of their programming. Also during 2014–2016 Steve was a contributor to and infrequent guest host of Videogame Nation, contributing segments such as Steve McNeil's Weird Video Game Segment and various presenter head-to-head competitions.

In 2014 Steve McNeil and Rob Sedgebeer were invited to the Royal Institution Christmas Lecture to demonstrate the power of virtual reality, by showing a volunteer a film of a rollercoaster journey whilst asking them to hold a tray with plastic glasses as still as possible. Following the success of their appearance they were asked back as part of the 2015 Royal Institution Summer Programme, and developed the show WiFi Wars where audience members compete against each other across retro classics including Pong (which also featured as the closing section of Go 8 Bit live shows), Asteroids, Pac-Man, Frogger, Galaxian, Track & Field and more. WiFi Wars has had an Annual Lecture every July since, and in their 2016 Lecture Steve and Rob Sedgebeer broke the Guinness World Record for Most People Playing a Single Game of Pong with 286 players. WiFi Wars continues to have a place at the Royal Institution with regular Debug live shows where new games and technologies are tried out with the audience.

On 18 September 2015, a new podcast launched which featured McNeil as part of its four-man group. Game Friends launched to number two on iTunes 'Games and Hobbies' chart, as well as 'videogames'.

Also in 2015, he was nominated for a Games Media Award for his podcast Twomorewhiteguys, as well as Videogame Nation which Steve contributed to.

Dara O'Briain's Go 8 Bit was first shown on Dave in 2016, and featured Steve and Sam Pamphilon as Team Captains each joined by a guest comedian, hosted by Dara O'Briain and with video-games journalist Ellie Gibson as commentator. Before each game the audience voted on which team believed they would win, using Rob Sedgebeer's technology from the live shows. Additionally, each live show was rounded off with an audience game of Pong, as the live shows had, although this was not broadcast. The program ran for three series and was joined by companion show Go 8 Bit: DLC for Series 3 where Steve and Sam would interview the guests in more detail about their relationship with video games. Three series of Go 8 Bit were made, before in September 2018, McNeil discovered on Twitter that the show had been cancelled.

The success of the soon-regular WiFi Wars live shows combined with uncertain prospects of Go 8 Bit led to the creation of The Video Game Game Show Show by Steve McNeil and Rob Sedgebeer, taking the audience participation of Rob's technology and having top comedy acts be team captains and perform short interstitial sets. Launched on 24 October 2017, the show currently has a monthly residency at The Phoenix pub in Oxford Circus. Notable team captains have included James Acaster, Phil Wang and Ed Gamble amongst others.

In July 2017, Steve featured on an episode of gaming podcast That King Thing where he spoke about how Dara O Briain's Go 8 Bit came about, as well as some of his own experiences in gaming.

Following previous streams on Twitch with fellow Ginx TV host Chris Slight, Steve started his own channel on 17 October 2017. It became sufficiently successful for him to commit to streaming as an income source, and on 22 May 2018, McNeil fulfilled the requirements to become Twitch Partner. He was nominated in the UK eSports Awards 2018 for Streamer of the Year.

In March 2018, as a reward to supporters on Patreon, he began a new podcast called Let's Do A Gaming! where he talked about games and gaming with a guest on each episode from the worlds of video games or comedy.

In September 2018, it was announced that Steve had written his first book; on 19 April 2019 Hey! Listen!: A Journey Through the Golden Era of Video Games was released by the publishers Headline Publishing Group. The book focuses on the history of video games starting with the humble origins of games like Pong, through arcade cabinets and eventually home consoles, leading up to Sony's launch of the groundbreaking PlayStation. The book covers not only games but their developers, artists and writers who poured endless energy (whilst making some hilarious mistakes along the way) into satisfying a generational desire for new and unique, but also accessible, entertainment. Alongside his book release, Steve wrote several monthly gaming articles for Wireframe Magazine, which he still continues today.

After two and a half years of streaming on Twitch and YouTube, Steve did his final solo streams on the platforms on 12 August 2020 and 30 May 2020.

However, he did return briefly with WiFi Wars alongside his tech sidekick Rob Sedgebeer for a Captain Morgan themed version of the show called Who's the Captain Now? on YouTube in September and October that year which included guests going 1v1 against each other; and to Twitch on 31 December (2020) for a New Year's Eve edition of WiFi Wars called "#FU2020" to welcome in the new year with a variety of guests from comedy and gaming – in support of the Miscarriage Association and Alzhemier's Society, two charities which are very close to Steve & Rob's hearts and Deaf Rainbow UK, a charity whose BSL sign interpreters were seen throughout the show. The final amount raised was £3,225.33 (including gift aid).

In 2021, Steve worked with brands such as TikTok and Ubisoft as a Creative Consultant for his expertise in accessible, entertaining gaming content.

At TikTok, he helped produce their "Game Together" series which saw him liaison with stakeholders in multiple parts of the organisation/cross-functional teams to deliver a pilot series of engaging, entertaining gaming shows on their emerging live platform and advising on ways in which the live content ecosystem may wish to grow in the future. He also helped produce Ubisoft's YouTube series, gTV which was launching in the UK to help build on the success of their French and German iterations, whilst ensuring an authentic UK voice.

After a 9-month break, on 14 September 2021, Steve returned to Twitch again, but alongside King Rob with their regular WiFi Wars shows; Quiz Night, tabletop gaming show Game Over Board (with a guest) and The Video Game Game Show Show. They have since put all these shows on hiatus apart from WiFi Wars and Game Over Board. Monthly supporters of WiFi Wars on Patreon also get a first play of any news games which get added to the shows.

In April 2022, Steve hosted a weekly podcast called during Comics Made Easy, alongside Chris Slight, Alex Lolies (aka BoardgameYogi) & Javier Jarquin. Starting in late April 2022, the show aimed to help listeners get into the Marvel Comics and DC Comics Universes without it feeling overwhelming. After three episodes (including the pilot), Steve said during WiFi Wars' November 2022 Patreon stream, that the podcast would not return despite enjoying creating it.

On 30 May 2022, Steve & Rob hosted a special edition of WiFi Wars named WiFi War Child in aid of the War Child charity, raising funds to help children affected by the ongoing Russian invasion of Ukraine. The show included guests such as James Acaster, Scroobius Pip, Ashens and Mark Watson which lasted four hours and raised £4,479.31.

The following week, on 4 June, Steve hosted a pilot gameshow for The Yogscast gang called YogOff!, alongside regular WiFi Wars guest Alex Lolies (aka BoardgameYogi) co-hosting while Rob ran the WiFi Wars tech. The show seemed popular with the Yogscast regulars, Steve & Rob hope to make this a regular monthly show.

On 31 October, Steve deactivated his personal Twitter account along with Comics Made Easy and McNeil & Pamphlion's profiles. He remains active on WiFi Wars' account.

December 2022 saw Steve take on the role of Assistant Producer for Lost Voice Guy's Christmas Comedy Club special on ITV. He also helped write the script for the show. WiFi Wars also made their fourth appearance on The Royal Institution's Christmas Lectures, showcasing a "Super Recogniser" (created by Rob) to help identify faces of suspects in a criminal lineup.

== Filmography ==
Year	Title	Role	Notes
2005	Seconds From Disaster	Passenger	
2008	Comedy Cuts	Masked Man/Maurice	7 episodes
2009	Stockwell	Pat	TV movie documentary
2013	The Last of Us: Game of the Year	Contributor	Special
2014–2016	Console Yourself	Contributor	
2014	Games Evolved	Guest host	4 episodes
2014	The Quest	Guest host	4 episodes
2014–2016	Videogame Nation	Contributor/guest host	Filled in for Dan Maher for three episodes in 2016
2015	E3 2015 – Live!	Host	Special
2015	E3 Today, Tonight	Host	Series of specials
2015	Gamesport	Guest host	1 episode
2015	Ginx Live	Contributor	4 episodes
2015	Minecraft: Digging Deeper	Presenter	
2015	Players' Lounge	Host	Focused on Batman: Arkham Knight
2015	The First Hour	Guest host	
2015	Under the Radar	Guest host	9 episodes
2016–2018	Dara O Briain's Go 8 Bit	Co-creator and team captain	
2017	Go 8 Bit: DLC	Presenter	
2018–2019	Let's Do A Gaming!	Himself	Podcast
2022	Comics Made Easy	Himself	Podcast
2022	Lost Voice Guy's Christmas Comedy Club	Assistant Producer/Writer	
