= Nathan Caton =

English comedian (born 1984)

- Born: Nathan Junior Caton; 2 November 1984 (age 41); Hammersmith, London, England

Comedy career
- Years active: 2004–present
- Medium: Satire, stand-up, radio, television
- Website: http://www.nathancaton.com

Nathan Junior Caton (born 2 November 1984) is an English comedian.

== Early life ==
Caton was born in Hammersmith, London and raised in the West London town of Greenford. He has a younger brother who is accredited to some of Caton's early jokes. He went to Dormers Wells High School and subsequently Richmond upon Thames College which is where he became interested in comedy upon taking A Level Drama and continued the interest whilst an architecture student at Anglia Ruskin University. In 2005 he won the Chortle Student Comedian of the Year award. He was the first in his family to graduate from university but chose to pursue comedy full-time, much to his parents' initial disappointment. Caton is a Brentford fan.

== Career ==
Caton appeared on ITV's Comedy Cuts in 2007 after appearing at the Edinburgh Festival. In 2012, he did a tour called "Get Rich or Die Cryin'". He has also written for the children's series Rastamouse. Also in 2012, he wrote and appeared in the Radio Four series Can't Tell Nathan Caton Nothing, looking at his own life involving how he went into a career in comedy against his parents' wishes after his background in architecture. In July 2012, he appeared on the Radio Four programme The Now Show, on which he did a sketch referring to a news story about John Terry. He subsequently appeared again in March 2013 (mocking Justin Bieber's recent UK tour) and in October 2013. He has also appeared on Russell Howard's Good News and Mock the Week. In 2014, Nathan hosted Videogame Nation for Ginx TV on Challenge. Caton also wrote the CBeebies series JoJo and Gran Gran.
