= John Robertson (comedian) =

Australian stand-up comedian and writer (born 1985)

- Robertson in 2026
- Born: 12 June 1985 (age 41); Perth, Western Australia
- Notable work: The Dark Room; The Little Town Of Marrowville

Comedy career
- Years active: 2002–present
- Genres: Insult comedy, improvisational comedy
- Website: www.thejohnrobertson.com

John Robertson is a stand-up comedian, and author born in Perth, Western Australia.

== Career ==
=== Stand-up ===
Robertson began his stand-up career in 2002 at the age of 17. Upon moving to the United Kingdom, after developing his stand-up career, he debuted at the Edinburgh Fringe in 2010 with his solo show, A Nifty History of Evil. He has since performed at the Edinburgh Fringe every year since, often in parallel to his live-action video game stand-up show, The Dark Room.

Robertson's style of comedy can be described as insult comedy, with the majority of his set often being improvised, and targeted at the audience. He is also a Puppeteer and Ukulele player, and has incorporated these skills within his act.

Robertson has performed in venues as large as the National Exhibition Centre in Birmingham as part of the Insomnia Gaming Festival, and at the London Film and Comic Con and MCM London Comic Con. Robertson also performs at established comedy venues including The Stand Comedy Club, Gilded Balloon, and Komedia in Brighton.

=== Twitch streaming ===
Robertson began streaming improvised comedy content on Twitch on 20 January 2020. Initially streaming one night a week (as 'Monday Night Robbo'), this increased to multiple streams a week in April 2020, following the closure of UK comedy clubs due to a pandemic of COVID-19 in the UK, with streams covering both British and Australian time zones. Robertson's channel has over 10,000 followers as of August 2020 with over 200 viewers on average for his most popular Saturday evening stream.

=== The Dark Room ===
Robertson's main performing outside of his stand-up work is the point-and-click 'live-action video game' The Dark Room, a comedy show where the audience compete with Robertson, in his alter ego as 'The Guardian' of a virtual Dark Room resembling a 1980s text-based Interactive fiction Video game, which the audience tries to escape. Players are selected from the audience and are invited to choose between multiple options on screen to advance, and escape the initial room they awake to find themselves in.

Originally devised off-the-cuff as part of a set at an anime convention, the positive reception lead him to develop this into a full YouTube-based game, structured around individual videos linked together with clickable links embedded into the game. After going viral in 2012, and with over 4 million views, its success lead to its developed as a fully-fledged video game on the platform Steam.

The Dark Room has previously been intended to be developed for television as of 2018, however this has not yet been produced.

The Dark Room continues to make regular appearances at gaming events around the world, particularly at PAX in both Australia and the USA In 2026, it was announced that The Dark Room would debut in the US at Asylum NYC in November, and NPR included it as one of their "top picks" for Edinburgh Fringe shows that are coming to America.

=== Writing ===
Robertson's first children's book, The Little Town of Marrowville was published in 2019 by Penguin Books, and illustrated by Louis Ghibault. The idea of Robertson writing a children's book was suggested by an editor at Penguin who had enjoyed the Dark Room show.

Robertson has also written several articles on subjects ranging from video gaming, to children's book villains.

=== Television ===
Robertson first appeared on television in 2003 on Australian Idol, giving an over-the-top performance of Surfin' Bird by The Trashmen, which ended in him feigning a seizure to prank the judges.

His first professional television appearance was as a guest contributor on video game review show Videogame Nation from 2014, whereupon his positive reception (with Den of Geek describing him as 'the only reason to watch the show') lead him to become a full-time presenter, notable for his catchphrase 'hi-def, high-five!', that also ended the show's final episode in June 2016.

=== Video games ===
Further to his work in creating The Dark Room video game, Robertson has also acted as a comedy consultant for a number of AAA (video game industry) video game companies.

== Reception ==
In 2011, The Sunday Times Magazine wrote, "Robertson's charismatic, stream of consciousness, pop culture infused performances can veer assuredly between homicidal 20th century despots and, for example, a retooling of the Little Match Girl fable – she still dies, but because she's six years into a three year Communications degree, all is for the best."

The Age described Robertson's 2012 show Disturbing Stories for Disturbing Bedtime as "astute, amoral comedy for the morbidly inclined," saying that "his material – whether he's dissecting modern drama or advocating the murder of The Sound of Music's Maria Von Trapp – is edgy, intelligent, and smoothly delivered, though the appearance of a ukulele feels like a hangover from an earlier show, and a late moment of sentiment is a touch too contrived."

A 2017 review in The Plymouth Evening Herald admired Robertson's ability to steal an audience member's beer, and have the audience cheer him on.

In the 2021 Chortle Awards Robertson was named a 'Legend of Lockdown', citing his "remarkably prolific" Twitch streams and the almost £50,000 he had raised for charity over the year.

In 2025 the British Comedy Guide named John Robertson’s The Dark Room as the best-reviewed Edinburgh Fringe show of the year.

== Personal life ==
Robertson married fellow performer Jo Marsh (alias JoJo Bellini) in June 2013, and currently lives in London, United Kingdom.
