= The First Hour =

British TV show about video games

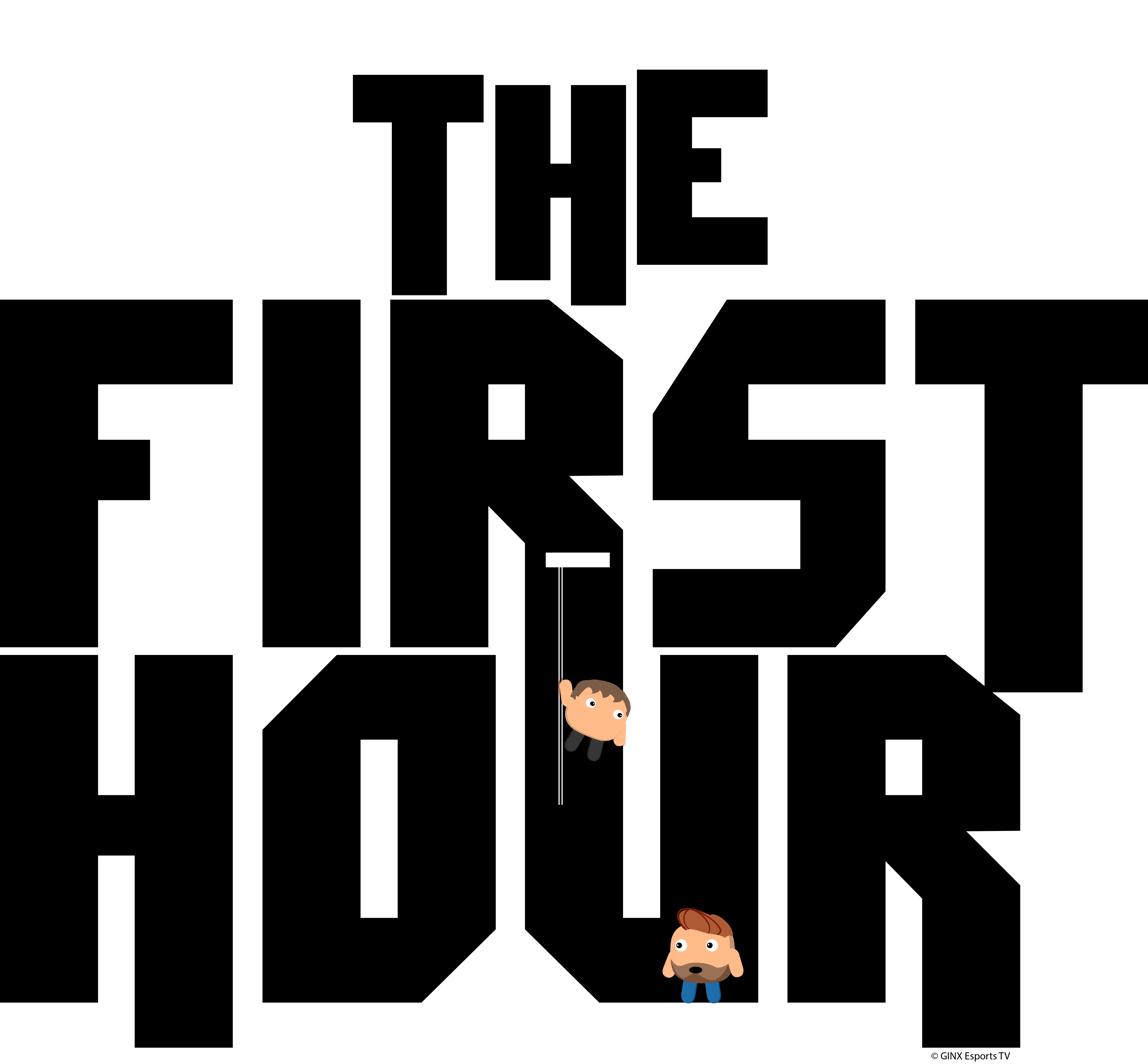
- Genre: Videogame review
- Directed by: GINX Esports TV
- Presented by: Adam Savage and Anthony Richardson
- Country of origin: United Kingdom
- No. of series: 14
- No. of episodes: 243

Production
- Producer: GINX Esports TV
- Editor: GINX Esports TV
- Running time: 60 minutes (inc. adverts)
- Production company: Ginx TV/Ginx Esports TV

Original release
- Network: Ginx TV/Ginx Esports TV
- Release: 1 November 2013 – present

The First Hour is a Ginx TV production which plays the first hour of a brand new game or a recent classic for the very first time. The main presenter has always been Adam Savage and has been joined by guests such as Lucy James and Neil Cole.

== History ==
A French version of the show started to film in November 2015 with original non-dubbed presenters.

The show was canceled on 11 April 2016 because its producers, Ginx TV, wanted to take the channel in a different direction. However, on 9 February 2017 it was confirmed via Ginx TV's Facebook page that the show would be back for a new series, starting 16 February 2017, with Adam Savage and Anthony Richardson returning as hosts of the show. The First Hour is currently in its 15th season.

== Episodes ==
The following is a list of episodes of The First Hour, Adam Savage appears in all episodes unless specifically stated otherwise. They are seasoned from the production company. Since episode 34, Anthony Richardson is an indefinite part of the show.

=== Classics ===
No.	Title	Guest	Original release date
1	"Assassin's Creed IV: Black Flag"	Simon Longden	1 November 2013
Avast me hearties! It's time to board the good ship Jackdaw with Captain Savage and Simon, the cabin boy as they set sell on the First Hour of Assassin's Creed IV: Black Flag.
2	"Battlefield 4"	Simon Longden	1 November 2013
The battle lines have been drawn and the first salvo comes from Battlefield 4. Will it be enough to topple Call of Duty from its top spot? Adam and Simon have one hour to find out.
3	"Call of Duty: Ghosts"	Simon Longden	8 November 2013
It's the game series that defined a generation of first person shooters. Has Activision created a new benchmark in gaming with Ghosts? Adam and Simon have one hour to find out.
4	"Lego Marvel Super Heroes"	Simon Longden	15 November 2013
It's finally here, Lego Marvel Super Heroes and Adam Savage cannot wait to experience the First Hour. Let's hope for Simon's sake that Lego Spider-Man is the only person that turns up to the show wearing spandex!
5	"Batman: Arkham Origins"	Simon Longden	6 December 2013
Adam Savage and Simon Longden take the reins of the Dark Knight as they battle for survival in Batman: Arkham Origins.
6	"Super Mario 3D World"	Simon Longden	13 December 2013
It's been a long wait but finally everyone's favourite Italian plumber is back on the Wii U: join Adam and Simon as they experience the First Hour of Super Mario 3D World!
7	"NBA 2K14"	Simon Longden	10 January 2014
Join Adam Savage as he graces us with his presence on the basketball courts of NBA 2K14.
8	"Far Cry 3"	Simon Longden	17 January 2014
9	"Assassin's Creed IV: Freedom Cry DLC"	Simon Longden	24 January 2014
Adam Savage and Simon Longden revisit the Caribbean and review the latest DLC episode of Assassin's Creed IV.
10	"Red Dead Redemption"	Simon Longden	31 January 2014
Join Adam and Simon as they hit the trail and venture into the Wild West reviewing the Rockstar classic Red Dead Redemption.
11	"Mass Effect"	Lucy James	7 February 2014
Adam is joined by Lucy James as they review the First Hour of their favourite sci-fi RPG classic, Mass Effect.
12	"Scribblenauts Unlimited"	Chris Bond	14 February 2014
Adam Savage presents another play through of the First Hour of Nintendo's kooky spelling adventure! It's more fun than it sounds ... honest!
13	"Titanfall"	Lucy James	14 March 2014
Adam is infamous for his poor kill:death ratio. Will Titanfall prove us all wrong and see Mr. Savage rise in the ranks of the illustrious warriors of this futuristic shooter? Probably not!
14	"InFamous: Second Son"	Lucy James	21 March 2014
Join Adam Savage as he controls slacker super powered Delsin Rowe and takes to the streets of Seattle in the First Hour of Infamous: Second Son.
15	"Dark Souls II"	Lucy James	4 April 2014
Adam Savage is crazy about Dark Souls. Quite literally! The first instalment of this modern classic sent him mad with frustration and will the First Hour of this follow-up prove one death too many for him?
16	"Lightning Returns: Final Fantasy XIII"	Lucy James	5 April 2014
Adam Savage considers wearing a pink wig and plays as Lightning in the fantasy world of Fabula Nova Cristallis.
17	"Lego The Hobbit"	Lucy James	11 April 2014
Nothing makes Adam Savage happier than playing a Lego videogame. Well, apart from playing a Lego videogame based on Tolkien's classic book, The Hobbit.
18	"Child of Light"	Lucy James	18 April 2014
Join Adam as he explores the sumptuous beauty of Ubisoft's side-scroller, Child of Light.
19	"Octodad: Dadliest Catch"	Lucy James	25 April 2014
Few First Hours are this chaotic. But what do you expect when you mix an Octopus pretending to be a human with Adam Savage pretending to be a gamer?
20	"The Amazing Spider-Man 2"	Lucy James	2 May 2014
Adam Savage dusts off his spandex and joins the Amazing Spider-Man for one hour of wall crawling, crime busting, skyscraper swinging fun.
21	"Sega Mega Drive Collection"	Lucy James	9 May 2014
Take a trip down Streets of Rage with Adam Savage for some Mega Drive nostalgia and a race with Sonic the Hedgehog.
22	"Watch Dogs"	John Robertson	18 July 2014
Anthony Richardson takes control of Aiden Pearce, the highly skilled hacker, who uses the connected infrastructure of a future Chicago to seek revenge for the death of his niece.
23	"Halo: Combat Evolved Anniversary"	Anthony Richardson	25 July 2014
Join Adam Savage as he explores the First Hour of the game that defined a generation of shooters, Halo:Combat Evolved.
24	"Uncharted 3: Drake's Deception"	Adam Mason	8 August 2014
Adam Savage fancies himself as the real life Nathan Drake, minus the charm, athleticism and ability to shoot his way through waves of treasure hunters.
25	"The Last of Us: Remastered"	Neil Cole	15 August 2014
Join Adam as he returns to the remastered version of Naughty Dog's modern classic, The Last of Us.
26	"InFamous: First Light"	Neil Cole	4 September 2014
Adam returns to Infamous but this time in control of Abigail Walker in the expansion pack, First Light.
27	"Metro Redux"	Simon Longden	11 September 2014
Join the Ginx team as they tentatively descend into the ruined Moscow subway for the First Hour of Metro: Last Light and Metro 2033.
28	"Hyrule Warriors"	Anthony Richardson	25 September 2014
What do you get if you mix the hack'n'slash of Dynasty Warriors and the magical world that spawned Zelda? One hour of sublime of non-stop action. But is Hyrule Warriors all that it promises? Join Adam Savage to find out.
29	"Destiny"	Simon Longden	2 October 2014
Join Adam Savage as he explores the First Hour of Bungie's genre-defining RPG shooter.
30	"FIFA 15"	Anthony Richardson	9 October 2014
The grudge match continues. Can Adam finally beat Ginx's reigning FIFA (International Federation of Association Football) champion, Anthony Richardson? Check out the First Hour to see who will claim the FIFA 15 prize.
31	"Disney Infinity 2.0"	Anthony Richardson	21 October 2014
Adam and Ant put Disney Infinity 2.0 and the Marvel Super Heroes through their paces for the First Hour of this new edition to the Disney videogaming franchise.
32	"Alien: Isolation"	Simon Longden	23 October 2014
Adam Savage attempts to survive the First Hour of Sega's space horror masterpiece, Alien: Isolation. Remember, "[no one] in space can hear you scream", although we are sure we will hear Adam in the studio.

=== Season 1 ===
As of Episode 33 (Middle-earth: Shadow of Mordor), Anthony Richardson is a permanent co-presenter.

No.	Title	Original release date
1	"Middle-earth: Shadow of Mordor"	30 October 2014
Join Adam Savage as he passes through The Black Gate and into the Shadow of Mordor to survive the First Hour of Orcs, Uruks and the worst villainy Middle Earth can throw at him. Guest: Anthony Richardson
2	"Sunset Overdrive"	6 November 2014
It's time for Adam to venture into Sunset City and take on the fiendish minions FizzCo in the First Hour of Insomniac Games' new franchise, Sunset Overdrive.
3	"Call of Duty: Advanced Warfare"	13 November 2014
Lock and load people, because Adam Savage is going in "all guns blazing" for the First Hour of Sledgehammer Games first foray into the Call of Duty franchise!
4	"Assassin's Creed: Unity"	20 November 2014
Adam Savage has to keep his wits about him as he explores Revolutionary Paris as Arno Dorian in Ubisoft's historical, action adventure game, Assassin's Creed Unity. Let's hope he keeps his head whilst everyone else around him are losing theirs.
5	"Far Cry 4"	27 November 2014
Adam Savage has one hour to get to grips with the fictional Himalayan kingdom of Kyrat, civil war, tyrannical despots, marauding elephants and Shangri-La ghost tigers. Yep, it's Far Cry 4 and it's going to be one hell of a ride!
6	"Lego Batman 3: Beyond Gotham"	4 December 2014
The caped crusader is back in this instalment from the award-winning Travellers Tales team and Adam Savage is all primed to take it for a spin.
7	"Dragon Age: Inquisition"	11 December 2014
Join Adam Savage as he takes the first tentative steps into Thedas in Bioware's epic RPG series.
8	"LittleBigPlanet 3"	18 December 2014
Both Adam and Sackboy have their friends over to play the First Hour of Little Big Planet 3.
9	"The Crew"	18 January 2015
Join Adam Savage and Anthony Richardson as they travel coast to coast across the United States in Ubisoft's open world racer, The Crew.
10	"Far Cry 4: Escape from Durgesh Prison DLC"	1 February 2015
Adam Savage has one hour to get to grips with the DLC from the blockbuster Far Cry: 4 game, including a civil war, tyrannical despots and one very welcoming prison.
11	"Lego Jurassic World"	21 June 2015
Ready to run? Adam Savage has one hour to tackle dinosaurs and adventures straight out from Lego's Jurassic World.
12	"Yoshi's Woolly World"	28 June 2015
Two grown men struggle to master a fluffy family game: join Adam and Ant as they have one hour to take on the colourful world of Yoshi's Woolly World on the Wii U.

=== After Dark: Season 1 ===
No.	Title	Original release date
34	"The Evil Within"	31 October 2014
Join Adam Savage and friends as he explores the pure terror of what looks to be the scariest title he's faced so far, The Evil Within. Guest: Simon Longden
43	"Grand Theft Auto V: Next Gen"	25 January 2015
Adam and Ant are back in Los Santos. Join them as they explore the crime-ridden city in all its full 1080p glory and experience the new first person playing style.
49	"Hotline Miami 2: Wrong Number"	13 March 2015
Get fired up with Adam and Ant in your new ultra-violent neon adventure, Hotline Miami 2: Wrong number.
53	"Grand Theft Auto Online: Heists DLC"	4 April 2015
Los Santos calls back Adam and Ant to check out the Heists Update for GTA V discover the multiple objectives system, new vehicles and weapons.
56	"Bloodborne"	18 April 2015
Adam and Ant Hack 'n Slash through the grim successor of Dark Soul II and check out how Bloodborne compares to its illustrious predecessor.
62	"Wolfenstein: The Old Blood"	16 May 2015
William "B.J." Blazkowicz and Adam Savage were meant to meet and leave a blazing trace – find out how our presenter will cope back in the brutal setting of the Second World War.
64	"The Witcher 3: Wild Hunt"	30 May 2015
Join Adam Savage as he takes arms and fights as Geralt of Rivia in the first hour of CD Projekt Red's epic fantasy game. Guest: Steve McNeil

=== Season 2 ===
No.	Title	Original release date
69	"Super Mario Maker"	5 October 2015
Adam and Ant are put to the test to see how they cope with a set of levels specially created in the playground of Super Mario Maker.
70	"Mad Max"	5 October 2015
Adam and Ant are cut loose on the post-apocalyptic world of Mad Max, just so we could see how much motorised mayhem they can cause in one hour. Expect utter car-nage.
71	"FIFA 16 vs. PES 16"	12 October 2015
Adam and Ant debate over which is better, FIFA or PES.
72	"Lego Dimensions"	19 October 2015
LEGO has come a long way since those bricks that you used to step on in the middle of the night: we've asked Adam and Ant to explore the all new dimensions this Warner Bros. title has to offer.
TBA	"Star Wars: Battlefront Beta"	22 October 2015
Special episode from Play Expo, Manchester.
73	"Uncharted Remastered"	26 October 2015
Adam and Ant embark on a quest for fortune and glory as they get to grips with the remastered version of Nathan Drake's very first Uncharted adventure.
74	"Silent Hills PT"	31 October 2015
Better set up camp behind the sofa, as Adam and Ant take on the Particularly Terrifying Playable Teaser of the cancelled Konami shocker.
75	"Skylanders: Superchargers"	2 November 2015
76	"Halo 5: Guardians"	9 November 2015
Adam and Ant review the new Microsoft game, Halo 5: Guardians
77	"Assassin's Creed Syndicate"	16 November 2015
Local residents, Adam and Ant, go back in time to take a tour of old London town and visit some of the city's most famous landmarks. And assassinate people, probably.
78	"Call of Duty: Black Ops III"	21 November 2015
Corporal Savage and Private Richardson head into a dystopian future to battle bad guys and zombies in the latest edition of the First-Person-Shooter series.
79	"WWE 2K16"	23 November 2015
80	"Rise of the Tomb Raider"	30 November 2015
81	"State of Decay: Remastered Edition"	12 December 2015
82	"Just Cause 3"	14 December 2015

=== Season 3 ===
No.	Title	Original release date
83	"Rocket League"	28 March 2016
Adam and Ant play car football, that's right, car football, in this already-classic Indie from Psyonix. Expect cheating and tantrums when Savage loses.
84	"Far Cry Primal"	28 March 2016
Our two favourite Neanderthals, Adam Savage and Anthony Richardson, grab their pointy sticks and try not to get stomped on by a mammoth in the latest addition to Ubisoft's Far Cry series.
85	"Plants vs. Zombies: Garden Warfare 2"	4 April 2016
Those age old nemeses, the Plants and the Zombies, go to war one more time in this third-person shooter from Electronic Arts (EA), and delicate flowers Adam and Ant find themselves caught right in the middle.
86	"Tom Clancy's The Division"	9 April 2016
Adam and Ant find themselves in mid-crisis Manhattan and proceed to blow stuff up in this third-person shooter from Ubisoft
87	"Indie Special"	11 April 2016
It's four games for the price of one in this Indie Special episode, as Adam and Ant get to grips with some of our favourite independent titles. Games featured are Action Henk, Goat Simulator, Kerbal Space Program and Keep Talking and Nobody Explodes.

=== Season 4 ===
As of April 2016, the show was effectively cancelled after the Ginx rebrand under the Esports banner, focusing on multiplayer arena shows. However, repeats of the Classics and After Dark series through the Autumn maintained Viewer interest and in January 2017, the show was announced to be returning with Adam & Anthony as hosts. In addition to Triple A releases that the duo missed while the show was in hiatus, the main focus has been on Multiplayer Arena Combat, Team vs Team games etc. The show currently airs Thursday at 8 pm with repeats at the weekend.

No.	Title	Original release date
88	"Overwatch"	16 February 2017
Blizzard Entertainment's now essential fourth franchise gets the long-awaited Adam and Ant treatment. Expect tears before bedtime over who wins and plays Tracer.
89	"Battlefield 1"	23 February 2017
Corporal Savage and Private Richardson discover that War truly IS Hell as they man their heavy artillery in the infamous conflicts of WW1 in EA Dices' latest instalment of the Online FPS Shooter.
90	"FIFA 17"	2 March 2017
It's a Clash of The Gaming Football Pundits as the Ex-Woodley United Player and YouTube icon face up in the ultimate showdown of silky ball skills and one-touch brilliance. Who will take the three points?
91	"Heroes of the Storm"	9 March 2017
In advance of the release of 2.0, its Blizzard Entertainment's second title in three weeks as Adam & Ant pick and choose their Blizzard character selection before Fight Club commences.
92	"Street Fighter V"	16 March 2017
Capcom's legendary Side Scroller Beat Em Up enlists two new students as Senseis Richardson & Savage learn the martial art of jumping about before applying the "One-Punch Fatality".
93	"The Legend of Zelda: Breath of the Wild"	23 March 2017
A towering achievement from Nintendo and considered one of the greatest video games of all time. No more needs to be said, but the challenge is to see if Adam and Anthony can draw breath instead of gawping at the beauty of it all.
94	"Titanfall 2"	6 April 2017
Its time to fill your Titan meter to the brim and deal out Ultimate Mecha Smackdowns as our Intrepid Militia Duo tries out EA & Respawns sequel to the 2014 Robot Rampage original.
95	"World of Tanks"	20 April 2017
Adam and Anthony cross the Gaming Iron Curtain in Belarusian-Cypriot Company Wargaming's long-standing Esports Multiplayer.
96	"Super Smash Bros"	29 April 2017
Its another instalment of your favourite Nintendo Crossover Fighting Sprees as the Ultimate Battle begins to see just who is the greatest arena survivor of all time – MegaMan or Pac-man.
97	"H1Z1: King of the Kill"	4 May 2017
Its Battle Royale time as Daybreak Game Company's Arena of Death welcomes Adam and Anthony – while placing side bets on just how long they will last.
98	"Call of Duty: Infinite Warfare"	11 May 2017
Activision's latest instalment of the COD saga sees Captains Richardson and Savage flung far into the distant future of combat before they grab their rigs and nip around in zero-g.
99	"Paragon"	25 May 2017
Epic Games's online battle arena gets the Adam and Ant treatment – with their home base at each end, who will take the core?
100	"Dota 2"	1 June 2017
It's a main event in the history of Ginx Esports TV – the 100th episode where two jokers get to mouth off about how brilliant they are at video games for around an hour! HOORAY! And to celebrate this truly momentous historical TV moment, Join your hosts Adam Savage and Ant Richardson as they delve into possibly the daddy of the Esports titles – Valve's DOTA 2, the staple of The International (Dota 2) held ever year in Seattle.
101	"Pokkén Tournament"	15 June 2017
It's the ultimate conflict of Cute vs Nasty (no, not Adam vs Ant) as the Tekken and Pokémon mash-up gets the First Hour coverage. Will our intrepid heroes manage to Catch Em All?
102	"Dishonored 2"	22 June 2017
Bethesda and Arkanes Superb Super-Stealthy Sequel has Adam and Anthony enlisted to the Karnaca City Watch and combining their Supernatural Abilities to take down some troublesome witches.
103	"Mass Effect: Andromeda"	27 July 2017
Five years after the troublesome conclusion to maybe the greatest gaming trilogy of all time, Mr Savage and Richardson tackle the lighter tone new entry and see whether they have the exploration skills necessary to become Ginx Esports TV's new Pathfinder.

=== Season 5 ===
The fifth season premiered on 31 August 2017.

No.	Title	Original release date
104	"Injustice 2"	31 August 2017
Is it a bird? Is it a plane? No, it's The First Hour. Ant and Sav are back to battle their way through Warner Bros' triple-A title and esports newcomer Injustice 2.
105	"Arms"	7 September 2017
The boys Ant and Sav are working up a sweat with Nintendo's new eSports fighter 'Arms' on the Nintendo Switch. Will they be armed and dangerous, or completely 'armless'?
106	"Shovel Knight"	14 September 2017
Ant and Sav are digging deep into Shovel Knight, a retro-styled 2D side-scrolling platformer that'll drive our dynamic duo up the wall.
107	"Vainglory"	21 September 2017
Vainglory is the free-to-play mobile esport on today's First Hour menu. The boys are once again out of their comfort zone, as its a MOBA and its on an iPad.
108	"Crash Bandicoot N. Sane Trilogy"	27 September 2017
He's enhanced, entranced and ready-to-dance, it's the return of Ant's favourite anthropomorphic marsupial, Crash Bandicoot.
109	"Crash Bandicoot N. Sane Trilogy"	5 October 2017
Sheathe your sword, and draw your deck. Ant and Sav navigate through Blizzard's free-to-play, fast paced online collectible card video game: Hearthstone. Smile and wave, boys.
110	"Mario Kart 8"	2 November 2017
New characters, new items, antigrav racing, ATVs, and loads more. It's time to see if Ant or Sav can race to victory with the latest in this classic long running series.
111	"Splatoon 2"	9 November 2017
Let's get sticky with some multiplayer, coloured inking, third-person splatooning. Ant and Sav send their Inklings to splattle, attempting to paint the Octarians black and blue.
112	"Yooka-Laylee"	16 November 2017
It's one dynamic duo against another as Ant and Sav take on Yooka and Laylee - the platforming protagonists from Playtonic's newest creation. Who will come out on top?
113	"Friday the 13th"	23 November 2017
Third-person horror awaits Ant and Sav. Will the boys survive as one of the unfortunate teen counsellors, or will they get very, very dark as Jason Voorhees himself?
114	"PlayerUnknown's Battleground"	30 November 2017
Ant and Sav parachute into this competitive multi-player, online battle royale survival shooter, developed/published by Bluehole. Kit to find, blue walls of death. How hard can it be?
115	"Tekken 7"	16 November 2017
Ant and Sav get personal with the 'beat em up' battles of the Mishima family. This legendary fighting game includes stunning story-driven cinematic battles and intense duels.
116	"FIFA 18"	30 November 2017
Teammates Ant and Sav have a digital kick about and tackle FIFA 18, the 25th instalment in the long-running series. Will it be goals galore, or a bore no score draw?
117	"Nadine Ross"	7 December 2017
Ant and Sav map out some uncharted action with open-ended gameplay as Chloe Frazer assisted by Nadine Ross and Sam Drake in India to uncover the Tusk of Ganesh.
118	"Marvel vs. Capcom: Infinite"	14 December 2017
Universes collide as Ant and Sav try to survive the fallout of this epic clash of heroes and villains from Marvel and Capcom: Infinite.
119	"Sonic Mania"	21 December 2017
Ant and Sav roll into the side-scrolling platform game "Sonic Mania," in which Sonic, Tails and Knuckles take on nemesis Doctor Eggman and his robotic henchmen, the Hard-Boiled Heavies.
120	"Cuphead"	31 December 2017
Ant and Sav run and gun with Cuphead, a game developed/published by StudioMDHR Ent. As Cuphead and Mugman, the two take on increasingly hard bosses in this playable cartoon.
121	"Mario + Rabbids Kingdom Battle"	4 January 2018
Ant and Sav play as Mario and friends fighting an invasion of Rabbids, who have misused a powerful invention that has brought chaos to the Mushroom Kingdom.
122	"Fortnite"	11 January 2018
Fortnite, the survival game developed by Epic Games Is making headlines. So of course our duo wanted to try it. Is the experience conclusive? Well, you tell us.
123	"Star Wars Battlefront II"	18 January 2018
Will Ant and Sav be good enough to use force in this famous action shooter? Or will they be tempted to join the dark side? Darth or Luke? Choices, choices.
124	"Call of Duty: WWII"	25 January 2018
Grab your rifle, soldier. Ant and Sav join the 1st Infantry Division in this first-person shooter. It's the fourteenth main instalment, so the boys have no excuses.
125	"Assassin's Creed Origins"	1 February 2018
Ant and Sav enter the animus and are transported back to ancient Egypt as they take control of the first Assassin, Bayek.
126	"Overcooked"	8 February 2018
There's trouble in the kitchen when Ant and Sav put on their chef hats and attempt to keep the customers happy throughout the first hour of Overcooked.
127	"Super Mario Odyssey"	15 October 2018
Ant and Sav join Mario on the Odyssey, his hat-shaped ship, in an effort to rescue Princess Peach from Bowser; triple-jumping and cap throwing awaits.

=== Season 6 ===
No.	Title	Original release date
128	"Dragon Ball FighterZ"	8 March 2018
Ant and Sav will need some training if they hope to be able to take down Goku, Vegeta, and the rest of the Z Fighters as they battle their way through the new 3v3 fighting game.
129	"Lego Marvel Super Heroes 2"	29 March 2018
Lego-Bricks, bricks and more bricks. Ant and Sav break, build and collect studs throughout the Marvel Universe as they try to take down the evil villain 'Kang the Conqueror'.
130	"Street Fighter V: Arcade Edition"	29 March 2018
The legendary fighting franchise returns and of course our infernal duo couldn't miss that occasion to fight. "The path to becoming a true martial artist never ends" as some say.
131	"Monster Hunter: World"	12 April 2018
Who you gonna call? Ant and Sav. They might be busy playing Monster Hunter though.
132	"Shadow of the Colossus"	19 April 2018
Armed with only their wits, a magical sword and a bow - Ant and Sav venture into the landscapes of Shadow of the Colossus. A thrilling mixture of exploration, fun and laugh.
133	"Dissidia Final Fantasy NT"	26 April 2018
Ant and Sav get to choose from over 20 iconic Final Fantasy characters and battle as they discover this fast-paced, strategic brawler.
134	"Metal Gear Survive"	3 May 2018
Multiplayers makes things far more fun. Statement 1. Multiplayer with Ant and Sav makes it impossible to resist. Statement 2. They will do their best, as usual, in this episode dedicated to Metal Gear Survive. Will they survive though? Watch and see.
135	"Sea of Thieves"	10 May 2018
Ant and Sav live the essential pirate experience as The First Hour takes a look at Sea of Thieves. From sailing to looting - your next 60 minutes promise to be fantastic.
136	"Scribblenauts Showdown"	17 May 2018
A marvel of puzzle game in the hands of two...well, marvellous gamers. What better way to spend your next 60 minutes? Ant and Sav very much enjoyed playing Scribblenauts Showdown and you will do so watching them play.
137	"Kirby Star Allies"	24 May 2018
The pink stuff is back. Ant and Sav spend 60 minutes trying to master it. Let's just say the result is probably not what you expected. Incredibly refreshing.
138	"Mutant Football League"	31 May 2018
Mutants, monsters and mayhem. Stuffed with humour, intense strategic online multi-player action, the boys unleash carnage on the pitch in this zany gore fest of arcade-style football.
139	"Owlboy"	7 June 2018
Two-dimensional pixel art and retro-sentimental platforming lift Ant and Sav to the troubled "land of the sky" as they fly along with "Owlboy" Otus, who can carry objects to throw at enemies.
140	"Far Cry 5"	14 June 2018
First Person Action-Adventure awaits as Ant and Sav head over to the open world of Hope County to battle charismatic preacher Joseph Seed and his cult: The Project at Eden's Gate.
141	"A Way Out"	21 June 2018
Join Ant and Sav as they try to escape prison in 'A Way Out', the intense split screen story-driven, co-op prison game from EA.
142	"God of War"	28 June 2018
Ant and Sav sharpen up the Leviathan Axe and take command of The God of War Kratos, with his son Atreus to hack-and-slash through the new land of Midgard - brimming full of Norse Gods.
143	"EA Sports UFC 3"	5 July 2018
Join Ant and Sav as they enter the octagon and see who has what it takes to be the UFC. With new fighters, new moves and an in-depth career mode, the boys will have their hands full.
144	"Extinction"	12 July 2018
The boys command a sentinel soldier named Avil battling endless waves of Ravenii; massive brutes with minions, across a sprawling countryside, defending cities and rescuing folk.
145	"Burnout Paradise Remastered"	19 July 2018
Ant and Sav get racing, burning rubber and shredding metal as they relive the high-octane stunts and wanton destruction within Paradise City - all while discovering jumps, stunts and shortcuts.

== See also ==
- Videogame Nation
