= Videogame Nation (TV programme) =

British entertainment television series

- Genre: Entertainment
- Directed by: Adam Mason
- Presented by: Tom Deacon (2014); Emily Hartridge (2014); Nathan Caton (2014); Aoife Wilson (2014–16); Dan Maher (2014–16); John Robertson (2014–16); Steve McNeil (2016)
- Theme music composer: Jeff Dale; Tim Reilly
- Opening theme: This Is Now
- Country of origin: United Kingdom
- No. of series: 4
- No. of episodes: 107

Production
- Executive producer: James Neal
- Editor: Luke Crockett
- Running time: 30 minutes (inc. adverts)
- Production company: Ginx TV

Original release
- Network: Challenge
- Release: 30 March 2014 – 11 June 2016

Related
- The First Hour

Videogame Nation is a British entertainment television series produced by Ginx TV, focusing on video games. It was broadcast on Challenge from 30 March 2014 to 11 June 2016.

== Background ==
It was originally presented by Tom Deacon (who was later replaced by Nathan Caton) and Emily Hartridge. The original version of the show was negatively received by viewers, so on 16 August 2014, it was completely revamped with new hosts Dan Maher (Explosive Alan), John Robertson (who first appeared as a guest) and Aoife Wilson (Eurogamer).

== Episodes ==
This is a list of Videogame Nation episodes, the first 20 episodes did not have a specific title or focus.

Series	Episodes	Originally released	
Series	Episodes	First released	Last released
1	40	30 March 2014	27 December 2014
2	20	14 February 2015	27 June 2015
3	25	4 July 2015	19 December 2015
4	22	16 January 2016	11 June 2016

=== Series 1 (2014) ===
No. overall	No. in series	Title	Original release date
1	1	TBA	30 March 2014
Videogame Nation takes an irreverent look at gaming culture: in this first episode, they indulge in a retro overview of Sonic the Hedgehog 2 and run down their Top 5 of the worst sidekicks in video games.
2	2	TBA	6 April 2014
A look at John Robertson's live interactive game and show The Dark Room, and the Top 5 worst power ups.
3	3	TBA	13 April 2014
A chat about Street Fighter IV with Ryan Heart, and the Top 5 least scary monsters.
4	4	TBA	20 April 2014
A Rayman Legends challenge, and the Top 5 worst player likenesses.
5	5	TBA	27 April 2014
The presenters take their sweet time with a Fighter Within challenge and talk about the Top 5 worst fighting games.
6	6	TBA	4 May 2014
They have a go on Kinect Sports Rivals, and check out the Top 5 worst motion-controlled games.
7	7	TBA	11 May 2014
In this episode, they get started on their Trials Fusion challenge and discover the Top 5 worst licensed movie games.
8	8	TBA	18 May 2014
They crack at a Bomberman challenge and count down the Top 5 worst wrestling games.
9	9	TBA	25 May 2014
They tackle a Mario Kart 8 challenge and snip at the Top 10 franchises that just need to die.
10	10	TBA	1 June 2014
An ultimate countdown of the Top 5 worst Xbox 360 and PlayStation 3 games, and they take on an NBA Jam challenge.
11	11	TBA	8 June 2014
Watch Dogs is under scrutiny this time, along with a look at the 10 worst Nintendo games.
12	12	TBA	15 June 2014
They give their opinion about the all guns blazing Wolfenstein: The New Order, and take a look at the 10 worst sports games in history.
13	13	TBA	22 June 2014
In this episode, there's a first look at Dark Souls II, and a countdown of the Top 5 games missing from E3 2014.
14	14	TBA	29 June 2014
A talk about eSports with Gfinity, and a countdown of the Top 10 indie games of 2014.
15	15	TBA	6 July 2014
Some of the best tips with eSports commentary training from Gfinity, and a selection of the Top 10 platformers of 2014.
16	16	TBA	13 July 2014
They talk about LittleBigPlanet 3 and pick their Top 10 consoles of all time in this episode.
17	17	TBA	20 July 2014
We learn more about Battlefield Hardline and the countdown of the Top 10 shooters you've never heard of.
18	18	TBA	27 July 2014
In this episode, we learn more about Dragon Age: Inquisition, and a countdown of Top 10 role playing games.
19	19	TBA	3 August 2014
A FIFA 14 challenge, and a countdown of the Top 10 sports games that aren't sports in this episode of Videogame Nation.
20	20	TBA	10 August 2014
Open world games is the theme of this episode as John delves into the roots and future of the genre, and discover the definitive Top 10.
21	21	"Titanfall"	16 August 2014
Titanfall is at the heart of this episode as Dan takes on Respawn's sci-fi shooter and John charts the history of the wall run.
22	22	"Dark Souls II"	23 August 2014
Dark Souls II gets the Videogame Nation treatment as Dan endures From Software's brutal adventure and John charts the history of survival in gaming.
23	23	"Watch Dogs"	30 August 2014
Watch Dogs is the game of the day on this episode as Ant jumps into Ubisoft's open world Chicago, whilst Dan checks out the game's unique hacking mechanic.
24	24	"Mario Kart 8"	6 September 2014
Mario Kart 8 is the game of the day in this episode as Dan drifts through Nintendo's premium kart racer, and then challenges the rest of the team to a round of multiplayer action.
25	25	"Minecraft"	13 September 2014
Minecraft is the game of the day as John takes on Mojang's indie blockbuster, whilst Dan visits London-based developer, State of Play to check out Lumino City.
26	26	"The Last of Us Remastered"	20 September 2014
The Last of Us Remastered is the game of the day as Aoife survives Naughty Dog's post-pandemic apocalypse, whilst Dan chats to Mike Bithell, the creator of Thomas Was Alone.
27	27	"Destiny"	27 September 2014
Destiny is the game of the day as Dan battles the hordes in Bungie's sci-fi epic, whilst John heads down to the arcade to check out classic co-op shooters, House of the Dead and Time Crisis 2.
28	28	"Hyrule Warriors"	4 October 2014
Hyrule Warriors is the game of the day as John dives into Nintendo's fusion of the Zelda and Dynasty Warriors series, whilst Dan checks out some of gaming's greatest spin-offs.
29	29	"Disney Infinity 2.0"	11 October 2014
Disney Infinity 2.0 is the game of the day as Aoife soars into Disney's super heroic epic, whilst Dan charts the rise of toybox gaming.
30	30	"FIFA"	18 October 2014
FIFA is the game of the day as Ant tackles his way through EA Sports' annual juggernaut, whilst John checks out some lesser known football games.
31	31	"Forza Horizon 2"	25 October 2014
Forza Horizon 2 is the game of the day as John take us through a journey into retro driving games, while Neil Cole sits back into a Mad Catz steering wheel to enjoy Forza Horizon's scenery.
32	32	"Alien: Isolation"	1 November 2014
Alien: Isolation is the game of the day as Aoife takes a look at The Creative Assembly's atmospheric horror game.
33	33	"Middle-earth: Shadow of Mordor"	8 November 2014
We dive into the Tolkien and Lord of the Rings world with Shadow of Mordor, the game of the day on Videogame Nation with Aoife and Dan, whilst John browses through previous games derived from franchises.
34	34	"The Evil Within"	15 November 2014
Dan and Aoife tinker around The Evil Within, the horror game of the day on Videogame Nation. After much comparing to Resident Evil 5, John explores the creative madness of Japanese developer Shinji Mikami.
35	35	"Bayonetta 2"	22 November 2014
Bayonetta 2 is the game of the day as Aoife admires the plastic, battle skills and attitude of the game's heroine, and we take a discerning look at female protagonists in games.
36	36	"Sunset Overdrive"	29 November 2014
Sunset Overdrive is the game of the day as Dan and Aoife use Xbox One's colour-soaked game world as a bouncy castle and explore what's so fun about funny games.
37	37	"Assassin's Creed Unity"	6 December 2014
Assassin's Creed: Unity is the game of the day from Paris as Aoife compares the real deal with its revolutionary in-game version, and John introduces us to the game's assassins in his wanted list.
38	38	"Games of 2014"	13 December 2014
Too many games and too little time? Check out the Videogame Nation's own selection of the top games of 2014. Did your favourites feature on the list?
39	39	"Trends of 2014"	20 December 2014
Too many games and too little time? Check out the Videogame Nation's own selection of the top gaming trends of 2014. Did your favourites feature on the list?
40	40	"Top 40 of 2014"	27 December 2014 & 28 December 2014
Videogame Nation's end-of-year countdown.

=== Series 2 (2015) ===
No. overall	No. in series	Title	Original release date
41	1	"The Legend of Zelda: Majora's Mask 3D"	14 February 2015
The Legend of Zelda: Majora’s Mask 3D takes centre stage on this episode, whilst John rates his top 5 time travel games and Aoife and Dan review the New Nintendo 3DS.
42	2	"Evolve"	21 February 2015
Co-op shooter Evolve takes centre stage on this episode as Dan, John and Aoife delve into its unique 4 vs. 1 multiplayer.
43	3	"Grim Fandango Remastered"	28 February 2015
Grim Fandango Remastered is in the spotlight this time, whilst the team check out gaming's top 5 re-releases and take a trip back to the golden era of adventure games.
44	4	"The Order: 1886"	7 March 2015
Steampunk third-person shooter The Order: 1886 is the top billing this time, and Dan, John and Aoife take a look at some of the new gaming franchises of 2015.
45	5	"Call of Duty: Advanced Warfare"	14 March 2015
Call of Duty: Advanced Warfare is in the sights this time as Dan, John and Aoife delve into what makes military shooters so popular and learn the unique charm of Exo Zombies.
46	6	"Never Alone"	21 March 2015
Touching independent game Never Alone takes centre stage on this episode as John waxes lyrical about games with a message and Aoife takes a look at Never Alone's cultural insights.
47	7	"Wrestling Games"	28 March 2015
Wrestling fans unite as Videogame Nation charts the history of wrestling in gaming. From TNA to WWE via nWo, John uncovers everything the genre has given to video games.
48	8	"Battlefield Hardline"	4 April 2015
Battlefield: Hardline steals centre stage as Dan, John, Aoife and the team check out gaming’s greatest heists.
49	9	"Game of Thrones"	11 April 2015
Telltale's take on Game of Thrones is in the spotlight as Dan, John, Aoife and the rest of the VGN team take a look at the popularity of episodic gaming.
50	10	"Bloodborne"	18 April 2015
Gothic adventure Bloodborne takes top billing as Dan, John, Aoife and the team get to grips with From Software's brutally hard game and crack the allure of the console exclusive.
51	11	"OlliOlli2: Welcome to Olliwood"	25 April 2015
Indie game sensation, OlliOlli grinds into view as Dan, John, Aoife and the team check out gaming's greatest skaters and wax lyrical on the extreme sports genre.
52	12	"Super Smash Bros. for Wii U"	2 May 2015
Nintendo's epic brawler, Super Smash Bros. for Wii U takes to the ring for this spectacular episode. The VGN industry experts deck it out over what makes the fighting genre so popular, and pit the team against each other in a Smash fight to the (virtual) death!
53	13	"Kickstarter"	9 May 2015
A look into the crazy world of Kickstarter to see what impact it has made on the games industry.
54	14	"League of Legends"	16 May 2015
The biggest game on the planet, League of Legends takes centre stage on as newbies Dan and Aoife find out what makes the game such a sensation, John counts down his top 5 games to play on Twitch, and the rest of the team chat their heads off about the world of eSports.
55	15	"Wolfenstein: The New Order and Wolfenstein: The Old Blood"	23 May 2015
Bonkers alternate history shooter, Wolfenstein: The New Order – and its mad add-on, The Old Blood are the centre of this episode, which sees Dan, John, Aoife and the VGN team delve into the history of the retro shooter and chart the evolution of the first person shooter.
56	16	"Splatoon"	30 May 2015
Chaotic, colourful shooter, Splatoon is in the sights on this episode as Dan, John, Aoife and the team take a look at Nintendo's first foray into the world of shoot-em-ups.
57	17	"The Witcher 3: Wild Hunt"	6 June 2015
Fantasy epic The Witcher 3: Wild Hunt is in the spotlight as Dan, John, Aoife and the team check out what could be one of this generation's defining open world games.
58	18	"E3"	13 June 2015
E3 2015 is just around the corner, so Dan and Aoife mull over their predictions for the show, whilst John counts down the top 5 most embarrassing conference moments.
59	19	"Uncharted"	20 June 2015
Sony's seminal action/adventure franchise, Uncharted takes top billing on this explosive episode as Dan, John, Aoife and the rest of the VGN team look at gaming's greatest action set-pieces.
60	20	"Grand Theft Auto"	27 June 2015
Rockstar's giant Grand Theft Auto franchise takes centre stage on Videogame Nation as Dan, John, Aoife and the VGN team look at its impact on gaming.

=== Series 3 (2015) ===
No. overall	No. in series	Title	Original release date
61	1	"Influential Games of the 1980s"	4 July 2015
Dan, Aoife, John and the VGN experts chart the 10 most influential titles of the 80's, a decade that saw the rise, fall and rise again of the games industry, and gave birth to some of gaming's most iconic mascots.
62	2	"Influential Games of the 1990s"	11 July 2015
Dan, Aoife, John and the VGN experts chart the 10 most influential games of the 90's, a decade that saw the birth of 3D, the creation of new genres and the rise of PlayStation.
63	3	"Influential Games of the 2000s"	18 July 2015
Dan, Aoife, John and the VGN experts chart the 10 most influential games of the 2000s, a decade that spanned three console generations, saw Microsoft enter the fray and gave us motion controls.
64	4	"Influential Games of the 2010s"	25 July 2015
Dan, Aoife, John and the VGN experts chart the 10 most influential games of the last 5 years: a period that’s seen the success of mobile gaming, given us huge, sprawling open worlds and the most powerful generation of consoles and PCs to date.
65	5	"Rare"	1 August 2015
British game developer, Rare take centre stage on this episode as Dan, Aoife, John and the VGN experts talk up their 30 years of game experience taking in everything from Goldeneye 007 to Battletoads via Banjo Kazooie.
66	6	"Lego Jurassic World"	8 August 2015
Mega franchise, Jurassic Park and its sequel Jurassic World get the Lego treatment on this episode as Dan, Aoife, John and the VGN panel talk dinosaurs, Spielberg and Lego games in equal measure.
67	7	"Batman: Arkham Knight"	15 August 2015
The caped crusader's gaming trilogy has come to an end in Batman Arkham Knight, which takes centre stage on this episode as Dan, John, Aoife and the VGN team chalk up Batman's success as a gaming protagonist and figure out the pitfalls for licensed superhero games.
68	8	"Gears of War: Ultimate Edition"	22 August 2015
Classic cover shooter, Gears of War and its remaster for the Xbox One, are in the sights on this episode as Dan, John, Aoife and the VGN team revisit the Microsoft exclusive and talk up the ups and downs of remasters.
69	9	"Everybody's Gone to the Rapture"	29 August 2015
First-person mystery, Everybody's Gone to the Rapture strides into view on this episode as Dan, John, Aoife and the VGN panel check out the experiential genre.
70	10	"Volume"	5 September 2015
Mike Bithell's stealth game, Volume, is in the spotlight on this episode as Dan, John, Aoife and the VGN panel talk up the allure of stealth in gaming.
71	11	"Super Mario Maker"	12 September 2015
As Mario turns 30 years old, Dan, John and Aoife celebrate the Italian plumber's gaming adventures with a challenge on the Nintendo mascot's latest game, Super Mario Maker.
72	12	"Metal Gear"	19 September 2015
Dan, John and Aoife check out what makes stealth series Metal Gear so enduring after all these years.
73	13	"Mad Max"	26 September 2015
Dan, John and Aoife discuss post-apocalyptic action-adventure game Mad Max before going head to head in the unique vehicle football game, Rocket League.
74	14	"Kerbal Space Program"	3 October 2015
Mad space simulator, Kerbal Space Program is the centre of this episode as Dan, John, Aoife and the VGN panel talk up gaming's greatest spaceships and race to be the first to get their rocket into space.
75	15	"Life Is Strange"	10 October 2015
Dan, John and Aoife discuss the episodic genre and take a look at the interactive drama Life Is Strange, a game that follows a young woman with the ability to rewind time.
76	16	"Lego Dimensions, Skylanders: SuperChargers and Disney Infinity 3.0"	17 October 2015
Dan, John and Aoife check out how Lego Dimensions is taking on Skylanders and Disney Infinity with a new toys-to-life game.
77	17	"James Bond"	24 October 2015
With James Bond's newest film Spectre hitting cinemas, Dan, John, Aoife and the team take a look at 007's contribution to gaming.
78	18	"Halloween Special"	31 October 2015
The team celebrate Halloween by charting the ten best horror games of all time. It's a genre with several classics to its name, but which one will come out on top?
79	19	"Rock Band 4 and Guitar Hero Live"	7 November 2015
The team is pitting old music game rivals Rock Band and Guitar Hero against each other for one final gig. But which one will win out?
80	20	"Halo"	14 November 2015
Microsoft's flagship shooter, Halo is in the spotlight in this episode, as Dan, John and Aoife delve into Master Chief's gaming history.
81	21	"Assassin's Creed"	21 November 2015
Dan, John and Aoife take a look at Assassin's Creed, the popular historical action-adventure open world game series.
82	22	"Fallout 4"	28 November 2015
With the release of Fallout 4, Dan, John and Aoife explore the vast wastelands of this popular open world action role-playing franchise.
83	23	"Rise of the Tomb Raider"	5 December 2015
Dan, John and Aoife chart the success of the Tomb Raider franchise as Lara Croft returns in the action-adventure video game sequel Rise of the Tomb Raider.
84	24	"Star Wars Battlefront"	12 December 2015
Dan, John and Aoife celebrate Star Wars' history in gaming before reviewing the 2015 shooter Star Wars Battlefront.
85	25	"Top 20 of 2015"	19 December 2015
With the release of Fallout 4, Metal Gear Solid V and The Witcher 3, 2015 has been an epic year for video games. The Videogame Nation team count down the top 20. What will be number one?

=== Series 4 (2016) ===
No. overall	No. in series	Title	Original release date
86	1	"Just Cause 3"	16 January 2016
Dan, John and Aoife check out what makes the open world genre tick with a look at the explosive action-adventure game Just Cause 3.
87	2	"Xenoblade Chronicles X"	23 January 2016
Dan, John and Aoife discuss the allure of the Japanese role-playing game with a look at Xenoblade Chronicles X on the Wii U.
88	3	"Resident Evil"	30 January 2016
The spotlight falls on the iconic Resident Evil franchise this week as Dan, John and Aoife take a look at what makes Capcom's survival horror series so popular.
89	4	"Gravity Rush"	6 February 2016
Dan, John and Aoife discuss the Playstation Vita action-adventure game Gravity Rush in a special look at the merits of handheld gaming.
90	5	"The Witness"	13 February 2016
Dan, John and Aoife take a look at the puzzle genre with a focus on The Witness.
91	6	"XCOM 2"	20 February 2016
Dan, John and Aoife explore the strategy genre with a special look at XCOM 2.
92	7	"Street Fighter V"	27 February 2016
Dan, John and Aoife chart the history of the fighting genre with a special look at Street Fighter V.
93	8	"The Legend of Zelda: Twilight Princess HD"	5 March 2016
Dan, John and Aoife celebrate The Legend of Zelda's 30th birthday and review Twilight Princess HD.
94	9	"Firewatch"	12 March 2016
Dan, John and Aoife discuss the first person adventure game Firewatch.
95	10	"Far Cry Primal"	19 March 2016
Aoife reviews the latest addition to the award-winning Far Cry franchise, the prehistoric-set Far Cry Primal.
96	11	"Plants vs. Zombies: Garden Warfare 2"	26 March 2016
The Videogame Nation team takes a look at the hilarious third person shooter, Plants vs. Zombies: Garden Warfare 2.
97	12	"Tom Clancy's The Division"	2 April 2016
Ubisoft's shooter The Division takes centre stage this week and Aoife and John take on Steve and Chris in this week's explosive challenge.
98	13	"Pokémon"	9 April 2016
Pokemon is 20 years old and Videogame Nation is celebrating with a special show charting the history of what is one of the most popular franchises of all time.
99	14	"Quantum Break"	16 April 2016
The team looks at the hotly anticipated time-manipulating third-person shooter Quantum Break before chatting about gaming's greatest time travel games.
100	15	"Dark Souls III"	23 April 2016
Dan, John and Aoife head to the Kingdom of Lothric to take a closer look at action role-playing game Dark Souls III.
101	16	"Sega Mega Drive"	30 April 2016
First up in a four-part series looking at some of gaming's most iconic consoles is the Sega Mega Drive – the console that gave us Sonic the Hedgehog.
102	17	"PlayStation"	7 May 2016
The team take a nostalgic look at the original PlayStation – the console that gave us Metal Gear Solid, Crash Bandicoot and Resident Evil.
103	18	"Nintendo 64"	14 May 2016
The team take a nostalgic look at the Nintendo 64 – the console that gave us GoldenEye 007, Super Mario 64 and The Legend of Zelda: Ocarina of Time.
104	19	"Xbox"	21 May 2016
The team take a nostalgic look at the original Xbox – the console that introduced us to Halo, Fable and Forza Motorsport.
105	20	"Uncharted 4: A Thief's End"	28 May 2016
Dan, John and Aoife discuss the merits of interactive storytelling as they take a look at one of the most hotly anticipated games of 2016: Uncharted 4: A Thief's End.
106	21	"Videogame Nation Challenge Special"	4 June 2016
Dan, John and Aoife compete in a series of gaming challenges to determine who is the greatest gamer on the Videogame Nation presenting team. Games featured are Donkey Kong, Mario Kart 64, Burnout Revenge, Grand Theft Auto V and Gang Beasts.
107	22	"Best of Videogame Nation"	11 June 2016
Dan, John and Aoife look back at some of the best moments from the series, from the greatest games to the daftest challenges.
