= Tom Deacon (comedian) =

British comedian, radio DJ and television presenter

- Born: Southampton, Hampshire, England
- Occupations: Comedian, radio presenter, television presenter

Thomas Holmes Deacon is a British comedian, radio DJ and television presenter.

Deacon attended Barton Peveril Sixth Form College in Eastleigh and went on to study Drama at Exeter University and graduated in 2007.

As a comedian, he has performed on many television programmes, including The Rob Brydon Show, Dave's One Night Stand and Edinburgh and Beyond on the Comedy Central channel.

He appeared on BBC Two's Winging It and presented The 5:19 Show for their youth-aimed 'Switch' programming on Saturday mornings.

Deacon began hosting the Sunday night slot on BBC Radio 1 from 7pm in March 2010 following the Chart Show, prior to the spring 2012 reshuffle. This slot was previously hosted by Annie Mac and Nick Grimshaw.

Deacon won the Chortle Student Comedian Of The Year award in 2007, appeared at the Edinburgh Fringe Festival in 2008 as part of the 'Comedy Zone' and made his Edinburgh solo debut at the 2009 Fringe Festival with his show Indecisive.

He returned to the festival in 2011 with solo show, Can I Be Honest?. In August 2012, Deacon debuted Tom Deacon: Deaconator.

In 2011, he was part of the judging panel for the Live & Unsigned national music competition.

Since the end of 2012, Deacon has featured on the YouTube channel Copa90 where he travels around Europe to watch and support many football games, the name he is given is the EuroFan.

From January 2013, Deacon presented a comedy show on Wednesday evenings as Matt Edmondson was moving to weekend mornings, leaving the station later in the year.

In 2014, he presented Videogame Nation for Ginx TV on Challenge.

In 2014/2015 he began presenting on a local radio station across Hampshire based in Southampton. He then joined Capital South Coast on 13 July 2015 to host the breakfast show with Emma Jo.
