= Ginx TV =

British gaming television channel

GINX.TV
- Native name: GINX TV Ltd
- Industry: Video game Industry; Esports; Entertainment
- Genre: Entertainment
- Founded: 2007
- Headquarters: London
- Area served: Worldwide
- Key people: Peter Einstein (CEO); James Wright (Website Editor)
- Services: TV channel; Gaming Website; Production company
- Owner: TV channel: ITV, Sky
- Website: www.ginx.tv

GINX TV Ltd, doing business as GINX.TV, is a United Kingdom–based media group founded in 2007 dedicated to coverage of video games–related content.

In addition to its television channel, which first launched in 2008, GINX TV produces and distributes content through its website and other platforms.

== History ==
=== Formation and launch ===
Ginx was founded in 2007 by Alistair Gosling (founder of the Extreme Sports Channel), Udi Shapira, and Cosmo Spens. The Ginx TV television channel would launch in August 2008 on Romania's Boom TV satellite television platform.

As of December 2012, Ginx TV operates in Southeast Asia, East Africa and Europe. Ginx TV is represented by the Dori Media Group in Indonesia and Turkey. A high-definition simulcast of the channel, called Ginx TV HD, was temporarily available on Hispasat 1E during 2011. On 30 July 2012, the channel became available in HD again on StarHub TV in Singapore.

In August 2010, Ginx TV announced plans to launch in the UK and Ireland, where the channel expected a potential audience of over 12 million viewers through Sky and Virgin Media. In October 2010, Red Bee Media was appointed to create a new identity and on-screen presentation for the channel.

The British launch was announced to be delayed in March 2011. Ginx TV would ultimately launch on Virgin Media on 9 July 2013. A video on demand service was also available in the UK on BT Vision from 26 May 2011.

Ginx TV programming has also been distributed to third-party broadcasters such as TVNZ U in New Zealand, Zee Trendz in India, OSN in the Middle East and North Africa and EGO in Israel.

On 12 December 2011, Ginx TV agreed to license some of its content to the American video gaming website The Escapist.

In April 2015, Ginx TV formed a temporary partnership with DStv to launch the first Esports channel in South Africa. The brand returned in 2017 through a partnership with SuperSport and DStv which would give it a dedicated channel. The channel was closed by 31 March 2024, with further content being available on Ginx+.

=== Shift to Esports ===
In June 2016, it was announced that, with the partnership of Sky and ITV, Ginx TV was to be relaunched as GINX Esports TV, shifting its focus to covering esports. With the changeover, the channel launched on 24 June 2016 on the Sky platform, in addition to it already being available to watch on Virgin Media.

On 15 February 2017, it was announced that the Canadian premium service Super Channel would launch a native version of Ginx as a replacement for one of its multiplex channels. Replacing Super Channel 4, GINX Esports TV Canada launched on 4 May 2017 with a live edition of The Bridge and thereafter combined its own domestic shows with the programming of its parent channel.

GINX Esports TV was launched in Israel in 2017 through a partnership with Partner's 4GTV app.

In October 2017, GINX Esports TV announced a partnership with Telekom Austria Group to make the channel available across Europe on Eutelsat 16A.

In October 2018, GINX Esports TV announced it had terminated its contract with Virgin Media.

In January 2022, GINX Esports TV began broadcasting its programming on Twitch.

On 24 June 2023, it was announced that the UK version of the channel would cease satellite broadcasts on 29 June 2023, and would continue on Sky Glass and Sky Stream.

On 17 July 2024, the channel launched as an IPTV service on Freeview on channel 296. It was later moved to channel 282 in August of the same year. However, just over 6 months after joining the platform, on 22 January 2025, the service closed on Freeview.

== GINX.TV programming ==
The company has produced several esports and gaming-related programmes for its television channel, website, and digital outlets through its production arm, GINX Studios. Ginx TV has also produced programming and content for third-party publishers, media organizations, brands and esports organizations.

=== Current programming ===
- The First Hour – Shows the latest big release or revisited a modern classic by playing through the first 60 minutes. Reintroduced in 2017. Presented by Adam Savage (2013–present), Neil Cole (2014), Simon Longden (2013–2014), Lucy James (2013–2014) and Anthony Richardson (2014–present).
- GINX Docs – Documentary style content covering an array of video game related topics, including the history of a game or the current state of a video game at present.
- GINX News – A daily gaming news show, presented by Ash Dixon.
- Origins – A look back at the origins of some of your favourite Esports titles.
- Shut Up & Play (ex. GINX Plays) – The cast and crew of Ginx Esports TV plays some of their favourite titles in this stream-on-TV format.
- Top 10 – Countdown of the Top 10 characters, games of a certain genre, etc. Presented by Adam Savage (2017–present).

=== Former programming ===
- 101 – Instructional show, demonstrating the high-level techniques used in a number of popular e-sports titles ("to go from being a newbie to a pro").x
- Action Figures Adventure Series – Reality show. Follows collector Jay Bartlett across North America as he attempts to build the ultimate action figure auction for charity.
- Ant & Sav vs The World – RL to FIFA or Street Fighter V, Ant and Save invite their viewers to join them in an exclusive competition.
- The Blurb – The channel's flagship show. It compiled the latest in gaming news, reviews, and previews. Presented by Julia Hardy (2011–2012), Anthony Richardson (2012), Lizzie Huang (2013), and Lucy James (2013–2014). The show was replaced by The Essentials in September 2014.
- The Bridge – Late night talk show. Multi-game coverage of live eSports (similar to sports channel live compilations of simultaneous matches). Hosted by Frank Soldato.
- Connector – The CS:GO Podcast – James Banks's interview podcast sees top CS:GO personalities give insights into the esports scene.
- Console Yourself – A show in which stand-up comedians confessed their videogame loves, hates, and guilty secrets. Presented by Neil Cole (2014–present).
- Crossfeed – Reality show/contest. Seeks the best influencers and streamers in the world over the prior two weeks.
- Culture Shock – Series dedicated to the culture surrounding video gaming including film, music and comic books.
- Daily Download – From the latest mercato news to the most recent merchandise launch, a light-hearted look at what's happening in the world of Esports and gaming with Emile Cole and Alex Knight.
- The Dojo – A deep dive into the world of the FGC (Fighting Game Community) led by Fighting Game players/casters Damascus and Tyrant.
- Faster – Games that focused on racing with a particular focus on motorsport. Presented by Neil Cole (2011–2014).
- Fight Card – Showcases games involving members of the "Ginx community".
- Game Set to Music – Gameplay footage from recent releases renowned for their graphical fidelity, at their maximum detail settings, synchronised with popular music.
- GameFace – Started broadcasting in 2009 on Bravo, before being replaced by The Blurb in 2011 on Challenge.
- Games Evolved – Tracked the history of a particular game or genre and comments on how different themes or ideas have been treated by different companies, series or decades.
- Games Games Games – Previews and reviews of games that are both child and family friendly.
- Games Room – Esports and streaming personalities face various games challenges that test their skill and reactions across a number of competitive titles, before being allowed to leave.
- Gamesport – Provided reviews and commentary on games within the sports genre. Presented by Anthony Richardson (2010–2014).
- Get Fragged – Followed the genre of first-person shooters.
- GGM (Good Games Monthly) – A monthly magazine show counting covering the world of Esports and casual gaming.
- Ginx Files – GameFace's sister show.
- Ginx Live – A live show fronted by Adam Savage with special guests, gameplay coverage and giveaways every week on Virgin Media, Twitch and later on YouTube. The news was presented by Chris Bond and Lydia Ellery while Chris Slight and Haplo Shaffer talked to the public and communicated their views.
- The Ginx Masterchart – A weekly top ten of chart games, counting down the biggest sellers of that week.
- Ginx News – A daily update of news within the gaming world. Presented by Lucy James (2013–2014).
- Ginx Playlist – A look at recommended games.
- The Ginx Top 40/10 Chart – A countdown of the biggest games of the week.
- The Ginx Vault – A look at retro games.
- HUD (Canadian) – Heads Up Daily TV. At the time, the first and only Esports TV show in Canada.
- IRL – Docu-reality series centered on the daily life of some the most notorious UK eSports personalities, presented by Charleyy.
- LetsPlay Live – Players from different teams compete to gain points to qualify into the OCE championship later that year.
- Minecraft: Digging Deeper – Teaches the basics of Minecraft and also more "advanced" and lesser-known Minecraft features with gameplay and narration. Explains from how to survive the first night all the way to how to dye wool, how to build a good home, how to use redstone well, etc.
- Most Wanted – Interviews and previews.
- Planet of the Apps – Previews, reviews and recommendations of mobile apps, games and gadgets. Presented by Adam Savage (2011–2015), Lucy Hedges (2014–2015) and David McClelland (2014–2015).
- The Quest – Focused on the genre of role-playing video games.
- Rumble Pack – A series of top ten countdowns that compared characters, genres and specific games.
- Social Gaming and Coconuts – Behind the scenes access to the world of social and casual gaming.
- SQUAD – Variety show covering gaming and internet culture.
- That "Gaming" Show – Covers recent stories from gaming, e-sports and entertainment. Hosted by Stumpie and Cole.
- This Week in Esports – Retrospective of the last seven days in Esports, hosted by former pro and Esports commentator F-Word.
- Under the Radar – A show introduced in June 2015 which focused on brand new and classic indie games, DLC and other games which may have gone under the radar.
- Videogame Nation – Only airing on Challenge in the UK, but on Ginx TV in other countries, each episode focused on one game, series or developer, with discussion of related titles and gaming history. In August 2014, the show was revamped with new hosts and a new format following criticism of the original version. Variously hosted by Tom Deacon (2014), Emily Hartridge (2014), Nathan Caton (2014), Aoife Wilson (2014–2016), Dan Maher (2014–2016) and John Robertson (2014–2016) with additional insight from 'talking heads' such as Steve McNeil and Chris Slight in the show's current format.
