= Robot Roller-Derby Disco Dodgeball =

2015 video game

- Developer: Erik Asmussen
- Engine: Unity
- Platforms: Microsoft Windows, OS X, Linux
- Release: 19 February 2015
- Modes: Single-player, multiplayer

Robot Roller-Derby Disco Dodgeball is an arcade arena dodgeball video game developed by Erik Asmussen. The game was released on 19 February 2015 for Windows, Mac, and Linux.

== Gameplay ==
In the game, players control a robot with one wheel from a first-person point-of-view. They can throw balls at other players to knock them out or score points and catch them to eliminate the thrower; more points can be earned through creative or skillful hits such as ricocheting the ball. Players can also deflect balls with the one they are currently holding. Movement in the game is dependent on the player's momentum, with travel continuing in a direction even if the player isn't holding a directional key.

The game has a Tron-like visual theme and a disco-themed soundtrack to match. It also has cosmetic items available for customizing the look of the player's robot. These items are tradeable for real currency on the Steam Workshop. The game has a number of different single and multiplayer modes where players can climb up the leaderboards while playing.

== Development ==
Robot Roller-Derby Disco Dodgeball was developed by Erik Asmussen starting in July 2013. He began with the game's movement mechanics, saying that he enjoyed playing with the skating-like movement before any other aspects of the game had been developed.

The game was in a beta phase of development on Steam Early Access for a time before being released fully on 19 February 2015. Asmussen said that the Early Access period was important for the game's development, as he received feedback from players tweaking and testing the game's settings. He plans to include more features in the future, including a level editor and local multiplayer.

== Reception ==
Josiah Renaudin of GameSpot gave the game a rating of 6/10, saying it was fun to play and commenting positively on the visual style as well as the number of game modes available. However, he said that he felt the game didn't provide much incentive for continuing to play and that it was hard to correctly predict a throw's trajectory. Thomas Ella of Hardcore Gamer rated the game 4/5, describing it as "one of the best, most fun, well-crafted multiplayer games available right now" but expressed disappointment at the low number of online players.
