= HUD (TV program) =

- Also known as: Heads Up Daily
- Genre: Video Games eSports; Entertainment
- Directed by: Blain Yetman
- Presented by: Marissa Roberto; Brody Moore; Camille Salazar Hadaway; Ajay Fry
- Country of origin: Canada
- Original language: English
- No. of seasons: 1
- No. of episodes: 250

Production
- Executive producers: Curt Marvis; Kyle Sonia; Carl-Edwin Michel
- Producers: Lisa Doan; Tyler Mason
- Production locations: Mississauga, Ontario
- Running time: 60 minutes
- Production companies: QYOU Media; ECG Productions; Northern Arena Productions

Original release
- Network: Super Channel; Ginx eSports TV Canada
- Release: January 15 – December 21, 2018

HUD, short for Heads Up Daily, was a daily Canadian television program that covered video games and e-sports. Produced by QYOU Media and ECG Productions, the program was hosted by Marissa Roberto and Brody Moore. The show aired on Super Channel and Ginx eSports TV Canada.

On January 11, 2019, the official Canadian Ginx Twitter account stated the series was on hiatus. The following March, Roberto later clarified that the show was no longer in production. The crew behind it have since launched Squad, a live-streamed show for Twitch and YouTube. In May 2019, QYOU confirmed that HUD had not been renewed for a second season. In July 2019, a 100-episode compilation of the series called Best of HUD began airing. A month later, Super Channel announced that Squad would start airing on Ginx on September 17, 2019.

== International broadcasts ==
The program was added to Instagram TV in July 2018. AXN Spin began airing the program across Eastern Europe in fall 2018.

Heads Up Daily was designed as a format to be licensed by partners globally for the production of localized versions.

== See also ==
- EP Daily - An earlier daily video game TV show co-hosted by Roberto.
