= Emily Hartridge =

English YouTuber and television presenter (1984–2019)

- Born: 25 May 1984; Hambledon, Hampshire, England
- Died: 12 July 2019 (aged 35); Battersea, London, England
- Occupations: YouTuber; television presenter

YouTube information
- Channel: emilyhart
- Years active: 2012–2019
- Subscribers: 346 thousand
- Views: 150 million
- Last updated: 3 May 2025

Emily Hartridge (25 May 1984 – 12 July 2019), also known as Emily Hart, was an English YouTuber and television presenter.

== Biography ==
Emily Hartridge was born in Hambledon, Hampshire, England in 1984.

Hartridge began publishing vlogs on her YouTube channel in 2012 with her "Ten Reasons Why ..." videos. Her material covered topics such as sex, relationships, love, gender and modern life, as well as pieces about her personal life such as her sexuality, mental health and her decision to freeze her eggs. She also presented television shows such as Channel 4's series Oh Sh*t I'm 30 and appeared in Sketch My Life.

== Death ==
On July 12, 2019, Hartridge was riding her electric scooter on the Queen's Circus roundabout in Battersea, London when she was struck by a lorry on the roundabout, killing her at the scene. She was 35 years old. Hartridge is believed to be the first person to die in the United Kingdom in an accident involving an e-scooter.

Hartridge's final video, titled "10 Reasons to Get a Younger Boyfriend", showed her receiving two scooters, given to her by Hazell following her 35th birthday in May 2019. One of the scooters was electric, believed to be the one she was riding at the time of her death.

In September 2020, a coroner ruled that Hartridge had lost control of her scooter due to it being "unsuitably driven, too fast and with an underinflated tyre".
