= Stuart Goldsmith =

Actor and stand-up comedian

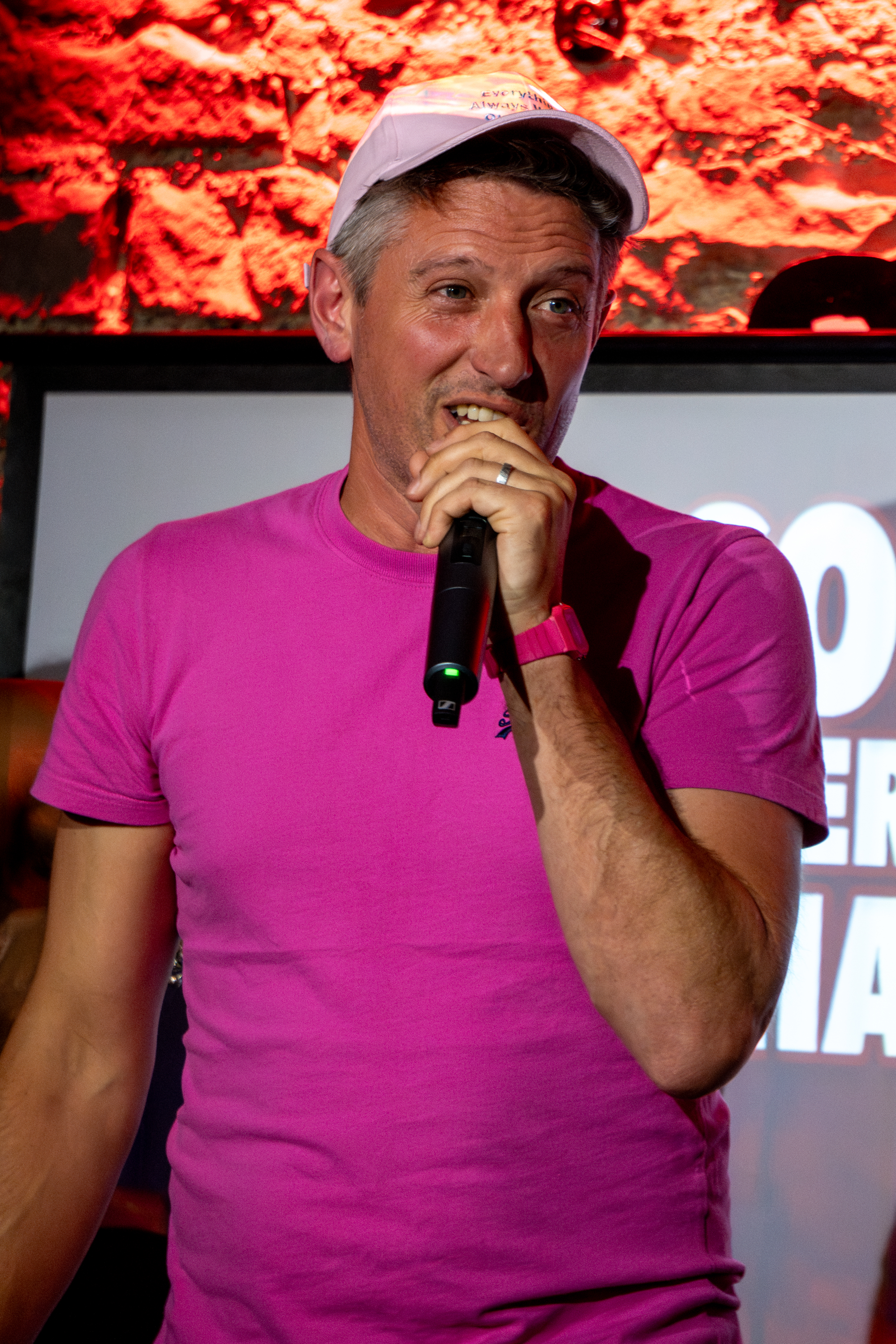
- Stuart Goldsmith, Edinburgh Festival Fringe, 2024
- Born: Bristol, England
- Occupations: Comedian, Podcaster, Actor
- Years active: 2009-present
- Website: www.comedianscomedian.com

Stuart Goldsmith is a British stand-up comedian and former street performer. He has presented the Comedian's Comedian podcast since 2012.

== Career ==
Goldsmith was born in Bristol and grew up in Leamington Spa. He trained at Circomedia circus school. He was a member of the Playbox Theatre Company youth theatre group in Warwick, and worked as a court jester at Warwick Castle.

He began in street theatre as a member of the comedy double act The Unknown Stuntmen with Noel Byrne, which won the Scottish National Busking Championships in 2001. He later performed under the name Beautiful Stu and "walked the tightrope eating a packet of crisps", winning the public vote in the Street Performance World Championship in 2008. On his street theatre work, he has said "If you can draw in the crowd at 9.45am in Covent Garden it teaches you to be funny."

Goldsmith was a 2005 finalist in So You Think You're Funny?, a 2006 finalist in Laughing Horse New Act of the Year, and came third in the Hackney Empire New Act of the Year. In 2007 he and co-writer Sam Hutchinson were finalists in the BBC's Witty and Twisted competition. In 2008 he formed the comedy double act Kiosk of Champions, with fellow stand-up Richard Sandling. In 2011 Goldsmith competed in the ITV reality show Show Me the Funny, where he was eliminated in week 6.

Goldsmith's 2010 Edinburgh show Stuart Goldsmith: The Reasonable Man received positive reviews, as did his follow-up 2011 tour Another Lovely Crisis. His 2012 Edinburgh show Prick was the subject of some controversy after the title was censored by the Edinburgh Fringe Guide. Goldsmith received generally positive reviews for his 2014 and 2015 Edinburgh shows, Extra Life, and An Hour, respectively. His 2016 Edinburgh show is Compared to What. He continues to perform stand-up at clubs and festivals, as well as at climate and sustainability public and private events.

In 2012 Goldsmith launched a podcast, The Comedian's Comedian with Stuart Goldsmith, where in each episode he interviews a comedian about how they approach their profession. Goldsmith uses insights from the podcast to give talks about personal resilience from the perspective of comedians. It published its 400th episode in April 2022.

== Television ==
Goldsmith played the role of Caleb in the 2010 CBBC sci-fi gameshow Mission: 2110. In 2016, Goldsmith appeared as a panellist on children's panel show The Dog Ate My Homework. He has also appeared as a guest on the Dave series As Yet Untitled with Alan Davies and has performed stand-up on Conan (TBS), Russell Howard's Comedy Central, and Live At The Apollo.
