= Iconicles =

Television series for children

- Genre: Pre-school
- Created by: Lois Lee; Eric Radomski
- Based on: An original idea by Lois Lee and Eric Radomski
- Directed by: Richard Bradley (Live-Action); Dino Athanassiou (CGI); Sam Cundall (2D)
- Starring: Gavin Stenhouse
- Voices of: Sam Lewis; Ellie Jayne Howick; Tim Dann; Helen Lederer; Toby Williams
- Theme music composer: John Greswell; Christopher Taylor
- Opening theme: Iconicles Theme
- Ending theme: Iconicles Theme (Instrumental)
- Composer: Lester Barnes
- Countries of origin: United Kingdom; United States
- Original language: English
- No. of seasons: 1
- No. of episodes: 26

Production
- Executive producers: For Iconicles Ltd.; Vanessa Chapman; Lucy Murphy; Christopher Keenan; For CBeebies; Kay Benbow; Jackie Edwards
- Producers: Alan Dewhurst (Series); Aron Evans (Animation)
- Running time: 25 minutes
- Production companies: Create Media Ventures (Iconicles Ltd.); phuuz entertainment; Foothill Entertainment; Dinamo Productions

Original release
- Network: CBeebies
- Release: 8 August – 10 October 2011

Iconicles is a children's television series. The series is a British-American co-production between Create Media Ventures (as "Iconicles Limited") and phuuz entertainment, in association with Foothill Entertainment and Dinamo Productions, and combines live-action, 2D and 3D animation.

== Plot ==
The series tells of a guy named Nat (Gavin Stenhouse) who invents an amazing display, the Iconi-Screen, that allows him to communicate with animated animals in various settings, such as a farm, the arctic, a jungle, and a garden. The animals are called "Iconicles". In every episode, Nat has a problem and is helped to solve it by an Iconicle, who jumps out of the Iconi-Screen to enter the real world and interact with Nat. At some point in every episode, there is a game with questions and answers based on what happened with some of the Iconicles.

== Characters ==
- Rumple (voiced by Toby Williams), a purple grumpy rhino who has a big heart for other Iconicles. He lives in the Wild Wilderness.
- Miss Moo (voiced by Helen Lederer), a green cow who has strict rules to keep everything tidy yet is very humble. She lives down on the farm.
- Splish and Splash (voiced by Sam Lewis and Ellie Jayne Howick), two blue and orange twin polar bear cubs who are curious and always want to have a lot of fun. They live in the Water's Edge.
- Skitter (voiced by Tim Dann), a red friendly squirrel who loves to collect acorns. He lives around the garden.

== Development ==
The show's development began as early as September 2005, and was announced to be in production by March 2006. when Foothill and Create Media Ventures announced development deals with Phuuz Entertainment for the production of the series.

In April 2007, CBeebies announced they had greenlit the series with plans for it to broadcast within a Fall 2008 delivery window. BBC Worldwide were also once involved in the production of the series.

The series never got past this window, and more information about the show was announced by CBeebies on 25 November 2008, with the intention of the series being broadcast within the 2009 schedule. Once again, the series never aired during this window.

In March 2010, Beyond Distribution acquired distribution rights to the series.

In May 2011, production of the series was announced to be almost complete. The series would premiere on CBeebies on 8 August 2011.

=== Broadcast ===
On 23 February 2012, Discovery Kids, TVOntario and Discovery Familia acquired the Latin American, Canadian and Hispanic American broadcast rights to the series.

== Episodes ==
No.	Title	Written by	Broadcast	Iconicles	Location	Prod. Code
1	Mungo's Tummy Trouble	Chris Parker; Samantha Hill	August 8, 2011	Splish and Splash	The Wild Wilderness	108
2	The Surprise	Carol Noble; Peter Hynes	August 9, 2011	Rumple	The Water's Edge	106
3	Dapper's Muddy Dilemma	Simon A. Brown; Denise Cassar	August 10, 2011	Splish and Splash	Down on the Farm	113
4	Zee Can Fix It	Simon A. Brown; Mark Holloway	August 11, 2011	Skitter	The Wild Wilderness	122
5	Lost and Found	Chris Trengrove; Mark Holloway	August 12, 2011	Rumple	Around the Garden	123
6	The Four Wonders	Simon A. Brown; Mark Holloway	August 15, 2011	Miss Moo	The Wild Wilderness	107
7	Dive, Dive, Dive	Carol Noble; Keith Brumpton	August 16, 2011	Skitter	The Water's Edge	105
8	The Pom Pom Tree	Simon A. Brown; Mark Holloway	August 17, 2011	Splish and Splash	The Wild Wilderness	109
9	My Ball Your Ball	Carol Noble; Siwan Jobbins	August 18, 2011	Miss Moo	The Water's Edge	101
10	Missing You	Adrian Mead; David Richard Fox	August 19, 2011	Skitter	The Water's Edge	126
11	Puddle Muddle	Chris Trengrove; Carol Noble	August 22, 2011	Rumple	Down on the Farm	119
12	Sleepover Showdown	Simon A. Brown	August 23, 2011	Skitter	The Wild Wilderness	102
13	Strictly Barn Yard	Chris Parker; Denise Cassar	August 24, 2011	Splish and Splash	Down on the Farm	111
14	If A Job's Worth Doing	Simon A. Brown; Jimmy Hibbert	August 25, 2011	Skitter	The Water's Edge	103
15	When It Comes To The Crunch	Simon A. Brown; Mark Holloway	August 26, 2011	Skitter	The Wild Wilderness	115
16	Whale Song Wrong	Simon A. Brown; Samantha Hill	August 29, 2011	Miss Moo	The Water's Edge	104
17	King For A Day	Keith Brumpton	August 30, 2011	Rumple	Around the Garden	116
18	Dapper Duck Messes Up	Adrian Mead; Samantha Hill	August 31, 2011	Rumple	Down on the Farm	114
19	Scotty's Bedtime Routine	Adrian Mead; Samantha Hill	September 1, 2011	Miss Moo	The Water's Edge	124
20	Show Time	Peter Hynes; James Mason	September 2, 2011	Splish and Splash	Around the Garden	112
21	The Whoo Wack	Simon A. Brown; Carol Noble	October 3, 2011	Splish and Splash	Down on the Farm	120
22	You And Me	Adrian Mead; Peter Hynes	October 4, 2011	Skitter	Down on the Farm	121
23	Don't Look Now	Denise Cassar; Mark Holloway	October 5, 2011	Miss Moo	Around the Garden	118
24	Elvis Has Left The Barnyard	Keith Brumpton; David Richard Fox	October 6, 2011	Splish and Splash	Down on the Farm	110
25	Shelly's Boot Camp	Simon A. Brown; Samantha Hill	October 7, 2011	Rumple	Around the Garden	125
26	Snow Time	Simon A. Brown; Keith Brumpton	October 10, 2011	Miss Moo	Around the Garden	117
