= Toby Williams =

Toby Williams may refer to:

- Toby Williams (American football)
- Toby Williams (comedian)
