= Comedy World Cup =

2012 British TV comedy panel game

- Genre: Comedy panel game
- Written by: Kevin Day; Gary Delaney; Phil Kerr; Shaun Pye; Christine Rose; Fraser Steele; Lee Stuart Evans; Dan Swimer; Martin Trenaman
- Directed by: Chris Howe; John McCormack
- Presented by: David Tennant
- Composer: Damian Coldwell
- Country of origin: United Kingdom
- Original language: English
- No. of series: 1
- No. of episodes: 7

Production
- Executive producers: Andrew Beint; Addison Cresswell
- Producer: David Ricketts
- Production location: Teddington Studios
- Editors: Steve Andrews; Del Shoebridge
- Running time: 60 minutes (inc. adverts)
- Production company: Open Mike Productions

Original release
- Network: Channel 4
- Release: 15 September – 27 October 2012

Comedy World Cup is a British television comedy panel game produced by Open Mike Productions for Channel 4. It was first broadcast on 15 September 2012 and last broadcast on 27 October 2012. The show is presented by David Tennant and features two teams of celebrities, consisting of a captain and two guests. In each episode the teams compete in seven rounds about British and American comedy. The show is a knock-out tournament with the winners of the first four episodes progressing into the semi-finals, and the winners of each of them compete in the final for the eponymous Comedy World Cup.

== Rounds ==
The following are the rounds in the order they are played during each episode (unless noted, they feature in all episodes):

- The Year In Question: Each team is shown television clips and have to work out the year they were first broadcast as well as identify the theme tune played throughout.
- The Young Ones (episodes 1–3, 5–7): A child performs a stand-up routine based on a comedian, the teams have to identify the comedian the child is imitating.
- Book Group (episode 4): 3 extracts from a well-known comedian's autobiography is read out, and the team is to identify the author, points are awarded as follow; 3 points for one extract read out, 2 for the second extract and 1 for all three extracts.
- In the Frame: Both teams are shown stills of comedy films with the actors' flesh removed. Once a team names the film they are then given a related question to answer.
- Sitcom Graveyard (episodes 1–3, 5 and 7): One team reads out three sitcom plots with only one of them being real, the other team has to work out which is real. In the final (episode 7), one team chose to answer a question on 'Mind Your Language' leaving the other team with this round.
- Mind Your Language: (episodes 4, 6 and 7) A clip of a British sitcom remade abroad is shown and the teams have to work out what sitcom it is. In the final (episode 7), one team chose to answer a question on this round leaving the other team with 'Sitcom Graveyard'.
- In the Spotlight: A member of each team is given one minute to answer quick-fire questions on a specific category.
- What Happens Next: A clip is shown to the teams and paused at a cliffhanger moment, the teams must say what follows on the clip.
- Quickfire Round: Tennant asks quick-fire questions for any panelist to buzz in and answer.

== Episodes ==
The winning team is indicated has their members in bold text
The team captains are listed in the middle of each team

No.	Team to host's right	Score	Team to host's left	Original release date
1	Shappi Khorsandi; Jo Brand; Dave Spikey	14–15	**Paul Chowdhry**; **Jason Manford**; **Nicholas Parsons**	15 September 2012
2	**Clive Anderson**; **Alan Carr**; **Sara Pascoe**	25–11	Stan Boardman; Micky Flanagan; Kevin Bridges	22 September 2012
3	Roisin Conaty; Phill Jupitus; Barry Cryer	14–26	**Mick Miller**; **Johnny Vegas**; **Josh Widdicombe**	29 September 2012
4	Jon Richardson; Andy Parsons; Chuckle Brothers	13–27	**Daniel Sloss**; **Omid Djalili**; **Joe Pasquale**	6 October 2012
**Semi-finals**
5	Clive Anderson; Alan Carr; Sara Pascoe	16–25	**Mick Miller**; **Johnny Vegas**; **Josh Widdicombe**	13 October 2012
6	**Paul Chowdhry**; **Jason Manford**; **Nicholas Parsons**	20–19	Daniel Sloss; Omid Djalili; Joe Pasquale	20 October 2012
**Final**
7	Paul Chowdhry; Jason Manford; Nicholas Parsons	20–21	**Mick Miller**; **Josh Widdicombe**; **Johnny Vegas** (Note: Originally Johnny was the team captain. During the recording Johnny swapped with Josh and the swap remained for the rest of the show.)	27 October 2012
