= The Russell Howard Hour =

Topical comedy news show, broadcast on Sky Max

- Also known as: Russell Howard's Home Time (2020)
- Genre: Topical comedy Stand-up comedy Satire
- Created by: Russell Howard
- Presented by: Russell Howard
- Theme music composer: Sergio Pizzorno
- Opening theme: "Ill Ray (The King)" by Kasabian
- Composer: Sam Gale
- Country of origin: United Kingdom
- Original language: English
- No. of series: 6 (+1 spin-off)
- No. of episodes: 86 (+9 spin-off)

Production
- Producers: Dan Atkinson; Jason Dawson; Robyn O'Brien
- Production locations: Studio TC1, Television Centre, London (2017–2022); Bath, Somerset (Home Time, 2020)
- Running time: 60 minutes (Regular, inc. adverts, series 1–5); 45 minutes (Regular, inc. adverts, series 6); 30 minutes (spin-off, inc. adverts)
- Production companies: Avalon Television; Sky Production Services

Original release
- Network: Sky One (series 1–4); Sky Max (series 5–6)
- Release: 21 September 2017 – 15 December 2022

Related
- Russell Howard's Good News

The Russell Howard Hour is a British topical comedy news television series that premiered on Sky One on 21 September 2017. The series is hosted by Russell Howard where he gives his thoughts and opinions on current topics as well as featuring special guests and other stand-up comedians. The show is in a similar style to his previous show, Russell Howard's Good News, which aired on BBC Three and then BBC Two from 2009 to 2015.

== Production ==
On 28 November 2017, it was announced that the show had been recommissioned for a second series, which began on 8 November 2018. Unlike the first series, the second series does not have a stand-up guest. Instead there is a segment titled "Live Forever" where Howard and another comedian test ways to live longer.

On 24 January 2019, it was announced that the show had been recommissioned for a third and fourth series. In Series 3, there was a segment called "Play Date" (which replaced "Live Forever") which showed Howard spending time with a celebrity.

In spring 2020, shortly after the end of series 3, the fourth series was revealed to be delayed until early Autumn that year due to the COVID-19 pandemic. As a result, Howard created a spin-off series called "Russell Howard's Home Time", featuring a similar format as the original show, except for a shorter 30-minute episode runtime. The programme was filmed at his home in Bath, Somerset due to social distancing measures, and began on 9 April 2020, running for 9 episodes.

The fourth series of The Russell Howard Hour began on 10 September 2020. Due to the COVID-19 pandemic, the first episode of the series did not have a live audience. From episode two onwards, a live audience returned, albeit split into socially distanced groups.

On 17 December 2020, it was announced that the show had been recommissioned for a fifth and sixth series.

On 8 September 2022, the first episode of the sixth series was originally going to air, but it got pulled off air following the news of Queen Elizabeth II's death that night. After 2 days of delay, the episode was finally broadcast on Sky Max.

With the closure of Sky One, the original channel for The Russell Howard Hour, it was announced that the series would move to Sky Max.

With the exception of the Home Time spin-off, all episodes of the programme have been recorded at Television Centre in London.

== Transmissions ==
| Series | Start date | End date | Episodes | Notes |
|---|---|---|---|---|
| 1 | 21 September 2017 | 21 December 2017 | 14 | |
| 2 | 8 November 2018 | 28 February 2019 | 14 | |
| 3 | 7 November 2019 | 27 February 2020 | 15 | |
| HT | 9 April 2020 | 7 May 2020 | 9 | |
| 4 | 10 September 2020 | 17 December 2020 | 15 | |
| 5 | 9 September 2021 | 30 December 2021 | 15 | |
| 6 | 10 September 2022* | 29 December 2022 | 15 | Series 6 was originally scheduled to premiere on 8 September 2022 but was pulled off of air, following the death of Elizabeth II. |

== Viewing figures ==
Episode viewing figures from BARB's Top 10 Programmes until September 2018 and the Four-screen Dashboard for September 2018 onwards.

=== Series 1 ===
| Episode no. | Airdate | 7 day viewers (millions) | 28 day viewers (millions) | Sky One weekly ranking | Multichannels rank | Guest | Stand-up comic |
|---|---|---|---|---|---|---|---|
| 1 | 21 September 2017 | 0.69 | 0.83 | 2 | 8 | Diane Abbott | Kiri Pritchard-McLean |
| 2 | 28 September 2017 | 0.70 | 0.82 | 2 | 14 | Adam Kay | Harry & Chris |
| 3 | 5 October 2017 | 0.65 | 0.72 | 3 | 18 | Greg Davies | Desiree Burch |
| 4 | 12 October 2017 | 0.62 | 0.73 | 3 | 25 | Richard Branson | Phil Ellis |
| 5 | 19 October 2017 | 0.64 | 0.69 | 4 | 23 | Fiona Bruce | Anna Mann |
| 6 | 26 October 2017 | 0.69 | 0.78 | 6 | 23 | Ed Sheeran | Rob Auton |
| 7 | 2 November 2017 | 0.63 | 0.75 | 5 | 24 | Daryl Davis | Harry & Chris |
| 8 | 9 November 2017 | 0.69 | 0.76 | 5 | 23 | Harry Leslie Smith | Paul Chowdhry |
| 9 | 16 November 2017 | 0.56 | 0.63 | 7 | —N/a | Naomi Klein | Mo Gilligan |
| 10 | 23 November 2017 | 0.58 | 0.68 | 3 | —N/a | Juan Mata | Julian Deane |
| 11 | 30 November 2017 | 0.47 | 0.57 | 8 | —N/a | Roisin Conaty | Fern Brady |
| 12 | 7 December 2017 | 0.58 | 0.65 | 6 | —N/a | Sarah Millican | Mae Martin |
| 13 | 14 December 2017 | 0.62 | 0.78 | 3 | —N/a | Jamie Oliver | Ed Gamble |
| 14 | 21 December 2017 | 0.59 | 0.75 | 4 | —N/a | John Oliver | Harry & Chris |

=== Series 2 ===
In series 2, the stand-up comic segment at the end of each episode was replaced with 'Live Forever.' In the segment, Howard and another comedian try an activity that is purported to improve health. Episode 7 was a Christmas Special.

| Episode no. | Airdate | 7 day viewers (millions) | 28 day viewers (millions) | Sky One weekly ranking | Guest | Live Forever |
|---|---|---|---|---|---|---|
| 1 | 8 November 2018 | 0.51 | 0.55 | 6 | Rukmini Callimachi | Pantsdrunk with Greg Davies |
| 2 | 15 November 2018 | 0.48 | 0.57 | 8 | Alesha Dixon | Chinese medicine with Jimmy Carr |
| 3 | 22 November 2018 | 0.29 | 0.41 | 8 | Louis Theroux | Dead bodies with Rose Matafeo |
| 4 | 29 November 2018 | 0.42 | 0.54 | 6 | Derren Brown | Cryotherapy with Paul Chowdhry |
| 5 | 6 December 2018 | 0.48 | 0.54 | 4 | Michelle Wolf | Ice baths with Paul Chowdhry |
| 6 | 13 December 2018 | 0.39 | 0.45 | 6 | Magid Magid | Shaman with Roisin Conaty |
| 7 | 20 December 2018 | 0.53 | 0.64 | 6 | Chris O'Dowd | Choir singing with Joe Wilkinson |
| 8 | 17 January 2019 | 0.40 | 0.46 | 7 | Rob Delaney | Bungee dance with Jessica Knappett |
| 9 | 24 January 2019 | 0.49 | 0.54 | 6 | Will Poulter | Cuddle therapy with Jon Richardson |
| 10 | 31 January 2019 | 0.40 | 0.46 | 9 | Mark Prince | Art therapy with Jo Brand |
| 11 | 7 February 2019 | 0.35 | 0.41 | 9 | Jon Ronson | Goat yoga with Mo Gilligan |
| 12 | 14 February 2019 | 0.35 | 0.43 | 7 | Stacey Dooley | Boxing with Joe Lycett |
| 13 | 21 February 2019 | 0.34 | 0.39 | 8 | Richard Curtis | Museum of Happiness with Lou Sanders |
| 14 | 28 February 2019 | 0.38 | 0.45 | 9 | Stephen Merchant | Ikigai with Iain Stirling and David Seaman |

=== Series 3 ===
In series 3, the 'Live Forever' segment was replaced with 'Play Date.' In the segment, Howard and another comedian try an activity that they have never done before.

| Episode no. | Airdate | 7 day viewers (millions) | 28 day viewers (millions) | Sky One weekly ranking | Guest | Play Date |
|---|---|---|---|---|---|---|
| 1 | 7 November 2019 | 0.54 | 0.59 | 2 | Ant Middleton | Beekeeping with Aisling Bea |
| 2 | 14 November 2019 | 0.47 | 0.51 | 2 | Tyson Fury | Flyboarding with Jon Richardson |
| 3 | 21 November 2019 | 0.35 | 0.43 | 4 | Sinéad Burke and Rapman | None (Note: There was no 'Play Date' in this episode. Instead, Burke and Rapman were interviewed separately, over two parts.) |
| 4 | 28 November 2019 | 0.52 | 0.59 | 1 | Kevin Smith | Going to a pub with Elizabeth Banks |
| 5 | 5 December 2019 | 0.41 | 0.46 | 1 | Carole Cadwalladr | Hot tugging with Tan France |
| 6 | 12 December 2019 | 0.38 | 0.42 | 3 | David Baddiel | A perfect night in with Jack Black |
| 7 | 19 December 2019 | 0.59 | 0.69 | 1 | Brian Cox | Trampolining with Emily Atack |
| 8 | 30 December 2019 | 0.35 | 0.37 | 5 | Best Bits of 2019 (Note: This was a special 2019 in review compilation episode. This episode features interviews clips with Stephen Merchant, Sinéad Burke, Tyson Fury, Rapman, Jon Ronson, and Kevin Smith; 'Live Forever' clips with Mo Gilligan and Jessica Knappett; and 'Play Date' clips with Jack Black, Aisling Bea, and Tan France.) | |
| 9 | 16 January 2020 | 0.30 | 0.34 | 13 | Jamali Maddix | Stunt school with Paul Chowdhry |
| 10 | 23 January 2020 | 0.30 | 0.33 | 10 | Iman Amrani and Seann Walsh | None (Note: There was no 'Play Date' in this episode. Instead, Amrani and Walsh were interviewed separately, over two parts.) |
| 11 | 30 January 2020 | 0.31 | 0.36 | 9 | Armando Iannucci and Michael Patrick | None (Note: There was no 'Play Date' in this episode. Instead, Iannucci and Patrick were interviewed separately, over two parts.) |
| 12 | 6 February 2020 | 0.38 | 0.42 | 8 | Guz Khan and Jim Carrey | None (Note: There was no 'Play Date' in this episode. Instead, Khan and Carrey were interviewed separately, with Carrey's interview being filmed on location, away from the studio.) |
| 13 | 13 February 2020 | 0.35 | 0.38 | 7 | Konnie Huq | Barging with Josh Widdicombe |
| 14 | 20 February 2020 | 0.36 | 0.41 | 9 | Eniola Aluko and Kerry Godliman | None (Note: There was no 'Play Date' in this episode. Instead, Aluko and Godliman were interviewed separately, over two parts.) |
| 15 | 27 February 2020 | 0.31 | 0.35 | 8 | Daisy Haggard | Driving down the A127 dual carriageway with Joe Wilkinson |

=== Russell Howard's Home Time ===
Due to the COVID-19 pandemic, series 4 was delayed until later in the year. This spin-off series filmed from Howard's home in Somerset features chats with celebrity guests, comedians and musical performances using Zoom. During the finale episode, Howard revealed that the regular show would return sometime in September 2020.

| Episode | Airdate (Note: Episodes on Sky One are shown on Tuesday and Thursday nights.) | Guests | Celebrity/musical guests | Musical performance |
|---|---|---|---|---|
| 1 | 9 April 2020 | Glen Walton | Greg Davies and James Bay | "Hold Back the River" |
| 2 | 14 April 2020 | Aoife Abbey | Jon Richardson and Gavin Osborn | "Born in the NHS" |
| 3 | 16 April 2020 | Ninette Howard | Michelle Wolf, Geraint Thomas and Lady Leshurr | "Quarantine Speech" |
| 4 | 21 April 2020 | Hassan Akkad | Jack Whitehall and Serge Pizzorno | "Lockdown" |
| 5 | 23 April 2020 | Caitlin Grant | Guz Khan and Harry & Chris | "Lockdown Life" |
| 6 | 28 April 2020 | Lucy Craig | Stephen Merchant and Tom Grennan | "Oh Please" |
| 7 | 30 April 2020 | Lisa King | Louis Theroux and Guvna B | "Fall On Me" |
| 8 | 5 May 2020 | N/A | Joe Gilgun, Katherine Ryan and Zuzu | "How It Feels" |
| 9 | 7 May 2020 | The Corona Arms | Marc Maron and Tom Walker | "Leave a Light On" |

=== Series 4 ===
On 7 May 2020, Howard revealed in his spin-off series finale that the fourth series of The Russell Howard Hour would return in September 2020. However, due to the ongoing pandemic situation, this will be the first series to have no audience and only a skeleton crew, due to social distancing requirements.

| Episode | Airdate | 7 day viewers (millions) | 28 day viewers (millions) | Sky One weekly ranking | Guests | Life Lessons (Note: Aisling Bea, Guz Khan, Jessica Brown Findlay, Iain Stirling, Phil Wang, Joe Wilkinson, London Hughes, Taylor Tomlinson & Paul Chowdhry share their life lessons regarding one given issue.) | Good Deeds |
|---|---|---|---|---|---|---|---|
| 1 | 10 September 2020 | 0.60 | 0.62 | 4 | John Oliver | I Wish I Was An Expert In... | Emdad Rahman, Book Bike London |
| 2 | 17 September 2020 | 0.44 | 0.52 | 5 | Lady Leshurr | The Phrase That Makes My Blood Boil | Imogen, 7 Million Keepie Uppie Challenge |
| 3 | 24 September 2020 | 0.42 | 0.46 | 5 | Elizabeth Day | My Sexual Awakening | Mike Trower, Cooking With Cody |
| 4 | 1 October 2020 | 0.37 | 0.45 | 6 | Kevin Bridges and Jessica Brown Findlay | The Childhood Memory That Just Won't Go Away | Grace Beards and Jodie Larsen, Paws & Pause |
| 5 | 8 October 2020 | 0.37 | 0.42 | 6 | Mo Gilligan and Slim | If I Could Communicate With Animals | Standup by Slim |
| 6 | 15 October 2020 | 0.43 | 0.57 | 4 | Greg Davies, Alex Horne and James Bay | My Weird Obsession | Ali Alzein, Bees And Refugees |
| 7 | 22 October 2020 | 0.26 | 0.40 | 4 | Rosie Jones | A Job I Secretly Think I'd Be Good At | Wesley Hamnett, Glasgow2Manchester |
| 8 | 29 October 2020 | 0.44 | 0.52 | 3 | Dizzee Rascal | My Irrational Fear | Mike Trower, Cooking With Cody |
| 9 | 5 November 2020 | 0.41 | 0.46 | 3 | Brian Blessed | An Award I Should Win That Doesn't Exist | Mark Humphries, Kidmenace Studios |
| 10 | 12 November 2020 | —N/a | —N/a | —N/a | Best of Guests | | |
| 11 | 19 November 2020 | 0.43 | 0.52 | 3 | Matthew McConaughey | My Worst Business Idea | Emma Walkerdine, Anger Van |
| 12 | 26 November 2020 | 0.39 | 0.49 | 3 | Tim Minchin | Here's Something That Should Have Been Taught In School... | Kaz Foncette, Wigs For Heroes |
| 13 | 3 December 2020 | 0.39 | —N/a | 3 | Richard Herring | Something I Would Make Illegal... | Carl Bradley, The Boot Room |
| 14 | 10 December 2020 | 0.40 | 0.42 | 3 | Jamie Redknapp, Matt Forde | I Would Love To Life Swap With... | David Ible & Sachin Rajkumarsingh, Aura Care |
| 15 | 17 December 2020 | 0.45 | 0.53 | 3 | Joel Dommett, Matt Lucas, Flo and Joan | My Favourite Christmas Memory Ever | (Note: Because of musical guests Flo and Joan no Good Deeds were shown.) |

=== Series 5 ===
| Episode | Airdate | 7 day viewers (millions) | 28 day viewers (millions) | Sky Max weekly ranking | Guests | Life Lessons | Good Deeds |
|---|---|---|---|---|---|---|---|
| 1 | 9 September 2021 | | | | Katie Piper, Aaron Simmonds, Iain Stirling | | |
| 2 | 16 September 2021 | | | | Robert Peston, Janine Harouni, Paul Chowdhry, Daniel Ricciardo | | |
| 3 | 23 September 2021 | | | | Tom Grennan, Paul Sinha | | |
| 4 | 30 September 2021 | | | | David Harewood, Joy Crookes, Lucy Beaumont | | |
| 5 | 7 October 2021 | | | | Sophie Willan, Andrew Bird, Andrew Steele | | |
| 6 | 14 October 2021 | | | | Billy Connolly, Everyone You Know, Isy Suttie | | |
| 7 | 21 October 2021 | | | | Edgar Wright, Steven Pinker, Fatiha El-Ghorri | | |
| 8 | 4 November 2021 | | | | Evanna Lynch, Joe Wilkinson, Jordan Brookes | | |
| 9 | 11 November 2021 | | | | Lou Sanders, Akala, Knucks, Kojey Radical, Swindle | | |
| 10 | 18 November 2021 | | | | Susie Dent, Paul Merson, Harriet Dyer | | |
| 11 | 25 November 2021 | | | | Gabby Logan, Jimmy Carr, Jacob Hawley | | |
| 12 | 2 December 2021 | | | | Jordan Peterson, Guz Khan, Self Esteem | | |
| 13 | 9 December 2021 | | | | Steven Bartlett, Josh Widdicombe, Cat Burns | | |
| 14 | 16 December 2021 | | | | Keanu Reeves, Carrie-Anne Moss, Fred Sireix, Flo & Joan | | |

=== Series 6 ===
| Episode | Airdate | 7 day viewers (millions) | 28 day viewers (millions) | Sky Max weekly ranking | Guests | Life Lessons | Good Deeds |
|---|---|---|---|---|---|---|---|
| 1 | 10 September 2022 | | | | Jamali Maddix | | |
| 2 | 22 September 2022 | | | | Fern Brady | | |
| 3 | 29 September 2022 | | | | Paul Chowdhry | | |
| 4 | 6 October 2022 | | | | Maisie Adam | | |
| 5 | 13 October 2022 | | | | Michelle Wolf | | |
| 6 | 20 October 2022 | | | | Troye Hawke | | |
| 7 | 3 November 2022 | | | | Greta Thunberg | | |
| 8 | 10 November 2022 | | | | Kiri Pritchard-McLean | | |
| 9 | 17 November 2022 | | | | Glenn Moore | | |
| 10 | 24 November 2022 | | | | Jordan Gray | Shad Chefs Man Hub | |
| 11 | 1 December 2022 | | | | London Hughes | | |
| 12 | 8 December 2022 | | | | Sam Campbell | | |
| 13 | 15 December 2022 | | | | Garth Marenghi | | |
