= Tim Dann =

British actor and voice-over artist

Timothy Dann is a British voice-over artist, actor and writer. He is best known for his voice work on CITV, CBBC the comedy shows Hedz & OOglies. He also co-created and wrote OOglies with fellow writers Nick Hopkin & Austin Low. In 2009, he also provided the voice of the Total Intelligence Mechanism in the CBBC series Wait For It..!.
