= Eddie Kadi =

British comedian (born 1983)

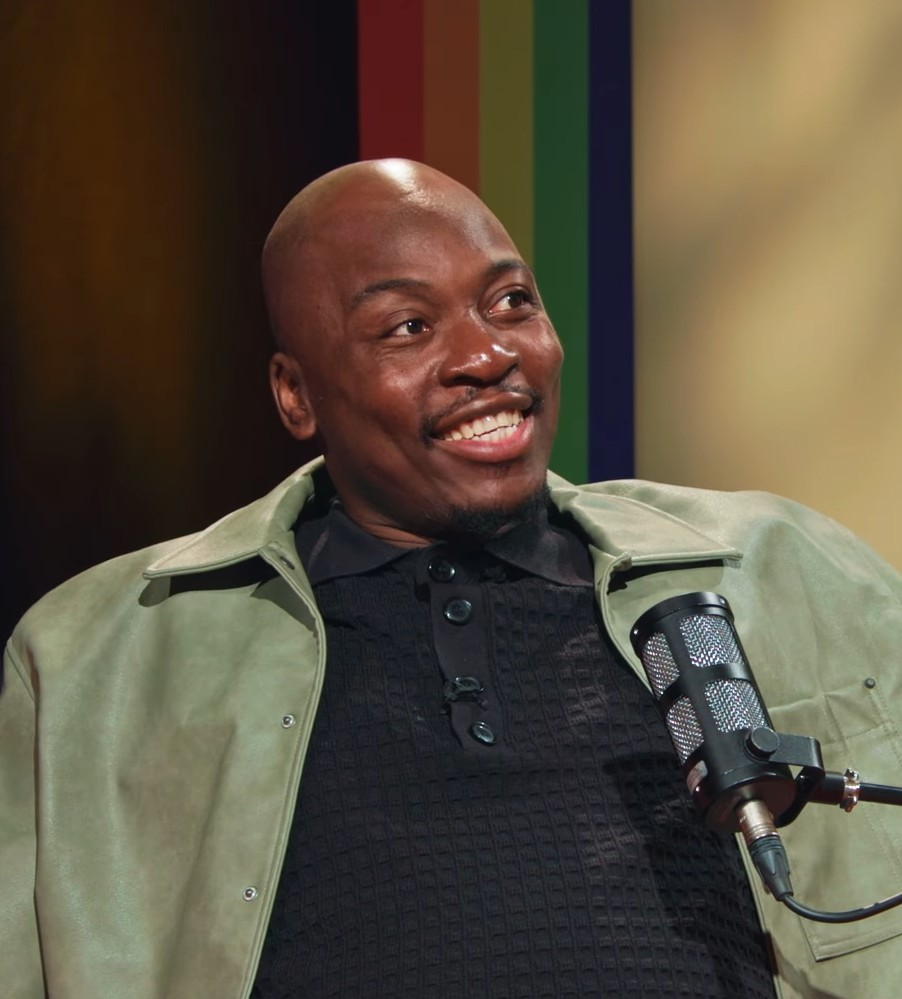
- Kadi in 2026
- Born: 18 May 1983 (age 43); Kinshasa, Zaire
- Education: Kingston University
- Website: eddiekadi.com

Eddie Kadi (born 18 May 1983) is a Congolese-born British comedian, presenter and actor.

== Early life ==
A resident of South-West London since 1992, he is a past student of Fulham Primary School, Henry Compton Secondary School, William Morris Academy and Kingston University from which he graduated with BSc Honours in Media Technology. Kadi served as President of the Afro-Caribbean Society at the University.

== Career ==
=== Comedy ===
Kadi won the BECA Award for Best Comedy Newcomer In 2006. He was the first Black British solo comedian to sell out London's IndigO2 – two of those during 2009. In September 2010, he performed at London's O2 Arena. He has since made appearances around the world including The Joburg Comedy festival, Africa Laughs in Uganda, night of a thousand laughs in Ghana, as well the AMVCAs broadcast across all 54 states in Africa live from Nigeria.

Kadi joined the American hip-hop star Lauryn Hill at Radio City Music Hall in New York City performing stand-up comedy in 2017 followed with Hill and Nas on their Powernomics tour in the US, performing stand-up comedy across various states.

=== Television and radio ===
Kadi is a presenter on BBC Radio 1Xtra on the Official UK Afrobeats Charts Show, and appeared as team captain on series 3 of ITV’s comedy panel show Sorry, I Didn't Know. He is a regular contributor on BBC Radio 5 Live's sports comedy panel show Fighting Talk. He also co-hosted Amazon Music +44 Podcast The Noughties alongside Nadia Jae.

In 2023, Kadi competed in the twenty-first series of Strictly Come Dancing, partnering with professional dancer Karen Hauer. They were the fourth couple to be eliminated from the competition. In November 2025, Kadi was announced as a contestant on the twenty-fifth series of I'm a Celebrity...Get Me Out of Here!. He was the second voted out on 30 November, finishing in 11th place.

=== Acting ===
Kadi's work as a voiceover artist includes a characterisation in the Tiger-Aspect-produced animated TV series Tinga Tinga Tales.

His film projects include the lead role in the short film Area Boys (2007), shot in Africa (Lagos, Nigeria) and premiered at the 51st London Film Festival. He also appears as Reggy in Shank (2010); the parking attendant, Tunde, in Anuvahood (2011); and the Radio DJ in Gone Too Far! (2013).

=== Music ===
Kadi has also featured vocally alongside UK Hip Hop Artist Sway and was invited to Senegal in 2008 to host the inauguration of the Senegalese rap artist Akon on his "Konfidence Foundation".
