= Paul Chowdhry =

British comedian and actor (born 1974)

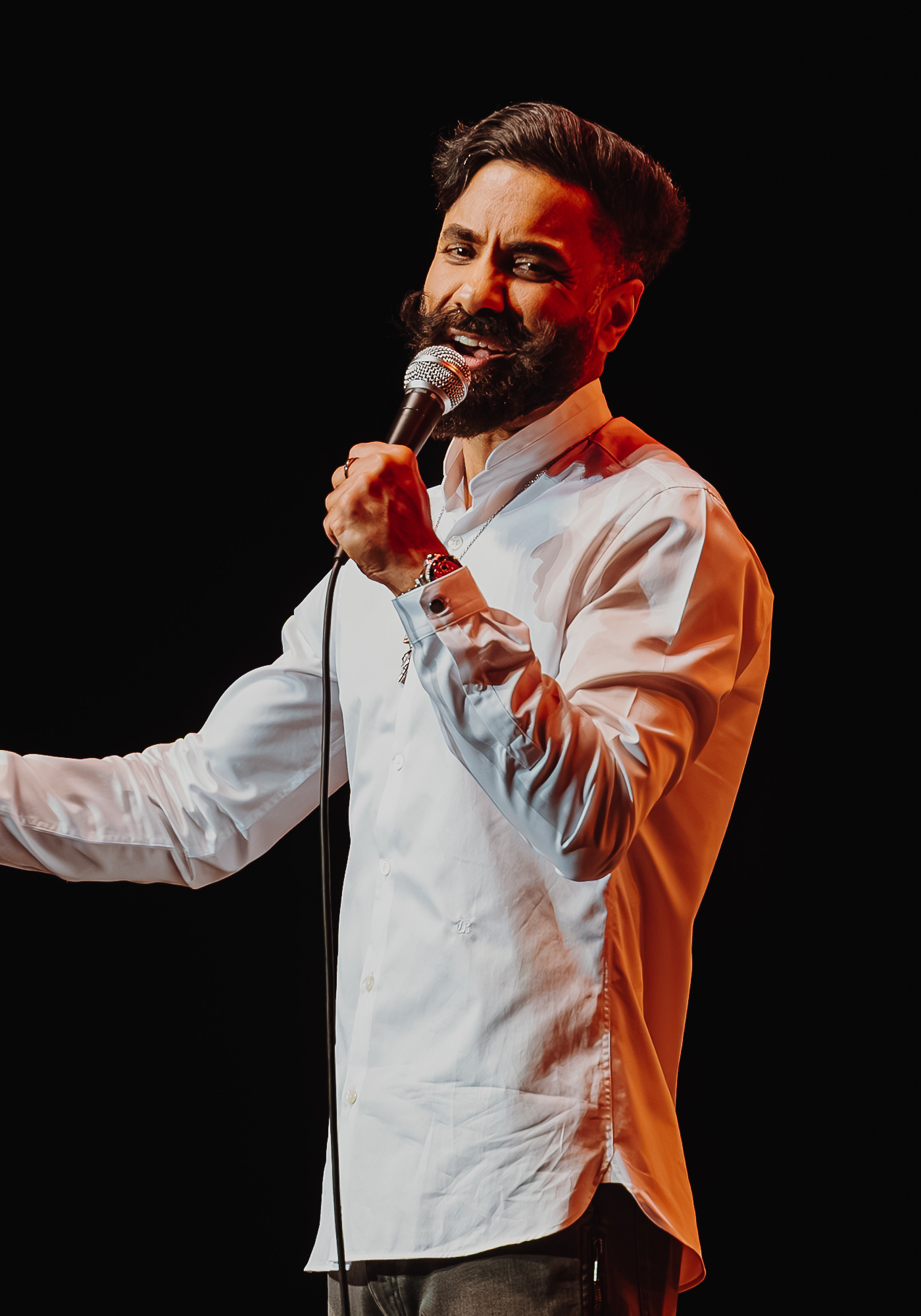
- Chowdhry in 2025
- Born: Tajpaul Singh Chowdhry; 21 August 1974 (age 52); London, England
- Relatives: Navin Chowdhry (cousin)

Comedy career
- Years active: 1998–present
- Medium: Stand-up; television; film; podcast
- Genres: Satire; social commentary; character comedy; observational comedy; crowd work; improvisational comedy
- Website: paulchowdhry.com

Tajpaul Singh Chowdhry (born 21 August 1974), better known as Paul Chowdhry, is a British comedian and actor.

Chowdhry has made numerous appearances on television comedy shows including hosting Stand Up for the Week, and he twice headlined Live at the Apollo, in 2012 and 2015. In 2016, he competed on Taskmaster alongside Dave Gorman, Sara Pascoe, Al Murray and Rob Beckett. In 2017, Chowdhry became the first comedian of Asian heritage to sell out Wembley Arena. He has released four stand-up comedy specials, What's Happening White People through Universal Pictures in 2012 and later broadcast on Channel 4, PC's World released on DVD through Universal Pictures in 2015, Live Innit on Amazon Prime Video in 2019 and later shown on Comedy Central, and Family-Friendly Comedian on Sky UK in 2024.

He has performed six tours across the world – Not PC (2010), What's Happening White People? (2012), PC's World (2014), Live Innit? (2017), Family Friendly Comedian (2022), and Englandia, which debuted in 2025.

== Early life ==
Tajpaul Singh Chowdhry was born on 21 August 1974 in Edgware, a suburban town in northwest London. He is of Indian Punjabi descent. His father had emigrated to Southampton in 1964 and worked as a bus conductor before buying a newsagent and sandwich shop. His mother passed away when he was five years old.

As a child, he grew up watching a lot of stand-up comedy including American and British acts such as The Morecambe & Wise Show, Benny Hill, and Bruce Forsyth. His weekends were spent visiting a temple with his cousins and other relatives who enjoyed eating Indian food together. He attended The Harrodian School in Barnes.

== Career ==
Chowdhry has received numerous awards, including the Comedy award at the Eastern Eye Arts, Culture & Theatre Awards 2019, Comedian of the Year award at the Asian Voice Political & Public Life Awards 2019, and he was nominated for Entertainer of the Year by the British Asian Awards 2019. His show Live Innit? won Best Live Event 2018 at the ITV Asian Media Awards.

Chowdhry began his stand up career in 1998 performing in pubs and clubs around London, often risking racial attacks. He hosted the Channel 4 comedy series Stand Up for the Week as of the fifth series, having been a regular act for the third and fourth series. Chowdhry was the first British act to perform at the Caribbean Comedy Festival in Trinidad in 2003. He has been a guest panelist on 8 out of 10 Cats, Comedy World Cup, and Sorry, I Didn't Know. He has appeared on Live at the Apollo twice, in 2012 and 2015.

In 2016, he was one of the contestants on series three of the comedy show Taskmaster. In 2017, he was a guest stand-up performer in The Russell Howard Hour and also sold out the 10,000-seater Wembley Arena, becoming the first British Asian stand-up comic to do so.

In 2020, Chowdhry appeared in the television drama series Devils.

Since 2021, he has been hosting the podcast The Paul Chowdhry PudCast, in which he interviews comedians. He uses the signature phrase "what's happening white people?" at the start of his stand-up routines.

He performed Family-Friendly Comedian in Riyadh as part of the "Riyadh Laughs" comedy festival on 1 December 2023.

== Influences ==
Chowdhry lists his influences as: "Richard Pryor, Eddie Murphy, George Carlin and Sam Kinison. Then Morecambe and Wise, Little and Large and Bruce Forsyth."

== Incidents during shows ==
Chowdhry was attacked by a heckler in 2004 at the Bound And Gagged club; the police attended but no arrests were made. In 2017, a man was arrested after causing distress and abusive language at the Marina Theatre during Chowdhry's 'Live Innit' performance. In 2025, a fight broke out in the theatre stalls within the Cliffs Pavilion due to a heckler interrupting Chowdhry throughout the performance.

== Personal life ==
Chowdhry makes an effort to keep fit during touring, telling Coach magazine: "I don't eat chapatis, even though I'm Indian" – and replacing them with higher-protein substitutes like bulgur wheat and quinoa. "If I only had ten minutes to work out, I'd do high-intensity abs training." He has also spoken about his battles with mental health in the New Statesman: "Mental health problems aren't really discussed in the Asian community."

Talking to the South China Morning Post, he said, "People see you as an Asian comedian, whereas the other two guys coming to Hong Kong (Sean Meo and Michael McIntyre) aren't Asian comedians – they're just British. But they're not referred to as 'English white comedians'. I'm British. I was born in England. The fact that I'm Asian has very little to do with my stand-up, although it would have an influence for an obvious reason because of the way I'm perceived by certain people. So I play on the stereotypes and try to change them."

== Stand-up shows ==
Year	Title	Notes
2010–11	Not PC	
2012	What's Happening White People?	
2014–15	PC's World	
2017–18	Live Innit	
2022–23	Family-Friendly Comedian (no children)	
2025	Englandia	

=== DVD releases ===
Title	Released	Notes
What's Happening White People?	19 November 2012	Live at London's Hammersmith Apollo
PC's World - Live 2015	30 November 2015	Live at London's Hammersmith Apollo
Live Innit	19 August 2019	Amazon Prime Video special Live at London's Hackney Empire

=== Stage ===
In early 2003 Chowdhry appeared on stage as "shady, Archers-obsessed Raheem" in the play Finding Bin Laden.

== Filmography ==
Year	Film	Role
1999	The Colour of Funny	Raj Mahal
1999	Rogue Trader	Uncredited
2000	It Was an Accident	Rafiq Roy
2002	Bollywood Queen	Uncredited
2005	Colour Me Kubrick	Pub Announcer
2008	The Blue Tower	Dil
2011	Swinging with the Finkels	Henry
2016	Taskmaster	Contestant
2020	Devils	Kalim Chowdrey
2021	Cruella	Kebab Restaurant Owner
2021	The Cleaner	Man Boy (1 episode)
2026	Taskmaster	Himself (guest appearance)

== See also ==
- List of British Sikhs
