= Stand Up for the Week =

British television comedy series

- Presented by: Patrick Kielty; Kevin Bridges; Jon Richardson; Paul Chowdhry
- Starring: Kevin Bridges; Rich Hall; Andi Osho; Jack Whitehall; Jon Richardson; Paul Chowdhry; Sara Pascoe; Seann Walsh; Josh Widdicombe; Andrew Lawrence; Angela Barnes; Simon Evans; Romesh Ranganathan
- Country of origin: United Kingdom
- Original language: English
- No. of series: 5
- No. of episodes: 42

Production
- Production locations: KOKO, Camden, London; Clapham Grand, Clapham, London
- Running time: 50 minutes
- Production company: Open Mike Productions

Original release
- Network: Channel 4
- Release: 25 June 2010 – 20 December 2013

Stand Up for the Week is a British television comedy series that was shown on Channel 4, featuring stand-up comedy performances reflecting topical events. The show began in June 2010 with a six-episode series aired on Friday nights, moving to Saturday nights for the second series which began in March 2011. The first series was hosted by Patrick Kielty, with regular performers Jack Whitehall, Kevin Bridges, Andi Osho and Rich Hall. Bridges replaced Kielty as host for the second series, with Jon Richardson joining as a regular performer. Richardson took over as host of the show for the third series which aired in late 2011, and aside from Rich Hall returning, an otherwise entirely new group of regular performers joined the show: Seann Walsh, Sara Pascoe, Josh Widdicombe and Paul Chowdhry. For the fourth series Andrew Lawrence replaced Rich Hall. For the fifth series, Chowdhry took over as host and new regulars Angela Barnes, Simon Evans and Romesh Ranganathan replaced Chowdhry, Lawrence and Pascoe. In October 2015 Channel 4 confirmed there are no plans to produce more episodes of the show.

== Format ==
Each episode features an introduction and performance from the host, and routines from the regular performers with the first two series also including routines from a guest performer. Some of the regular performers have specific themes. In the first series Whitehall's routine focused on celebrity news, Osho's on the internet, and Bridges' on sport, with Richardson taking on this theme at the start of the second series.

The first series also featured a segment called "The Chair", in which a celebrity guest sat through a two-minute comedy routine about themselves from Kielty, after which they had 30 seconds to talk about or defend themselves.

== Production ==
The first two series were recorded at KOKO in Camden, London, in front of a live audience. The third series switched to the Clapham Grand in South London. An unaired "try out" episode was made before filming of the first series began.

== Episodes ==
=== Series 1 ===
Episode	Guest performer	"The Chair" guest	Original airdate
1	Brendon Burns	Lembit Öpik	25 June 2010
2	Mark Watson	Peter Shilton	2 July 2010
3	Micky Flanagan	John McCririck	9 July 2010
4	Tom Stade	Bez	16 July 2010
5	Stephen K. Amos	Chico	23 July 2010
6	Steve Hughes	Chantelle Houghton	30 July 2010
7	Compilation episode		20 August 2010
8	Compilation episode		27 August 2010

=== Series 2 ===
Episode	Guest performer	Original airdate
1	Micky Flanagan	12 March 2011
2	Seann Walsh	19 March 2011
3	Mike Wilmot	26 March 2011
4	Paul Chowdhry	2 April 2011
5	Carl Donnelly	9 April 2011
6	Josh Widdicombe	16 April 2011
7	Tom Stade	23 April 2011
8	Neil Delamere	30 April 2011
9	Andrew Lawrence	7 May 2011
10	Dave Fulton	14 May 2011

=== Series 3 ===
Episode	Original airdate
1	4 November 2011
2	11 November 2011
3	19 November 2011
4	25 November 2011
5	2 December 2011
6	9 December 2011

=== Series 4 ===
Episode	Original airdate
1	27 April 2012
2	4 May 2012
3	11 May 2012
4	18 May 2012
5	25 May 2012
6	1 June 2012
7	8 June 2012
8	15 June 2012
9	22 June 2012
10	29 June 2012

=== Series 5 ===
Episode	Original airdate
1	1 November 2013
2	8 November 2013
3	15 November 2013
4	22 November 2013
5	29 November 2013
6	6 December 2013
7	13 December 2013
8	20 December 2013
