= Outsiders (British TV series) =

British comedy television show

- Genre: Game show
- Presented by: David Mitchell
- Theme music composer: Oli Julian
- Country of origin: United Kingdom
- Original language: English
- No. of series: 3
- No. of episodes: 18

Production
- Running time: 60 minutes (inc. adverts)
- Production companies: That M&W Company and Renegade Pictures (2021-22); Wall to Wall Media and That M&W Company (2023)

Original release
- Network: Dave
- Release: 29 September 2021 – 15 November 2023

Outsiders is a British comedy game show broadcast on Dave. Pairs of comedians compete in survival-themed tasks for badges awarded by the host, David Mitchell. On release, the show was widely compared to Taskmaster, a Dave original programme in which comedians were set tasks to complete as individuals, which had moved to Channel 4 in 2020.

In the first series, which began in September 2021, the contestants were Toussaint Douglass, Ed Gamble, Kerry Godliman, Jessica Knappett, Jamali Maddix and Lou Sanders. Series 2 was shown from November to December 2022 with Maisie Adam, Fatiha El-Ghorri, Darren Harriott, Jessica Hynes, Phil Wang and Joe Wilkinson. Series 3 of Outsiders began on 11 October 2023, with contestants Roisin Conaty, Alan Davies, Guz Khan, Judi Love, Chris McCausland and Laura Smyth.

Outsiders was confirmed as cancelled in August 2025.

== Production ==
The panel show Outsiders was announced alongside other Dave productions — Question Team, The Island, British As Folk — on 5 May 2021. It consists of six hour-long episodes, with Mitchell judging three pairs of comedians. The first series began on 29 September 2021.

Mitchell was approached by the producers with a Scouting-based theme in which comedians would compete for badges. To add significance to the concept, he suggested the programme should be "about the survival of humans in the wild", with specific reference to the COVID-19 pandemic, and, as such, it was filmed entirely outdoors. Mitchell reported good relationships with Dave, who welcomed the production team's input and were pleased with the final product. The filming lasted a week and saw good weather. The tent in which Mitchell resided was designed after his personality, with old-style furniture and military paraphernalia. While contestants slept in tents overnight, Mitchell returned to his home.

According to Mitchell, in the first series, each pairing had tension within it, but not nastiness. Godliman positioned herself as a keen camper but her teammate, Douglass, felt he was doing most of the work; Gamble was competitive but his partner Sanders did not care about the results; and Knappett acted as "a sort of adoring pretend-wife" to Maddix, who had "a real survival streak". Mitchell described his role as "a slightly befuddled, irascible and indecisive leader".

The series drew comparisons to Taskmaster, where contestants compete individually in a number of tasks that are then judged in a studio show. Taskmaster was originally a Dave programme, but moved to Channel 4 in 2020. It had been one of Dave's most successful original programmes, with high rating figures, a number of awards and several international adaptations. The contestants in the first series, other than Douglass, had all appeared in Taskmaster; three of them had won their series. Mitchell said that, rather than modelling his hosting style on Greg Davies, the eponymous Taskmaster, he drew on his chairing of the radio show The Unbelievable Truth.

== Transmissions ==
| Series | Episodes | Originally released | |
| Series | Episodes | First released | Last released |
|---|---|---|---|
| 1 | 6 | 29 September 2021 | 3 November 2021 |
| 2 | 6 | 16 November 2022 | 21 December 2022 |
| 3 | 6 | 11 October 2023 | 15 November 2023 |

Outsiders was repeated on BBC Two and added to BBC iPlayer beginning on 30 January 2024.

== Reception ==
Steve Bennett of Chortle rated the show 3.5 out of five stars, praising the relationships between the contestants and the "dry wit" of Douglass. Bennett noted that Mitchell was "less mercurial and arbitrary" than Greg Davies, but that the tasks were "relatively mundane". Stuart Heritage of The Guardian also felt that the tasks were uninspired in comparison to the "dazzlingly inventive" challenges seen on Taskmaster, since they could only be solved in a small number of ways. He had praise for the cast, however, particularly Sanders, and enjoyed listening to the group's fireside banter. Bruce Dessau gave a positive review in Beyond the Joke, finding the show "a lot of fun to watch" and praising Mitchell as "a great host, playing up to his bumptious persona".
