= Andrew Lawrence (comedian) =

English comedian

- Education: University of St Andrews
- Occupation: Comedian
- Years active: 2003–present
- Website: andrewlawrencecomedy.co.uk

Andrew Lawrence is an English comedian who works in stand-up comedy, radio and television.

== Early life and education ==
Lawrence attended Tiffin School and the University of St Andrews, where he began his stand-up career at a regular comedy night.

== Stage career ==
Lawrence's university debut led to appearances at the Edinburgh Fringe; he was runner up in the 2003 So You Think You're Funny competition.

His 2007 Fringe show, Social Leprosy For Beginners & Improvers, was nominated for the main if.comedy award.

As well as touring shows in the UK, Lawrence has performed abroad at the Just For Laughs Montreal Festival Showcase and the Melbourne International Comedy Festival.

== TV and radio career ==
Lawrence has featured in numerous radio and TV shows, mostly as a stand-up performer. He has also appeared on television as a comic actor, playing the builder Marco in the BBC TV sitcom Ideal. He has written and performed four series for BBC Radio 4, most recently the 2015 sitcom There Is No Escape.

== Reasons to Kill Yourself ==
In 2015 his first book, Reasons to Kill Yourself, was published. The book is based on his stage show of the same name, which was largely about anything that annoyed him and with a particular focus on the state of the stand-up comedy landscape. Writing for Chortle, reviewer Jay Anderson wrote that "The poetic precision and rancid, colourful vocabulary of his stand-up are missing on the whole, the dense passages of escalating, poisonous adjective becoming increasingly less punchy as the book wears on."

== Political views ==
On 25 October 2014, Lawrence wrote a lengthy post on his official Facebook page drawing attention to a perceived rise in "'political' comedians cracking cheap and easy gags about UKIP, to the extent that it's got hack, boring and lazy very quickly" and described such comedians as being "out of touch, smug, superannuated, overpaid TV comics with their cosy lives in their west-London ivory towers taking a supercilious, moralising tone, pandering to the ever-creeping militant political correctness of the BBC". Although having previously appeared on several comedy programmes on the channel, he went on to describe "liberal back-slapping panel shows like Mock the Week" as consisting of "aging, balding, fat men, ethnic comedians and women-posing-as-comedians, sit congratulating themselves on how enlightened they are about the fact that UKIP are ridiculous and pathetic".

The post, and subsequent Twitter disputes with fellow comedians such as Dara Ó Briain and Frankie Boyle, were covered by the UK press. On 3 October 2015, he commented on his political beliefs in a post on his website, stating that "I've noticed a number of journalists in comedy have taken to labelling me a 'right-wing comedian'... I don't subscribe to any political ideology and I am not in any way affiliated with any political organisation." However, he also acknowledged that he has "certainly been very critical of the resurgent hard-left wing in British politics" and "critical of left-wing hysteria on the internet, and the left-wing establishment in comedy".

== Controversial comments ==
In July 2021, following the defeat of the England national football team in the final of the UEFA Euro 2020 competition on penalties to Italy, Lawrence tweeted that "All I'm saying is the white guys scored🤷‍♂️". After Twitter users challenged him, he quoted his original tweet, stating that "I can see that this has offended a lot of people, and I'm sorry that black guys are bad at penalties. 🙏". Following the incident, multiple venues cancelled his upcoming shows and publicly denounced his comments as racist. He was also dropped by his agent. In November 2021, Lawrence broke his silence on the subject and posted a response on YouTube.

In May 2025, following the mass casualty traffic incident during Liverpool Football Club's victory parade, Lawrence posted on X that he would "drive through crowds of people" to get out of the city, leading to widespread criticism and the cancellation of his upcoming comedy gig in Southend. In response, he expressed his disappointment that the venue had "lost their courage after being bombarded with abuse and threats of violence from online trolls".

== TV and radio credits ==
=== TV ===
| Year | Title | Role | Channel |
|---|---|---|---|
| 2007–10 | Ideal | Marco | BBC Three |
| 2010 | Michael MacIntyre's Comedy Roadshow | Stand-up | BBC One |
| 2010 | Dave's One Night Stand | Stand-up | Dave |
| 2011 | Live at the Apollo | Stand-up | BBC One |
| 2012 | Stand Up for the Week | Regular performer | Channel 4 |
| 2013 | John Bishop's Only Joking | Regular performer | Sky 1 |
| 2016 | The Outcast Comic | Documentary | Sky Arts |

=== Radio ===
| Year | Title | Role | Channel |
|---|---|---|---|
| 2006–07 | Shipwrecked | Presenter | Channel 4 Radio |
| 2010 | What To Do If You're Not Like Everybody Else (Series 1) | Writer, performer | BBC Radio 4 |
| 2011 | What To Do If You're Not Like Everybody Else (Series 2) | Writer, performer | BBC Radio 4 |
| 2012 | How Did We End Up Like This? | Writer, performer | BBC Radio 4 |
| 2015 | There Is No Escape | Writer, Andrew | BBC Radio 4 |

== Awards ==
| Year | Award | Result |
|---|---|---|
| 2003 | So You Think You're Funny? | Runner-up |
| 2004 | York Comedy Festival New Act of the Year | Winner |
| 2004 | Amused Moose Starsearch 2004 | Winner |
| 2004 | BBC New Act of the Year | Winner |
| 2006 | if.comedy award (Best Newcomer) | Nominated |
| 2006 | Sony Radio Awards | Nominated |
| 2007 | if.comedy award (Best Act) | Nominated |
| 2010 | Chortle Award – Best UK Headline Act | Nominated |
| 2011 | Chortle Award – Best UK Headline Act | Nominated |
