= Area Boys (film) =

2007 Nigerian Drama short film

- Still image from the film
- Directed by: Omelihu Nwanguma
- Screenplay by: Oladipo Agboluaje
- Produced by: Inspire Film & Media
- Starring: Eddie Kadi, Akeem Olatunbosun, Dele Awosile, Janet-Nicole Nzekwe
- Cinematography: Moncho Aldamiz
- Edited by: James Norris
- Music by: Sukjin Chang
- Release date: 2007
- Running time: 27 minutes
- Countries: Nigeria; United Kingdom

Area Boys is a short Nigerian film released in 2007 in Nigeria and the UK, starring Eddie Kadi, Akeem Olatunbosun, Dele Awosile, and Janet-Nicole Nzekwe, directed by Omelihu Nwanguma under Inspire Film & Media.

== Synopsis ==
Friends, Bode and Obi, are born and grow up in a world where corruption and greed override all else. They decide to cut ties with their boss because they want to establish their own business partnership to better fend against the corruption surrounding them. But their plans leak out before they begin when they plot to move against Charles Darwin and he finds out about it. Fleeing the city and Darwin, the pair discovers the true value of friendship.

== Prizes ==
- 2018 Sony Film Festival
