= Fatiha El-Ghorri =

British comedian and writer (born 1981)

- El-Ghorri in 2026
- Born: 1981 (age 44–45); Hackney, London, England
- Occupations: Comedian, writer
- Years active: 2015–present
- Known for: Stand-up comedy, television appearances
- Notable work: Work in Progress; Taskmaster
- Website: www.fatihaelghorri.co.uk

Fatiha El-Ghorri (born 1981) is a British comedian and writer.

== Early life ==
El-Ghorri's family is from the town of Larache in Morocco. She was born in the London Borough of Hackney, where she grew up with twelve siblings. Her father died when she was six years old.

== Career ==
In 2015, El-Ghorri began a course on comedy writing and performance which she found through the online platform Meetup and went on to pursue a career in stand-up comedy. She was a finalist in the Funny Women in London competition and for the Max Turner Prize, and toured as part of the Super Muslim Comedy Tour alongside Esther Manito and Abdullah Afzal. El-Ghorri has performed around the UK, in venues such as the Royal Albert Hall, as well as in Dubai.

On television, El-Ghorri performed her stand-up on Jonathan Ross' Comedy Club on ITV in 2020 and The Russell Howard Hour on Sky Max in 2021. She is a frequent guest on panel shows and talk shows, including Sorry, I Didn't Know and The Jonathan Ross Show in 2021, Big Zuu's Big Eats in 2022, and Guessable and Alan Davies: As Yet Untitled in 2023. El-Ghorri was one of six cast members on the second series of the game show Outsiders.

El-Ghorri has appeared on podcasts, including Off Menu with Ed Gamble and James Acaster and The Guilty Feminist.

In 2023, she performed a solo tour called Work in Progress across the UK. The show debuted at the Leicester Comedy Festival and won the award for Best Debut Show.

In 2024, El-Ghorri and five other female Muslim comedians – Yasmin Elhady, Ola Labib, Fathiya Saleh, Zain, and Shazia Mirza – went on a five-city tour around the UK. The Comedy Queens, as they were dubbed, platformed a real variety of Muslim women. There was a range of political and observational material, one-liners and social commentary.

In December 2024, she appeared on The Great British Sewing Bee for the show's celebrity Christmas special. The same month, she also appeared on annual special The Big Fat Quiz of Everything as a contestant.

In January 2025, El-Ghorri was announced as one of the contestants for the 19th series of Taskmaster, against Jason Mantzoukas, Mathew Baynton, Rosie Ramsey, and Stevie Martin. The series has received rave reviews from critics and audiences, crediting it as one of the best series in years for its cast. El-Ghorri also co-wrote and starred in the BBC comedy pilot, Donkey! The episode served as one of six BBC comedy pilots aired to test potential series. She also served as Head Judge for the BBC New Comedy Awards.

From February to March 2025, El-Ghorri hosted the fourth season of BBC Asian Network's Not Even Water, which focused on Ramadan. She interviewed a variety of guests, including Mayor of London Sadiq Khan, comedians Shabaz Ali and Muhsin Yesilada and content creators Sebinaah and Nadoosh to discuss faith, fasting and everything about Ramadan.

== Personal life ==
El-Ghorri is Muslim and wears a hijab; she has spoken publicly about "smashing the stereotypes people have of Muslim, hijabi women". She is bilingual, speaking English and Moroccan Arabic.

El-Ghorri has been married and divorced twice.

El-Ghorri revealed on The Great Celebrity Pottery Throwdown 2026 that she previously had endometrial cancer and had a full hysterectomy.

== Filmography ==
=== Television ===
Year	Title	Role	Notes
2020	Jonathan Ross' Comedy Club	Self	Episode: #1.3
2021	The Russell Howard Hour	Self	Episode: #5.7
2021–2023	Sorry, I Didn't Know	Self – Panellist	2 episodes
2022	The Apprentice: You're Fired!	Self – Panellist	Episode: "Baby Food"
2022	Rhod Gilbert's Growing Pains	Self – Panellist	Episode: #4.5
2022	Big Zuu's Big Eats	Self – Special Guest	Episode: "Fatiha El-Ghorri'
2022	This Is My House	Self	Episode: "Tom's House"
2022	Outsiders	Self – Contestant	6 episodes
2023	Guessable?	Self – Panellist	Episode: "Oh Wait There's More Clues?"
2023	Alan Davies: As Yet Untitled	Self – Guest	Episode: "You'll Knock the Park Out of the Ball"
2023	BBC New Comedy Awards	Self – Judge	Episode: "Bethnal Green, London"
2024–present	Mr. Bigstuff	Aysha	7 episodes
2024	We Are Lady Parts	Teacher	Episode: "Don't Let Me Be Misunderstood"
2024	Out of Order	Self – Guest	Episode: #1.3
2024	Mel Giedroyc: Unforgivable	Self – Guest	Episode: #4.1
2024	The Last Leg	Self – Guest	Episode: "Election Special"
2024	Battle in the Box	Self – Contestant	2 episodes
2024	The Great British Sewing Bee	Self – Contestant	Episode: "Celebrity Christmas Special"
2024	Live at the Apollo	Self – Special Guest	Episode: #19.2
2025	The Big Fat Quiz of Everything	Self – Contestant	TV special
2025	Donkey!	Kenza	
2025	Pointless Celebrities	Self – Contestant	Episode: #17.12
2025	Taskmaster	Self – Contestant	10 episodes
2025	Silence Is Golden	Self	6 episodes
2025	Big Brother: Late & Live	Self – Panellist	Episode: #3.10
2025	Michael McIntyre's The Wheel	Self – Expert	Episode: #6.6
2025	The Weakest Link	Self – Contestant	Episode: "Party Special"
2025	QI XL	Self – Panellist	Episode: "Winter Wonderland"
2026	House of Games	Self – Contestant	5 episodes
2026	Boarders	Mrs. El Fassi	3 episodes
2026	Blankety Blank	Self – Panellist	Episode: #22.8
2026	Loose Women	Self – Panellist	3 episodes
2026	Unacceptable	Self – Panellist	Episode: #1.5
2026	8 Out of 10 Cats Does Countdown	Self – Panellist	Episode: #30.2
2026	The Great Celebrity Pottery Throwdown	Self – Contestant	5 episodes
