= Hedz =

British children's television series

- Created by: BBC
- Written by: Tim Dann; Fay Rusling; Oriane Messina; Larry Rickard; Neil Mossey; Ed Dyson; Claire Gillies; Bar Ben Yossef
- Starring: Various characters
- Country of origin: United Kingdom
- No. of series: 2
- No. of episodes: 28

Production
- Producer: Dominic MacDonald
- Production locations: River City set, Dumbarton
- Running time: 15 minutes

Original release
- Network: CBBC
- Release: 1 November 2007 – 24 January 2011

Related
- Sam & Mark's TMi Friday

Hedz is a children's satirical show produced by BBC Scotland for CBBC which parodies various celebrities and politicians as large cardboard cut-outs over people's faces (sometimes with clothing that resembles the celebrity). Voices were provided by Tim Dann, Rupert Degas, Peter Dickson, Adam Longworth, and Kate O'Sullivan. It is filmed on the same set of BBC Scotland soap opera River City.

The first series aired during the second series of the children's Saturday morning show TMi on BBC Two in 2007. A second series was produced in 2010 and was aired as part of Sam & Mark's TMi Friday on the CBBC Channel.

== Recurring gags ==
In Hedz, there are half-minute to a minute short gags, which are similar in one way or another for each character(s).

- For Russell Brand, he says his catchphrase "... if I tell a lie, let me beautiful barnet sprout forth!" at the beginning of his sketch, and then tells a series of lies, causing his hair to grow abnormally large. After three lies, he trips on his hair and falls down, ending the gag with "Betrayed by my own barnet! The shame!".
- For Orlando Bloom and Johnny Depp, they share a bath, where they play, argue and talk. By the end of the gag, Johnny Depp somehow causes Orlando Bloom to get out of the bathtub. However, at times Orlando gets his own back on Johnny (e.g. throwing Johnny's paper hat into the bath, causing it to go soggy and sink)
- For Simon Cowell, he first sneaks into his shed, where he tells Cat Deeley (who is in the form of a white cat) to "... bring me [Simon] the leaders of the free world!", causing Deeley to press a red button, bringing George W. Bush, Condoleezza Rice, Queen Elizabeth II, Gordon Brown, Romano Prodi and Bob Geldof onto H.Q.-like screens. After which he explains his "brilliant" plan, usually on the effects of global warming, where the leaders go wild in its sheer flawlessness (at the middle of Cowell's speech, Deeley explains the crucial flaws). After the pitch of his idea Cowell raises up his hands and goes, "For I am a genius!" When he does this a button loosens from Simon's trousers, so they fall down (revealing his boxer shorts) and is sprayed down with something got to do with his idea (e.g. if the plan contained toilet paper, toilet paper will rain down onto him), making the leaders laugh. Another ironic touch is that Deeley speaks in meows, with her words displayed as subtitles, and Cowell cannot understand her, although guesses she is positive about the idea, e.g. "Are you ready for my brilliant plan, Cat?" "No!" "I knew you would be, Cat." On his shed is a sign which says, 'Simon's shed keep out'. Already we can see Simon is not very bright; he writes the 'p' backwards.
- For Ant & Dec, they spot another celebrity couple from their tree house "oh Ant, can you see out?" and decide to set a trap for them "there's only room for ONE celebrity duo in this forest!", which fails. Afterwards, Ant gets caught by the same trap. The celebrity duos have included David/Victoria Beckham, Davina McCall/Dermot O'Leary, Barry/Paul Chuckle, Mary-Kate/Ashley Olsen, Arlene Phillips/Bruno Tonioli and Kylie/Dannii Minogue
- For David Tennant, he is doing something that rhymes with Who (As in Doctor Who). E.g. – he is sitting on a snooker cue and says 'I'm doctor cue!', or appearing twice and saying 'I'm doctor two!'.
- Arnold Schwarzenegger owns a video shop and the sketch always features a celebrity requesting a DVD of a movie starring that celebrity. However, Schwarzenegger will only sell them movies starring himself. The celebrity will proceed to attack Arnold in some way, only to be defeated by Arnold. After the celebrity leaves, an Arnold Schwarzenegger 'Bobble Head' says, 'They'll be back'. The only time Arnold has lost to a celebrity is when Anne Hathaway kissed him, turning him into a robotic frog.
- For Daniel Craig on a Boot Camp, an army of Daniel Craigs march and sing a song with the lyrics "We're competing day by day, 'til there's just one Daniel Craig" when drill sergeant Graham Norton suddenly jumps in and yells "SHUT UP!" Sgt. Norton informs the Daniel Craig's that they are at the camp competing for the role of 007 and so he sets the Daniel Craigs a task to survive as secret agents and warns them that the one who doesn't perform well enough will be eliminated and then Graham yells "Do I make myself clear?!" One Daniel Craig who is ironically portrayed as the odd-one-out wears a Pink Bow Tie and keeps annoying Graham by asking stupid questions "oh, could your write it down for me sir?" and always leaves Norton yelling "What in the name of International Espionage do you think you're doing? You are the weakest Daniel Craig, good-bye!"
- Gordon Brown is portrayed as "Mr. Brown", who lives at 10 Downing Street in a "Brown, Brown House in a Brown, Brown Street". Brown "has a country to run and is a very serious man...but then Mr.Brown does naughty things in the Brown, Brown House" and eventually breaks something, which is always followed by the narrator calling Brown a "silly man" and telling him to go to his room. Ex-Prime Minister Tony Blair has a cameo as the famous policeman who stands outside No.10 and usually gets covered in whatever Brown is messing about with.
- Formula 1 race driver Lewis Hamilton is portrayed as a man driving a Scalextric car around a track in a playroom. He then races against other celebrities such as Jackie Chan who try and cheat but fail, always resulting in Hamilton winning the race and spraying champagne everywhere.
- Celebrity chef Gordon Ramsay refers to himself in the third person and tries his best to accomplish even the simplest of tasks and when he makes a mishap it makes him mad and his face glows red with anger but he manages to calm himself down a couple of times but on his third mishap he gets so angry his face blows up and he says "Doh!, worst (whatever he is doing) ever, done!".
- For Robbie Williams he is portrayed as a Guardian Angel for Queen Elizabeth II, who will often try and help her with work that she doesn't need help doing, and getting her messy or injured as a result.
- For Billie Piper she is portrayed as a "fair maiden in distress" though she always argues with the narrator when he describes the simple problem she is in. The Narrator then tells the audience who will save her? "Golfing legend, turned outlaw Tiger Hood!" (Tiger Woods) who suddenly jumps into the scene in a fanfare and proceeds to help Billie by firing his golf clubs at the obstacle although she argues that he can make it so much easier for both of them if he just solves the problem without using his clubs! This distraction causes Tiger to lose his concentration and when he fires his clubs they always miss hit their target and bounce off objects and usually end up hitting Tiger in the face and then he takes out his putter and fires it (over Billie's continuous protests) and that too misses its target, bounces off trees and hits Billie in the face! Tiger then says he has either had enough or goes off to find his clubs leaving Billie fuming over the narrator's annoying speech "and so once again, Tiger Hood has saved the day!" Then the book closes, and Billie protests until the book is closed and she is silenced. The only time when this is the opposite is when Billie's fire was put out, and she wanted the lid to be closed so she could keep warm.
- For Jackie Chan, he stars in a show called 'Jackie Can', which sees him performing incredibly simple acts such as opening a door or turning on a light, however he uses somersaults and Kung-fu moves to do so. At the end, after something goes wrong (e.g. tripping over his own shoelaces, opening a door with brooms propped against it, resulting in the brooms falling onto him) he usually says 'Remember kids, don't try this at home!'
- For McFly, their cue is four flies flying around along with a buzzing noise. Sometimes there is a 'One Two Three Four' before they burst into song. McFly are the only characters in Hedz who sing with squeaky voices. Apart from Cat Deeley, they are the other animal characters in the form of four flies in different colours; yellow (Danny), blue (Tom), green (Dougie), and red (Harry). All but Harry are seen holding guitars, but Harry holds a drum. At the end, one member of McFly hits their head on the camera and a ring of stars appear above their heads before they drop out of the frame. Sometimes an 'ouch' can be heard.
- For Beyoncé, she is first seen as an ordinary cleaner until her pink phone beeps. Once she hears the crisis, she instantly turns into a pop princess with a silver B on her bum. She normally says, "Me and my booty go save that cutie" before rushing off to the crisis. She uses her bum to shake things free (e.g. the ball from the basketball hoop, Cat Deely from the tree). After whoever she was helping says thank you she often replies with "I'm Beyoncé usin' my butt to save yours!" Then she rushes off. Beyoncé is always heard talking in rhymes.
- For 8 episodes, celebrities big in the pop world are squashed by the Phantom Flattener using a garden roller. Ozzy and Sharon Osbourne read the newspaper and find out about the flattened pop star. They visit the scene of the crime before spotting the Phantom Flattener. Then they chase the Flattener down the same route, stopping half way at a bus stop, where Kelly and Jack Osbourne are. The family chases the Flattener, who normally escapes. During the last episode, they change tactics and trick the Flattener before unmasking the fiend, who is really Charlotte Church.
- For Len Goodman, Arlene Phillips and Bruno Tonioli, they are sitting down as a family eating dinner. Len asks for an item, and Arlene and Bruno both put their hands on the item. This triggers them dancing to music and a disco ball. We can hear Len Goodman making comments and saying how awful their performance is. Once they've finished dancing they return to the table and hand Len his item. Len then gets disappointed as his food has gone cold and therefore he gives them "a big, fat, zero" (0 points) and then says "Join us next week when I'll be asking for [another thing on the table!]".
- For Girls Aloud, all the girls but Sarah create a beat using whatever they have at the location (e.g. library, exam hall). Sarah always destroys their beat by making a loud sound. Then she laughs as the other girls complain.
- For Paris Hilton, the camera is mostly on her while she brags on (e.g. about a party where everyone dresses as her, how beautiful she is). At times the camera changes to see Noodles. Near the end of the sketch, Hilton normally goes, "Tantrum time! Tantrum! Tantrum!" and wails loudly (e.g. "I want my big sunglasses!"). This normally results in Noodles going, "Woof!" angrily and punishing her (e.g. blowing the hair-dryer at her which messes up her hair, throwing her into the river, throwing her onto the ground and then urinating on her)
- For Jamie Oliver, he is portrayed as a chef with an exaggerated lisp, who jumps about and yells. He has a fridge which resembles a prison cell containing a few vegetables who angrily want him to let them out, but he refuses.
- For Wayne Rooney there are two Wayne twins and they like to do girly things such as ballet and watercolour painting. This usually ends in a mess such as tripping over while dancing.

== Twists ==
For the last episode of Hedz, they created twists for some of the sketches.

- For the Rooney Twins, they go head to head with their rivals The Clooney Twins. Their feud ends with them becoming friends and having a tea party.
- For Len Goodman, Arlene Phillips and Bruno Tonioli, instead of giving Phillips and Tonioli zero, Goodman gave them a ten.
- For Gordon Ramsay, he is seen looking after his 'son', who is really a mini version of Ramsay tucked in a buggy. After being mad three times, he explodes. Similarly, after crying three times, his 'son' explodes.
- For Jackie Chan, he makes a phone call to Arnie's Video shop. Instead of doing something wrong on himself, he throws the phone away, only to accidentally hit and smash the camera lens.
- For Ant & Dec, they almost manage to squash Mary-Kate and Ashley. They lower a ton on the two girls, only to result in them holding onto it and doing workouts. Ant and Dec also hold onto it and the girls let go, resulting in both Ant and Dec being flattened.
- For Beyoncé, instead of saving someone, she has a shake-off with her arch enemy J-Lo, who uses her bum for evil, unlike Beyoncé, who uses it for good. Beyoncé beats J-Lo and sends her away.
- For Jamie Oliver, the vegetables in his fridge finally manage to escape his clutches by tricking him with cardboard cutouts and sailing away on a mini boat, as they happily travel around the world, much to his dismay.
- For the Flatner, Ozzy and Sharon finally unmask the villain revealing it is actually Charlotte Church who says she did it so there will be no more singers and she would be top of the charts!

== Series 2 ==
In the second series, Hedz features several new characters and sketches in addition to returning ones.

Top Gear: Instead of a car, Jeremy Clarkson reviews an ordinary household or office appliance, treating it like it is an authentic motor, much to Richard Hammond's despair as he is the only one that can see sense. Hammond eventually summons The Stig to run down Clarkson and end his humiliating reports. James May often appears wanting to have a go on what Clarkson is reviewing.

Lord Alan Sugar hires a celebrity to be a substitute teacher, but ends up firing them due to the celebrity doing something they were told not to do.

Ross Kemp Nature Trails: Ross Kemp attempts to show viewers how to use squirrels in day-to-day survival methods when lost in a forest, but his suggestions always disturb or endanger a squirrel, forcing them to take action against him and drag him away to parts unknown.

The Police Fruit and Vegetable Unit: Police officers PC Gav Matthew Horne and PC Smithy James Corden try to catch the elusive "Fruit and Vegetable Thief" (secretly Jamie Oliver) who has been stealing fruit and vegetables, but ends up giving them the slip. Later on, they have lunch at The Healthy Snacks Bar, where they compliment Jamie on the food he has made for them, claiming he got the ingredients from somewhere (when really they were from the fruit and vegetable that he stole earlier). He then proceeds to lie to them about the thief's whereabouts, causing them to leave the bar, in which he then giggles to the audience on how they'll never figure out who the thief really is.

Fearne and Holly's World Tour: Fearne Cotton and Holly Willoughby are on a world tour, but they're too busy on their phones that they do not notice what is happening in the background like the Leaning Tower of Pisa taking off like a rocket.

For Lady Gaga, she starts out going for a walk, until something falls on her head like a seagull or a piano, in which she will then cry about it, only for Gok Wan to appear to tell her that she actually looks fabulous, making her feel better as a result, much to the annoyance of the announcer. Usually her "new hat" often backfires on her, such as her "seagull hat" flying with her attached to it.

The Ant and Dec sketch returns, but their location has been changed from a forest to a caravan park.

Harry Hill's Useful Safety Tips: Harry Hill offers useful safety tips, that usually involves him doing something dangerous, in which he announces "what could possibly go wrong", only to be hit by a large object offscreen, in which he'll respond with "what are the chances of that happening, eh?". Harry Hill's head also appears in animated segments that involves an egg shaped version of his head getting into scenarios that always ends with it getting squashed.

Jackie Chan's After School Club: Similar to the "Jackie Can" sketches, only this time, Jackie Chan teaches children certain school tips like eating a packed lunch or packing a school bag. The sketches always end with Jackie Chan breaking his back, in which he responds "Jackie's back! It go crack!"

Zac and Vanessa's Exciting Night In: The sketch always starts off with a flashy intro, but when it finishes, the sketch usually shows Zac Efron and Vanessa Hudgens doing something not very exciting like changing the TV channel.

For Cheryl, she is often seen on a date with a random male celebrity, only for a jealous Joe McElderry to trick him into leaving, just so he can have Cheryl all to himself.

Name That Cheese: James May appears as a contestant where he tries to name a certain cheese but ends up not knowing what it is.

The Lewis Hamilton Living Room Grand Prix sketch has been changed into the Bedroom Grand Prix and they have scrapped Hamilton in favour of a different celebrity each time.

Doctor Who M.D.: The Doctor (now represented by a "head" of Matt Smith) and his nurse Amy (Karen Gillan) "diagnose" patients with simple medical emergencies, but instead of coming to normal conclusions, The Doctor assumes the ailments have been caused by alien intervention or a torque in the space/time continuum and attempts an over-the-top means of dealing with the problem that, in several instances, disintegrates the patients.

Anne Robinson's Bedtime Story: Miley Cyrus is reading a bedtime story to Anne Robinson, who in term, questions the logic of each story, much to Miley's annoyance. But once she goes off to bed before the story is even finishes, Miley then proceeds to make her curious about a certain part of it, in which she then turns off the light before Anne has the chance of knowing.

Inside Beyoncé's Mind: Beyoncé and Jay-Z are at a restaurant ordering food. Whenever Jay-Z offers two different orders of food to Beyoncé, she can't seem to decide what she wants. The camera will then zoom into her mind where Simon Cowell, Alesha Dixon and Louis Walsh, in an X Factor style judge stand, decide on which food she is getting. Once the judges make the decision, the camera zooms out from her mind and makes her order. Only to then be pelted with the very food she ordered, in which she responds "bad decision".

Harry Potter vs Twilight: Daniel Radcliffe, who pretends to be Harry Potter, attempts to petition himself into a role in the new Twilight movie under the motif that "wizards are cool"; in doing so he constantly interrupts key moments of filming with the film's iconic lead characters.

For Jay-Z, he starts off rapping how he always used to collaborate with other artists, and proceeds to introduce a new artist he is collaborating with, only for their rapping to be less than stellar, in which he'll respond with "oh man, what was I thinking?!!".

Bargain Time!: In a retail store, a celebrity asks Karen Gillan about the details of a specific item they are looking for, with Louie Spence listening in hoping they ask for a bargain. Karen, not wanting them to go for a bargain, will direct the celebrity to different product varieties, but the celebrity refuses, stating that they are looking for a bargain. This prompts Louie to go into a complete song and dance number about all the different offers of the product, transforming the store into a disco and making a mess in the process. Once the song and dance number is done, the manager always calls Karen to clean up the mess just made in that particular isle, much to her annoyance.

For Alexandra Burke, an announcer will state if she is struggling with something and would like some help with it, such as writing an autobiography. She asks the announcer if he could help her, in which he will decline, but knows to perfect person to help her; Amir Khan, who then proceeds to "help her out" by destroying the very item she was using with his boxing gloves, much to her dismay.

Random Team: At the conclusion of most (not all) of the episode of this season, this sketch airs. It focuses mainly on a celebrity having a minor accident in their kitchen and summoning the awkwardly paired team of Barack Obama (portrayed as "Dr. Yes"), Gok Wan (portrayed as "Mr. Gorgeous") and Gordon Ramsay (portrayed as "The Gordon") to help them deal with the issue. Despite some suggestions, the trio offer nothing that helps remedy the situation and eventually always allow Gordon to destroy the kitchen in order to "fix" the issue before leaving for another assignment.

== Awards ==
In 2008, Hedz won the BAFTA Children's Entertainment Award.

== Trivia ==
- Britney Spears was supposed to appear in a lot more sketches of her own (where she was a manic hair-dresser who chopped off everyone's hair) but as the show coincided with her breakdown, it was thought that it would be in poor taste for the programme, and thus she was cut out of the remaining programmes.
- Hedz won a Scottish BAFTA for 'Best Children's Programme' in November 2008.
