= OOglies =

BBC children's animated television series

- DVD cover
- Also known as: OOglies Funsize
- Genre: Comedy
- Created by: Nick Hopkin; Tim Dann; Austin Low
- Written by: Tim Dann Nick Hopkin Austin Low
- Presented by: Peter Dickson
- Starring: Tim Dann; Peter Dickson; Shelley Longworth
- Opening theme: Peter Dickson
- Composers: Andy Blythe and Martin Joustra
- Country of origin: United Kingdom
- Original language: English
- No. of seasons: 3
- No. of episodes: 46

Production
- Production location: BBC Scotland
- Editor: John Steventon
- Camera setup: 4K Quality
- Running time: 15 min. per episode (5 min. for Funsize)
- Production company: BBC Scotland

Original release
- Network: CBBC
- Release: 10 August – 14 September 2009
- Release: 16 March – 27 March 2015

OOglies is a stop-motion animated children's television series produced by BBC Scotland for CBBC, and distributed worldwide by Classic Media. The show involves short sketches that play for 30 seconds to a minute starring household items and food, virtually all of which have googly eyes stuck on, hence the show's title.

The show first aired on 10 August 2009, on both CBBC and BBC HD and is directed to children six to 11 years old. The commission was for two series of 13 shows, each 15 minutes long. The shows were produced in a block over five months in Glasgow. Voices are provided by Tim Dann, Peter Dickson, and Shelley Longworth. The series was created and written by Nick Hopkin, Tim Dann, and Austin Low. The show returned in 2015 as OOglies Funsize.

== Meet the OOglies ==
There are groups of characters who appear with similar gags multiple times; sometimes, the characters meet each other. Episodes begin with a mock safety announcement voiced by Peter Dickson, telling viewers that all stunts "have been performed by trained OOglies". In OOglies Funsize, the message "It's time for OOglies!" is added on.

- Playful Grapes and Clumsy Melonhead – A group of green grapes are playing until a clumsy watermelon tries to join them, usually ending up squashing the grapes. The pre-opening sketch in Series 1. In Series 2 Episode 3, the remote saved the grapes from being squashed again and throws the watermelon into a bowl of oatmeal.
- Boo Potato – A sprouting potato often lays "traps" for a random OOglie character to come and observe. When it is close enough, the potato jumps out with a "BOO!" and scares the OOglie, resulting in them falling apart or breaking. The pre-opening sketch in Series 2.
- Strawberry Lovers – A pair of amorous strawberries meet across a gap in the counter and the male lover tries to get across, but is always unsuccessful and often ends up being squashed. They finally get together in the last episode of Series 1, even if the female lover's dad didn't approve.
- The Cherry-aiders – Four cherries make up an air ambulance team using a flying mixer and go to help another OOglie, ending with the team causing more damage than normal.
- Lonely Sprout – A Brussels sprout tries to join in with or save other OOglies, but ends up failing. In the last episode of Series 1, he got to be with a chicken, a parsnip, a potato and other Brussels sprouts just like him on Christmas Day. And in Series 2 in episode 6, the Makeup Makeover Crew like him.
- Stunt Tomato – A tomato in a cape and mask tries to do impressive tricks for three cherry tomatoes, but always ends up getting injured.
- Slippery Nana – A banana skin keeps slipping over, usually breaking objects around it.
- Racey Bacon and Mr. Bun – A slice of bacon is running away from a bun and hides somewhere disguising itself as something else. It escapes from the bun, but it ends up backfiring (such as being sprayed with water or covered in ketchup, respectively by a human).
- Zombie Vegetables – An OOglie food is tossed into a bin by a human where a rotting Parsnip and Potato live. Although seemingly menacing at first, the rotting foods quickly show their friendship to newcomers through flatulence, which often backfires on them when their "visitors" try and copy them.
- The Stapler Dogs – A stapler pranks three dogs (staple removers) by getting them to jump off their shelf.
- Baby Blocks – Three toy blocks, a blue cube, a pink cylinder and a yellow triangular prism are babies, and go off to investigate something which ends up scaring them with a loud noise, causing them to cry and run back to the safety of their toybox.
- The Fruit Bunch and Devious Blender – An orange sees something and tells a banana, an apple and a pear about it. They go over to investigate, but find out that it is in fact a villainous blender in disguise. Later, the blender mixes them into a smoothie. In Series 2 Episode 6, the remote helped them get their revenge on the blender.
- Laser Mouse – A short-tempered computer mouse moves around by shooting a laser beam in front of himself and following it. He comes across an object he cannot get through due to only being able to move in straight lines, so he uses the laser to make a doorway. This usually causes whatever he burned through to cave in on top of him.
- Zip Face and Pencil – A cheeky pencil escapes from his pencil case, who wakes up and tries to recapture him. The pencil, however, uses a sketchbook to draw pictures that come to life.
- Egg Scramblers – A trio of motor biking eggs attempt daredevil stunts. However, one of the eggs has training wheels on his bike, and usually destroys the bike.
- The Cheeky Carrots and Torch – A torch tries to get some sleep in a basement, but whenever his light is off, a band of nocturnal carrots get up to mischief in the darkness, until the torch puts them straight.
- Sugar Cube – A small sugar cube goes sledging with husky dog tea bags, until she becomes knocked off her "sledge" (a spoon) and winds up coming into contact with water where she melts, much to her dogs' displeasure.
- Strictly Come Grating – Similar to "Strictly Come Dancing", a male grater dances with various female contestants (a carrot, an orange, a corn on the cob) until the female dancers are accidentally grated by their partner.
- Alarming Clock – An alarm clock disturbs a sleeping OOglie by her noisy ring, which usually backfires on the clock herself as the disturbed OOglie wakes up and gets their own back.
- Christmas Party Box Gang – A group of Christmas decorations play a game of musical chairs in their box. When one decoration is left out, it finds a way to acquire a chair from another competitor. In the final episode, the chairs come out from under them and do the conga around them.
- Grumpy Basketball and Bouncy Ball – A green ball is constantly annoying a red basketball. Usually, the red ball finds a way to stop the green ball.
- Bonkers Conkers – A pair of conkers attempt to knock the others off its end of rope, resorting to armour and ray guns.
- The Inquisitive Mushrooms – A tray of mushrooms come across strange and interesting items for them to show to each other.
- Frantic Fan – A large revolving fan, who is normally reading a book, gets annoyed by various OOglies even smaller fans whom he tries to blow away.
- DIY Doughnuts – Two doughnuts (one sugar-covered, the other pink) are builders given orders by their Foreman (a larger chocolate doughnut) for various jobs. The two doughnuts making a mess, and the Foreman's anger usually causes him to get involved in the mess as well.
- Meatball and the Pasta Olympics – A small meatball tries to overcome her fears when participating in a parody of the Olympics, often smashing herself or someone else.
- Two pineapple rings try to wake up their "dad" – a whole pineapple – with various loud devices, which usually backfire on the two rings, leaving the pineapple to sleep.
- A Spanish cactus tries to avoid fragile OOglies (such as a balloon or dartboard), but always looses her spines when given a nasty shock, bursting the former OOglie.
- A high-speed strip marker races around the household, leaving behind his long yellow trail of sticky tape. At one point, he runs out of tape and gets a much bigger roll.
- A pepper shaker villain runs around spraying pepper on various OOglies, but is later met with explosive sneezes.
- Rubber's Got Talent – A group of rubber contestants try to dazzle the judges (a crayon, a pair of scissors, and a calculator) with stunts. It is only when they botch up their stunts that they actually impress the judges.
- Strong Man Monkey Nut – A crazed peanut attempts at lifting various heavy objects, but only results in crashing his shell and allowing the smaller nuts inside to escape. In the penultimate episode, he finally manages to lift a sledgehammer without breaking himself, but it still falls onto him.
- Mr. Magnetic – A magnet with sunglasses on tries to avoid metal, with little success.
- Whistle and Marshmallows – A busy blue whistle herds its flock of marshmallows, but one pink marshmallow constantly lets the rest of the flock escape its basket.
- Lightbulb Lynne – A lightbulb tries to avoid being broken.
- A piece of cheese begs to be released from a mousetrap. Every time an OOglie helps it, they become trapped. Not long before they realise the cheese has tricked them, the trapped OOglie gets their revenge on it.
- Hungry Hoover – A vacuum cleaner suffers strange indigestion when consuming various objects or other OOglies.
- Pinky Glove – A glove helps out various OOglies around the house.
- A French shoe hunts after a band of socks in order to make a meal out of them.
- Three peas climb up a mountain of mashed potato and slide back down, often getting into trouble along the way.
- Petrified Pud – A nervous wreck of jelly is constantly scared witless by a mischievous pair of chocolate fingers (one milk and one white). In the final episode, he got his revenge on them once and for all.
- Extreme Soap Bars – Two bars of soap (one yellow, the other black) start from the bathroom and skid around in sporty fashion, finishing up from a long jump off the stair banisters.
- A flourish camera takes photos of various OOglies characters, but is left exasperated when they mess up their shoots.
- Sal the Slice – A pizza cutter villain creeps up on his unsuspecting victim before slicing them up – whereupon the new slices come to life and attack him. In the final episode, he meets a larger pizza cutter, which saws off half the table.
- A tape measure tries to see how far he can run around the house, but whenever he recoils his tape, he usually winds in an uncomfortable landing at the end.
- A trio of pound coins cause grief for a credit card whenever she tries to join in their games.
- The Battery Brothers – A pair of AAA batteries use various objects run on batteries to escape a larger 9-volt battery villain.
- Duelling Toothbrushes – An orange manual toothbrush and a blue electric toothbrush fight to win the affection of a set of wind-up teeth.
- Clippy the Barber – An electric barber's razor gives haircuts to various OOglies, only to mess up, resulting in his customer chasing him.
- Choccy Castle – A bag of jelly beans make constant attempts to raid a box of chocolates that antagonises them, with little success. In the final episode, the jelly beans and chocolates end up having a dance together.
- A French Maid Scrubbing Brush deals with some of the messier OOglies by cleaning up after themselves.
- A pair of "rapper" mobile phones cause countless sleepless nights with their night-time malarkey on the desk.
- The Rock Band – A trio of rocks find an object that they use to make music in the garden, but are silenced by an annoyed pine cone.
- The Intrepid Loo Roll – A strip of toilet paper tries to escape the bathroom, but is usually caught by a human and used for cleaning before being flushed down the toilet.
- A tiny ice cube, averse to cold temperatures, escapes to find warmer places to stay, but melts.
- The Farty Pants – A group of pants play games around the house, with a pair of boxers playing with them.
- Action Hero Sock – An adventurous sock tries many attempts to cross a pit full of belt snakes, but always fails.
- A hungry kitchen bin uses lures and objects to trick OOglies into his waiting mouth. However, it backfired with the Lonely Sprout and the Chilly Peppers
- Chilli Peppers – A band of wild chili peppers runs around an OOglie food product and causes them to cook, with a lone chlli following.
- The Makeup Makeover Crew – A group of female makeup assortments give surprise makeovers to various OOglies by their dressing up desk.
- Sneaky Remote Control! – A sly remote control breaks the fourth wall by appearing in front of the various sketches and messing them up by changing the screen's display.
- At the end of each show, a walnut strums a guitar (its base made up of various items) and whistles the OOglies theme as the credits are shown – only to be squashed, smashed, interrupted, etc. This doesn't happen in the final episode (Season 2, Episode 13), where he is joined progressively by the Devious Blender, Sal the Slice, Melonhead, Bouncy Ball and the Playful Grapes in one final performance and a brief farewell to the audience.
- Another common sketch involves household objects freaking out when they change form – such as a telephone ringing, a toilet flushing, a TV changing channels.

== International Broadcast ==
On 6 April 2010, Classic Media acquired worldwide distribution rights to the series.

== DVD release ==
A DVD release of the series containing a select number of episodes was released by Classic Media and Universal Studios Home Entertainment UK in 2010, under license from the BBC.

== Reception ==
The Daily Record called the OOglies a "fast, furious and fun world" that "zips through sketches as the cast of everyday foods and household objects communicate with an array of silly sounds". Andrea Mullaney of The Scotsman wrote, "I can see it gaining some cult status, actually, as it's so weird that any adults who come across it will certainly not forget it. Children, meanwhile, will just enjoy its mixture of repetition, cartoon violence and funny noises." The show won a BAFTA.
