= Sorry, I Didn't Know =

- Title card
- Genre: Panel show
- Created by: Fraser Ayres; Minnie Ayres
- Directed by: Jan Genesis
- Presented by: Jimmy Akingbola; Chizzy Akudolu
- Starring: Chizzy Akudolu; Judi Love; Eddie Kadi; Richard Blackwood
- Country of origin: United Kingdom
- Original language: English
- No. of series: 4
- No. of episodes: 20

Production
- Executive producers: Fraser Ayres; Minnie Ayres; Jimmy Akingbola
- Running time: 30 mins (incl. adverts)
- Production company: TriForce Productions

Original release
- Network: ITV2 (pilot); ITV
- Release: 3 November 2016 – present

Sorry, I Didn't Know is a British panel show broadcast on ITV, in which panelists answer questions about Black history. A pilot aired on ITV2 in 2016 and the first series of four episodes aired in October 2020, as part of Black History Month. The programme is hosted by Jimmy Akingbola and has team captains Chizzy Akudolu and Judi Love. A second series of five episodes began in October 2021. A third series premiered on 2 October 2022, with Akingbola, Akudolu, and new team captain Eddie Kadi.

== Format ==
The host Jimmy Akingbola asks two teams questions relating to Black history. Rounds variously show panelists attempting to finish a famous quote, work out the name of a Black person from yes/no questions, identify whether a fact presented by the other team is true or false, work out who invented particular technologies and when or match descriptions of people to their faces. In the final round, "General 'Tupidness", panelists buzz in to answer trivia questions about Black figures. Different round structures were used in the 2016 pilot.

Akingbola commented that the show inverts the norm of comedy panel shows which have white men as team captains and women or BAME people as "token" panelists.

== Production ==
The series was created by Fraser Ayres and Minnie Ayres. The presenter Jimmy Akingbola served as producer. Akingbola found presenting to be "fun and yet surreal"; his previous background was in acting. The programme is produced by Triforce Productions, which Akingbola and Fraser Ayres co-founded.

In October 2016, it was announced that ITV commissioned a pilot, along with three other programmes featuring BAME comedians, to be aired in the run-up to the November 2016 MOBO Awards, which recognise excellence in black music. The pilot aired on ITV2 on 3 November 2016 at 8:30 p.m. to an estimated 157,000 viewers.

In May 2020, Akingbola noted on Twitter that the show had been rejected by ITV, the BBC, Channel 4, Channel 5 and Sky UK. He said that the production company was now looking to get the show commissioned in the United States. In July 2020, he told Radio Times that the rejections were sometimes without comment, and sometimes described the show as "a bit niche".

The programme was one of four shows commissioned for ITV as part of the 2020 Black History Month, marked in October in the United Kingdom. The others were Alison Hammond: Back To School, Craig & Danny: Funny, Black and on TV and IRL with Team Charlene. ITV additionally ran documentaries and other programmes relating to Black History Month, and a series of "It's all about" idents made by Black artists. Sorry, I Didn't Know was Triforce Productions's first primetime programme, and the first directing credit for Jan Genesis. The first series ran for four episodes.

The show's commissioning followed a resurgence of the Black Lives Matter movement after the May 2020 murder of George Floyd. Akingbola said that he did not think audiences had changed substantially since the pilot in 2016, only that "the need to serve them properly has increased exponentially" as the Black Lives Matter movement brought "a spotlight to the lack of inclusion". He criticized the pigeonholing of the programme as a "black show", aiming to disprove that "that black content does not appeal to mainstream audiences". Akingbola said that he hoped to see "non-tokenised shows throughout the year" in future. He said that the crew would "love to have the opportunity" to be renewed for a second series and that the programme "wasn't made just for October".

In June 2021, ITV announced that it had renewed the series for another five episodes, which aired the same October.

A third series of five episodes was filmed at the Riverside Studios in Hammersmith, west London, in June 2022 and broadcast in October of the same year. Akingbola and team captain Chizzy Akudolu returned. Guests include White Yardie, Shaun Wallace, Russell Kane and Verona Rose.

In June 2023, ITV commissioned the programme for a fourth series. It was filmed in July for a November premiere, marking the first time the series fell outside ITV's Black History Month schedule.

== Episodes ==
=== Pilot (2016) ===
The pilot was presented by Jimmy Akingbola, with team captains Chizzy Akudolu and Jo Martin. It aired on ITV2 in the timeslot of 8:30 p.m. on Thursday under the title I'm Sorry, I Didn't Know.

No. overall	No. in series	Chizzy's Team	Jo's Team	Scores	Original release date
1	1	Jimmy James Jones and Paul Chowdhry	Judi Love and Toby Williams	45–35	3 November 2016

=== Series 1 (2020) ===
The first series of four episodes premiered during Black History Month. It aired on ITV on Tuesdays at 10:45 p.m. The host was Jimmy Akingbola and Chizzy Akudolu and Judi Love served as team captains.

No. overall	No. in series	Chizzy's Team	Judi's Team	Winning team	Original release date
2	1	Paul Chowdhry and Colin Salmon	Angie Le Mar and Tom Allen	Draw	6 October 2020
3	2	Nathan Caton and AJ Odudu	Russell Kane and Verona Rose	Judi	13 October 2020
4	3	Humza Arshad and Kerry Godliman	Kojo Anim and Jimmy James Jones	Draw	20 October 2020
5	4	Sophie Duker and Toby Williams	Shaun Wallace and Paul Chowdhry	Judi	27 October 2020

=== Series 2 (2021) ===
As with the first series, the second aired on ITV during Black History Month with Akingbola as presenter and Akudolu and Love as team captains. It was moved to the timeslot of 10:20 p.m. on Sunday.

No. overall	No. in series	Chizzy's Team	Judi's Team	Winning team	Original release date
6	1	Russell Kane and Reginald D. Hunter	Fatiha El-Ghorri and Dane Baptiste	Judi	3 October 2021
7	2	Stephen K. Amos and Bethany Black	Eddie Kadi and Kojo Anim	Judi	10 October 2021
8	3	Curtis Walker and Humza Arshad	Sikisa and James Acaster	Chizzy	17 October 2021
9	4	Shazia Mirza and Kemah Bob	Sara Pascoe and Verona Rose	Chizzy	24 October 2021
10	5	Miles Jupp and Paul Chowdhry	Sukh Ojla and Tom Moutchi	Judi	31 October 2021

=== Series 3 (2022) ===
The third series aired during Black History Month with Akingbola as presenter and Akudolu and Kadi as team captains.

No. overall	No. in series	Chizzy's Team	Kadi's Team	Winning team	Original release date
11	1	White Yardie and Athena Kugblenu	Babatunde Aleshe and Verona Rose	Eddie	2 October 2022
12	2	Emmanuel Sonubi and Shazia Mirza	Suzi Ruffell and Colin Jackson	Eddie	9 October 2022
13	3	Zoe Lyons and Judith Jacob	Ken Cheng and Dane Baptiste	Chizzy	16 October 2022
14	4	Shaun Wallace and Yuriko Kotani	Jack Barry and Variety D	Chizzy	23 October 2022
15	5	Kae Kurd and Seann Walsh	Jamelia and Lateef Lovejoy	Eddie	30 October 2022

=== Series 4 (2023) ===
Akingbola, Akudolu and Kadi continued their roles as presenter and team captains, respectively. The series aired in a Sunday 11:05 p.m. timeslot.

No. overall	No. in series	Chizzy's Team	Kadi's Team	Winning team	Original release date
16	1	TBA	TBA	TBA	19 November 2023
17	2	TBA	TBA	TBA	26 November 2023
18	3	TBA	TBA	TBA	3 December 2023
19	4	TBA	TBA	TBA	10 December 2023
20	5	TBA	TBA	TBA	17 December 2023

== Reception ==
Steve Bennett of the website Chortle reviewed the 2016 pilot positively, writing that Akingbola has an "innate authority", and the panelists "deliver as dependably and flippantly as any of the big panel shows". Bennett described the questions as "at the smart end of the spectrum" for panel shows, and found the programme "informative". Following the pilot, the programme was nominated for a 2017 Creative Diversity Network Award for Outstanding Entertainment Programme; the judges called it "distinctive" and "bold", praising it for "breaking open general assumptions around casting as well as content", though the award was given to The Last Leg.
