= Mission: 2110 =

- Genre: Children's game show
- Directed by: James Morgan
- Starring: Stuart Goldsmith; Lindsay Duncan
- Country of origin: United Kingdom
- Original language: English
- No. of series: 2
- No. of episodes: 26

Production
- Producer: Nick Hopkin
- Production company: BBC Scotland

Original release
- Network: CBBC
- Release: 3 May – 18 December 2010

Related
- Raven (2002–2010)

Mission: 2110 is a UK sci-fi themed TV game show for children, starring Stuart Goldsmith and Lindsay Duncan. The first series aired on CBBC during summer 2010 with the second series running October–December of the same year. The show is set in the year 2110, where mankind is all but extinct and earth has been taken over by an armada of robots known as the Roboidz. Caleb (Stuart Goldsmith), the last human alive, enlists the help of children from 100 years ago to help fight back against the Roboidz. The recruits compete in various physical and mental challenges and the winner is declared the Ultimate Recruit.

== Setting ==
In 2030, scientists Laura Gant and Simon Lansing created the Roboidz – robot machines intended for the benefit of mankind, both on earth and beyond. However, the Roboidz eventually turned against their creators after a revolt in Gamma FI4, led by an advanced Roboid called Arkon, and they returned to Earth with the intent of destroying mankind. In the resulting war of 2067, mankind was all but wiped out after an army of a million human soldiers all fell in battle. In the year 2110, Caleb (as far as he knows) is the only survivor of the war and the last human alive. He is part human, part machine, and has no memory of his past life, having been cryogenically frozen many years ago. He is the only hope for humanity so he enlists the help of young recruits from 100 years in the past (2010) via a time machine, training them to battle the Roboidz and become the ultimate recruit to help rid the world of the Roboidz and their leader Neuros.

Along the way, Caleb attempts find out about his past, the origins of the Roboidz, and also desperately tries to make contact with any potential fellow survivors of the war. He often consults his only other ally Cybele, an AI that knows about some of Caleb's past and the Roboidz, for answers, with Cybele often having to tell Caleb to instead focus on his mission. It's eventually revealed that Cybele is the consciousness of Laura Gant, Caleb's mother and co-creator of the Robiodz, and it's heavily hinted that Neuros is the brain of Laura, thus also being Caleb's mother.

At the end of series 1, Caleb seemingly succeeds in stopping the Roboidz by defeating Arkon, but it's shown post-credits that he survived and re-powered up the Roboidz. The series 2 finale had Caleb come face to face with Neuros for the first time. Enraged over her suggestion that she is his true mother, Caleb smashes her on the ground, seemingly killing her, though the post-credit sequence suggested that she may be still alive.

== Format ==
The episodes all have the same format. The same group of recruits are present for three episodes, during which they are gradually reduced to one. The same challenges are undertaken by all 16 recruits.

- Day 1 – The four recruits are introduced. They all take on four challenges, two played individually and two played as pairs to try to gain as many bio-rods as they can.
- Day 2 – The four recruits undertake harder challenges as they try to progress. The final challenge of the day is called 'The Vaporiser', located in V-Lab, and whoever gained the most bio-rods is exempt from the challenge. The remaining three take part where the losing recruit is vaporised and therefore removed. The remaining three recruits continue to the next day.
- Day 3 – The remaining three recruits now undertake even tougher challenges. Only one recruit can continue to the final mission. Numbers of bio rods are also re-set from the previous days totals to give everyone an equal chance of progressing to the next stage of the contest. The three of them face The Vaporiser again, and the recruit that reaches the centre first moves onto the final mission.

When the four elite recruits have been found they undertake four more harder and different challenges across just one day. After the second and third challenges, two recruits are transported home. The remaining two recruits then face the final challenge in N-Lab, 'The Neuros Web'. Whoever wins the challenge is the crowned the ultimate recruit while the loser is vaporised. The ultimate recruit is then transported home.

== Characters ==
- Caleb Lansing-Gant (Stuart Goldsmith) – Part human, part machine, Caleb is (as far as he knows) the last remaining human on earth. It's later revealed that he is the son of Laura Gant and Simon Lansing, the creators of the Roboidz. He caught an unknown disease at the age of 17 and fell very ill. After his parents gave up on any hope of finding a cure, they cryogenically froze him. After waking up, Caleb has no recollection of his previous life.
- Cybele (Lindsay Duncan) – An AI that knows Caleb and about his past, and is Caleb's only ally apart from recruits. It's revealed in series 2 that Cybele is the consciousness of Laura Gant, Caleb's mother that died many years ago from the same unknown disease that Caleb caught.
- Neuros (Lindsay Duncan) – The main computer system controlling all the Roboidz, who takes the appearance of a brain in a bio-rod-like container. In the series 2 finale, it's heavily hinted that she is the brain of Laura, thus also being Caleb's mother.
- Roboidz (voiced by Gareth Jones, Rich Garraghty & Noel Byrne) – The Roboidz are robots that were originally created by Laura Gant and Simon Lansing to aid humanity. But, due to a revolt on Gamma FI4, turned against their creators and all but destroyed mankind. They come in different classes, each a different colour and wielding different weaponry:
  - Guard (Commander Class) – They are silver in colour and, although they have no visual ability, have the latest radar tech. They are also the most intelligent of the Roboidz and armed with multi-digit claws which are more powerful than steel and can be fatal to a recruit
  - Worker (Drone Class) – They are yellow with black stripes and do all the menial jobs around Future Gate, armed with the strength of ten men and pincer claws which can destroy anything, particularly Caleb's recruits. Luckily for the recruits, they are the least intelligent of the Roboidz.
  - Wardroid (Battle Class) – They are red in colour and are the police force of Future Gate, armed with military training, a vector-beam rifle, and boxing glove-like rip claws. Despite being the most dangerous of the Roboidz, as Caleb describes them, they are "pretty stupid."
- Arkon (Peter Dickson) – Led all the Roboidz to earth after the Gamma FI4 revolt and seemingly died at the end of series 1, but was shown to be alive as he powered up all the Roboidz again (including himself and Neuros). Unlike the other Roboidz, he has blue eye lights, a blue colour scheme, and the ability of speech.
- Shades (voiced by Gareth Jones, Rich Garraghty & Noel Byrne) – Former humans that were captured and converted into foul-smelling, inhuman slaves to carry out the Roboidz commands.
- Recruits – Children who are brought onto Future Gate to battle the Roboidz. After each episode they are either transported home or vaporised somewhere – Caleb and the remaining recruits don't know where.

== Award nominations ==
In August 2010, Mission: 2110 was nominated for a Royal Television Society award for special effects, but lost to Misfits.
