= Peter Dickson (announcer) =

Northern Irish voice-over artist

- Born: Peter Dickson; Knock, Belfast, United Kingdom
- Occupation: Voiceover artist
- Known for: Britain's Got Talent; The X Factor; E4

Peter Dickson is a Northern Irish announcer. After spending a period working on hospital radio, he became a newsreader at BBC Northern Ireland and worked for Good Morning Ulster. After tiring of covering The Troubles, he moved to BBC Radio 2 in London, spending ten years there before going freelance. He has announced for the channel E4 and for various talent shows including The X Factor.

== Life and career ==
Peter Dickson was born in Knock, Belfast, to a father who had a clerical job at Harland & Wolff and a mother; he attended Belfast Royal Academy, where he sat A-levels in geology, physics, and geography. He moved to Queen's University Belfast in 1975, where he met his future wife; he graduated in 1979, having written his thesis on childhood memory development. He spent a period working as a porter at the Stormont Hotel in Belfast and then time broadcasting on hospital radio.

Dickson became a newsreader at BBC Northern Ireland, where he worked on Good Morning Ulster. Several sources claim that he was the youngest newsreader ever and that he got the job aged 17; however, he has stated that he got the job while studying at university. His first job at BBC Northern Ireland was reading fatstock prices to farmers at 6 a.m.; a subsequent job there entailed breaking the news of the assassination of Lord Mountbatten. After tiring of reporting on The Troubles, he moved to BBC Radio 2 in London in 1982, where he worked with Terry Wogan and presented the comedy series Peter Dickson's Nightcap, which ran for four years.

In 1991, Dickson moved next to a house next to Chequers, where his neighbours have included Prime Ministers of the United Kingdom. Around the time he moved in, he launched Melody 105.4 FM, on which he presented the breakfast show for four years. After leaving the BBC in 1992 to go freelance, he appeared in Harry Enfield & Chums. Dickson began his voiceover career after providing voices for Steve Wright's radio show, for which he would create characters, and was subsequently hired for Bruce Forsyth's version of The Price Is Right. By 2003, he had developed the nickname "Peter Diction" for his careful enunciation.

Dickson began providing a voiceover for The X Factor in 2004, where his job was to introduce the contestants to the stage and to shout "It's time to face the music". He has stated that he got the job after a sound supervisor on Test the Nation suggested that he audition. His pronunciation of the name of one series six contestant, Rachel Adedeji, became especially popular. Multiple sources describe his voiceover as "bombastic", with The Independent additionally writing in July 2015 that Dickson's voiceover was integral to the series' success and that his "over-enunciation of commonplace syllables lent the show a pomp and pageantry which it could never have earned otherwise".

Dickson took over the voiceover for E4 in 2006 following the death of Patrick Allen. Two years later, he narrated The Mental Spa, a podcast presented by Emma Clarke and Dan Whittaker, and Britain's Got the Pop Factor... and Possibly a New Celebrity Jesus Christ Soapstar Superstar Strictly on Ice, a parody of talent shows such as The X Factor. He stated in his 2020 autobiography Voiceover Man that The X Factor's creator Simon Cowell had been initially annoyed by Dickson's involvement in the latter but cooled after seeing how popular the show was with viewers. As a member of Peter Dickson & The Shakettes, he released the August 2010 single "Shake It", a promotional vehicle for the milkshake bar Shakeaway.

In 2011, Dickson provided the voiceover for a Staffordshire University student's master's dissertation on the requirements of successful comedians and his own app, Peter Dickson's Pocket Announcer. Around this time, he was seeking employment as an announcer for movie trailers in Los Angeles. In 2013, after tiring of people asking him how to enter the voiceover industry, he and his friend Hugh Edwards co-founded Gravy for the Brain, a training academy based in Banbury. The following year, Dickson produced a relaxation tape for use in a Buttery Brown Monk sketch and appeared on the BBC One Northern Ireland panel show Monumental.

By July 2015, Dickson's voice had become synonymous with The X Factor and he had announced Britain's Got Talent, Family Fortunes, All Star Mr & Mrs, and Live at the Apollo. He left The X Factor that month but returned for that year's live finals, leaving the previous week's Judges' Houses for Redd Pepper. In 2017, he played a disgruntled phone-in caller on John Cleese Presents...; by April 2018, he had narrated 100 television shows and 30,000 adverts. His voice has been mimicked by impressionists including Britain's Got Talent contestants and Joe Lycett.

== Works ==
=== Filmography ===
Year	Series	Episode(s)	Role	Ref
1994	Harry Enfield & Chums	Episodes 2 and 5	Ensemble actor	
1995	The Smell of Reeves and Mortimer	Episodes 1 and 3	Announcer	
1995–2007	The Price Is Right		Announcer	
1995	Quote... Unquote	Series 19	Reader	
1995–2006	They Think It's All Over		Announcer	
1996–97	Tellystack		Announcer	
1997	Last Chance Lottery		Announcer	
2000–02; 2007–2015	Family Fortunes, All Star Family Fortunes		Announcer	
2001	It's Not the Answer		Announcer	
2002	Catchphrase		Announcer	
2002–06	Test the Nation	15 episodes	Announcer	
2003	Monkey Dust		Various (voice)	
2004–06	The Department	Series 1–3	Ensemble actor	
2004–14, 2015–19	The X Factor		Announcer	
2005	The Big Call		Announcer	
2005	Hit Me, Baby, One More Time		Announcer	
2005–07	Gameshow Marathon		Announcer	
2006	Not Today, Thank You		Ensemble actor	
2006	Soapstar Superstar		Announcer	
2007	Hedz	Series 1	Various (voice)	
2007–16, 2018–present	Live at the Apollo	Series 3–12, 14–present	Announcer	
2007–present	Britain's Got Talent	Series 1–present	Announcer	
2007	Soapstar Superchef		Announcer	
2008–16	All Star Mr & Mrs		Announcer	
2008	Britain's Got the Pop Factor...		Announcer	
2008	Alan Carr's Celebrity Ding Dong	Series 2	Announcer	
2008	Hole in the Wall	Series 1	Announcer	
2009	No Signal!		Various	
2009–11	Chris Moyles' Quiz Night	Five series	Announcer	
2009–11	Michael McIntyre's Comedy Roadshow		Announcer	
2009	Harry Hill's TV Burp	Series 9, episodes 9 and 11–14; series 10, episodes 4–8	Announcer	
2010–16	Channel 4's Comedy Gala		Announcer	
2010–14	Edinburgh Comedy Fest Live		Announcer	
2010	The King Is Dead		Announcer	
2010–14	Comedy Central at the Comedy Store	Series 1 and 3	Announcer	
2010	Celebrity Juice	Series 4, episode 8 and "The Best Bits"	Self	
2010	Magic Numbers		Announcer	
2010	Mission: 2110		Announcer	
2012	Alan Carr: Chatty Man	"Alan Carr's Summertime Specstacular"	Announcer	
2013	Births, Deaths, and Marriages	Series 2, episode 2	Peter	
2013	Funny Old Year	Series 2	Announcer	
2014	Monumental	Series 2, episode 1	Self	
2017	John Cleese Presents...		Ensemble actor	
2017	Pointless Celebrities	Series 10, episode 31	Self	
2018	Obsessions	Series 1, episode 4	Self	
2020	Isolation Song Contest		Announcer	
2025	Michael McIntyre's Big Show	Series 8, episode 6	Self	

=== Singles ===
Year	Title	Credit	Ref
2009	"What a Bunch of Bankers"	Voiceoverman & The Credit Crunchers	
2010	"Shake It"	Peter Dickson & The Shakettes	

=== Bibliography ===
- Dickson, Peter (2020). Voiceover Man – The Extraordinary Story of a Professional Voice Actor. Provox Publishing. ISBN 978-1838159702.
