= Toby Williams (comedian) =

British actor, writer and comedian

Toby Williams is a British actor, writer and stand-up comedian performing both as himself and Dr George Ryegold. He is known for a number of appearances on television including regular or recurring roles on Vanity Fair, Porters and Sex Education.

== Career ==
Toby Williams and directing duo Big Red Button were named winners in the Best Video & Film: Weird category at the 29th Annual Webby Awards in New York City on 12th May 2025 for their short film Wet Fish, which Williams co-wrote and performed in. In 2023 he was part of the team that won the BBC Audio Award for Best Scripted Comedy (Sketch Show) as a co-writer and performer on BBC Radio 4's Please Use Other Door.

His stand-up accolades include Dave's 'Top 10 Funniest Jokes of the Fringe' 2012, winner of 'Best Show' at The Leicester Comedy Festival 2011, winner of a Three Weeks Editors' Award at the Edinburgh Festival Fringe 2011 (for 'The Fudge Shop') and a nomination for 'The Malcolm Hardee Award for Comic Originality' for his debut Edinburgh 2009 show as George Ryegold, 'Trample The Weak, Hurdle The Dead'.

He appears in the movies High-Rise, Paddington and The Drowning of Arthur Braxton. He has appeared in Holby City (BBC 1), Morgana Robinson's The Agency (BBC 2) and in the sitcoms Bull (UKTV GOLD), Raised By Wolves (Channel 4), Trying Again (Sky Living), Carters Get Rich (Sky 1) and Benidorm (ITV). He appears in Island Queen – nominated for the BAFTA Award for Best Short Film – and is known as the voice of Rumple the Rhino in Iconicles (CBeebies). He also appears in the popular Specsavers TV commercial as the short-sighted vet.

In 2019 he appeared as Tim in the second episode of Sex Education (Netflix), reprising the role in the second series in 2020.

Also in 2019 he appeared as 'Doctor' Davey Scholes in an episode of Doctors (BBC1), and Colin in Eastenders (BBC1), a man delivering a gazebo to Jean Slater (Gillian Wright) at the caravan park where she is staying, who is convinced by Stacey Fowler (Lacey Turner) and Martin Fowler (James Bye) to let their daughter Lily Fowler (Aine Garvey) hide in the gazebo box to gain entry to Jean's caravan. He also reprised the role of Terry Grimm in Series 2 of Porters (Dave) whom he originally portrayed in Series 1.

Williams appeared as a panellist on the 2016 pilot episode of ITV show Sorry, I Didn't Know, presented by Jimmy Akingbola, returning for the series in October 2020.

== Filmography ==
Year	Title	Role	Notes
2000	Martian Gothic: Unification	Additional Voices	Video game, voice
2006	The Ship		Video game, voice
2007	Rocket Science!	Jack Hersey	Short film
2009	IL-2 Sturmovik: Birds of Prey	English Voice, American Voices, Russian Voices	Video game, voice
2010	Grime City P.D.	Jack Hersey	Short film
2011	Iconicles	Rumple the Rhino	Recurring role
2012	Celebrity Bedlam	Fame Simulator Roadie	Episode: "Fame"
2012	Step Right Up	Alex the Clown	Short film
2012	Island Queen	Fisherman	Short film
2013	The Day They Came to Suck Out Our Brains!	Snake Charmer / Assorted Characters	Web series, 3 episodes
2013	Battlecock!	Timothy Dukinson	Short film
2013	Saving Santa	Nutcracker	Voice
2014	Trying Again	Shopkeeper	1 episode
2014	Paddington	Geographer (Present Day)	
2014	Agatha Raisin	Postman	Episode: "The Quiche of Death"
2014	Games Night	Steve	TV movie
2015	Moody Good: Musicbx (Feat. Eryn Allen Kane)	The Addict	Music video
2015	Milk!	Timothy Dukinson	Short film
2015	High-Rise	Bobby	
2015	Bull	Desmond	Episode: "A Faberge Egg (1905)"
2015	S-Band	Mr. Barrett	TV Short
2015	Guy and Doll		Short film
2016-2020	Sorry, I Didn't Know	Panellist	2 episodes
2016	Raised by Wolves	Headmaster	Episode: "The Old School"
2016	Holby City	Richard 'Dickie' Bliss	Episode: "It Tolls for Thee"
2016	Jack and Dean of All Trades	Bank Manager	Episode: "Baking Bad"
2016	Morgana Robinson's the Agency	Planning Officer	1 episode
2016	The Baby's Crying	Father	Short film
2016	Elderflower	Patrick	Short film
2017-2019	Porters	Terry Grimm	2 episodes
2017	Benidorm	Wolfgang	1 episode
2017	Carters Get Rich	Mr. Summers	Episode: "The Launch"
2017	The Current War	Fort Worth Investment Banker	
2017	ManDate	Matt	Short film
2018	Unspun with Matt Forde	Jonny - Department for Brexit	Episode: "Lord Andrew Adonis"
2018	Damned	Dentist	1 episode
2018	There Are No Dividends	Darren Hobbs	Short film
2018	In the Long Run	Coach	1 episode
2018	Urban Myths	Mike	Episode: "Johnny Cash and the Ostrich"
2018	Vanity Fair	Hicks	5 episodes
2019-2020	Sex Education	Tim	2 episodes
2019	Total War: Warhammer II	Ikit Claw	Video game - The Prophet & The Warlock DLC
2019	Doctors	'Doctor' Davey Scholes	Episode: "Magic Bus"
2019	EastEnders	Colin	1 episode
2019	Britannia	The Innkeeper	1 episode
2019	The Mallorca Files	Mike Fowler	Episode: "Mallorca's Most Wanted"
2020	Don't Walk	John	Short film
2020	Assassin's Creed Valhalla	Eadred / The Ash-Spear (Gifle) / Reeve Derby	Video game, voice
2021	Dreaming Whilst Black	Tom	Television pilot
2021	Please Help	Eddie	Television pilot
2021	The Drowning of Arthur Braxton	Mr. Worrell	
2021	The Emily Atack Show	Various	2 episodes
2022	Babylon's Fall	Galenos / Background Voices	Video game, voice
2022	Breeders	Pharmacist 1	1 episode
2023	Django	Walter Breaver	1 episode
2023	Lord of the Rings: Return to Moria	Bolgagk / Troll King / Gundabad Orc / Red Eye Uruk / Goblin / Red Eye Orc / Deep Orc	Video Game
2023	Borrowed Time	Shane Woodley	Short film
2023	Andy and the Band	Farmer McFellows	Episode: "Ninja Pig"
2023	Immune	Philip	Short film
2024	Father Brown	Dr. Geoffrey Fleming	Episode: "The Kembleston Olimpicks"
2024	We Are Lady Parts	Dr. Saunders	Episode: "Villain Era"
2026	Pressure	Bryant	
2026	Death in Paradise	Giles Parry	Series 15, Episode 8
