= City Spectacular =

Street performance competition in Ireland

The Laya Healthcare City Spectacular (formerly Street Performance World Championship) is an annual street performance competition, jointly hosted by Cork and Dublin in Ireland.

== History ==
=== Street Performance World Championship ===
The City Spectacular opened in 2006 and takes place over three days in mid-June.

Organized by Mark Duckenfield and Conor McCarthy, who started Emergent Events to organize this festival. Starting with an initial crowd of over 26,000 in 2006, and 40,000 in 2007, the growing crowds can consider this a runaway success.

In 2011 the event went through some unexpected changes when its main sponsor terminated their contract leaving the festival organisers with nowhere near the funding needed to run the event. To raise the money needed the organisers decided on a World Record Attempt and set off to gather the world's largest collection of real life Where's Wallys (AKA Where's Waldo). The money needed for the event would be raised through costume sales from stalls all over the park with a large percentage of the money raised going to Africa Aware. Over many weeks prior to the event there were various promotions for the world record attempt including a flash mob in the Dublin City Centre and news paper publications along with a huge amount of networking on Facebook and Twitter. On the weekend of June 18 and 19 the world Record was broken outside Merrion Square in Dublin City with a staggering amount of "Wally's" big and small gathered on Merrion Square West. The same record was attempted in both Cork City and Portlaoise on June 12 but partially due to heavy rain neither managed to accumulate the same numbers as their Dublin counterparts.

==== Winners ====
- 2006: Space Cowboy (Australian Circus and Freak show performer)
- 2007: Space Cowboy (Australian Circus and Freak show performer)
- 2008: English Gents
- 2009: USA Breakdancers
- 2010: Jack Wise
- 2011: Space Cowboy (Australian Circus and Freak show performer)

=== Laya Healthcare Street Performance World Championship ===
Since 2012, Laya Healthcare has sponsored the City Spectacular. The competition is free to attend and runs for three days. Performers from all over the world travel to Ireland to compete for the coveted title of The laya healthcare Street Performance World Champion.

The Competition has grown to become a hugely celebrated event for the people of Dublin, Portlaoise and Cork City. Families from all over Ireland attend the event every year for its death defying performers, balloon artists, food venders and art installations. It is run entirely by local volunteers.
