= List of QI panellists =

This is a list of the panellists that have appeared on the BBC television programme QI. The show premiered in September 2003, with Stephen Fry as its host. Fry continued hosting until March 2016, when "Series M" concluded and Sandi Toksvig took over. With very few exceptions, each episode features three guest panellists who alongside permanent panellist Alan Davies answer extremely obscure questions. Series X (QI's 24th) was filmed in early 2026, and broadcast on BBC Two from 3 November 2026.

As of 3 November 2026, 337 episodes of QI have aired.

== Number of appearances per guest panellist ==
The table below lists all guest appearances up to 10 November 2026. It does not include appearances in the unbroadcast pilot, three special episodes, 34 compilation episodes, and one episode containing outtakes from Series E.

Name	Series																								Total
Name	A	B	C	D	E	F	G	H	I	J	K	L	M	N	O	P	Q	R	S	T	U	V	W	X	Total
Aaron Simmonds																					1				1
Adam Hills												1													1
Ade Adepitan																	1								1
Ahir Shah																			1	1	1	1			4
Aisling Bea												2	2	1	2	2	3	2	1	1	1	1	1		19
Al Murray									1																1
Alan Carr																	1								1
Alex Brooker																							1		1
Alex Edelman																					1				1
Alexander Armstrong			1																						1
Alice Levine															1	1	1		1						4
Andrew Maxwell																	1						1		2
Andy Hamilton			2	1		1	1	1	1																7
Andy Parsons				1																					1
Anneka Rice		1																							1
Anuvab Pal																	1								1
Arthur Smith		1	1	1																					3
Barry Cryer		1																							1
Barry Humphries							1																		1
Ben Goldacre									1																1
Ben Miller						1																			1
Benjamin Zephaniah																		1							1
Bill Bailey	3	3	5		4		4	3	3	3	3	3	4		4			3		1	1				47
Bonnie Langford																			1						1
Brendan O'Carroll											1														1
Brian Blessed									1																1
Brian Cox									1	1															2
Bridget Christie																1	1	1	1	1	1				6
Cal Wilson										2															2
Cally Beaton															1	1		1	1	1	1	1	1		8
Cariad Lloyd													2	3	2	2	2		1	1	1	1	1		16
Carrie Fisher												1													1
Catherine Bohart																							1		1
Charlie Higson					1	1																			2
Chris Addison								1	1				1												3
Chris McCausland																		1	1	1	1	1	1		6
Clare Balding								1																	1
Claudia O'Doherty												1													1
Claudia Winkleman															1		1								2
Clive Anderson	2	2	2	2	2	2	2		1					1											16
Colin Lane											1	2		1	2		1								7
Corey Taylor														1											1
Daliso Chaponda																	1	1	1	1	1	1	1		7
Dan Tiernan																					1				1
Daniel Radcliffe								1																	1
Danny Baker	2						1	2		1	1	1				1									9
Danny Bhoy													1												1
Dara Ó Briain		1	1	2	2	1	2	2	2	1															14
Dave Gorman	1								1																2
David Baddiel														1											1
David Mitchell			1	1	2	3	4	3	3	2	2	2	2	1	2		2	1	1		1				33
David O'Doherty										1															1
David Tennant							1																		1
Deborah Frances-White																				1					1
Deirdre O'Kane														1	1										2
Dermot O'Leary													1												1
Desiree Burch															1					1		1	1	1	5
Dom Joly						1																			1
Doon Mackichan			1		1																				2
Ed Balls																1									1
Ed Byrne																1				1		1	1		4
Ed Gamble																		1	1						2
Eddie Izzard								1																	1
Eddie Kadi													1												1
Elis James																							1		1
Ellie Taylor																1									1
Emma Thompson						1																			1
Emmanuel Sonubi																					1	1			2
Eshaan Akbar																		1	1	1	1	1	1		6
Fatiha El-Ghorri																							1		1
Frank Skinner									1			1													2
Frankie Boyle														1											1
Fred MacAulay		1						1																	2
Graeme Garden				1																					1
Graham Linehan											1														1
Graham Norton							1	1																	2
Grayson Perry															1										1
Greg Davies													1												1
Greg Proops										1															1
Griff Rhys Jones																							1		1
Guz Khan																				1	1				2
Gyles Brandreth	1							1						1		1		1	1	1	1	1	1	1	11
Hank Green																							1		1
Hannah Gadsby																1									1
Hannah Waddingham																				1					1
Helen Atkinson-Wood			1																						1
Henning Wehn									1											1					2
Holly Walsh														2	2	2	3	4	1	1	1	1	1		18
Howard Goodall	2																								2
Hugh Dennis						1	1																		2
Hugh Laurie	1																								1
Ignacio Lopez																						1			1
Isy Suttie											1														1
Ivo Graham																			1						1
Jack Carroll																		1							1
Jack Dee							2	2	2											1	1	1			9
Jack Whitehall										1	1	2													4
Jackie Clune	1																								1
Jamali Maddix																			1						1
James Acaster													1				1		1						3
Jamie MacDonald																				1					1
Jan Ravens							1								1										2
Janet Street-Porter											1														1
Jason Manford										2	3	2		2	2	2	2		1	1	1	1			19
Jen Brister																			1						1
Jenny Eclair													1												1
Jeremy Clarkson		1	2	1	2		1	1	1	1	1	1	1	1											14
Jeremy Hardy	3	1																							4
Jerry Springer														1											1
Jessica Fostekew																		1	1						2
Jessica Stevenson				1																					1
Jimmy Carr	1	1	1	2	4	3	3	2	3	2	3	3	2	3	2	2	2		1	1	1	1	1		44
Jo Brand	4	4	2	4	4	3	3	1	2	2	3	2	2	1			1		1	1	1	1	1		43
Joanne McNally																							1		1
Joe Lycett															1	2	2	2	1	1	1	1			11
John Barrowman																		1	1						2
John Bishop									1																1
John Hodgman							1																		1
John Lloyd								1																	1
John Sergeant						1																			1
John Sessions	2	2	2	2		1				1															10
Johnny Vaughan				1																					1
Johnny Vegas					1	1	1	1	1	1	1	1	1	1		1	1	1	1						14
Jonathan Ross				1																					1
Jordan Gray																					1				1
Josh Pugh																					1				1
Josh Widdicombe											1	3	2	1	2	2	2	2	1	1	1	1	1		20
Josie Lawrence		1																							1
Judi Love																					1	1			2
Julia Morris	1																								1
Julia Zemiro										2			1												3
Julian Clary				1						1													1		3
Justin Moorhouse																		1			1				2
Katherine Ryan											1				1										2
Kathy Lette												1													1
Katy Brand										1								1							2
Kemah Bob																					1				1
Kiri Pritchard-McLean																					1	1	1		3
Lara Ricote																					1	1			2
Larry Dean																							1		1
Laura Smyth																						1		1	2
Lee Mack							1	1	2					1		2			1						8
Linda Smith	2	1																							3
Liza Tarbuck				1			1			1	1				1			1							6
Lloyd Langford												1													1
Lolly Adefope														1											1
Lou Sanders																	1	1	1	1	1	1	1		7
Loyiso Gola																	1								1
Lucy Beaumont														1											1
Lucy Porter												1	1	1											3
Lulu																						1			1
Maggie Aderin-Pocock																		1							1
Maisie Adam																		1	1	1	1	1	1		6
Marcus Brigstocke						1					1														2
Mark Gatiss		1																							1
Mark Steel		1	1	1																1					4
Mark Watson																		1	1			1			3
Matt Lucas													2	2	1	1									6
Meera Syal	1																								1
Melanie Bracewell																						1	1		2
Michael Odewale																							1		1
Michelle Wolf																						1			1
Miles Jupp														1											1
Morgana Robinson																					1				1
Nabil Abdulrashid																					1	1	1		3
Neil Delamere																						1			1
Neil Mullarkey				1																					1
Nikki Bedi																1									1
Nina Conti									1																1
Nish Kumar														1	2		2		1	1	1	1	1		10
Noel Fielding											1		2	2	1	2									8
Olga Koch																		1							1
Pam Ayres						1																			1
Patrick Kielty																							1		1
Paul Sinha																1									1
Peter Serafinowicz	1																								1
Phil Kay		2																							2
Phil Wang																1							1		2
Phill Jupitus	1	2	4	5	4	2	3	3	2	2	2	2	2	3	1	3	3	2							46
Prue Leith																	1								1
Rachel Parris																1									1
Reginald D. Hunter						1				1	1														3
Rhod Gilbert													1	1	1	2					1	1			7
Rhys Darby										1															1
Rhys James																						1			1
Ria Lina																				1					1
Rich Hall	3	6	3	2	2	2	2	2	2						1										25
Richard Coles										1	1	1													3
Richard E. Grant	1																								1
Richard Osman											1	1		1	1	1			1	1					7
Rob Beckett																				1		1			2
Rob Brydon	1		1		1	3	4	3		2															15
Robert Webb								1																	1
Roger McGough				1																					1
Roisin Conaty																			1				2		3
Romesh Ranganathan													1	1	2	1					1				6
Ronni Ancona				1		1	1	1	1			1		1											7
Rory Bremner				1																					1
Rory McGrath			2																						2
Rose Matafeo																			1	1					2
Rosie Jones																			1	1	1	1	1		5
Ross Noble								3	3	3	2	2	1	3	1					1		1			20
Ruby Wax								1																	1
Russell Brand															1										1
Russell Kane																							1		1
Sally Phillips															1	1	1	1	1	1	1	1	1		9
Sam Campbell																							1		1
Sami Shah													1												1
Sandi Toksvig							2	3	3	2	3	2	1	(Note: Took over from Stephen Fry as host)											16
Sara Cox													1												1
Sara Pascoe											1	2	1	1	1	2	2	2	1	1	1	1	1		17
Sarah Millican									1	2	1	1	2	1	1		2			1					12
Sean Lock	2	3	3	2	4	3	4	3	3																27
Shappi Khorsandi										1															1
Shazia Mirza																		1							1
Sheila Hancock													1											1	2
Sindhu Vee																1	1		1						3
Stephen K. Amos															1	1	1	1	1						5
Sue Perkins							1	1	2	3	3	2	3												15
Suggs												1													1
Susan Calman										1	1		1	1	1	1	1	3		1		1	1	1	14
Suzi Ruffell																			1	1					2
Teri Hatcher																1									1
Terry Wogan						1																			1
Tim Minchin											1														1
Tim Vine										1															1
Tom Allen																	1	2		1	1	1	1		7
Tom Ward																					1				1
Tommy Tiernan													1												1
Tony Hawks												1													1
Trevor Noah											1														1
Urzila Carlson																					1				1
Vic Reeves				2	2																				4
Victoria Coren Mitchell										1	1	1		1	1	1	1		1		1				9
Victoria Wood											1														1
Zoe Lyons																		2	1	1	1	1	1	1	8
