= Live at the Apollo (TV series) =

British stand-up comedy programme

- Genre: Live comedy
- Presented by: Jack Dee (2004–2007); Guest hosts (2007–present)
- Narrated by: Patrick Allen; Peter Dickson
- Opening theme: "Are You Gonna Be My Girl" by Jet
- Country of origin: United Kingdom
- Original language: English
- No. of series: 20
- No. of episodes: 130

Production
- Executive producers: Addison Cresswell; Andrew Beint; Joe Norris
- Producers: Alex Hardcastle; Anthony Caveney
- Production location: Hammersmith Apollo
- Running time: 30–45 minutes
- Production company: Open Mike Productions

Original release
- Network: BBC One (2004–2015); BBC Two (2015–present)
- Release: 6 September 2004 – present

Related
- Michael McIntyre's Comedy Roadshow

Live at the Apollo (formerly titled Jack Dee Live at the Apollo) is a British stand-up comedy programme performed from the Hammersmith Apollo. The programmes are recorded, not broadcast live, but the acts perform in front of a live audience.

Jack Dee hosted the first two series and the opening show of the third series, performing a short segment before introducing a guest comedian. Until 2015, all episodes were broadcast on BBC One. The show moved to BBC Two in November 2015. The programme was renamed for its third series which was filmed over three evenings in October 2007. The format was changed to have one of the night's performers assuming hosting duties.

A fourth series began transmission on 28 November 2008. It showcased a variety of the newer stand-up comedians and was rescheduled from Monday nights to Friday nights to replace Friday Night with Jonathan Ross following Ross's suspension in the wake of the Sachsgate row. After hosting the first episode, Michael McIntyre was given his own show with a similar format: Michael McIntyre's Comedy Roadshow which was broadcast from 2009 until 2011.

On 29 July 2026, the BBC announced that Live at the Apollo would end after series 21, which would be filmed in the autumn, due to cuts at the broadcaster.

== Episode list ==
Viewing figures from BARB and British Comedy Guide.

Series	Episodes	Originally released		
Series	Episodes	First released	Last released	Network
1	6	6 September 2004	11 October 2004	BBC One
2	6	12 September 2005	17 October 2005	BBC One
3	6	12 November 2007	17 December 2007	BBC One
4	6	28 November 2008	16 January 2009	BBC One
5	6	4 December 2009	1 January 2010	BBC One
6	6	25 November 2010	1 January 2011	BBC One
7	8	4 November 2011	21 January 2012	BBC One
8	6	17 November 2012	4 January 2013	BBC One
9	6	22 November 2013	15 January 2014	BBC One
10	6	19 November 2014	2 January 2015	BBC One
11	7	9 November 2015	20 December 2015	BBC Two
12	7	8 November 2016	20 December 2016	BBC Two
13	7	30 November 2017	4 January 2018	BBC Two
14	7	15 November 2018	22 December 2018	BBC Two
15	7	5 November 2019	17 December 2019	BBC Two
16	7	10 November 2021	15 December 2021	BBC Two
17	7	19 December 2022	10 February 2023	BBC Two
18	7	7 November 2023	18 December 2023	BBC Two
19	7	19 December 2024	4 February 2025	BBC Two
20	7	23 December 2025	3 February 2026	BBC Two
Specials	12	2 June 2018	28 December 2020	BBC Two

=== Series 1 (2004) ===
No.	Host	Comedian	First broadcast	Viewers (millions)
1x01	Jack Dee	Joan Rivers	6 September 2004	—N/a
1x02	Jack Dee	Ardal O'Hanlon	13 September 2004	—N/a
1x03	Jack Dee	Jo Brand	20 September 2004	—N/a
1x04	Jack Dee	Ross Noble	27 September 2004	—N/a
1x05	Jack Dee	Omid Djalili	4 October 2004	—N/a
1x06	Jack Dee	No guest	11 October 2004	—N/a

=== Series 2 (2005) ===
No.	Host	Comedian(s)	First broadcast	Viewers (millions)
2x01	Jack Dee	Lee Mack	12 September 2005	—N/a
2x02	Jack Dee	Dara Ó Briain	19 September 2005	—N/a
2x03	Jack Dee	No guest	26 September 2005	—N/a
2x04	Jack Dee	Rob Brydon (in character as Keith Barret)	3 October 2005	—N/a
2x05	Jack Dee	Marcus Brigstocke and Rich Hall	10 October 2005	—N/a
2x06	Jack Dee	Julian Clary	17 October 2005	—N/a

=== Series 3 (2007) ===
No.	Host	Comedian(s)	First broadcast	Viewers (millions)
3x01	Jack Dee	Jason Manford and Russell Howard	12 November 2007	—N/a
3x02	Jimmy Carr	Alan Carr	19 November 2007	—N/a
3x03	Jo Brand	Michael McIntyre	26 November 2007	—N/a
3x04	Lee Mack	Sean Lock	3 December 2007	—N/a
3x05	Joan Rivers	Patrick Kielty	10 December 2007	—N/a
3x06	Dara Ó Briain	Stephen K. Amos and Frankie Boyle	17 December 2007	—N/a

=== Series 4 (2008–2009) ===
No.	Host	Comedian(s)	First broadcast	Viewers (millions)
4x01	Michael McIntyre	Rich Hall and Rhod Gilbert	28 November 2008	—N/a
4x02	Al Murray (in character as The Pub Landlord)	Shappi Khorsandi and Russell Kane	5 December 2008	—N/a
4x03	Sean Lock	Jason Manford	12 December 2008	—N/a
4x04	Dara Ó Briain	Frankie Boyle	19 December 2008	—N/a
4x05	Lenny Henry	Andy Parsons and Ed Byrne	9 January 2009	—N/a
4x06	Russell Howard	Jo Brand	17 January 2009	—N/a

=== Series 5 (2009–2010) ===
No.	Host	Comedian(s)	First broadcast	Viewers (millions)
5x01	Jason Manford	Michael McIntyre	4 December 2009	4.20
5x02	Rob Brydon	Sarah Millican and Jason Byrne	11 December 2009	4.82
5x03	Al Murray (in character as The Pub Landlord)	Chris Addison and Tim Vine	18 December 2009	4.66
5x04	Rhod Gilbert	John Bishop	19 December 2009	6.29
5x05	Ed Byrne	Adam Hills and Gina Yashere	24 December 2009	4.07
5x06	Alistair McGowan	Kevin Bridges and Reginald D. Hunter	1 January 2010	3.77

=== Series 6 (2010–2011) ===
No.	Host	Comedian(s)	First broadcast	Viewers (millions)
6x01	Sean Lock	John Bishop	25 November 2010	3.81
6x02	Lee Mack	Rich Hall and Danny Bhoy	2 December 2010	3.86
6x03	Dara Ó Briain	Greg Davies and Stewart Francis	9 December 2010	4.67
6x04	Kevin Bridges	Shappi Khorsandi and Jack Whitehall	17 December 2010	4.89
6x05	Stephen K. Amos	Jon Richardson and Micky Flanagan	28 December 2010	—N/a
6x06	Lenny Henry	Mike Wilmot and Tommy Tiernan	1 January 2011	4.26

=== Series 7 (2011–2012) ===
No.	Host	Comedian(s)	First broadcast	Viewers (millions)
7x01	Micky Flanagan	Seann Walsh and Jason Byrne	4 November 2011	3.02
7x02	Sean Lock	Ed Byrne and Lee Nelson	11 November 2011	3.21
7x03	Alan Carr	Andi Osho and Patrick Kielty	25 November 2011	2.68
7x04	Andy Parsons	Andrew Lawrence and Milton Jones	2 December 2011	3.22
7x05	Rich Hall	Mark Watson and Andrew Maxwell	9 December 2011	3.38
7x06	Sarah Millican	Steve Hughes and Russell Kane	16 December 2011	3.63
7x07	Jason Manford	Jimeoin and Tom Stade	14 January 2012	3.64
7x08	Jack Whitehall	Josh Widdicombe and Shappi Khorsandi	21 January 2012	3.02

=== Series 8 (2012–2013) ===
No.	Host	Comedian(s)	First broadcast	Viewers (millions)
8x01	Dara Ó Briain	Nina Conti and Danny Bhoy	17 November 2012	2.42
8x02	Rhod Gilbert	Kerry Godliman and Jon Richardson	24 November 2012	2.60
8x03	Kevin Bridges	Phill Jupitus and Sara Pascoe	1 December 2012	2.43
8x04	Lee Nelson	Stewart Francis and Paul Chowdhry	14 December 2012	2.56
8x05	Omid Djalili	Julian Clary and Reginald D. Hunter	21 December 2012	3.61
8x06	Greg Davies	Hal Cruttenden and Simon Evans	4 January 2013	2.76

=== Series 9 (2013–2014) ===
No.	Host	Comedian(s)	First broadcast	Viewers (millions)
9x01	Eddie Izzard	Josh Widdicombe and Trevor Noah	22 November 2013	2.74
9x02	Jack Dee	Seann Walsh and Milton Jones	29 November 2013	2.58
9x03	Sean Lock	Romesh Ranganathan and Marcus Brigstocke	13 December 2013	3.16
9x04	Adam Hills	Andi Osho and Terry Alderton	20 December 2013	2.45
9x05	Jack Whitehall	Katherine Ryan and Rich Hall	8 January 2014	2.23
9x06	Nina Conti	Jimeoin and Rob Beckett	15 January 2014	2.15

=== Series 10 (2014–2015) ===
No.	Host	Comedian(s)	First broadcast	Viewers (millions)
10x01	Sarah Millican	Joe Lycett and Russell Kane	19 November 2014	—N/a
10x02	Jason Manford	Chris Ramsey and Doc Brown	26 November 2014	—N/a
10x03	Frankie Boyle	Simon Evans and Aisling Bea	10 December 2014	—N/a
10x04	Jon Richardson	Sara Pascoe and Nathan Caton	17 December 2014	—N/a
10x05	Hal Cruttenden	Justin Moorhouse and Tom Stade	27 December 2014	2.48
10x06	Danny Bhoy	Miles Jupp and Lee Nelson	2 January 2015	1.71

=== Series 11 (2015) ===
The eleventh series of Live at the Apollo was broadcast on BBC Two for the first time, beginning on 9 November 2015.

No.	Host	Comedian(s)	First broadcast	Viewers (millions)
11x01	Alan Carr	Francesca Martinez and Nish Kumar	9 November 2015	1.07
11x02	Dara Ó Briain	Zoe Lyons and Paul Chowdhry	16 November 2015	—N/a
11x03	Noel Fielding	Dane Baptiste and Al Porter	23 November 2015	—N/a
11x04	Romesh Ranganathan	Jason Byrne and Stewart Francis	30 November 2015	1.08
11x05	Katherine Ryan	Henning Wehn and James Acaster	7 December 2015	—N/a
11x06	Russell Kane	Roisin Conaty and Nick Helm	14 December 2015	1.17
11x07	Nina Conti	Tanyalee Davis, Hal Cruttenden and Josh Widdicombe	20 December 2015	0.99

=== Series 12 (2016) ===
The twelfth series of Live at the Apollo was broadcast on BBC Two from 8 November 2016.

No.	Host	Comedian(s)	First broadcast	Viewers (millions)
12x01	Sarah Millican	Tom Allen and Arj Barker	8 November 2016	1.13
12x02	Josh Widdicombe	Celia Pacquola and Nathan Caton	15 November 2016	—N/a
12x03	Gina Yashere	Ellie Taylor and Sam Simmons	22 November 2016	—N/a
12x04	Adam Hills	Michelle Wolf and Jamali Maddix	29 November 2016	0.75
12x05	Frankie Boyle	Holly Walsh and Jack Carroll	6 December 2016	1.07
12x06	Joe Lycett	Ivo Graham and Phil Wang	13 December 2016	—N/a
12x07	Romesh Ranganathan	Seann Walsh, Kerry Godliman and Spencer Jones	20 December 2016	1.78

=== Series 13 (2017–2018) ===
The thirteenth series of Live at the Apollo was broadcast on BBC Two from 30 November 2017.

No.	Host	Comedian(s)	First broadcast	Viewers (millions)
13x01	Sara Pascoe	Gary Delaney and Larry Dean	30 November 2017	
13x02	Nish Kumar	David O'Doherty and Luisa Omielan	7 December 2017	
13x03	Rob Beckett	Jen Brister and Darren Harriott	14 December 2017	
13x04	Katherine Ryan	Marlon Davis, John Robins and Joel Dommett	29 December 2017	
13x05	Henning Wehn	Lucy Porter and Guz Khan	31 December 2017	
13x06	Dane Baptiste	Desiree Burch and Chris McCausland	4 January 2018	
13x07	Ed Byrne	Angela Barnes and Geoff Norcott	11 January 2018	

=== Series 14 (2018) ===
The fourteenth series of Live at the Apollo was broadcast on BBC Two from 15 November 2018.

No.	Host	Comedian(s)	First broadcast	Viewers (millions)
14x01	Ellie Taylor	Tez Ilyas and Fin Taylor	15 November 2018	
14x02	Dara Ó Briain	Felicity Ward and Mo Gilligan	22 November 2018	
14x03	Gina Yashere	Lost Voice Guy and Ed Gamble	29 November 2018	
14x04	Phil Wang	Brennan Reece and Rachel Parris	6 December 2018	
14x05	Kerry Godliman	Suzi Ruffell and Loyiso Gola	13 December 2018	
14x06	Jamali Maddix	Sindhu Vee and Fern Brady	20 December 2018	
14x07	Sarah Millican	Ahir Shah, Laura Lexx and Gary Delaney	31 December 2018	

=== Series 15 (2019) ===
The fifteenth series of Live at the Apollo was broadcast on BBC Two from 5 November 2019.

No.	Host	Comedian(s)	First broadcast	Viewers (millions)
15x01	Tom Allen	Rosie Jones and Kae Kurd	5 November 2019	
15x02	Sindhu Vee	Alex Edelman and Lou Sanders	12 November 2019	
15x03	Guz Khan	Kiri Pritchard-McLean and Rhys James	19 November 2019	
15x04	Darren Harriott	Jessica Fostekew and Stephen Bailey	26 November 2019	
15x05	Ardal O'Hanlon	Mawaan Rizwan and Sara Barron	3 December 2019	
15x06	Desiree Burch	Paul McCaffrey and Jonny Pelham	10 December 2019	
15x07	Sara Pascoe	Chris McCausland and Flo and Joan	17 December 2019	

=== Series 16 (2021) ===
The sixteenth series of Live at the Apollo was broadcast on BBC Two from 10 November 2021. This show wasn't filmed the previous year (2020) due to the ongoing COVID-19 pandemic.

No.	Host	Comedian(s)	First broadcast	Viewers (millions)
16x01	Chris McCausland	Sophie Duker and Emmanuel Sonubi	10 November 2021	
16x02	Loyiso Gola	Scott Bennett and Helen Bauer	18 November 2021	
16x03	Zoe Lyons	Ria Lina and Tom Ward	24 November 2021	
16x04	Larry Dean	Harriet Kemsley and Slim	1 December 2021	
16x05	Angela Barnes	Sarah Keyworth and Tim Renkow	8 December 2021	
16x06	Jen Brister	Adam Rowe and Esther Manito	15 December 2021	
16x07	Jason Manford	Maisie Adam and Nabil Abdulrashid	22 December 2021	

=== Series 17 (2022–23) ===
The seventeenth series of Live at the Apollo was broadcast on BBC Two from 19 December 2022.

No.	Host	Comedian(s)	First broadcast	Viewers (millions)
17x01	Rosie Jones	Eshaan Akbar and Cally Beaton	19 December 2022	
17x02	Ed Gamble	Tom Davis and Judi Love	6 January 2023	
17x03	Kae Kurd	Laura Smyth and Liam Farrelly	13 January 2023	
17x04	Kiri Pritchard-McLean	Catherine Bohart and Babatunde Aléshé	20 January 2023	
17x05	Geoff Norcott	Michelle de Swarte and Sean McLoughlin	27 January 2023	
17x06	Suzi Ruffell	Alfie Brown and Sikisa	3 February 2023	
17x07	Tez Ilyas	Spring Day and Ignacio Lopez	10 February 2023	

=== Series 18 (2023) ===
The eighteenth series of Live at the Apollo was broadcast on BBC Two from 7 November 2023.

No.	Host	Comedian(s)	First broadcast	Viewers (millions)
18x01	Nabil Abdulrashid	Jake Lambert and Rachel Fairburn	7 November 2023	
18x02	Ria Lina	Lucy Beaumont and Josh Pugh	14 November 2023	
18x03	Lou Sanders	Celya AB and Neil Delamere	21 November 2023	
18x04	Maisie Adam	Michael Odewale and Susie McCabe	28 November 2023	
18x05	Emmanuel Sonubi	Troy Hawke and Olga Koch	5 December 2023	
18x06	Stephen Bailey	Lara Ricote and Glenn Moore	12 December 2023	
18x07	Tom Allen	Thanyia Moore and Lloyd Griffith	18 December 2023	

=== Series 19 (2024–25) ===
The nineteenth series of Live at the Apollo was broadcast on BBC Two from 19 December 2024.

No.	Host	Comedian(s)	First broadcast	Viewers (millions)
19x01	Judi Love	John Kearns and Dan Tiernan	19 December 2024	
19x02	Joel Dommett	Jamie MacDonald and Fatiha El-Ghorri	31 December 2024	
19x03	Paul Chowdhry	Ania Magliano and Ian Smith	7 January 2025	
19x04	Sara Pascoe	Amy Gledhill and Eddie Kadi	14 January 2025	
19x05	Babatúndé Aléshé	Chloe Petts and Lindsey Santoro	21 January 2025	
19x06	Iain Stirling	Harriet Dyer and Maria Shehata	28 January 2025	
19x07	Tim Renkow	Janine Harouni and Stuart Goldsmith	4 February 2025	

=== Series 20 (2025–26) ===
The twentieth series of Live at the Apollo was broadcast on BBC Two from 23 December 2025.

No.	Host	Comedian(s)	First broadcast	Viewers (millions)
20x01	Josh Widdicombe	Andrew Mensah and Harriet Kemsley	23 December 2025	
20x02	Mo Gilligan	Laura Smyth and Josh Pugh	30 December 2025	
20x03	Dara Ó Briain	Jack Skipper and Felicity Ward	6 January 2026	
20x04	Desiree Burch	Suzi Ruffell and Finlay Christie	13 January 2026	
20x05	Ivo Graham	Catherine Bohart and Nabil Abdulrashid	20 January 2026	
20x06	Tom Davis	Kae Kurd and Louise Young	27 January 2026	
20x07	Kiri Pritchard-McLean	Eshaan Akbar and Angela Barnes	3 February 2026	

== Specials ==
Assorted special episodes have been broadcast by the BBC.

No.	Title	First broadcast	Viewers (millions)
Sx01	All Girls (part 1)	2 June 2018	
Sx02	All Girls (part 2)	16 June 2018	
Sx03	Pride (part 1)	25 June 2019	
Sx04	Pride (part 2)	26 August 2019	
Sx05	The One About… Relationships	20 August 2020	
Sx06	The One About… Sex	27 August 2020	
Sx07	The One About… Kids	3 September 2020	
Sx08	The One About… Transport	10 September 2020	
Sx09	The One About… Shopping	17 September 2020	
Sx10	The One About… Celebrity	24 September 2020	
Sx11	Access All Areas	18 November 2020	
Sx12	Secrets of the Apollo	28 December 2020	

== Guest appearances ==
The following have appeared as a guest on the show multiple times up to and including the broadcast episodes of series 15:

=== Most appearances in total ===
14 appearances

- Jack Dee

8 appearances

- Dara Ó Briain

6 appearances

- Jason Manford

5 appearances

- Rich Hall
- Sean Lock
- Sarah Millican
- Sara Pascoe
- Josh Widdicombe

4 appearances

- Frankie Boyle
- Ed Byrne
- Russell Kane

=== Hosts ===
14 appearances as host

- Jack Dee (includes 12 appearances as regular host, plus 2 appearances as guest host)

7 appearances as host

- Dara Ó Briain

4 appearances as host

- Sean Lock
- Sarah Millican
- Jason Manford
