= World's Most Dangerous Roads =

- Genre: Travel documentary
- Narrated by: Adrian Dunbar (2011–2013)
- Composer: Nick Harvey
- Country of origin: United Kingdom
- Original language: English
- No. of series: 7
- No. of episodes: 25 (list of episodes)

Production
- Executive producers: Sue Davidson (BBC); Natalie Wilkinson, Hannah Lamb (Dave)
- Producer: Ewen Thompson
- Editor: Guy Crossman
- Camera setup: Will Churchill
- Running time: 60 minutes (BBC Two); 45 minutes (Dave)
- Production companies: Renegade Pictures (seasons 1–3); Ricochet (season 4–present)

Original release
- Network: BBC Two (2011–2013); Dave (2023–present)
- Release: 4 September 2011 – present

World's Most Dangerous Roads is a British TV series in which two celebrities are filmed as they journey by 4×4 vehicle along roads considered among the world's most dangerous. The show was initially broadcast on BBC Two from 2011 to 2013, and narrated by actor Adrian Dunbar.

A second run was commissioned for the channel Dave, with the fourth series overall shown in 2023, with a fifth and sixth series broadcast in 2024, and a seventh in 2025.

== Episode list ==
=== Series overview ===
Series	Episodes	Originally released			Ave. UK viewers (millions)
Series	Episodes	First released	Last released	Network	Ave. UK viewers (millions)
1	3	4 September 2011	18 September 2011	BBC Two	2.14
2	3	8 July 2012	22 July 2012	BBC Two	1.73
3	3	27 December 2012	9 January 2013	BBC Two	2.06
4	8	12 February 2023	2 April 2023	Dave	0.27
5	8	18 February 2024	7 April 2024	Dave	~0.20
6	2 (+1 Compilation)	3 November 2024	17 November 2024	U&Dave	N/A
7	2 (+1 Compilation)	30 March 2025	13 April 2025	U&Dave	N/A

=== Series 1 (2011) ===
No. overall	No. in series	Starring	Destination	Vehicle	Original release date	Viewers (millions)
1	1	Sue Perkins, Charley Boorman	Alaska	Ford Super Duty	4 September 2011	1.95
2	2	Rhod Gilbert, Greg Davies	Nepal	Nissan Patrol	11 September 2011	2.39
3	3	Ben Fogle, Hugh Dennis	Peru	Toyota Fortuner 3.0 D-4D and Toyota Hilux	18 September 2011	2.09

=== Series 2 (2012) ===
No. overall	No. in series	Starring	Destination	Vehicle	Original release date	Viewers (millions)
4	1	Ed Byrne, Andy Parsons	Siberia	Nissan Safari	8 July 2012	1.48
The pair drove from Yakutsk to Magadan via the Kolyma Highway; via the coldest town in the world, Oymyakon, and the mining city of Ust Nera.
5	2	Sue Perkins, Liza Tarbuck	Vietnam (Ho Chi Minh trail)	Toyota Land Cruiser (80 series) and Ford Everest	15 July 2012	1.92
The pair started in Vinh, Vietnam, before driving into the mountains and towards the Lao border. They crossed the Mu Gia Pass before heading down remote eastern Laos. After reaching the town of Attapeu they crossed back into Vietnam and finished in a beach resort in Da Nang.
6	3	Hugh Dennis, David Baddiel	Ethiopia	Toyota Land Cruiser	22 July 2012	1.80
The pair drove north from the capital Addis Ababa to Dessie and on to the churches at Lalibela. From Lalibela they drove a Chinese-built road to Gondar and on north through the Simien Mountains where they saw Gelada monkeys. They finished in Aksum, getting close to the church believed to house the Ark of the Covenant.

=== Series 3 (2012–13) ===
No. overall	No. in series	Starring	Destination	Vehicle	Original release date	Viewers (millions)
7	1	Angus Deayton, Mariella Frostrup	Madagascar	Ford Everest	27 December 2012	2.22
8	2	Hugh Bonneville, Jessica Hynes	Georgia	Nissan Pathfinder LE (2nd Generation)	28 December 2012	2.12
9	3	Phill Jupitus, Marcus Brigstocke	Bolivia (Yungas Road)	Lexus LX450	9 January 2013	1.83

=== Series 4 (2023) ===
All episodes were made available on UKTV Play on 12 February 2023. The series was later broadcast on BBC Two from 21 October 2025.

According to UKTV, this series reached an average audience of 654,000 per episode, peaking with 848,000 for the second episode. As well as this, "across all outings on Dave to date" (October 2023), the series has reached over 4.1m.

No. overall	No. in series	Starring	Destination	Vehicle	Original release date	Viewers (millions) (Note: Excludes viewership through UKTV Play, both pre- or post-broadcast.)	Directed by
10	1	Will Mellor, Keith Lemon	Albania	Jeep Grand Cherokee	12 February 2023	0.335	Daniel Edwards
11	2	Joe Wilkinson, Zoe Lyons	Turkey	Fiat Fullback	19 February 2023	0.366	Carol White
12	3	Phil Wang, Pierre Novellie	Lesotho	Toyota Hilux	26 February 2023	0.300	Gareth Prescott
13	4	Lara Ricote, Stephen Mangan	Australia	Toyota Land Cruiser	5 March 2023	0.318	Sean McDonnell
14	5	Ed Gamble, Lou Sanders	Iceland	Toyota Land Cruiser	12 March 2023	0.285	Chris O'Donnell
15	6	Saoirse-Monica Jackson, Jamie-Lee O'Donnell	Romania	Mitsubishi Pajero	19 March 2023	0.210	Chris O'Donnell
16	7	Darren Harriott, Ria Lina	South Africa	Toyota Hilux	26 March 2023	0.159	Mat McDonnell
17	8	Suzi Ruffell, Maisie Adam	Morocco	Toyota Land Cruiser	2 April 2023	0.216	Alicia Arce

=== Series 5 (2024) ===
All episodes were made available on UKTV Play on 18 February 2024.

No. overall	No. in series	Starring	Destination	Directed by	Original release date	Viewers (millions)
18	1	Rhod Gilbert, Angela Barnes	Italian Alps	TBA	18 February 2024	0.388
19	2	Seann Walsh, Joe Swash	Guatemala	TBA	25 February 2024	0.287
20	3	Jeff Stelling, Chris Kamara	Sri Lanka	TBA	3 March 2024	0.187
21	4	Mike Wozniak, Ola Labib	Namibia	TBA	10 March 2024	N/A
22	5	David Harewood, Fraser James	Slovenia	TBA	17 March 2024	0.143
23	6	Desiree Burch, Jessica Fostekew	United States (Colorado)	TBA	24 March 2024	0.168
24	7	Jamali Maddix, Larry Dean	Bhutan	TBA	31 March 2024	0.126
25	8	Olga Koch, Thanyia Moore	Bulgaria	TBA	7 April 2024	0.103

=== Series 6 (2024) ===
A sixth series comprising six episodes, including a compilation special, was confirmed for November 2024. This was later split into two series.

No. overall	No. in series	Starring	Destination	Directed by	Original release date
26	1	Lucy Beaumont, Johnny Vegas	Montenegro	TBA	3 November 2024
27	2	Babatunde Aléshé, Kae Kurd	Zambia	TBA	10 November 2024
-	-	Various	Various	TBA	17 November 2024
World's Most Dangerous Roads: Rhod Gilbert's Extra Mile. Compilation special narrated by Gilbert.

=== Series 7 (2025) ===
No. overall	No. in series	Starring	Destination	Directed by	Original release date
29	1	Jack Dee and Jake Lambert	Kyrgyzstan	TBA	30 March 2025
30	2	Alex Brooker and Ellie Taylor	Indonesia (Java)	TBA	6 April 2025
-	-	Various	Various	TBA	13 April 2025
World's Most Dangerous Roads: Rhod Gilbert's Extra Mile 2. Compilation special narrated by Gilbert.
