= Mel Giedroyc: Unforgivable =

- Genre: Panel show
- Presented by: Mel Giedroyc; Lou Sanders
- Country of origin: United Kingdom
- Original language: English
- No. of series: 4
- No. of episodes: 32

Production
- Running time: 60 minutes (including advertisements)
- Production company: Expectation

Original release
- Network: Dave
- Release: 2 February 2021 – 30 April 2024

Mel Giedroyc: Unforgivable is a British television panel show presented by Mel Giedroyc and Lou Sanders. The show was broadcast for four series on Dave between 2 February 2021 and 30 April 2024.

== Format ==
Three celebrity guests compete to see who has the most shameful secrets. Points are awarded negatively by Giedroyc depending on the seriousness of the confession, with the very worst confessions being met by the ringing of a gong. For the fourth series, Sanders visited locations around the United Kingdom to ask for confessions from members of the public.

== Production ==
The show was made by Expectation Entertainment at Riverside Studios in London.

Mel Giedroyc: Unforgivable was announced by Dave in February 2020. The show was being rehearsed the following month when the first COVID-19 lockdown was announced; it was postponed until October 2020, when a small audience was permitted. In April 2021, Giedroyc appeared on Lorraine and announced the second series. A year later, the third series was announced. In September 2023, the fourth series was announced. Dave announced the conclusion of the show in March 2025.

Katherine Ryan took part on the programme while holding her newborn baby. Giedroyc noted that this made the show more inclusive than the House of Commons, where Stella Creasy had been prohibited from doing the same.

== Series overview ==
Series	Episodes	Originally released	
Series	Episodes	First released	Last released
1	8	2 February 2021	23 March 2021
2	8	8 February 2022	29 March 2022
3	8	20 September 2022	8 November 2022
4	8	12 March 2024	30 April 2024

== Episodes ==
=== Series 1 (2021) ===
No. overall	No. in series	Guests	Original release date
1	1	Graham Norton, Desiree Burch, Alex Brooker	2 February 2021
2	2	Jimmy Carr, Judi Love, Richard Bacon	9 February 2021
3	3	Johnny Vegas, Clare Balding, Josh Widdicombe	16 February 2021
4	4	Tom Allen, Gemma Collins, Darren Harriott	23 February 2021
5	5	Richard Ayoade, Ed Gamble, Sindhu Vee	2 March 2021
6	6	Jennifer Saunders, Harry Redknapp, Phil Wang	9 March 2021
7	7	Jo Brand, Sara Pascoe, Chris Kamara	16 March 2021
8	8	David Baddiel, Rob Rinder, Sophie Duker	23 March 2021

=== Series 2 (2022) ===
No. overall	No. in series	Guests	Original release date
9	1	Sarah Millican, Chris McCausland, Jamali Maddix	8 February 2022
10	2	Katherine Ryan, Bimini Bon-Boulash, Toussaint Douglass	15 February 2022
11	3	Bill Bailey, Rosie Jones, David Haye	22 February 2022
12	4	Rob Beckett, Scarlett Moffatt, Paul Chowdhry	1 March 2022
13	5	Sally Phillips, Alan Davies, Ria Lina	8 March 2022
14	6	Sara Cox, Keith Lemon, Nabil Abdulrashid	15 March 2022
15	7	Jack Dee, Lorraine Kelly, Munya Chawawa	22 March 2022
16	8	Jason Manford, AJ Odudu, Jessica Knappett	29 March 2022

=== Series 3 (2022) ===
No. overall	No. in series	Guests	Original release date
17	1	Rhod Gilbert, Susan Wokoma, Dermot O'Leary	20 September 2022
18	2	Craig Revel Horwood, Joel Dommett, Thanyia Moore	27 September 2022
19	3	Charlotte Church, Sophie Willan, Lara Ricote	4 October 2022
20	4	Guz Khan, Roisin Conaty, Gregg Wallace	11 October 2022
21	5	Ellie Taylor, Josh Pugh, Stephen Mangan	18 October 2022
22	6	Lethal Bizzle, Kerry Godliman, Tom Lucy	25 October 2022
23	7	Meera Syal, Seann Walsh, Maisie Adam	1 November 2022
24	8	Olga Koch, Jonathan Ross, Slim	8 November 2022

=== Series 4 (2024) ===
No. overall	No. in series	Guests	Original release date
25	1	Rylan Clark, Lucy Beaumont, Fatiha El-Ghorri	12 March 2024
26	2	Joel Dommett, Omid Djalili, Lindsey Santoro	19 March 2024
27	3	Nish Kumar, Ruby Wax, Reuben Kaye	26 March 2024
28	4	Rafe Spall, Dan Tiernan, Carol Vorderman	2 April 2024
29	5	Ross Kemp, Shirley Ballas, Rosie Jones	9 April 2024
30	6	Daisy May Cooper, Emmanuel Sonubi, Ardal O'Hanlon	16 April 2024
31	7	Alex Jones, Iain Stirling, Tim Renkow	23 April 2024
32	8	Jamie Laing, Fern Brady, Jordan Stephens	30 April 2024

== Reception ==
In a 3.5-star review, Steve Bennett of Chortle found the scoring system too complicated, but praised the stories from the guests. Joel Golby of The Guardian praised the show, though found it to not be as good as Taskmaster, which had moved from Dave to Channel 4. Broadcast gave it its award for Best Entertainment Programme of 2021.

The first episode had an audience of 468,000, the highest audience of the week on Dave. The second series was most watched programme in its time slot on all non-terrestrial channels.
