= Question Team =

British panel show

- Genre: Comedy; Panel game
- Created by: Jamie Ormerod
- Written by: Matt Hulme; Matthew Crosby
- Directed by: Barbara Wiltshire
- Presented by: Richard Ayoade
- Country of origin: United Kingdom
- Original language: English
- No. of series: 2
- No. of episodes: 16

Production
- Production location: Television Centre
- Running time: 60 minutes
- Production company: Interstellar

Original release
- Network: Dave
- Release: 12 October 2021 – 31 October 2022

Question Team is a British television comedy panel show presented by Richard Ayoade. The show features three different comedian guests each episode, who each present a round of their own questions. Question Team was first broadcast on Dave on 12 October 2021, with episodes airing at 10p.m. on Tuesdays for the first series, and at 10p.m. on Mondays for the second.

Accompanying the release of the second series was a YouTube series called Question Team: Interrogations. Comedians Abi Clarke and Huge Davies interrogated the soon-to-be Question Team guests on their chosen topic before their appearance on the show.

It was cancelled in 2023.

== Format ==
Question Team flips the traditional panel show format by inviting each of the three comedian guests to bring their own round of questions about their own chosen specialist topic. The other two guests, as well as Ayoade, must answer these questions—which often involve the utilization of props, people, and/or the large in-studio screen. Each episode features three comedians, but after each has presented their round, Ayoade delegates his round to be presented by a fourth comedian. The comedians' chosen topics of interest range greatly, from topics such as DIY to animation.

Rounds are out of up to 5 points, and the winner at the end of each episode receives a mystery prize in a manila envelope, and a Question Team-branded bomber jacket and travel mug (in Series 1) or tote bag (in Series 2).

== Episodes ==
Series	Episodes	Originally released	
Series	Episodes	First released	Last released
1	8	12 October 2021	30 November 2021
2	8	12 September 2022	31 October 2022

=== Series 1 (2021) ===
No. overall	No. in series	Guests	Ayoade's guest	Original release date
1	1	Bob Mortimer (DIY), Thanyia Moore (Music), Kerry Godliman (Camping)	Rob Carter	12 October 2021
2	2	Katherine Ryan (Social Media), Desiree Burch (Astrology), Ivo Graham (Music Festivals)	Nick Helm	19 October 2021
3	3	Nish Kumar (Movies), Rosie Jones (Dictators), Maisie Adam (Driving Test)	Mat Ewins	26 October 2021
4	4	James Acaster (People), Kemah Bob (Art of Attraction), Olga Koch (Role-playing Games)	Flo and Joan	2 November 2021
5	5	Johnny Vegas (General Knowledge), Sophie Duker (Women), Rachel Parris (Leicester)	Lost Voice Guy	9 November 2021
6	6	Ria Lina (Forensics), Alex Brooker (Language and Words), Sarah Kendall (Karate)	David O'Doherty	16 November 2021
7	7	Kiri Pritchard-McLean (True Crime), Toussaint Douglass (Film), Lou Sanders (World Records)	The Delightful Sausage	23 November 2021
8	8	Sara Pascoe (Hen Dos), Jessica Knappett (Board Games), Darren Harriott (Conspiracy Theories)	Isy Suttie	30 November 2021

=== Series 2 (2022) ===
No. overall	No. in series	Guests (and topic)	Ayoade's guest	Original release date
9	1	Josh Pugh (The World's Strongest Man), Jo Brand (Chocolate), Thanyia Moore (Movies)	Bill Bailey	12 September 2022
10	2	Jonathan Ross (Superheroes), Holly Walsh (Homemade Games), Desiree Burch (Animation)	Rachel Riley	19 September 2022
11	3	Nish Kumar (Takeaway), Helen Bauer (Drama), Katherine Parkinson (Elvis)	Marc Wootton	26 September 2022
12	4	Joel Dommett (Fitness), Janine Harouni (Staten Island), Harriet Kemsley (Children's Books)	Joe Wilkinson	3 October 2022
13	5	James Acaster (People), Jen Brister (The 90s), Lara Ricote (Lipreading)	Rosie Jones	10 October 2022
14	6	Stephen Mangan (Horror), Katherine Ryan (Excuses), Dana Alexander (Drag)	Adam Kay	17 October 2022
15	7	Ellie Taylor (Doppelgängers), Reginald D. Hunter (Controversy), Sue Perkins (General Knowledge)	Nick Helm	24 October 2022
16	8	Dane Baptiste (the Mafia), Angela Barnes (Formula 1), Lou Sanders (Roller Skating)	Tim Vine	31 October 2022
