= Hypothetical (TV series) =

- Title card for Hypothetical
- Genre: Comedy; Panel game
- Created by: Josh Widdicombe; Tom Craine; Matthew Crosby
- Written by: Tom Craine; Matthew Crosby; Henry Paker
- Presented by: Josh Widdicombe; James Acaster
- Country of origin: United Kingdom
- Original language: English
- No. of series: 4
- No. of episodes: 32

Production
- Producers: Sophie Le Good; Joe McVey; Stu Mather; Josh Widdicombe
- Running time: 60 minutes (inc. adverts)
- Production company: Hat Trick Productions

Original release
- Network: Dave
- Release: 6 February 2019 – 6 July 2022

Hypothetical is a British television comedy panel show created by British comedian Josh Widdicombe, with Tom Craine and Matthew Crosby. Widdicombe hosts the show alongside fellow comedian James Acaster. The TV series features teams of celebrity guests (often comedians), who are presented with a bizarre hypothetical situation by Widdicombe. The guests must explain how they would deal with the situation, following the rules given by Acaster, who then awards points based on how well he thinks they have done. The show ran for four series, from 6 February 2019 to 6 July 2022.

In May 2022, a podcast based on the programme—Hypothetical: The Podcast—began. In the same month, the fourth series of Hypothetical premiered.

== Format ==
The host, Josh Widdicombe, presents the guests with hypothetical situations that they must approach, following the rules laid out by James Acaster. The guest is awarded points by Acaster, from 0 to 5, based on the quality of their answers, and the team with the most points at the end of the show wins. After awarding the points Acaster often presents his solution. The show makes heavy use of improvisation with props, in the style of a parlour game.

In addition to general discussion between the hosts and guests, the show also features pre-recorded filmed inserts, and some role-play of the guests' suggested solution with James Acaster in the studio. There are several different rounds in the show:

In the final round, the panel must guess whether a given celebrity would choose to wear a big or small hat for the rest of their life. In this image, co-host James Acaster demonstrates the two hats.

- What Would You Do? - Panelists are given a hypothetical situation and are asked how they would deal with it. This question may be given to one panelist, or two facing-off each other to see who has the best answer. Up to five points are given in this round.
- Not For a Million Quid - All four panelists are asked how much they would have to be paid to endure a particular hypothetical situation. The person who bids the lowest has to prove they can carry out the hypothetical, but if Acaster believes the bid is not genuine he can disqualify them. Up to three points are awarded.
- The Great Wall of Celebrities - The panel have to guess how certain celebrity guests responded to different hypotheticals. In the first series there was a single celebrity per episode, but from series two onwards six celebrities appear in each episode, and the teams take it in turns to pick one per question. One point is given for each right answer.
- The Randomiser (Series 2–3) - A hypothetical situation is generated at random using three tombola machines, for either one panelist or two facing-off to deal with. Up to five points are awarded.
- James's Wishlist (Series 4) - Two panelists go head-to-head to achieve a personal hypothetical situation which Acaster wishes to come true. Up to five points are awarded.
- On The Spot (Series 4) - Widdicombe gives a series of rapid-fire hypothetical questions against the clock. Acaster nominates a panelist to answer it as fast as they can. If Widdicombe or Acaster are not satisfied with the answer, they pause the clock and make the panelist give a more detailed response. The best panelist scores just one point for their team in this round.
- Big Hat Small Hat - The final round, dubbed by the Widdicombe as the "stone cold original" hypothetical question. The team with the lowest score picks one of the celebrities from "The Great Wall of Celebrities" (in Series 1 there was no choice as there was only one celebrity per episode) and has to guess whether that celebrity would decide to wear a big hat or a small hat. The rules as described by Acaster are: "You have to wear the hat every day for the rest of your life, you cannot wear a medium-sized hat over the small hat, and these are the hats", these being a ridiculously large and ridiculously tiny top hat. The points offered are always one point more than gap between the two teams, meaning the episode result always hinges on getting the answer right.

== Podcast ==
In 2022, a podcast version of the show was released, wherein a guest host asks Widdicombe and Acaster hypothetical questions.

== Production ==
Hypothetical was devised by Widdicombe with Matthew Crosby and Tom Craine, who also act as writers. It was an outgrowth of Widdicombe's use of hypothetical questions to make conversation while touring. The initial idea of the show was pitched via a WhatsApp conversation, and subsequently developed by London-based Hat Trick Productions and commissioned as a UKTV Original for Dave by Richard Watsham, UKTV's director of commissioning and Steve North, genre general manager for entertainment and comedy, in July 2018. Joe McVey was announced as executive producer alongside Stu Mather at Hat Trick Productions with Sophie Le Good as producer. From series 2 Henry Paker was also a writer on the show.

The programme is written by Widdicombe, Tom Craine, Matthew Crosby and Henry Paker. The hypothetical questions are not targeted at specific panelists. Guests turn up without prepared material.

The show is filmed in front of a live audience at Pinewood Studios. The first series was filmed in August and September 2018. Acaster and Widdicombe have previously worked together, with Acaster appearing often as a guest on Widdicombe's XFM (now Radio X) show.

Widdicombe said of the TV show, and working with Acaster:

“I have spent the last decade of my life annoying other comics with these questions in cars and dressing rooms so I am delighted Dave have allowed me to claim that I was in fact researching a show and not just wasting everyone’s time. More to the point I cannot wait to work alongside the man who makes me laugh more than anyone else in comedy. I just hope this goes better than our 2009 Edinburgh show (one star, Three Weeks magazine).”

This 2009 Edinburgh show was the work of Widdicombe, Acaster and Nick Helm, and, according to Widdicombe, the criticism they received for it was read out during filming of Hypothetical to warm up the audience.

The announcement of Hypothetical caused controversy due to a perceived similarity to the Danielle Ward podcast Do The Right Thing which had been made into a television pilot but not commissioned.

Series three was filmed under social distancing restrictions due to the COVID-19 pandemic, while series four had a looser restriction on the size of the audience.

It was announced in June 2023 that the programme had been cancelled.

== Episodes ==
Series	Episodes	Originally released	
Series	Episodes	First released	Last released
1	8	6 February 2019	27 March 2019
2	8	5 February 2020	25 March 2020
3	8	10 February 2021	31 March 2021
4	8	18 May 2022	6 July 2022

=== Series 1 (2019) ===
Series 1 was broadcast on Wednesdays at 10pm on Dave, (Note: In April and May 2025, BBC Two aired an edited version of the first series (without commercial breaks) on Tuesday evenings) with episodes available On-Demand at UKTV Play. Each episode features four guest panellists in two teams of two, alongside the hosts Widdicombe and Acaster.

No. overall	No. in series	Guests	Original release date	UK Viewers	28-Day Viewers
1	1	Rob Beckett & Jessica Knappett; Liza Tarbuck & Tom Allen	6 February 2019	475,755	731,572 (Note: Also includes pre-transmission viewers, as the first episode was released on UKTV Play prior to first linear broadcast.)
2	2	Romesh Ranganathan & Rachel Parris; Jon Richardson & Rose Matafeo	13 February 2019	538,776	596,816
3	3	Sara Pascoe & Lou Sanders; Nish Kumar & Ed Gamble	20 February 2019	379,690	420,727
4	4	Romesh Ranganathan & Rosie Jones; Kerry Godliman & Matt Forde	27 February 2019	233,800	273,701
5	5	Dara Ó Briain & Kiri Pritchard-McLean; Suzi Ruffell & Nish Kumar	6 March 2019	270,149	318,436
6	6	Roisin Conaty & Phil Wang; Victoria Coren Mitchell & Darren Harriott	13 March 2019	347,271	383,325
7	7	Katherine Ryan & John Robins; Ivo Graham & Cariad Lloyd	20 March 2019	288,989	325,941
8	8	Sara Pascoe & Guz Khan; Cariad Lloyd & David O'Doherty	27 March 2019	321,061	332,838

=== Series 2 (2020) ===
No. overall	No. in series	Guests	Original release date	UK Viewers	28-Day Viewers
9	1	Maisie Adam & Jonathan Ross; Sara Barron & Rob Beckett	5 February 2020	390,544	TBA
10	2	Richard Ayoade & Sindhu Vee; Ed Gamble & Chloe Petts	12 February 2020	354,554	TBA
11	3	Tom Allen & Felicity Ward; Sue Perkins & Alex Brooker	19 February 2020	302,141	TBA
12	4	Angela Barnes & Guz Khan; Tom Davis & Harriet Kemsley	26 February 2020	288,579	TBA
13	5	Nish Kumar & Jen Brister; Rob Beckett & Lou Sanders	4 March 2020	280,281	TBA
14	6	Stephen Mangan & Tessa Coates; Charlie Brooker & Shappi Khorsandi	11 March 2020	260,469	TBA
15	7	Johnny Vegas & Zoe Lyons; Sara Pascoe & Richard Osman	18 March 2020	276,174	TBA
16	8	Jamali Maddix & Laura Lexx; Rosie Jones & Joe Lycett	25 March 2020	328,226	TBA

=== Series 3 (2021) ===
No. overall	No. in series	Guests	Original release date	UK Viewers	28-Day Viewers
17	1	Suzi Ruffell & Tom Allen; Sophie Duker & Desiree Burch	10 February 2021	321,941	TBA
18	2	Joe Wilkinson & Harriet Kemsley; Jessica Knappett & Miles Jupp	17 February 2021	303,884	TBA
19	3	Richard Ayoade & Roisin Conaty; Evelyn Mok & Ivo Graham	24 February 2021	292,108	TBA
20	4	Victoria Coren Mitchell & Joe Sutherland; Ed Gamble & Maisie Adam	3 March 2021	322,191	TBA
21	5	Alan Davies & Liza Tarbuck; Chris McCausland & Judi Love	10 March 2021	N/A	TBA
22	6	Sally Phillips & Helen Bauer; Huge Davies & Joel Dommett	17 March 2021	N/A	TBA
23	7	Jo Brand & Jessica Fostekew; Ellie Taylor & Phil Wang	24 March 2021	N/A	TBA
24	8	Sara Pascoe & Sindhu Vee; Dane Baptiste & Sue Perkins	31 March 2021	N/A	TBA

=== Series 4 (2022) ===
No. overall	No. in series	Guests (team name)	Original release date	UK viewers	28-Day viewers
25	1	Guz Khan & Richard Ayoade ("Compostable"); Chloe Petts & Maisie Adam ("Big Mix")	18 May 2022	N/A	TBA
26	2	Dara Ó Briain & Ninia Benjamin ("DA R R NIN TA"); Roisin Conaty & Phil Wang ("Philroisious")	25 May 2022	N/A	TBA
27	3	Jo Brand & Bill Bailey ("Fun-mongers"); Harriet Kemsley & Darren Harriott ("Harrieott")	1 June 2022	N/A	TBA
28	4	Jack Dee & Guz Khan ("New Variant"); Rose Johnson & Suzi Ruffell ("Carbonara")	8 June 2022	N/A	TBA
29	5	Frank Skinner & Esther Manito ("Dead Horse"); Rosie Jones & Jon Richardson ("Jon and Carer")	15 June 2022	N/A	TBA
30	6	Judi Love & Amy Gledhill ("Sexy Waltzers"); Josh Pugh & Liza Tarbuck ("Team Gasoline")	22 June 2022	N/A	TBA
31	7	Ross Noble & Angela Barnes ("Waterstones"); Sunil Patel & Lou Sanders ("Lovely Mums")	29 June 2022	N/A	TBA
32	8	Victoria Coren Mitchell & Isy Suttie ("( )", Sunny); Toussaint Douglass & Rosie Jones ("Cher")	6 July 2022	N/A	TBA

== Accolades ==
In 2022 Acaster received a nomination in the Outstanding Male Comedy Entertainment Performance at the National Comedy Awards for his work on the show; the award was given posthumously to Sean Lock.
