= Shehata =

Shehata is an Arabic surname. Notable people with the surname include:

- Aya Shehata (born 2003), Egyptian taekwondo practitioner
- Hamza Shehata (c.1910-c.1971), Saudi philosopher, poet and civic leader
- Hassan Shehata (born 1949), Egyptian football player and coach
- Hasan Shahhata (1946–2013), Egyptian ex-Sunni cleric and scholar, who converted to Shia Islam, killed in Giza by a mob
- Maria Shehata, American-Egyptian comedian based in the UK
- Mohamed Raafat Shehata, Egyptian major-general and head of General Intelligence Directorate
- Nabil Shehata (born 1980), German-Egyptian conductor and double bassist
- Nehad Shehata (born 1975), Egyptian volleyball player
- Reda Shehata (born 1981), Egyptian football player
- Riad Shehata, Egyptian photographer
- Thirwat Shehata (also Tarwat Salah Abdallah) (born 1960), alleged core member of Egyptian Islamic Jihad

== See also ==
- Shehata's Shop, in Arabic Dokkan Shehata, 2009 Egyptian drama film
