= Laura Smyth (comedian) =

British comedian

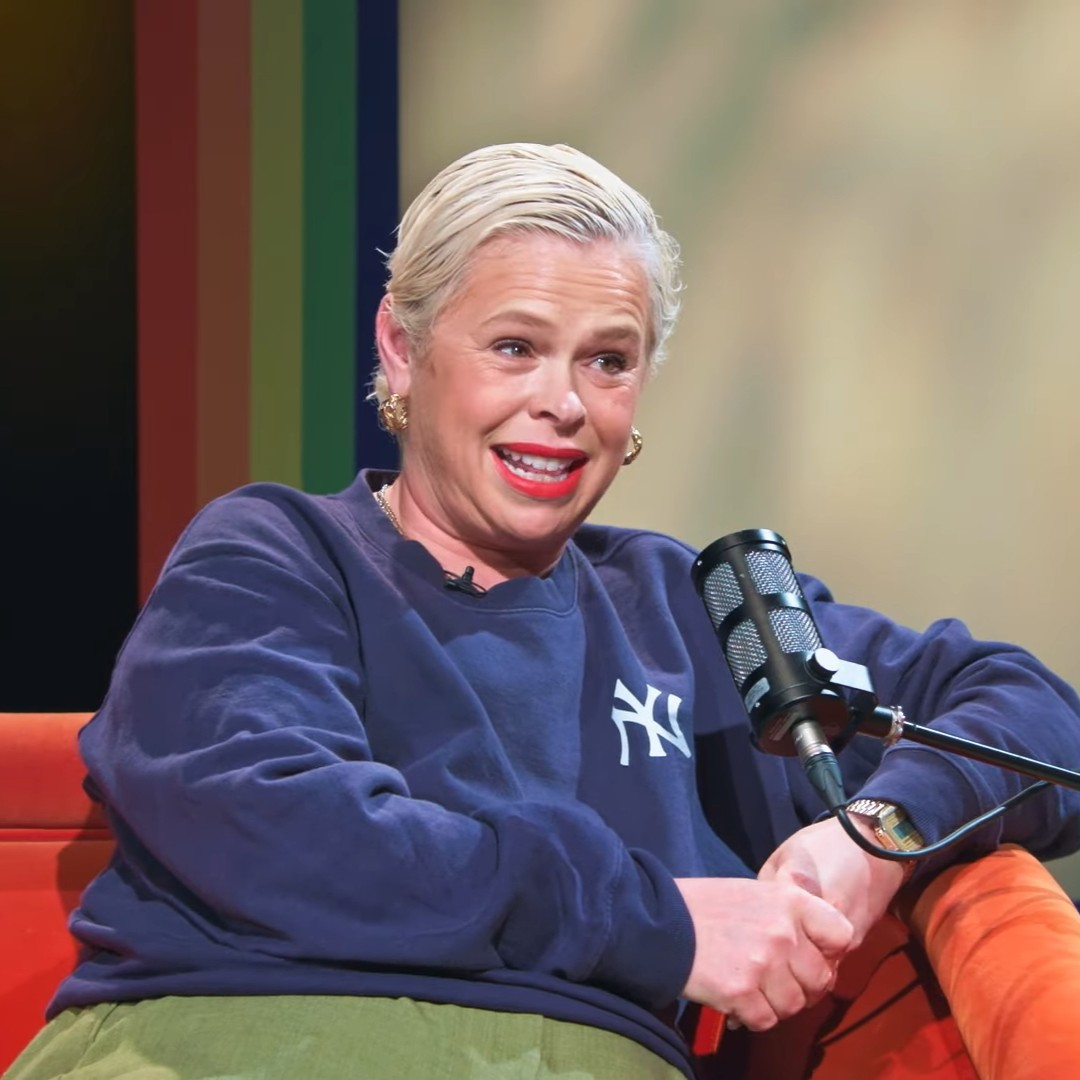
- Smyth on The Harry Hill Show podcast in 2026
- Born: 15 November 1981 (age 44); London, England
- Occupations: Comedian; writer
- Website: laurasmyth.com

Laura Smyth (born 15 November 1981) is an English comedian and writer. She won the Funny Women award in 2019.

== Biography ==
Smyth was born on 15 November 1981 and was brought up in East London. She worked as an English teacher until 2021, when she became a full-time comedian. She entered the Funny Women awards and after proceeding through the heats she won the main stage award in 2019.

She appeared on Jonathan Ross' Comedy Club on ITV in the second episode and was invited to Alan Davies: As Yet Untitled where she joined Davies, Tez Ilyas, Sara Pascoe and Ade Edmondson for a chat.

Smyth has appeared on both the regular Countdown game show as a contestant (then called Laura Taylor) and the comedy panel show version 8 Out Of 10 Cats Does Countdown.

In 2022 it was announced that the BBC comedy Bad Education was to return for a new series. The writing team included Smyth, Nathan Bryon, Leila Navabi, Priya Hall and Ciaran Bartlett.

In 2024 Smyth appeared as comedy emcee Glenda in an episode of the Netflix miniseries Baby Reindeer.

== Personal life ==
Smyth is married and has three children. In September 2021 she was diagnosed with stage 3 breast cancer. She performed on Live at the Apollo two weeks after her cancer treatment concluded.
