= Flo and Joan =

British comedy act

Flo & Joan
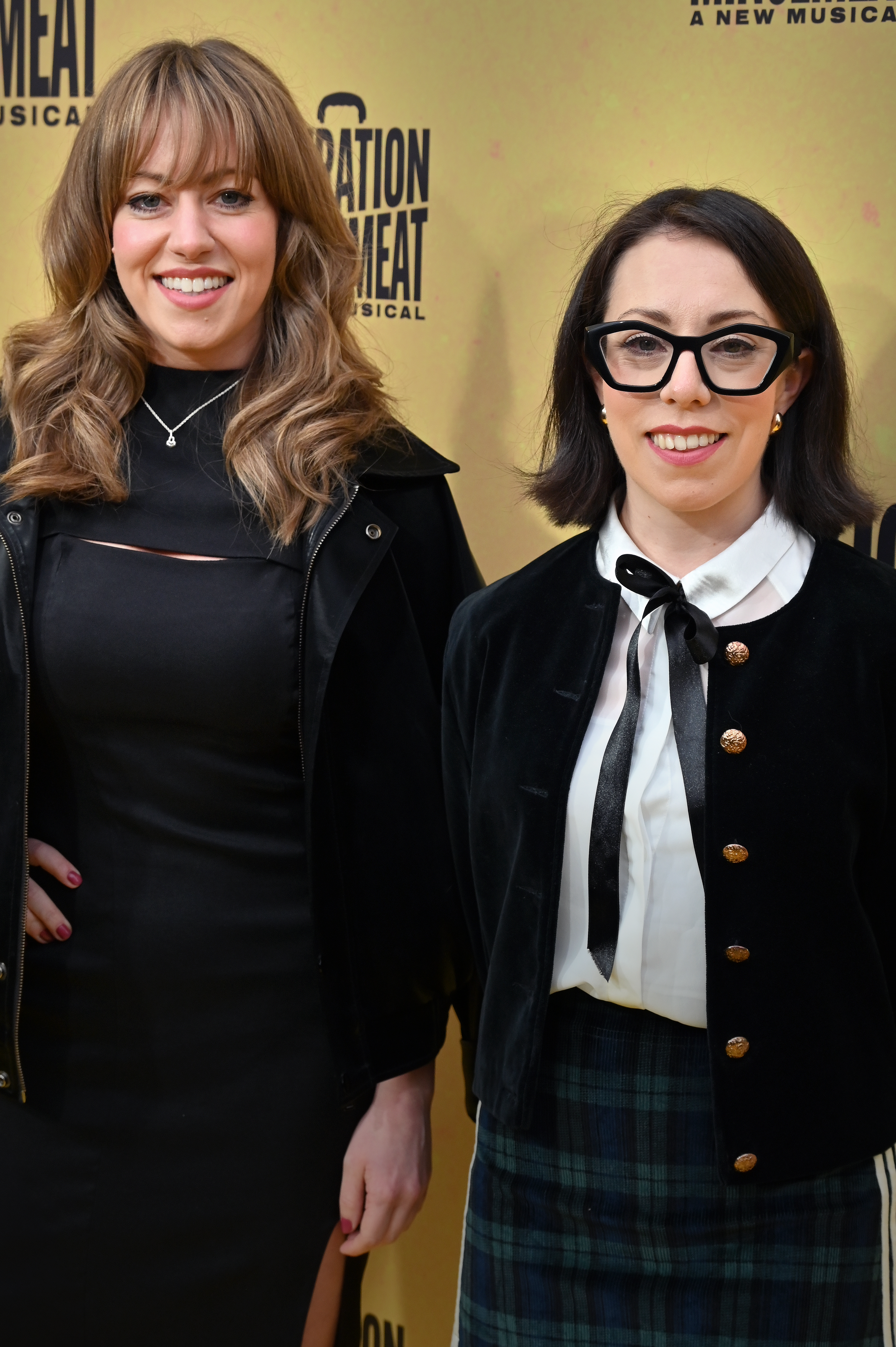
- Rosie ("Joan") and Nicola ("Flo") Dempsey in 2025

Background information
- Also known as: Flo and Joan
- Origin: England
- Genre: Comedy
- Years active: 2015–present
- Members: Nicola Dempsey; Rosie Dempsey
- Website: www.floandjoan.com

Flo and Joan are an English comedy music act consisting of sisters Rosie Dempsey (vocals, percussion, electronic drums, recorder) and Nicola Dempsey (vocals, piano, recorder). The act generally consists of comedy songs the sisters have written themselves, that blend elements such as alliteration, political humour and observational comedy. Their stage names are taken from their grandmother and her sister.

Flo and Joan have been featured on BBC One's Live at the Apollo, Stamptown Comedy Night and the Off Menu podcast, amongst other media. In 2018, they were featured in a Nationwide Building Society television advert. They released an Amazon Prime Video special, Alive on Stage, based on their Edinburgh Fringe show in 2019.

In 2024, Flo and Joan wrote and composed One Man Musical, about Andrew Lloyd Webber. They appeared themselves as backing musicians, with George Fouracres starring as Lloyd Webber.

The sisters grew up in Portsmouth, lived in Toronto for a few years, and as of February 2019, now live in London.

== Works ==
=== Tours ===
Year	Title
2018–19	Alive on Stage
2019–20	Before the Screaming Starts
2022	Sweet Release
2026	With Feeling

=== Comedy specials ===
Year	Title	Platform
2019	Alive on Stage	Amazon Prime Video

=== Television ===
Year	Title
2019	Melbourne International Comedy Festival Opening Night Comedy Allstars Supershow
2019	Royal Variety Performance
2019	Live at the Apollo
2020	The Russell Howard Hour
2020	Jonathan Ross' Comedy Club
2021	The Russell Howard Hour
2022	Melbourne International Comedy Festival Opening Night Comedy Allstars Supershow
2022	Question Team
2025	Melbourne International Comedy Festival Opening Night Comedy Allstars Supershow
2026	The Last Leg

== Awards ==
- Leicester Comedy Festival Best Musical Act
- Chortle Awards Best Music & Variety Act 2018
- Toronto Sketch Comedy Festival, Audience Choice Award 2017
