= Maria Shehata =

American-Egyptian comedian

- Born: Columbus, Ohio
- Occupation: Comedian
- Height: 4 ft 11 in (150 cm)
- Awards: Best Comedian at Hollywood Festival of New Cinema, Best Comedy at the Miami Web Fest
- Website: https://www.mariashehata.com/

Maria Shehata is an Egyptian-American comedian and podcaster based in London. Born in Columbus, Ohio, Shehata became involved in comedy to break down stereotypes of Arab people in the United States. Shehata co-hosts the podcast, 2 Non Doctors with fellow comedian Liz Miele.

== Biography ==
Maria Shehata was born and grew up in Columbus, Ohio in an Egyptian family. Her family is from Egypt's Coptic Christian minority. She became interested in pursuing comedy after watching a Jim Gaffigan special at a prom night after party.

=== Start in stand-up ===
Shehata began her comedy career in Los Angeles and New York. She trained in comedy at Second City and with the Upright Citizen's Brigade. In 2003, Shehata became involved with the New York Arab-American Comedy Festival. Shehata's comedy covers themes around family and her personal life, touching on her Arab identity sparingly. She has appeared on The Watch List on Comedy Central and Bridging the Gap on Showtime.

In 2011, Shehata and comedians Amer Zahr and Ahmed Ahmed performed on a comedy tour of the Middle East, performing in Palestine and Doha.

=== Move to the UK ===
In 2017, her show Wisdomless was shortlisted for one of the Best New Acts at the Edinburgh Fringe Festival. The show covered her recent relocation to the United Kingdom from Los Angeles for a romantic partner. Shehata's writing about their relationship later appeared in The New York Times' Modern Love section.

Not long after arriving in the United Kingdom, her relationship fell apart, the story of which would later become part of her comedy routine and 2019 Edinburgh Fringe show, Hero.

Alongside Prince Abdi, Fatiha El-Ghouri, and Janine Harouini, Shehata performed in Arabs Are Not Funny, a comedy showcase of Arab comedians.

In January 2025, Shehata made her debut on the BBC comedy programme Live at the Apollo.

=== Podcasting ===
In March 2020, Shehata and comedian Liz Miele began hosting the podcast, 2 Non Doctors, covering health and their personal lives. In September 2020, Shehata appeared on an episode of the BBC Radio 4 podcast, You're Dead to Me alongside Greg Jenner and Sarah Parcak discussing the Egyptian pyramids. In 2022, she appeared on Kemah Bob's Femmes of Color FOC It Up podcast.
