= Jessica Fostekew =

English stand-up comedian

- Born: 5 July 1983 (age 43); Sheffield, South Yorkshire, England
- Education: London School of Economics
- Occupations: Actor; comedian
- Years active: 2008–present
- Website: jessicafostekew.com

Jessica Alice Fostekew (born 5 July 1983) is an English actress and stand-up comedian.

== Biography ==
Fostekew was born in Sheffield in 1983 and grew up in Langton Matravers, Dorset. She is of one-quarter Austrian ancestry. She earned an LL.B. from the London School of Economics.

Fostekew has written for Mock The Week, 8 Out of 10 Cats Does Countdown and The News Quiz. She has co-hosted The Guilty Feminist podcast. In 2019, her show Hench was nominated for the Main Award at the Edinburgh Comedy Awards. Also, in 2019, she appeared on Live at the Apollo and on the BBC Radio 4 comedy talk show The Museum of Curiosity. She has appeared on QI in 2020 and 2021.

Fostekew is a contributing columnist in The Guardian, covering topics including parenting, body image, and marriage equality.

She launched a new show, Iconic Breath, in October 2025 covering stories about love, family, and middle age with, according to the Guardian, "impressive technique and efficiency". The show tours the UK through February 2026.

Fostekew is a keen weightlifter; whilst it has been claimed that she integrates this hobby into her act, she has clarified in a recent radio interview that this is not the case.

== Filmography ==
=== Radio ===
Year	Title	Role	Notes
2023	Sturdy Girl Club	Jessica Fostekew	BBC Radio 4
2024	Sturdy Girl Club	Jessica Fostekew	BBC Radio 4

=== Film ===
Year	Title	Role	Notes
2006	Hallo Panda	Zoo Worker & The General Public	Short (billed as Jessica Fortiskew)
2013	Battlecock!	Anya Krullmuller	Short (billed as Jessica Fortekew)
2013	Timeholes	The Woman	Short
2019	Official Secrets	Courtroom Guard	
2019	Greed	Sally	
2023	Scrapper	Sian	

=== Television ===
Year	Title	Role	Notes
2017	Three Girls	Sonia	Mini-series, Episode: "#1.2"
2017	Motherland	Clare	Episode: "The After Party"
2019	Cuckoo	Angela	Episode: "Ivy Nanny"
2019	Live at the Apollo	Herself - Special Guest	Episode: "Darren Harriott, Jessica Fostekew, Stephen Bailey"
2020	Trigonometry	Mum 1	Mini-series, Episode: "Viel zu verliebt"
2020	The Trouble with Maggie Cole	Betty Jarvis	2 episodes: "#1.2" and "#1.4"
2020	Out of Her Mind	Laptop Woman	Episode: "I Don't"
2020	House of Games	Herself - Contestant	Episodes: "#4.36" to "#4.40"
2020, 2021	QI	Herself - Panellist	2 episodes: "Revolutions" and "Sensational"
2021	Hypothetical	Herself - Guest	Episode: "#3.7"
2021	Grave New World	Commercial Voice Over (voice)	Mini-series, Episode: "Taxis, Conspiracies, Editors"
2021	Comedians Giving Lectures	Herself - Guest Speaker	Episode: "#2.3"
2022	Halo	Borovoi	Episode: "Allegiance"
2022	Avoidance	Amanda	Episode: "#1.1"
2022	Sky Comedy Shorts	Mr. Whippy	Episode: "Real Friends" (also writer)
2023	EastEnders	DS Gaunt	Episode: "#1.6796"
2023	Sorry, I Didn't Know	Herself - Panellist	Episode: "#4.5"
2024	World's Most Dangerous Roads	Herself - Guest	Episode: "Colorado" (with Desiree Burch)
2024	Pointless Celebrities	Herself - Contestant	Episode: "#16.16"
2024	Travel Man: 48 Hours in...	Herself - Guest	Episode: "Lanzarote"
