= Ignacio Lopez (comedian) =

Spanish and Welsh comedian

- Born: Ignacio Vincent Lopez McGarry; 8 August 1986 (age 40); Palma de Mallorca, Spain
- Education: International Film School Wales

Comedy career
- Years active: 2011–present
- Medium: Stand-up
- Subjects: British and Spanish cultures, Nine Inch Nails, horror films
- Website: Official website

Ignacio Vincent Lopez McGarry (born 8 August 1986) is a Spanish and Welsh comedian. His material includes observations on the differences between Britain and Spain, while he has also done shows on his love of Nine Inch Nails and horror films, and on mental health and neurodiversity.

Lopez took part on ITV talent show Show Me the Funny in 2011. In 2023, he performed on Live at the Apollo and featured on Have I Got News for You. He has also taken part on celebrity game shows.

== Early life ==
Lopez was born in Palma de Mallorca and raised in Pollença, also on Mallorca. His father was born in a Spanish family in Morocco, and his mother is from Pontardawe in Wales and is of Irish descent. He was raised between Spain and Wales. He is a British citizen, and identifies as European over a nationality.

Lopez's parents owned a bar, and their satellite package to show football also included comedy shows, which he became obsessed with. He began making comic books, comedic plays and jokes. He attended the International Film School Wales in Caerleon near Newport. After graduating, he worked at a cinema in Swansea and was persuaded by his colleagues to do stand-up.

== Stand-up career ==
Lopez's comedy material includes subjects such as the differences between Britain and Spain. He also jokes about his childhood, young adulthood, and experiences in Spain and Britain.

In 2023, Lopez performed a touring show called "Nine Ig Fails", in which he told the story of how he raised money to see Nine Inch Nails on what was due to be their final show, in Los Angeles in 2009. Jay Richardson of comedy website Chortle gave Lopez's show three stars out of five, finding him to be "personable and charming throughout" but finding the stories "[not] that impactful, the stakes never feeling that high".

Lopez's 2025 show "Señor Self-Destruct" toured 40 venues and was based on self-improvement, as he had observed that comedy touring had affected his body and mind. He summed up his show as "The world is on fire and I can't fix that but I will tell you my best jokes about British tourists, Spanish horror stories and the origins of music festivals". His show received a four-star review in The List in 2025, also from Richardson. The reviewer found the subjects such as horror films to be more relatable than Nine Inch Nails and praised Lopez's discussion of neurodiversity and mental health.

In late 2026, Lopez toured the show Nada. It was split into two halves, with the first half based on audience interactions. In the second half, Lopez plays a private detective who solves a case in the town, with plot points based on the people he interacted with, and a projector showing sites and other things that they mentioned. Mark Clegg of Reviews Hub praised the sharpness of Lopez's improvised comedy, while saying that his cultural observational humour was the best part.

== Television work ==
Lopez appeared on Show Me the Funny, a 2011 ITV talent show for comedians. The Guardian critic Stuart Jeffries wrote that the only point he laughed in the whole programme was Lopez introducing himself as a barman the audience had slept with in Magaluf, but noted that the joke did not impress an all-female audience in Liverpool. Lopez was the first contestant to be eliminated, by the judging panel of Kate Copstick, Alan Davies and Jimmy Tarbuck. Copstick found it interesting that Lopez began his set in character as a lothario, but noted that this turned into observations on Liverpool. Lopez reflected that he had been "sloppy".

In February 2023, Lopez was the headline act on the final episode of a series of the BBC's Live at the Apollo. He appeared on Have I Got News for You in October 2023. In 2024, he took part on Pointless Celebrities, Richard Osman's House of Games, QI, and Celebrity Mastermind, with his specialist subject on the latter being Nine Inch Nails.

In September 2024, Lopez and Michelin-starred chef Nieves Barragán Mohacho took part in The Spanish Job by Channel 4 and Estrella Galicia, in which they converted a British pub into a Spanish taverna by changing its menu and decoration.
