= Judi Love =

English comedian and presenter (born 1980)

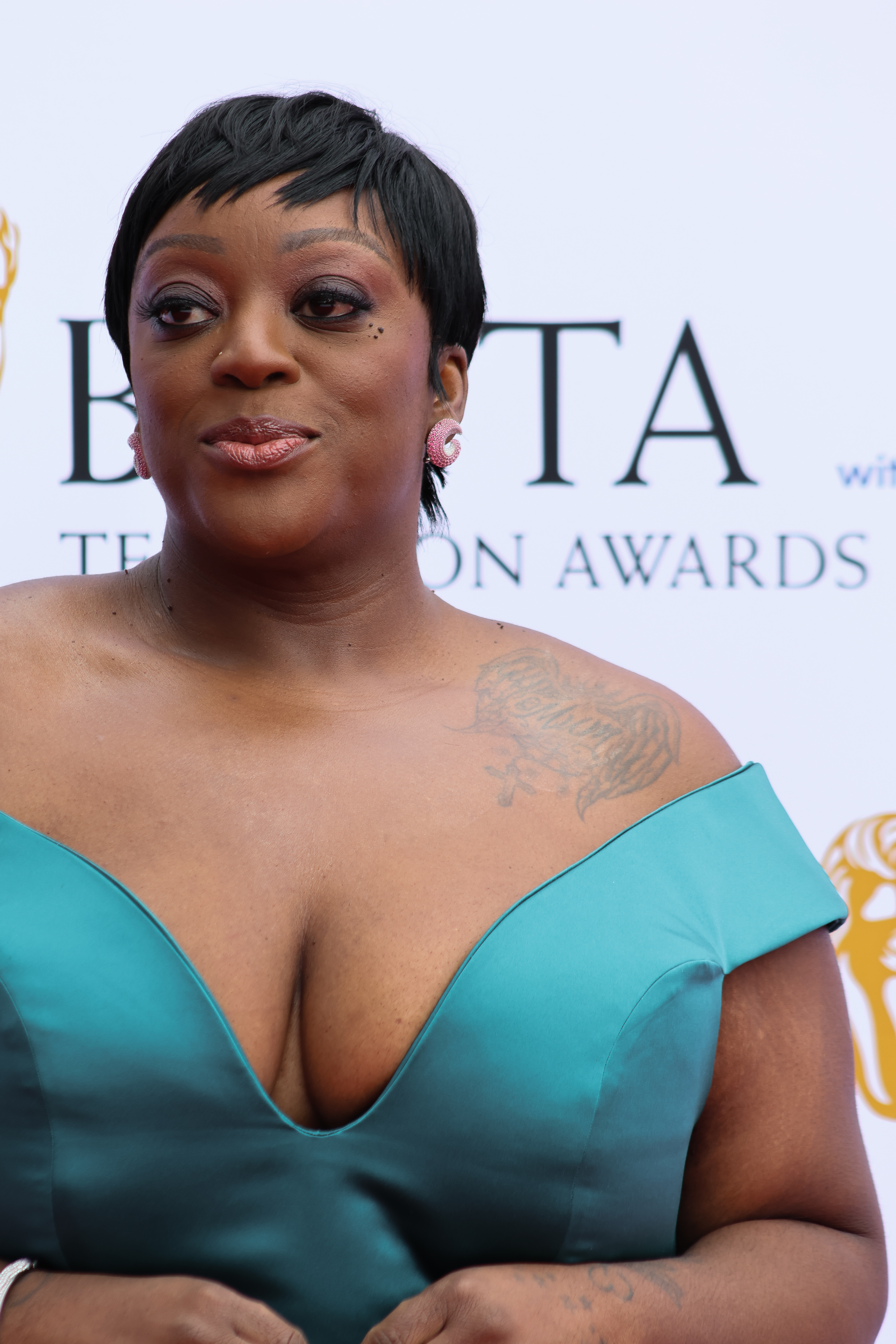
- Love in 2026
- Born: Judy Veronica Thomas; 4 June 1980 (age 46); Hackney, London, England
- Education: Tavistock Institute (BA, MSW)
- Occupations: Comedian; presenter
- Years active: 2011–present
- Children: 2
- Website: www.judilove.co.uk

Judi Love (born Judy Veronica Thomas; 4 June 1980) is an English stand-up comedian and presenter. She is a regular panellist on the ITV talk show Loose Women. In 2020, Love appeared on the first all-black panel in the show's 25-year history, alongside Charlene White, Brenda Edwards, and Kéllé Bryan; the panel has appeared many times since then. She competed on the BBC competition series MasterChef, finishing in third place; the nineteenth series of Strictly Come Dancing, finishing in tenth place; and the thirteenth series of Taskmaster, finishing in last place.

== Early and personal life ==
Love was born on 4 June 1980 in Hackney, London, where she now lives, to Jamaican parents and is the youngest of five children. She spent the majority of her youth in and around the East London area. Love studied a degree in Community Arts and Social Science and a Masters in Social Work from the Tavistock Institute.

== Career ==
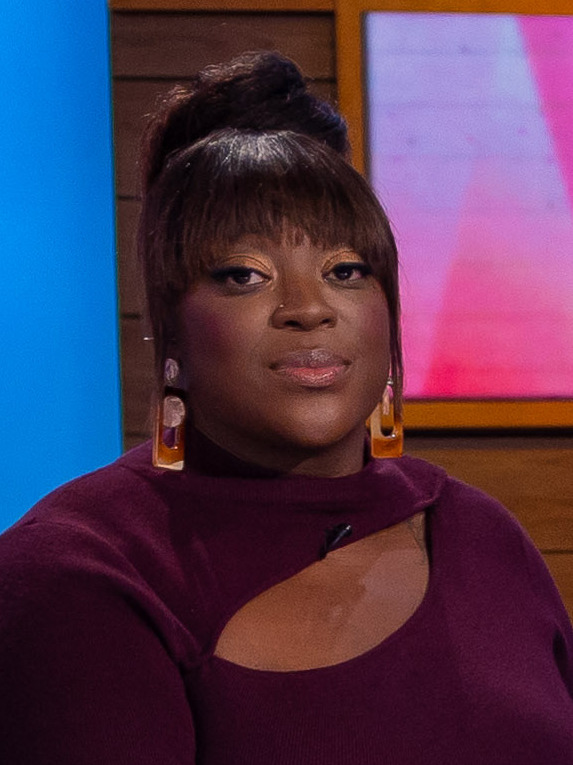
Love on the Loose Women panel in May 2024

Love began comedy when she performed a set in front of her class for a module, in which she revealed the comedic side of caring for her mother, who died in 2009 from dementia. In 2011, Love made her professional stage debut with a show titled Laughter Is Healing. Love hosted the 2019 London Critics' Circle Awards, and in 2020, she began appearing as a panellist on the ITV talk show Loose Women. Love also appeared on Celebrity MasterChef in July 2020, in which she was a finalist. In 2021, Love was announced as a contestant on the nineteenth series of Strictly Come Dancing. She was eliminated on 31 October 2021, finishing in tenth place. Love then starred in series 13 of Taskmaster. On occasion, she deputises for regular DJs on BBC Radio 2.

In March 2025, she starred in the first series of LOL: Last One Laughing UK, hosted by Jimmy Carr & Roisin Conaty, alongside Richard Ayoade, Sara Pascoe, Lou Sanders, Rob Beckett, Bob Mortimer, Joe Wilkinson, Joe Lycett, Daisy May Cooper & Harriet Kemsley.

== Filmography ==
Year	Title	Role	Notes
2015	Pranksterz	Herself	Reoccurring role (series 1)
2018	King Gary	Furniture Shop Owner	1 episode
2019	8 Out of 10 Cats	Herself	1 episode
2019	Harry Hills Club Nite	Herself	1 episode
2019–2020	Don't Hate the Playaz	Herself	2 episodes
2020	Comedy Against Living Miserable	Herself	One-off special
2020	The Stand Up Sketch Show	Herself	Series regular
2020	Celebrity MasterChef	Contestant	Third place
2020	Celebrity Karaoke Club	Herself	2 episodes
2020	Comedy Game Night	Herself	1 episode
2020	Hey Tracey!	Herself	1 episode
2020–present	Loose Women	Panelist	Series regular
2020–present	Jon Richardson's Channel Hopping	Herself	Series regular
2020–2021	Sorry, I Didn't Know	Team Captain	Series regular
2021	The Ranganation	Herself	1 episode
2021	Hypothetical	Herself	1 episode
2021	Mel Giedroyc: Unforgivable	Herself	1 episode
2021	Big Zuu's Big Eats	Herself	Guest
2021	Strictly Come Dancing	Herself	Contestant
2021	Celebrity Catchphrase	Herself	Contestant
2021	RuPaul's Drag Race UK	Herself	Guest
2021	Blankety Blank	Herself	Panellist
2021	The Big Fat Quiz of the Year	Herself	Panellist
2021–present	Celebrity Gogglebox	Herself; alongside Charlene White	Black to front special, series 4 and 5
2021–present	This Is My House	Herself	Panellist
2022	Taskmaster	Herself	Contestant, series 13
2022	8 Out of 10 Cats Does Countdown	Herself	Contestant
2022	Would I Lie to You	Herself	Contestant
2022	The Wheel	Herself	Expert
2022	Noughts + Crosses	Chidi	Recurring role (season 2)
2023	The Great Stand Up to Cancer Bake Off	Herself	Contestant
2024	Sweetpea	Stella	2 episodes
2024	Judi Love's Culinary Cruise	Herself	Presenter
2025	LOL: Last One Laughing UK	Herself	Contestant
2025	90 Day Fiancé: UK Tell All	Herself	Host
2026	Celebrity Sabotage	Herself	Presenter/Celebrity Saboteur

== See also ==
- List of Strictly Come Dancing contestants
