= Leila Navabi =

Welsh writer and comedian

- Born: December 19, 1998 (age 27)
- Occupations: Comedian, writer
- Known for: Composition

Leila Navabi is a Welsh comedian and writer. She has participated in several comedy projects with the BBC, as well as performed two shows at the Edinburgh Festival Fringe in 2023 and 2025, respectively.

== Career ==
As a teenager, Navabi left Cardiff following her experience of being outed by an ex, and moved to London to both watch and perform stand-up comedy. In 2022, Navabi then released a half-hour BBC documentary, titled Funny, Gay & Welsh, regarding such experiences of growing up, coming out, and being a queer performer in Cardiff.

In 2019, Navabi joined the Comedy audio team at BBC Studios Productions as a producer. Later, in 2021, Navabi co-hosted a science-based television series for children alongside comedian Ken Cheng. The same year, Navabi co-wrote the BBC comedy Vandullz with writer Sion Edwards

In 2023, Navabi made her sold-out debut at Fringe with Composition. The Guardian gave it three out of five stars, while The Skinny gave it four. Stylist called it one of the best women-led shows at the festival.

In 2025, Navabi returned to Fringe with her show, Relay, which was written and performed by herself, directed by Elan Isaac, and produced by TEAM Collective Cymru. At Fringe, it was supported by the Sherman Theatre and Pleasance Theatre. The show was "a musical about starting a family with your best friend's sperm" and was inspired by Navabi's misdiagnosis of infertility a few years beforehand. The Guardian called it one of the "10 Best Shows to catch" at the Edinburgh Fringe for 2025.

== Controversies ==
In 2020, following Rishi Sunak's commissioning of a new fifty pence design, Navabi drew criticism for her comments on Radio Wales' The Leak by stating that Sunak looked like "Prince Charles in brownface" and was not representative of her as a brown person. She then stated, generally, that Sunak did not represent anyone other than those with immense wealth.
