= Kae Kurd =

British-Kurdish stand-up comedian (born 1990)

- Born: Korang Abdulla; 1990 (age 35–36); Saqqez, Kurdistan, Iran
- Occupation: Comedian
- Years active: 2011–present
- Known for: Edinburgh Festival
- Notable work: Kurd Your Enthusiasm

Korang Abdulla (born 1990), known professionally as Kae Kurd, is a British-Kurdish stand-up comedian and writer. He performed his show Kurd Your Enthusiasm at the Edinburgh Festival Fringe 2017. He has featured as a guest on the BBC Asian Network and has written for the i and Total Politics. As of 2017, he is the UK's only professional standup comedian from a Kurdish background.

== Early life ==
Kurd came to Britain at 6 months old as a refugee. His parents had been part of the Kurdish resistance movement against Saddam Hussein's Iraqi government and were forced to flee as refugees.

"At my age, my father was running at tanks", he told one interviewer. Due to the Anfal campaign against Kurds in Iraq, Kurd's parents fled to Iran, where Kurd was born in 1990. Partly as a result of his father being injured in a poison gas attack in Iraq, his family were accepted as refugees and settled in Brixton, South London, where he still lives.

== Stand-up comedy ==
Kurd's stage name came initially from the fact that his classmates at school could not pronounce his name. People would introduce him as "K, he's a Kurd". After he was then announced on stage as 'Kae Kurd', decided he liked the name and adopted it as his Twitter handle. He told Festmag that, "I'm not complaining. It's nice to have some separation of your identity and stage persona."

Kurd's comedy focuses on issues of race, identity, and growing up Kurdish in the UK. He started out on the black comedy circuit in 2011 and some of his material revolves around imagining white comedians trying to pitch their routines to a black audience. As someone from a nation without an independent state, "your whole existence is about trying to find an identity or to speak up for your identity", Kurd said. Reviewing his Edinburgh comedy show, Chortle noted Kurd as 'One to watch.'

In 2021, Kurd began a legal case for libel against fellow comedian Darius Davies over allegations by Davies that Kurd had plagiarised his material.

In March 2023, Kurd announced his first UK headline tour, set to take place in September 2023.

== Television ==
Kurd has made various television appearances, notably two performances on Live at the Apollo.

Kurd appeared as a contestant on episodes 76–80 of the fourth series of BBC Two's Richard Osman's House of Games.

In June 2021, he appeared on Mock the Week. In August 2022, he appeared on Celebrity Masterchef, becoming the second contestant to be eliminated in his heat.

== Writing ==
Kurd has written on numerous television shows, including BBC Two's Cunk on.., Charlie Brooker's Antiviral Wipe on BBC Two and Death to 2020 on Netflix; Channel 4's Tez O'Clock Show; Redknapp's Home Fixture, Redknapp's Big Night Out and Series 15 of A League of Their Own on Sky One. He has also written for BAMOUS on BBC Three and Have I Got News For You on BBC One.
