= Josh Pugh =

English stand-up comedian

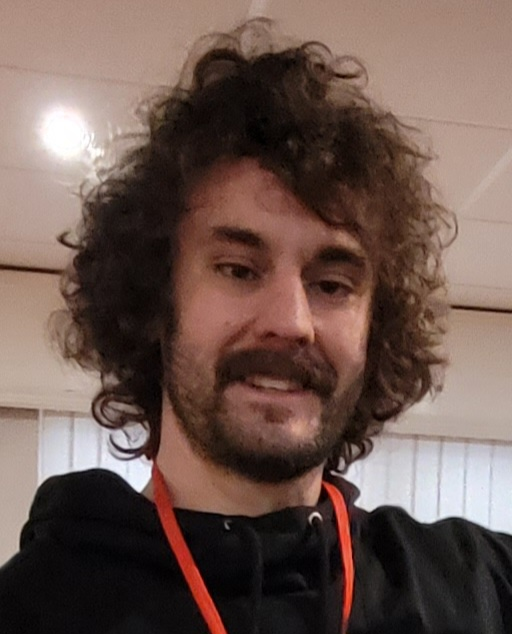
- Pugh in February 2024
- Born: 20 August 1989 (age 37); Atherstone, Warwickshire, England
- Occupation: Stand-up comedian
- Years active: 2014–present
- Children: 2
- Website: Josh Pugh on X

Josh Pugh (born 20 August 1989) is an English stand-up comedian, England Para-footballer, and actor.

== Life and career ==
Pugh was born in Nuneaton in 1989 and grew up in Atherstone, Warwickshire.

Pugh began performing in 2014. He won new act competitions in both Birmingham Comedy Festival and Nottingham comedy festival in 2015, the Midland new act of the year in both 2014 and 2015, and the English Comedian of the Year in 2016. He has appeared on Mock the Week, Hypothetical, Rosie Jones's Disability Comedy Extravaganza, Question Team, Mel Giedroyc: Unforgivable and Live at the Apollo. As an actor, he appeared on Sneakerhead.

Pugh has written for several shows, including 8 Out of 10 Cats Does Countdown, Never Mind The Buzzcocks, Newsjack and The Now Show. Pugh was part of the Channel 4 presentation team for the 2024 Paralympic Games. He hosts a podcast, Josh And Phil's Knowledge Club, with Phil Pagett. In 2025, Pugh appeared as Mark in the fourth episode of How Are You? It's Alan (Partridge).

== Filmography ==
=== Film ===
Year	Title	Role	Notes	Ref.
2026	Finding Emily	Piccadilly Records Manager		

=== Television ===
Year	Title	Role	Notes	Ref.
2023	The Power of Parker	Lee		
2024	2024 Summer Paralympics	Presenter		
2025	Mitchell and Webb Are Not Helping	Andy		
2025	How Are You? It's Alan (Partridge)	Mark		

== Personal life ==
Pugh is partially sighted and has played for England's Partially Sighted football team between 2012 and 2022. He lives in Atherstone with his wife; they had a child in December 2021 via IVF. In 2024, he was invited to start the annual Shrove Tuesday Atherstone Ball Game, held on 13 February of that year, by throwing the ball into the crowd in the town's Long Street.
