= Janine Harouni =

American comedian

- Born: 3 January 1988 (age 38); New York City, New York, U.S.
- Spouse: Andrew Nolan
- Children: 1
- Website: Official website

Janine Harouni (born 3 January 1988) is a UK-based American stand-up comedian and actress.

== Early life ==
Harouni was raised in Staten Island, New York City by a Lebanese-American father, while her mother is predominantly of Italian and Irish descent.

In 2009, Harouni was involved in a car accident in Manhattan. The car she and her friends were in pulled onto the hard shoulder after a puncture and another car crashed into them at 70mph. Harouni broke her pelvis, femur, legs, and wrists. Her sciatic nerve was crushed which paralysed her right leg for nearly three years. She moved to London in 2012.

== Career ==
=== Stand-up comedy ===
In 2018, Harouni won the Laughing Horse New Act of the Year. She won the BBC New Comedy Award in 2019.

In 2019, Harouni performed a well received debut show, Stand Up with Janine Harouni (Please Remain Seated) at the Edinburgh Festival Fringe. She was nominated for the Best Newcomer Award at that year's Edinburgh Comedy Awards. She returned to the Fringe in 2023, performing Man'oushe while heavily pregnant, and was nominated for the main Edinburgh Comedy Award.

=== Acting ===
Harouni played Thalia in the ITV show Buffering from 2021–2023, and appeared as Carla Diaz in The Batman (2022).

== Personal life ==
She is married to Irish comedian and filmmaker Andrew Nolan. Her son was born in October 2023.

== Filmography ==
=== Film ===
| Year | Title | Role | Notes |
|---|---|---|---|
| 2014 | A Viewfinder | Luz | Short films |
| 2017 | Anti Social: Comic Relief | Mel | Short films |
| 2018 | Colette | Jeanne de Caillavet | |
| 2018 | Beast | American Mum | Short film |
| 2022 | The Batman | Carla Diaz | |
| 2022 | The People We Hate at the Wedding | Young Woman at Airport | |
| 2023 | Thin Skinned | Jess Keaton | Short film |

=== Television ===
| Year | Title | Role | Notes |
|---|---|---|---|
| 2017 | Bucket | Yoga Teacher | Episode #1.4 |
| 2018 | Patrick Melrose | Funeral Parlour Receptionist | Episode: "Bad News" |
| 2018 | Modern Horror Stories | Kara / Jeanette / Shopper / Doctor / Lauren / Samantha | 6 episodes |
| 2018–2020 | BBC3 Quickies | Janine | 5 episodes |
| 2019 | Soft Border Patrol | Miss Truth | Episode: "The Light That Guides You Through" |
| 2019 | Modern Horror Stories Does Comic Relief | Various | 3 episodes |
| 2019 | Super Unit | Winter Leigh | Episode: "Bumfield Council Division" |
| 2019 | Very Valentine | Pamela | Television film |
| 2021 | Yesterday, Today & the Day Before | Herself - Guest | Episode #1.5 |
| 2021 | The Russell Howard Hour | Herself - Guest | Episode #5.2 |
| 2021 | Soho Theatre Live | Herself - Performer | Episode: "Janine Harouni: Please Remain Seated" |
| 2021 | The Emily Atack Show | Various | 2 episodes |
| 2021 | Comedians Giving Lectures | Herself - Guest Lecturer | Episode #2.2 |
| 2021–2023 | Buffering | Thalia | 11 episodes |
| 2021–2023 | The Stand Up Sketch Show | Various | 6 episodes |
| 2022 | The John Bishop Show | Herself - Correspondent | Episode #1.3 |
| 2022 | Jazz Emu | Pastrischa | Television pilot |
| 2022 | Avoidance | Riley | Episode #1.5 |
| 2022 | Question Team | Herself - Panellist | Episode #2.4 |
| 2022 | Extract. Destroy. Repeat. | Herself | Television short film |
| 2022-2023 | CelebAbility | Herself - Special Guest | 2 episodes |
| 2023 | Pointless Celebrities | Herself - Contestant | Episode #15.25 |
| 2024 | Plot Twist | Herself - Guest | Podcast; Episode: "Janine Harouni" |
| 2024 | The Franchise | Meg Coker | Episode: "Scene 54: The Lilac Ghost" |
| 2024 | Bob's Burgers | Dania (voice) | Episode: "Colon-ly the Dronely" |
| 2024 | The Last Leg | Herself - Guest | Episode #32.4 |
| 2024 | Rhod Gilbert's Growing Pains | Herself - Guest | Episode #6.6 |
| 2025 | Live at the Apollo | Herself - Special Guest | Episode #19.7 |
| 2026 | Star Search | Herself - Contestant | Netflix reboot; Season 1 |
| 2026 | Celebrity Mastermind | Herself - Contestant | Episode #24.11 |
| 2026 | Mock the Week | Herself - Panellist | 4 episodes |
| 2026 | Russell Howard's Five Brilliant Things | Herself - Guest | Podcast; Episode: "Janine Harouni" |
| 2026 | Twenty Twenty Six | Amy Huffman | Episode: "Ambassador" |
| 2026 | Trying | Bonnie | 2 episodes |
| 2026 | Janine Harouni: Man'oushe | Herself - Performer | YouTube Comedy Special |
| 2026 | Meantime | Marina | 6 episodes |

=== Video games ===
| Year | Title | Voice role | Notes |
|---|---|---|---|
| 2016 | Star Ocean: Anamnesis | Hrist | English version |
| 2016 | Star Wars Battlefront Rogue One: X-Wing VR Mission | Red Four | |
| 2017 | The Surge | Mallory, various voices | |
| 2017 | Need for Speed: Payback | Natalia Nova | |
| 2017 | Star Wars: Battlefront II | Voice Talent / Acting Talent | |
| 2017 | Xenoblade Chronicles 2 | Newt | English version |
| 2018 | Forza Horizon 4 | Laracer | |
| 2018 | Insurgency: Sandstorm | Assassin | |
| 2019 | Another Eden: The Cat Beyond Time and Space | Amy | English version |
| 2019 | Tom Clancy's Ghost Recon Breakpoint | Dr. Maggie Hanover | Deep State DLC |
| 2020 | Haven | Yu (Female) | |
| 2022 | Lego Star Wars: The Skywalker Saga | Unknown role | |
| 2026 | The First Descendant | Raven | English version |
