= Emmanuel Sonubi =

British-Nigerian comedian

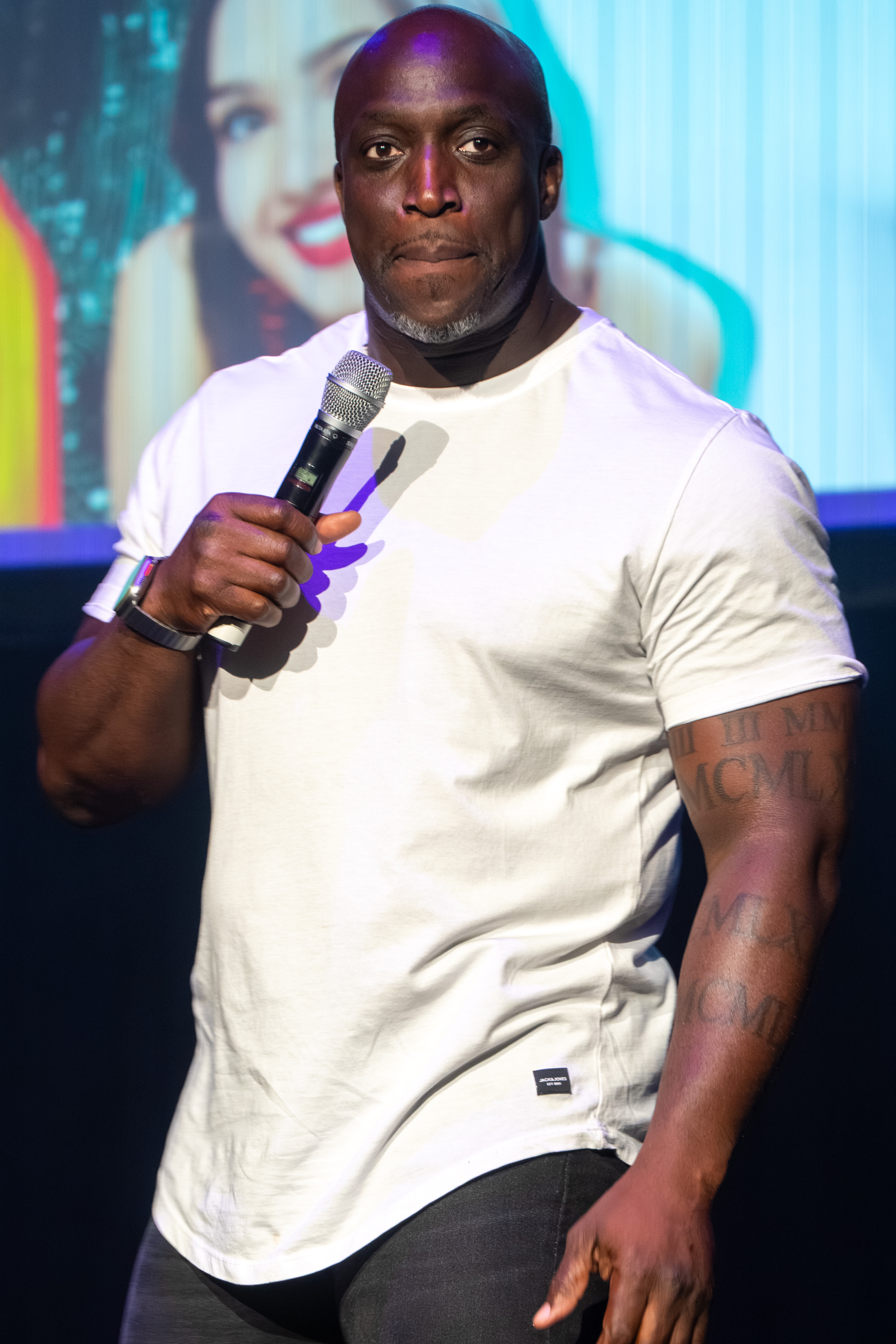
- Born: 1980 or 1981 (age 45–46); London, England
- Notable work: Life After Near Death

Comedy career
- Genre: Standup
- Subjects: Race, organ donation
- Website: emmanuelstandup.com

Emmanuel Sonubi (born 1980 or 1981) is a British-Nigerian comedian based in London, England, where he was born and he was raised in Enfield as the youngest of six children and the only boy.

Before focusing on a career in comedy, he worked as a bouncer and also performed in musical theatre, including playing a leading role in the original cast of the West End musical Daddy Cool in 2007.

His debut as a stand-up comedian was in 2015, and from taking part in open mic nights he quickly went on to performing in national tours and internationally, appearing at numerous high-profile clubs, such as The Comedy Store and The Glee Club, as well as regular shows in Ibiza, Cyprus, Turkey and Holland.

In 2019, he suffered heart failure while performing on stage in Dubai, and that became the basis for a show at the Edinburgh Festival Fringe in 2025 called Life After Near Death. Sonubi has a condition called dilated cardiomyopathy, where his heart does not pump enough oxygen to his body.

Doctors told him that he might need an urgent heart transplant. Upon returning to the United Kingdom, Sonubi discovered that there was a shortage of organ donors matching his background, which he explored through a BBC documentary podcast. Since then, Sonubi has controlled his condition through medication.

Sonubi has toured nationally and made numerous prime-time television appearances, including hosting Live at the Apollo.

Among the recognition he has received are nominations for the Edinburgh Comedy Award for Best Show (2023) and Best Newcomer (2022), a Chortle Award nomination for Best Club Comic (2023), and the Mervyn Stutters Spirit of the Fringe award for best show 2025.
