= Lou Sanders =

English comedian, writer, actress (born 1978)

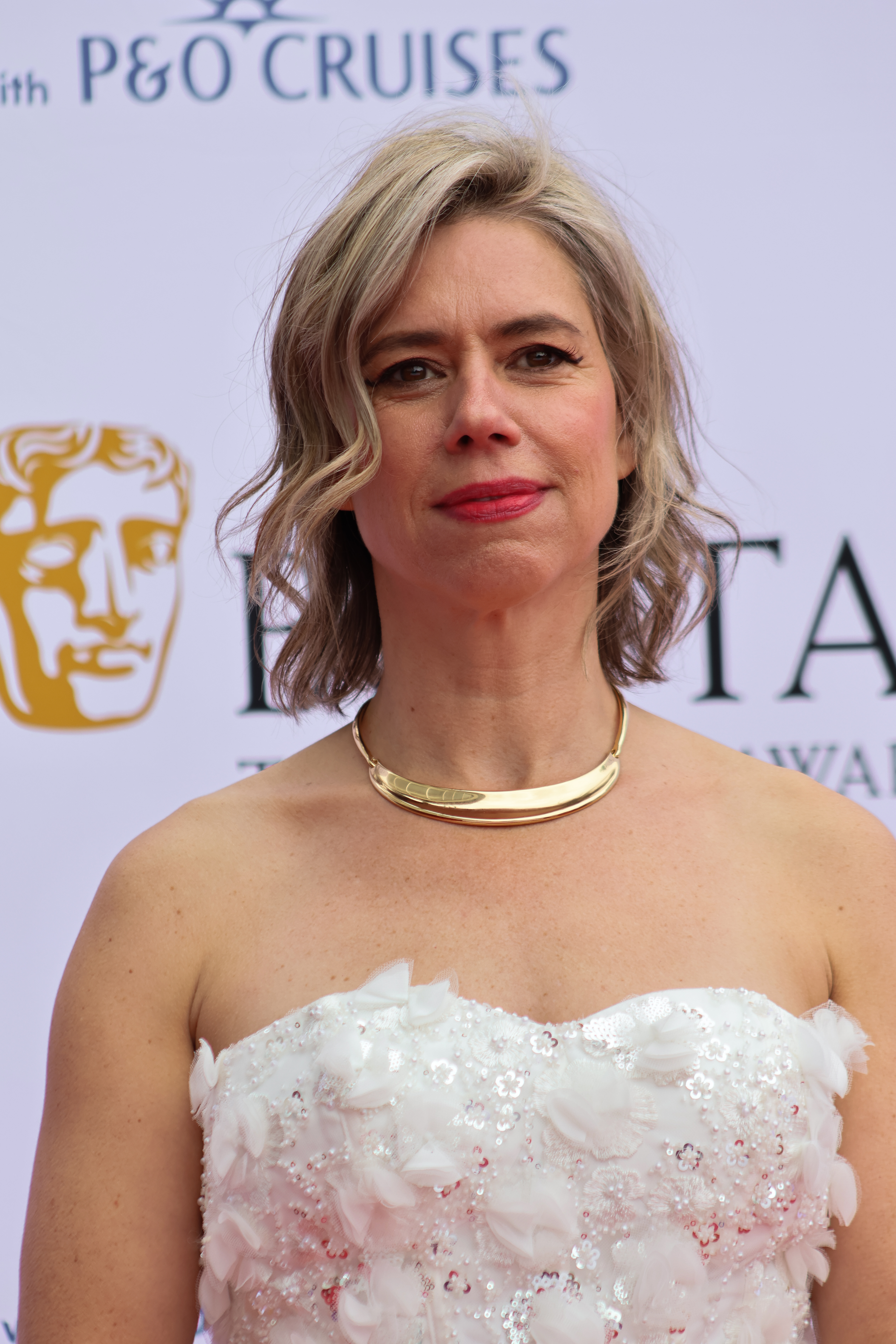
- Sanders in 2026
- Born: Louise Sanders; 24 November 1978 (age 47); Barnstaple, Devon, England
- Education: London Metropolitan University
- Notable work: Taskmaster; Live at the Apollo; Mel Giedroyc: Unforgivable; Dancing on Ice

Comedy career
- Years active: 2009–present
- Medium: Stand-up; television; radio
- Website: lousanders.com

Louise Sanders (born 24 November 1978) is an English stand-up comedian, writer and actress. Since beginning her career in comedy, she has appeared regularly on panel shows, performed on Live at the Apollo and won the eighth series of Taskmaster in 2019. From 2021 to 2024 she was the co-presenter of the Dave panel show Mel Giedroyc: Unforgivable, and she was a contestant on the sixteenth series of Dancing on Ice in 2024.

== Early life ==
Louise Sanders was born on 24 November 1978 in Barnstaple, Devon to Margaret (née Lang) and David Sanders. Her parents divorced when Sanders was two, and she and her older brother were raised in Broadstairs, Kent by her mother and her stepfather, who was a history teacher. Her father was periodically present. Sanders moved out at the age of 15, and later earned a degree in communication and cultural studies from London Metropolitan University.

== Career ==
Before beginning her career in comedy, Sanders worked in administrative roles, including executive PA and complaints-handler at Ofcom. She took comedy classes from Logan Murray, and was paid to write a comedic blog about The Apprentice.

As a live performer, Sanders performs regularly both in the UK and around the world. In 2018, her show Shame Pig was the joint winner of the Comedians' Choice Award for Best Show at the Edinburgh Festival Fringe and she returned to the Festival in 2019 with her show Say Hello to Your New Step Mummy.

Sanders was declared the winner of the eighth series of Taskmaster in 2019; she has also appeared on television shows including QI, Would I Lie to You?, Travel Man, 8 Out of 10 Cats Does Countdown, Hypothetical, The Russell Howard Hour, Jon Richardson: Ultimate Worrier, Alan Davies: As Yet Untitled, 8 Out of 10 Cats, Red Nose Day for Comic Relief, Russell Howard's Good News, Live at the Electric and Question Team. She has also acted in sitcoms including Aisling Bea's This Way Up and Karl Pilkington's Sick of It. She is also a regular guest on BBC Radio 4's The Unbelievable Truth. In 2019, Sanders appeared on BBC Two's Live at the Apollo (series 15, episode 2).

As a writer, Sanders wrote and starred in the short film Elderflower, which co-starred Sheila Reid, Tom Rosenthal and Mike Wozniak. She has also written for 8 Out of 10 Cats, Mock the Week, Stand Up for the Week and Miranda Hart.

Sanders has been an occasional guest host on Elis James and John Robins on BBC Radio 5 Live. In February 2020, Sanders started hosting a podcast called Cuddle Club. From February 2021, she appeared in the Dave comedy panel show Mel Giedroyc: Unforgivable. From April 2022 until September 2023, Sanders hosted Taskmaster: The People's Podcast. In August 2023, Sanders released her autobiography What's That Lady Doing?. In 2024, Sanders appeared as a contestant on the sixteenth series of Dancing on Ice. She was paired with Brendyn Hatfield and they were the fifth couple to be eliminated.

== Personal life ==
Sanders is a teetotaller and a vegan.

== Television ==
Year	Programme	Channel	Notes
2013	Russell Howard's Good News	BBC Three	Series 8, episode 3
2016	Alan Davies: As Yet Untitled	Dave	Series 4, episode 3: "A Penis Poking Through The Window"
2017	Alan Davies: As Yet Untitled	Dave	Series 5, episode 6: "Half of My Special Rose"
2017	Live from the BBC	BBC Three	Series 2, episode 2
2018	Sick of It	Sky One	Series 1, episode 3: "Lonely People", as character Megan
2018	The Dog Ate My Homework	CBBC	Series 5, episode 4
2019	8 Out of 10 Cats	Channel 4	Series 21, episode 6
2019	8 Out of 10 Cats Does Countdown	Channel 4	Series 17, episode 1
2019	Jon Richardson: Ultimate Worrier	Dave	Series 2, episode 4: "Health"
2019	The Russell Howard Hour	Sky Max	Series 2, episode 13
2019	Hypothetical	Dave	Series 1, episode 3
2019	Travel Man	Channel 4	Series 9, episode 2: "Bergen"
2019	This Way Up	Channel 4, Hulu	Series 1, episode 3, as character Fran
2019	Live At the Apollo	BBC Two	Series 15, episode 2
2019, 2022	Taskmaster	Dave / Channel 4	Winner, series 8
2020	QI	BBC Two	Series 17, episode 13: "Quills"
2020	Roast Battle	Comedy Central UK	Series 4, episode 5. With Luke McQueen
2020	Richard Osman's House of Games	BBC Two	Series 3, week 13
2020	Hypothetical	Dave	Series 2, episode 5
2020	Big Zuu's Big Eats	Dave	Series 1, episode 10
2020	The Late Late Show with James Corden	CBS	Episode 732
2021	Would I Lie To You?	BBC One	Series 14, episode 1
2021	Question Team	Dave	Series 1, episode 7
2021	Guessable	Comedy Central UK	Series 2, episode 3: "Alan and a Spread of Meat Loaf"
2021	Between the Covers	BBC	Series 3, episode 2. Chose the book Delicacy by Katy Wix
2021	Alan Davies: As Yet Untitled	Dave	Series 6, episode 9: "The Accuracy of a Pigeon"
2021	Outsiders	Dave	Contestant
2021–24	Mel Giedroyc: Unforgivable	Dave	"Sidekick" to host Mel Giedroyc
2022	Would I Lie To You?	BBC One	Series 15, episode 4
2022	Guessable	Comedy Central UK	Series 3, episode 11: "Sugar Puff Daddy"
2022	Married At First Sight: Unveiled	E4	Episode 6
2022	Question Team	Dave	Series 2, episode 8
2022	CelebAbility	ITV2	Series 6, episode 2
2023	World's Most Dangerous Roads	Dave	Series 4, episode 5: "Iceland". With Ed Gamble
2023	The Weakest Link	BBC One	Series 2, episode 10
2023	Guessable	Comedy Central UK	Series 4, episode 5: "I live and breathe Lou Bega"
2024	Dancing on Ice	ITV	Contestant, series 16
2025-26	LOL: Last One Laughing UK	Amazon Prime Video	Contestant, series 1, Halloween Special
2026	What Have You Done? with Chi + Lucas	BBC	Guest, episode 5
2026	Alice and Steve	Disney+	Season 1, Episode 4 as Nancy
