= Rachel Parris =

English comedian (born 1984)

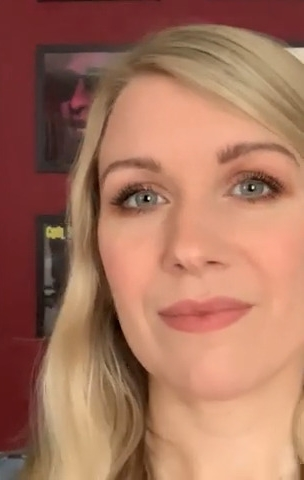
- Parris in 2021
- Born: Rachel Sarah Parris; 1984 (age 41–42); Leicester, England
- Education: St Hilda's College, Oxford (BA); Royal Central School of Speech and Drama (MA)
- Years active: 2007–present
- Spouse: Marcus Brigstocke (m. 2019)
- Children: 1
- Website: www.rachelparris.co.uk

Rachel Sarah Parris (born 1984) is an English comedian, musician, actress and presenter. She hosted the satirical news show Late Night Mash (formerly The Mash Report).

== Early life ==
Parris attended Loughborough High School. She holds an upper second-class (2:1) Music BA from St Hilda's College, Oxford and a master's degree from the Royal Central School of Speech and Drama for acting.

== Career ==
Parris's stand-up comedy has been featured on Live at the Apollo, and she has performed solo shows at the Edinburgh Fringe, including It's Fun To Pretend, which was expanded into a UK tour for 2018/19.

She presented the fourth series of the Game of Thrones spin-off show Thronecast, and A Girl's Guide to TV, a comic guide to how women can get ahead in television, which first aired on BBC2 on 10 June 2018.

As an actor, Parris was cast in the BBC show Murder in Successville, and also appeared on The IT Crowd, Plebs and Count Arthur Strong.

She has been a panellist on QI, I'm Sorry I Haven't a Clue, Would I Lie to You? and Mock the Week. In 2017, she was a guest on Richard Herring's Leicester Square Theatre Podcast, in 2018 she was a guest on Pappy's Flatshare Slamdown podcast, and in 2019 Richard Osman's House of Games.

Parris is a regular guest co-host on the podcast The Guilty Feminist.

Parris was in one episode of Apple TV+'s Trying.

Parris wrote a book published in 2022, Advice from Strangers: Everything I Know from People I Don't Know.

== Improvisational comedy ==
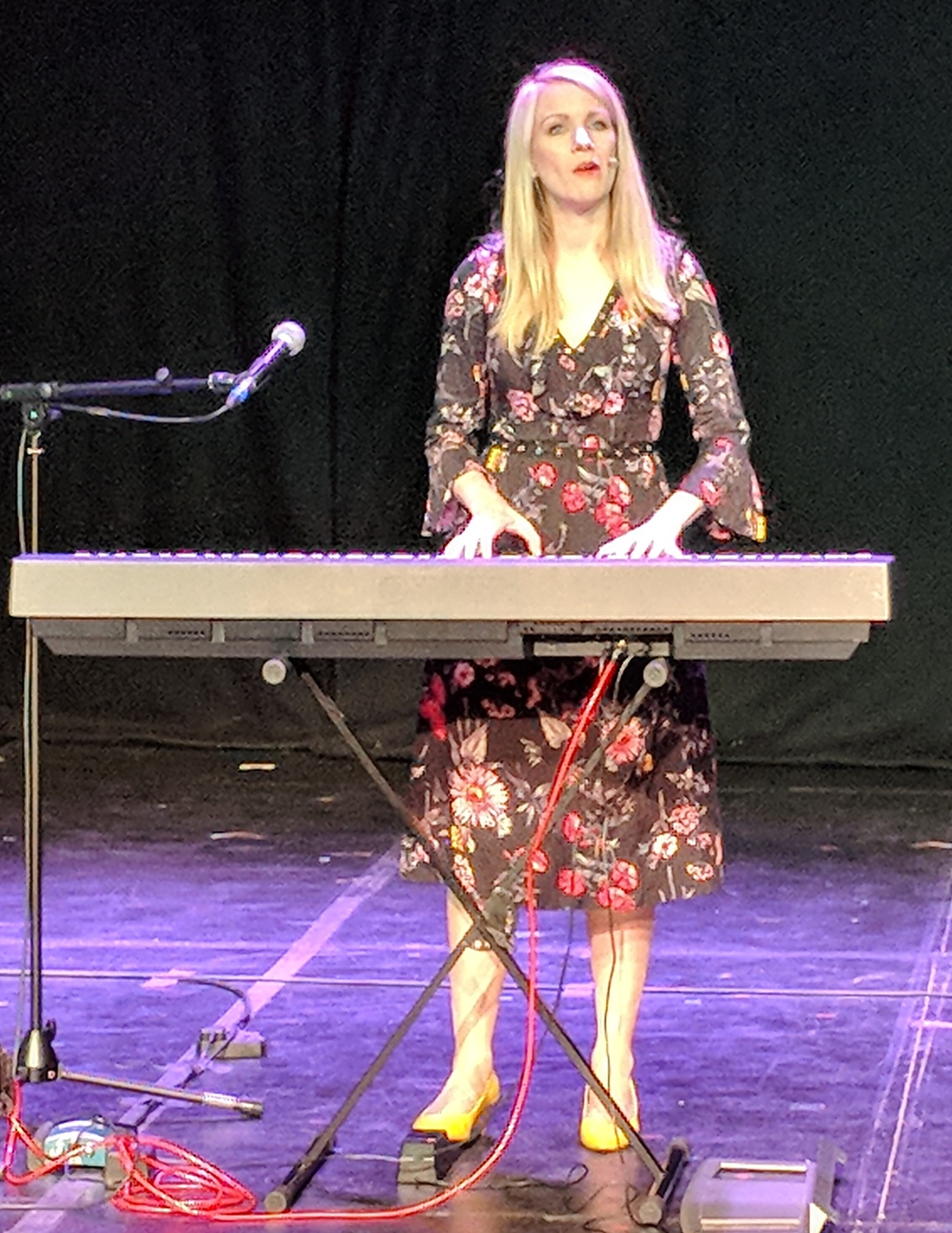
Rachel Parris performing at her Musical Comedy Club show at the Edinburgh Festival Fringe in August 2018

Parris began improv comedy in 2007 with The Oxford Imps and musical comedy in 2010. As part of the Austentatious improv group, she has performed in Edinburgh, London, and on a UK tour, beginning a run at the Fortune Theatre in London from 18 February 2019.

In 2014, Austentatious won the Chortle Award for Best Character, Improv or Sketch Act, and DVDs of their live shows were released by Gofasterstripe in 2015 and 2018.

== Awards ==
In 2019, she was nominated for the BAFTA Television Award for Best Entertainment Performance for her work on The Mash Report.

In 2019, Parris won the Chortle Award for Best Music and Variety Act.

In 2018, Parris was named Female First's Comedian of the Year, beating Tiffany Haddish, Amy Schumer and Ellen DeGeneres to the prize.

She won runner-up placing in the annual Musical Comedy Awards competition in 2012, and has since headlined shows of theirs each year.

== Personal life ==
Parris lives in Balham, south-west London, and is married to fellow comedian Marcus Brigstocke. The couple have a son.

== Television and radio credits ==
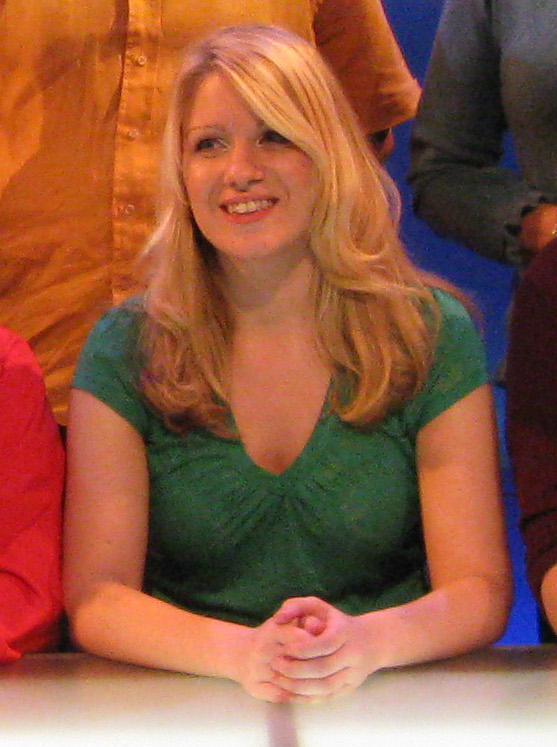
Parris in 2008 as an Eggheads contestant

- Comic Relief, BBC One, 2025
- Richard Osman's House of Games, Champions Week, Series 7, BBC Two, 2024
- Sunday Brunch, Channel 4, 2023
- The Hit List, BBC One, 2022
- Question Team, Dave, 2021
- Late Night Mash, Dave, 2021–present
- Trying, Apple TV+, 2020
- Richard Osman's House of Games, BBC Two, 2019, 2024
- I'm Sorry I Haven't a Clue, BBC Radio 4, 2019–present
- QI, BBC Two, 2019
- Would I Lie To You?, BBC One, 2019
- Hypothetical, Dave, 2019
- Private Passions, BBC Radio 3, 2019
- Live at the Apollo, BBC One, 2018
- Plebs, ITV2, 2018
- QI, BBC Two, 2018
- Mock the Week, BBC Two, 2018
- A Girl's Guide to TV, BBC Two, 2018
- The Mash Report, BBC Two, 2017–2020
- Austentatious, BBC Radio 4, 2017
- The Now Show, BBC Radio 4, 2016
- Murder In Successville, BBC Three, 2015–2016
- Thronecast, Sky Atlantic, 2014
- The IT Crowd, Channel 4, 2013
- Count Arthur Strong, BBC One, 2013
- Eggheads, BBC Two, 2009
