= Jen Brister =

British comedian

- Born: Jennifer Helen Brister; 9 February 1975 (age 51); Kingston upon Thames, London, England
- Education: University of Middlesex
- Occupations: Comedian; writer; actor

Jennifer Helen Brister (born 9 February 1975) is a British stand-up comedian, writer and actor. She is known for her solo shows on the UK and international comedy circuit, her memoir The Other Mother (2019), and her television appearances on programmes such as Live at the Apollo and Mock the Week.

== Life and career ==
=== Early life ===
Brister was born in Kingston upon Thames, Greater London, in 1975 to a British father and a Spanish mother. She has three brothers. Brister was raised as a Catholic and went to all girls' Ursuline High School, Wimbledon. She then went on to Richmond College. Her Spanish-born mother is a frequent topic of her comedy routines.

=== Stand-up career ===
Brister studied drama at Middlesex University, London, where, in the mid-1990s, she took a course in stand-up comedy, the only one of its kind at the time in the UK. Other famous graduates include Alan Carr, Dan Renton Skinner of the Dutch Elm Conservatoire and Shooting Stars, and Clare Warde of the Runaway Lovers. Brister's first gig was at the end of her third year at university in 1996, at the King's Head in Crouch End, London.

Brister has performed internationally, including appearances at the Melbourne Comedy Festival in 2011 and 2014, and at the Adelaide Festival in 2011 and 2012. She has also taken her solo shows to the Edinburgh Festival Fringe and continues to perform regularly in UK clubs such as The Comedy Store (London) and Up the Creek. She toured the UK for the first time in 2018 with her show Meaningless. Since 2022 she has been touring the UK again with her show The Optimist.

Her comedy hero is Victoria Wood.

In 2006, Brister appeared at the 2006 Edinburgh Festival Fringe with her first show Me, My Mum and I. In Time Out, March 2006, Jen stated "It's really an exploration of my relationship with my mum. It's an analysis, as well, of where I am at this point in my life. I'm 31. I'm single. I don't own a house. Or a car. I don't have kids. Or any solid financial security. At 31, my mother had three children and a fourth on the way. She was married and she had a mortgage."

In 2007–2008, Brister worked for BBC Radio 6 Music as a stand-in presenter, and in 2008 she took a show to Edinburgh Fringe Festival called Reception with her comedy partner at the time, Clare Warde. In 2009, Brister appeared at the Edinburgh Fringe, again doing a stand-up show as well as appearing in a play called The One and The Many by Trevor Lock. In 2011, Brister took her second solo show British(ish) to Melbourne, Adelaide and Edinburgh festivals.

In 2012, Brister performed her third solo show Now and Then at the Adelaide and Edinburgh festivals, and in 2013, she performed a sell-out run at Soho Theatre, London. In 2014, Brister took her fourth show Wishful Thinking to the Free Fringe at Edinburgh, and performed it at Soho Theatre. In 2016, Brister performed her fifth show The Other One at the Camden Fringe comedy festival, and in 2017 she performed it at Soho Theatre.

In 2017, Brister performed at BBC Two's Live at The Apollo, aired on 14 December 2017.

In 2018, Brister took her sixth show Meaningless to the Edinburgh festival, where she had a sell-out run. This was the first show she had toured around the UK.

She gave a TED talk at Brighton TEDx in 2018 titled "Changing the way we bring up our boys", addressing the cultural and gender norms taught to children.

Brister supported Frankie Boyle on his 2018 tour and was a panellist on Frankie Boyle's New World Order on BBC Two in 2019. She was a panellist on BBC Radio 4's The News Quiz in September 2018 and May 2019. She is a regular guest on podcasts like The Guilty Feminist, Global Pillage and Drunk Women Solving Crime. She also does her own podcast together with comedian Maureen Younger.

Her 2019 Edinburgh show was called Under Privilege.

In 2020 she was due to take her UK tour of Under Privilege to the Machynlleth Comedy Festival at The Tabernacle, Machynlleth. In May 2020 Brister appeared on the TV panel show Who Said That?.

In November 2021, Brister was a panellist on the BBC show Mock the Week. In January 2022, Brister was a panellist on the BBC show QI. In 2022, Brister launched her eighth tour The Optimist, followed by her ninth tour Reactive in 2025.

=== Writing ===
Brister is also a writer and has contributed to Diva, g3, Standard Issue magazine and The Huffington Post. She has also written for BBC Scotland.

In 2019, Brister published her memoir, The Other Mother: A Wickedly Honest Parenting Tale for Every Kind of Family, through Penguin / Square Peg.

=== Acting ===
Brister's first role in a feature film was in the 2021 horror film Lair, directed by Adam Ethan Crow.

== Personal life ==
Brister and her partner, Chloe Martin, have twin sons born in September 2014. They live in Brighton.
