= Thanyia Moore =

English stand-up comedian

- Born: 20 December 1982 (age 43); London, England
- Occupations: Stand-up comedian, actress
- Years active: 2012–present
- Website: thanyiamoore.co.uk

Thanyia Moore (born 20 December 1982) is an English stand-up comedian and actress.

== Early life ==
Moore grew up in South London to Jamaican parents.

== Career ==
Moore began performing comedy in 2012. In 2013 she was named Best Female Newcomer at the (UK) Black Comedy Awards. In 2018 she won the Funny Women contest. She has appeared on Mock the Week.

As an actress, Moore had a supporting role on the children's TV series Jamie Johnson and also appeared in Pure and The Duchess.

Moore also gives workshops at the Bernie Grant Arts Centre.

Owing to the COVID-19 pandemic she, like many other comedians, did not make her debut at the Edinburgh Fringe until August 2022.
