= Ria Lina =

British comedian (born 1980)

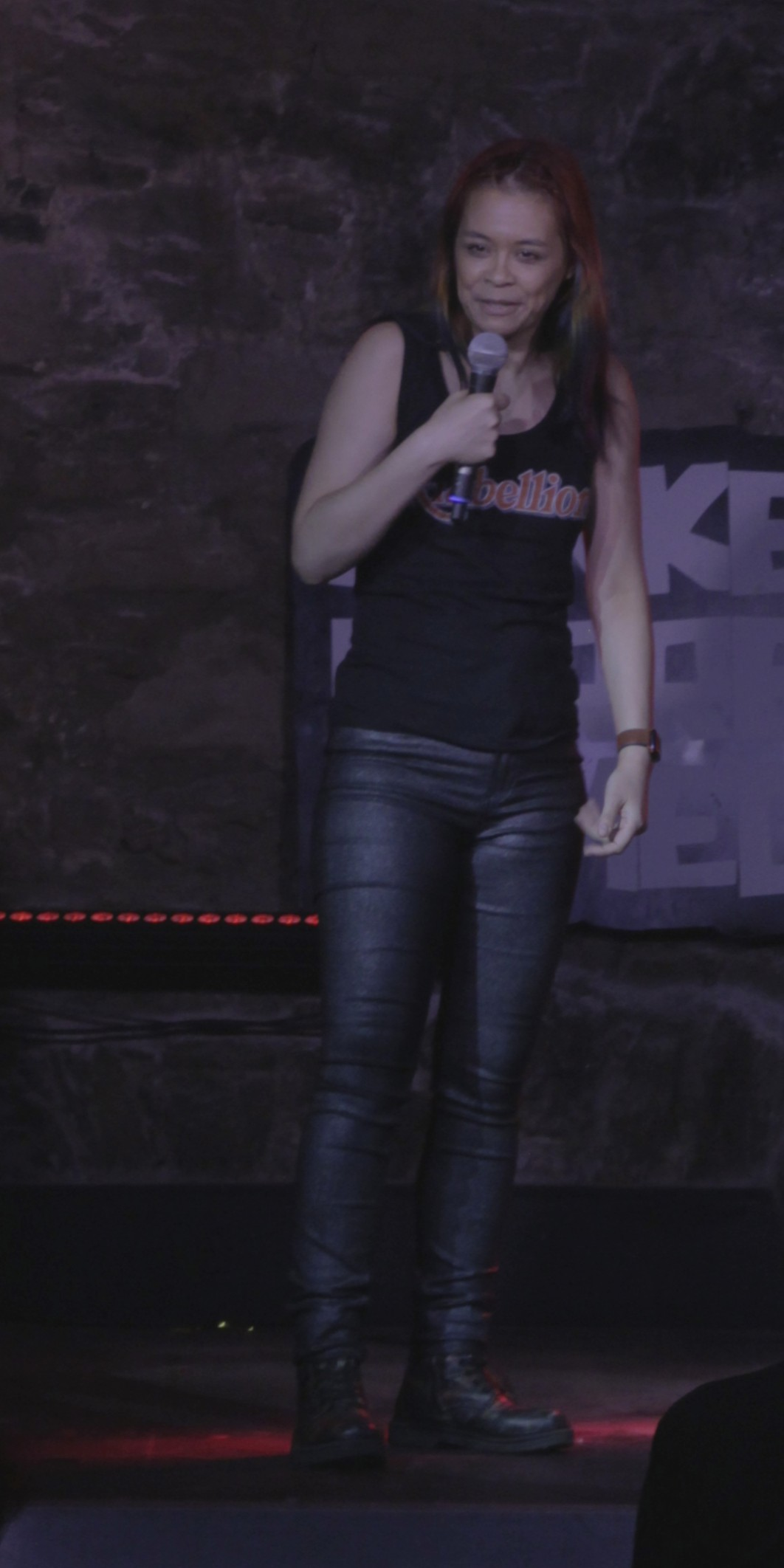
- Ria Lina in "Ria Lina: Rebellion" at Edinburgh Fringe 2025
- Born: 1980 (age 45–46) (Note: Lina's official website states her date of birth, with the year being 1987. That date is utilised by the Funny Women website, in an article on Lina. A different year of birth is indicated in one other source: The Gazette & Essex County Standard reported Lina as being aged 30 in a 2010 article, without specifying her date of birth.); High Wycombe, Buckinghamshire, England
- Notable work: Pointless; Mock the Week; Xenoblade Chronicles 2
- Children: 3

Comedy career
- Years active: 2001–present
- Medium: Stand-up, television, radio
- Genres: Observational comedy, black comedy, satire, wit
- Subjects: Politics, autism, cultures, race relations, science, family, current events
- Website: rialina.com

Ria Lina (born 1980) is a British comedian. She has appeared on Yesterday, Today & The Day Before, Mock the Week, Steph's Packed Lunch, The Now Show, The News Quiz, and Have I Got News for You. In 2003, she won an Ethnic Multicultural Media Academy award for Best Comedian.

== Early life ==
Lina's mother is from the Philippines and her father from Germany. She attended an American school in the Netherlands from the age of 14.

== Career ==
Lina earned a BSc in pathology from the University of St Andrews, an MSc in forensic science from London South Bank University and a PhD in virology (Herpesviridae) from University College London.

== Stand-up ==
In 2003, Lina was a runner-up at the first Funny Women Awards.

Lina has taken six shows to the Edinburgh Festival Fringe. School of Riason (2014) was nominated for the Amused Moose Laughter Awards, and contained one of Dave's Top 10 Jokes of the Fringe, and was later broadcast on BBC Radio 4 in 2016. Lina's Dear Daughter (2016) won the Best Comedy award at the Greater Manchester Fringe. Her other shows include Taboo Raider (2017), Thpethial (2013) and It's Not Easy Being Yellow (2012).

== Television, radio and podcasts ==
Appearances include Yesterday Today and the Day Before, Mock the Week, Steph's Packed Lunch, The Dog Ate My Homework, Sky News, Talk Radio, Talk Radio Europe, The Now Show, The News Quiz, Richard Osman's House of Games,, Evil Genius, Times Radio, Breaking the News, and QI

Further TV work includes Jongleurs Live, The World Stands Up, Sweet 'n' Sour Comedy, Meet The Blogs, Malai Monologues, the film short Christie, and the documentary, A Bit of Oriental.

Lina voiced the character Perun in Xenoblade Chronicles 2. She also narrated and voiced the character Zoe in the full-cast audiobook of cli-fi (climate fiction) adventure MOOJAG and the Auticode Secret by N.E. McMorran / Spondylux Press, London 2020.

Lina appeared in and won Episode 4 of the 21st series of Celebrity Mastermind, broadcast in January 2023. She was one of Alexander Armstrong's co-hosts on Pointless in 2023.

Since 2022, Lina has appeared as a guest co-host of The Bugle podcast.

== Personal life ==
Lina has two sons, a daughter and a stepson She married Steve Jones in 2002. Now divorced, Lina and her ex-husband continue to share their London household as of 2024. She is autistic, something she only became aware of in adulthood.

== Awards ==
- Winner of the Best Comedy Award Greater Manchester Fringe 2016 for her show Dear Daughter
- Finalist Amused Moose Comedy Award 2014
- Winner of the Best Comedy/Comedian Ethnic Multicultural Media Academy Award 2003
- Winner of the King of Kings Comedy Store Award 2003
- BBC New Comedy Awards 2003 semi-finalist
- Daily Telegraph Open Mic Award 2002 finalist
- Wilkinson Sword Cutting Edge of Comedy 2002 finalist
