= Maisie Adam =

English stand-up comedian (born 1994)

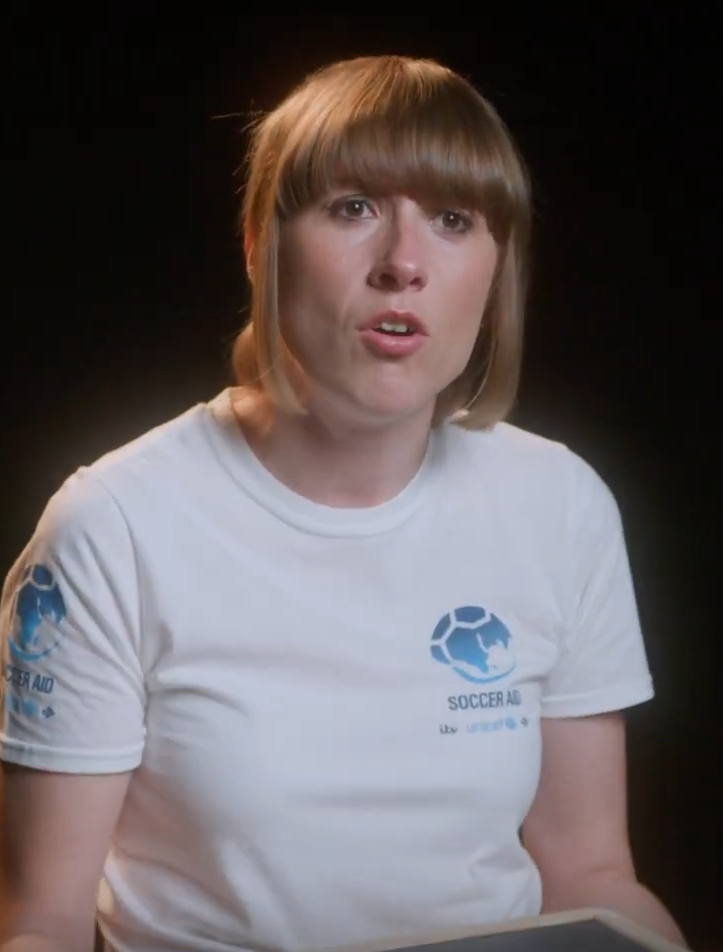
- Adam in 2022
- Born: Maisie Elizabeth Adam; 24 January 1994 (age 32); Pannal, North Yorkshire, England
- Education: East 15 Acting School (BA)
- Occupation: Comedian
- Years active: 2016–present
- Spouse: Mike Dobinson (m. 2023)
- Relatives: Lawrence Byford (grandfather); Mark Byford (uncle)
- Website: maisieadam.com

Maisie Elizabeth Adam (born 24 January 1994) is an English stand-up comedian.

== Early life ==
Maisie Elizabeth Adam was born on 24 January 1994 in Pannal, North Yorkshire. She grew up in nearby Harrogate, with her parents Phillip and Jill Adam, and her younger brother Daniel. Adam's mother previously worked for Leeds Beckett University and is the founder and executive director of the Louder Than Words Festival in Manchester. In 1999, Adam's parents were charged with felony abuse for leaving their two children unattended in a Florida hotel room for 45 minutes; they spent the night in jail before returning to England. The charges were widely criticized for being unreasonable.

Adam's maternal grandfather, Sir Lawrence Byford, led an inquiry into the failings of the hunt for the "Yorkshire Ripper". Her uncle, Mark Byford, was Deputy Director General of the British Broadcasting Corporation and head of BBC Journalism from 2004 to 2011. At 14, Adam was diagnosed with juvenile myoclonic epilepsy.

Adam attended St Aidan's Church of England High School in Harrogate, where she was Head Girl. She trained with the National Youth Theatre in 2010 and 2012 and went on to study acting at the East 15 Acting School in Southend on Sea. She won a Laurence Marks sitcom-writing mentorship in 2015, and graduated with a BA in Acting & Community Theatre in 2016.

== Career ==
A trained actress, Adam initially planned on acting and writing professionally.

=== Stand-up comedy ===
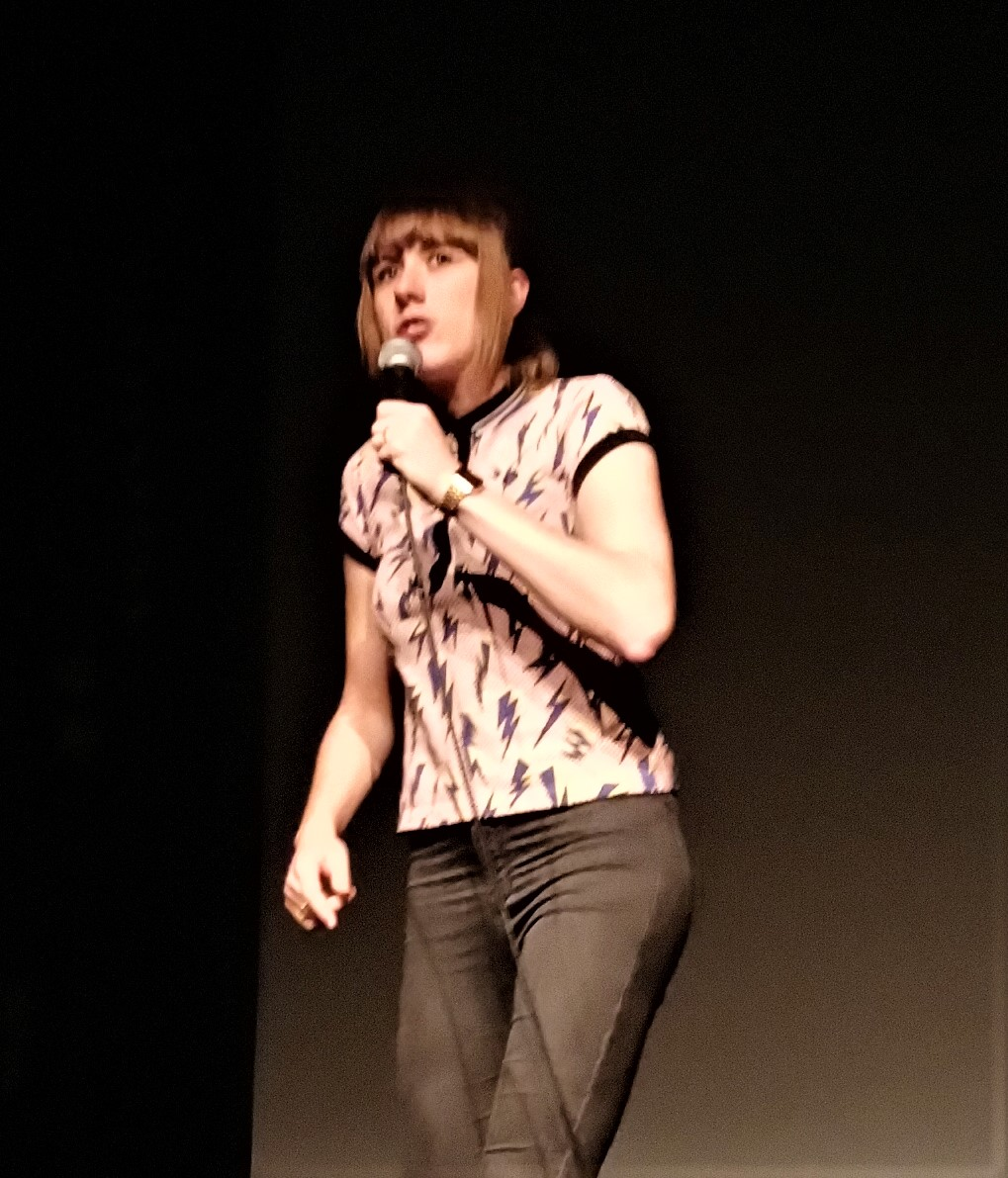
Adam performing in 2022

After graduating, Adam did not have an agent and had difficulty finding acting jobs. She moved back in with her parents in Yorkshire and worked various temp jobs. This led her to try stand-up, with her first gig at the Ilkley Literature Festival fringe on 13 October 2016 with a one-hour show called Living on the Edge. In 2017, Adam won the national contest So You Think You're Funny for new stand-up acts at the Edinburgh Fringe Festival. Winning the contest led to her getting signed with an agent.

Adam's first full-length Edinburgh solo show, Vague, was nominated for the Best Newcomer Award at the 2018 Edinburgh Comedy Awards. In that year, she won the Amused Moose National New Comic Award. Adam returned to the Edinburgh Fringe in 2019 with her show Hang Fire, which she took on a UK and European tour in 2019/2020.

In March 2024, Adam announced her biggest tour so far, entitled Appraisal.

=== Television ===
Adam first appeared as a contestant on The Chase while she was a university student in April 2016. There, she was eliminated by Paul Sinha in her head-to-head round with him.

Following her television appearance as a comedian on ITV2's The Stand-Up Sketch Show in February 2019, Adam has appeared on episodes of 8 Out of 10 Cats, Mock the Week, QI, Have I Got News for You, Would I Lie To You?, Richard Osman's House of Games, Roast Battle and The Last Leg. She portrayed punk singer Siouxsie Sioux in a 2018 episode of Urban Myths, titled "The Sex Pistols Vs. Bill Grundy".

She has written for Never Mind the Buzzcocks, and in 2019 she was a writer on two episodes of Rob Beckett's Savage Socials on Channel 4.

She narrated the reality show The Cabins, which first aired on 4 January 2021 on ITV2. A second series was renewed and aired on 3 January 2022.

In November 2022, Adam appeared in the new series of Outsiders on Dave. In December 2022, she was on The Big Fat Quiz of the Year as a panellist with Katherine Ryan. She appeared again on The Big Fat Quiz of the Year in 2024, paired with Chris McCausland.

In June 2023, Adam appeared as a contestant on Tipping Point for Soccer Aid with Brian McFadden and Sam Matterface, which Brian McFadden won.

In February 2024, Adam appeared as a contestant in Celebrity Mastermind alongside Michelle Heaton, Nihal Arthanayake and Aaron Evans.

In July 2025, Adam was announced to be a contestant in the 20th series of Taskmaster along with Ania Magliano, Phil Ellis, Reece Shearsmith and Sanjeev Bhaskar. She tied for first place with Magliano and Ellis; Adam then won the tiebreaker challenge, making her the winner.

In August 2025, Adam was announced as one of the contestants on the second series of LOL: Last One Laughing UK, which aired in early 2026.

=== Podcasts ===
Since December 2019, Adam has hosted a podcast, That's a First!, with fellow comedian Tom Lucy.

In 2023, Adam became the co-host of Big Kick Energy, with fellow comedian Suzi Ruffell. Launched for the 2023 FIFA Women's World Cup, Big Kick Energy now primarily focuses on the Women's Super League Season (WSL). It has been nominated for a Sports Broadcast Award.

Adam co-hosts Remember Me? with Maisie Adam & Scott Bryan, a Mike Drop Studios podcast with TV critic Scott Bryan about tabloid and early internet fame. Guests of the show have included Nadia Almada (Big Brother), Honey G (X Factor), Kelli Young (Liberty X), James 'Hunter' Crossley (Gladiators) and comedian Dom Joly.

== Awards and nominations ==
Adam has been nominated for or won several awards, including:

- 2018: Winner – Amused Moose National New Comic winner
- 2017: Winner – So You Think You're Funny
- 2018: Nominee – Edinburgh Comedy Awards, Best Newcomer
- 2019: Nominee – Chortle Awards, Best Newcomer

== Personal life ==
As of 2021, Adam lives in Brighton. She plays for a football team in Brighton and is also a Leeds United fan. She also participated in Soccer Aid 2023, Soccer Aid 2024 and Soccer Aid 2025. While in lockdown during the COVID-19 pandemic, she cut her hair to a Chelsea style, which became her signature look at the time.

In December 2021, she became engaged to Mike Dobinson. They married on 10 June 2023.
