= List of 8 Out of 10 Cats Does Countdown episodes =

8 Out of 10 Cats Does Countdown is a British comedy panel show hosted by Jimmy Carr. It is a crossover of 8 Out of 10 Cats and game show Countdown. The show follows the format of Countdown, but with hosts and contestants from 8 Out of 10 Cats, and an emphasis on the humour seen on 8 Out of 10 Cats. All episodes (Note: Apart from the very first episode from 2 January 2012 and Election Special from 2017.) are approximately 45 minutes long, and usually featured team captains Sean Lock and Jon Richardson; after Lock's death in 2021 his team has been led by a rotating series of guest captains, until 2025 when he was replaced by Rob Beckett, while Richardson continues to be a regular captain.

As of 30 January 2026, 180 episodes of 8 Out of 10 Cats Does Countdown have aired.

== Series overview ==
Series	Episodes	Originally released		Ave. UK viewers (millions) (Note: The series averages exclude 'Best Bits' compilation specials.)
Series	Episodes	First released	Last released	Ave. UK viewers (millions)
Original	2	2 January 2012	24 August 2012	2.48
1	2	12 April 2013	19 April 2013	2.44
2	5 (+1)	26 July 2013	20 September 2013	2.42
3	6	3 January 2014	28 February 2014	2.71
4	7	6 June 2014	18 July 2014	2.03
5	3	5 September 2014	19 September 2014	2.39
6	6 (+1)	29 December 2014	13 February 2015	2.43
7	17	8 May 2015	4 September 2015	1.95
8	4 (+1)	8 December 2015	5 February 2016	2.04
9	5	25 February 2016	31 March 2016	1.90
10	5	5 August 2016	2 September 2016	1.73
11	7	24 September 2016	5 November 2016	1.51
12	8 (+2)	24 December 2016	1 May 2017	1.68
13	3 (+1)	8 June 2017	6 July 2017	1.17
14	5	18 August 2017	22 September 2017	1.54
15	4 (+1)	29 December 2017	9 February 2018	2.06
16	8	13 July 2018	31 August 2018	1.51
17	6 (+1)	23 December 2018	15 February 2019	1.76
18	7	26 July 2019	6 September 2019	1.67
19	6 (+1)	23 December 2019	14 February 2020	1.36
20	3 (+2 ‘BB’)	31 July 2020	14 August 2020	1.37
21	6 (+1)	21 December 2020	18 February 2021	ca. 1.73
22	6 (+1)	24 December 2021	11 February 2022	1.55
23	6	29 July 2022	2 September 2022	ca. 1.05
24	2 (+1 +2 ‘BB’)	23 December 2022	11 August 2023	N/A
25	5 (+1)	21 December 2023	9 February 2024	ca. 1.02
26	5	19 July 2024	16 August 2024	0.75
27	5 (+1 ‘BB’)	3 January 2025	31 January 2025	0.96
28	5 (+3 ‘BB’)	25 July 2025	25 September 2025	0.94
29	3 (+1)	24 December 2025	30 January 2026	0.96
30	2	31 July 2026	7 August 2026	0.70

== Episodes ==
=== Legend ===
– indicates a regular episode.
– indicates a Christmas themed episode.
– indicates a highlights edition.
Other colours indicate other themed episodes.
TC – a guest team captain sitting in for Sean or Jon

=== Original episodes (2012) ===
No. overall	No. in series	Original air date	Sean's Team	Jon's Team	Dictionary Corner Guest	Scores	UK viewers (millions)
1	1	2 January 2012	–	–	Joe Wilkinson	21–45	2.90 (Note: 2.49 million on Channel 4, 411,000 on Channel 4 +1)
2	2 (Note: "The Rematch")	24 August 2012	Clarke Carlisle	Joe Wilkinson	David O'Doherty	50–41	2.06 (Note: 1.68 million on Channel 4, 379,000 on Channel 4 +1)

=== Series 1 (2013) ===
No. overall	No. in series	Original air date	Lee Mack's Team (Note: Guest captain in place of Sean Lock)	Jon's Team	Dictionary Corner Guest	Scores	UK viewers (millions)
3	1	12 April 2013	Rob Beckett	Rhod Gilbert	Tim Key	31–47	2.63 (Note: 2.07 million on Channel 4, 559,000 on Channel 4 +1)
4	2	19 April 2013	Richard Osman	Stephen Mangan	Henning Wehn	47–54	2.24 (Note: 1.74 million on Channel 4, 495,000 on Channel 4 +1)

=== Series 2 (2013) ===
No. overall	No. in series	Original air date	Sean's Team	Jon's Team	Dictionary Corner Guest	Scores	UK viewers (millions)
5	1	26 July 2013	Jason Manford	Rhod Gilbert	Danny Dyer	23–36	2.47 (Note: 2.08 million on Channel 4, 386,000 on Channel 4 +1)
6	2	2 August 2013	Rhod Gilbert	Miles Jupp	Nick Helm	49–47	2.30 (Note: 1.83 million on Channel 4, 467,000 on Channel 4 +1)
7	3	9 August 2013	Humphrey Ker	Sarah Millican	Rich Hall	30–52	2.46 (Note: 2.17 million on Channel 4, 291,000 on Channel 4 +1)
8	4	16 August 2013	Sarah Millican	Chris Ramsey	Abandoman	40–62	2.10 (Note: 1.68 million on Channel 4, 424,000 on Channel 4 +1)
9	5	13 September 2013	TC: Lee Mack; Bob Mortimer	Adam Hills	Alex Horne and The Horne Section	0–153 (Note: Having reached the Countdown Conundrum without scoring, Mack and Mortimer (with help from Joe Wilkinson) persuaded Jimmy Carr to award 100 points for the Conundrum (which they proceeded to lose anyway, with the bonus still being awarded to Hills and Richardson).)	2.30 (Note: 1.90 million on Channel 4, 404,000 on Channel 4 +1)
10	– (Note: 1980s-themed special)	20 September 2013	TC: Lee Mack; David O'Doherty	Henning Wehn	Vic Reeves	22–46	2.88 (Note: 2.55 million on Channel 4, 334,000 on Channel 4 +1)

=== Series 3 (2014) ===
No. overall	No. in series	Original air date	Sean's Team	Jon's Team	Dictionary Corner Guest	Scores	UK viewers (millions)
11	1	3 January 2014	Rhod Gilbert	Kevin Bridges	Josie Long	27–39	2.37 (Note: 1.97 million on Channel 4, 371,000 on Channel 4 +1)
12	2	10 January 2014	Miles Jupp	Aisling Bea	Nick Helm	26–51	2.75 (Note: 2.31 million on Channel 4, 436,000 on Channel 4 +1)
13	3	17 January 2014	Kathy Burke	Josh Widdicombe	Dara Ó Briain	42–37	2.70 (Note: 2.29 million on Channel 4, 406,000 on Channel 4 +1)
14	4	24 January 2014	Dara Ó Briain	Sharon Horgan	Adam Buxton	28–29	2.79 (Note: 2.51 million on Channel 4, 283,000 on Channel 4 +1)
15	5	21 February 2014	Jack Dee	James Corden	Joe Lycett	35–31	2.76 (Note: 2.49 million on Channel 4, 269,000 on Channel 4 +1)
16	6	28 February 2014	James Corden	Kevin Bridges	Peter Serafinowicz	39–45	2.90 (Note: 2.53 million on Channel 4, 366,000 on Channel 4 +1)

=== Series 4 (2014) ===
No. overall	No. in series	Original air date	Sean's Team	Jon's Team	Dictionary Corner Guest	Scores	UK viewers (millions)
17	1	6 June 2014	Roisin Conaty	Jonathan Ross	David O'Doherty	21–54	2.30 (Note: 1.95 million on Channel 4, 349,000 on Channel 4 +1)
18	2	13 June 2014	Freddie Flintoff	Rhod Gilbert	Henning Wehn	16–43	1.76 (Note: 1.42 million on Channel 4, 342,000 on Channel 4 +1)
19	3	20 June 2014	Josie Long	Rob Beckett	Vic Reeves	41–25	1.93 (Note: 1.66 million on Channel 4, 274,000 on Channel 4 +1)
20	4	27 June 2014	Stephen Mangan	Jason Manford	Tim Key	36–40	1.88 (Note: 1.59 million on Channel 4, 287,000 on Channel 4 +1)
21	5	4 July 2014	Jo Brand	Claudia Winkleman	Bill Bailey	39–35	1.98 (Note: 1.73 million on Channel 4, 252,000 on Channel 4 +1)
22	6	11 July 2014	Bill Bailey	Josh Widdicombe	Jake Yapp (Note: Lauren Goodger appeared in this episode in a sketch with Joe Wilkinson; they pretended to film a scene for The Only Way Is Essex.)	21–30	2.35 (Note: 1.98 million on Channel 4, 371,000 on Channel 4 +1)
23	7	18 July 2014	Bob Mortimer	Richard Osman	Matthew Crosby	17–57	2.00 (Note: 1.72 million on Channel 4, 281,000 on Channel 4 +1)

=== Series 5 (2014) ===
No. overall	No. in series	Original air date	Sean's Team	Jon's Team	Dictionary Corner Guest	Scores	UK viewers (millions)
24	1	5 September 2014	Roisin Conaty	David Mitchell	Phill Jupitus (Note: Dennis Taylor appeared in this episode with Joe Wilkinson.)	27–34	2.30 (Note: 1.91 million on Channel 4, 391,000 on Channel 4 +1)
25	2	12 September 2014	Trevor Noah	David Baddiel	Joey Essex (Note: Joe Wilkinson was absent from this episode. Alex Horne and The Horne Section instead assisted Rachel Riley.)	37–31	2.45 (Note: 2.00 million on Channel 4, 452,000 on Channel 4 +1)
26	3	19 September 2014	Jo Brand; Jon O'Neill (Note: Introduced as "octochamp of regular Countdown.")	Vic Reeves; Rob Beckett	Adam Buxton (Note: Joe Wilkinson was absent from this episode.)	52–24	2.43 (Note: 2.00 million on Channel 4, 434,000 on Channel 4 +1)

=== Series 6 (2014–15) ===
No. overall	No. in series	Original air date	Sean's Team	Jon's Team	Dictionary Corner Guest	Scores	UK viewers (millions)
27	– (Note: Christmas Special 2014)	29 December 2014	Kathy Burke	David Baddiel	Alex Horne and The Horne Section	28–38	2.65 (Note: 2.29 million on Channel 4, 356,000 on Channel 4 +1)
28	1	9 January 2015	David Mitchell	Katherine Ryan	David O'Doherty	22–31	2.76 (Note: 2.43 million on Channel 4, 326,000 on Channel 4 +1)
29	2	16 January 2015	Roisin Conaty	Jack Whitehall	Rob Beckett	28–890 (Note: The conundrum was worth 843 points, for Jon to break Conor Travers' record for highest cumulative score on Countdown.)	2.43 (Note: 2.16 million on Channel 4, 271,000 on Channel 4 +1)
30	3	23 January 2015	Reginald D. Hunter	Aisling Bea	Holly Walsh	34–62	2.29 (Note: 1.88 million on Channel 4, 410,000 on Channel 4 +1)
31	4	30 January 2015	Romesh Ranganathan	Johnny Vegas	Josie Long	33–41	2.53 (Note: 2.26 million on Channel 4, 274,000 on Channel 4 +1)
32	5	6 February 2015	Vic Reeves	Bob Mortimer	Jack Whitehall	28–30	1.77 (Note: 1.44 million on Channel 4, 332,000 on Channel 4 +1)
33	6	13 February 2015	Jason Manford; Jen Steadman (Note: Introduced as "the greatest ever female player in Countdown history".)	TC: Sarah Millican; Jonathan Ross; Roisin Conaty	Bill Bailey	54–28	2.58 (Note: 2.22 million on Channel 4, 359,000 on Channel 4 +1)

=== Series 7 (2015) ===
No. overall	No. in series	Original air date	Sean's Team	Jon's Team	Dictionary Corner Guest	Scores	UK viewers (millions)
34	1	8 May 2015	Bill Bailey; Paul Foot	TC: Sarah Millican; Rob Delaney; Romesh Ranganathan	Nina Conti	54–13	1.65 (Note: 1.32 million on Channel 4, 325,000 on Channel 4 +1)
35	2	15 May 2015	Kevin Bridges	Kathy Burke	Joe Lycett (Note: Nick Helm assisted Rachel Riley in place of Joe Wilkinson.)	35–39	2.09 (Note: 1.83 million on Channel 4, 360,000 on Channel 4 +1)
36	3	22 May 2015	Rhod Gilbert	Sara Pascoe	Johnny Vegas (Note: Joey Essex assisted Rachel Riley in place of Joe Wilkinson.)	23–34	1.83 (Note: 1.47 million on Channel 4, 355,000 on Channel 4 +1)
37	4	29 May 2015	Rob Beckett	Katherine Ryan	Greg Davies	34–52	1.71 (Note: 1.28 million on Channel 4, 425,000 on Channel 4 +1)
38	5	5 June 2015	Miles Jupp	Greg Davies	Holly Walsh	23–47	1.90 (Note: 1.65 million on Channel 4, 251,000 on Channel 4 +1)
39	6	19 June 2015	Vic Reeves	TC: Lee Mack; Sara Pascoe	Alex Horne and The Horne Section	26–28	1.70 (Note: 1.48 million on Channel 4, 220,000 on Channel 4 +1)
40	7	26 June 2015	Bob Mortimer	TC: Sarah Millican; Katherine Ryan	Alex Horne and The Horne Section	50–41	1.72 (Note: 1.51 million on Channel 4, 208,000 on Channel 4 +1)
41	8	3 July 2015	Roisin Conaty; Rachel Riley	TC: Sarah Millican; Rhod Gilbert; Susie Dent	David O'Doherty	44–22	1.56 (Note: No +1 figure available)
42	9	10 July 2015	Seann Walsh; Antoinette Ryan (Note: Countdown octochamp. Helped out Sean Lock's team for the last round.)	TC: Joe Wilkinson; Danny Dyer	Bill Bailey (Note: Kym Marsh appeared as a barmaid in charge of a special pub quiz round.)	47–29	1.79 (Note: 1.48 million on Channel 4, 306,000 on Channel 4 +1)
43	10	17 July 2015	Johnny Vegas	TC: Sarah Millican; Rob Beckett	Vic Reeves	37–39	1.88 (Note: 1.55 million on Channel 4, 326,000 on Channel 4 +1)
44	11	24 July 2015	Mel Giedroyc	TC: Lee Mack; David O'Doherty	Adam Buxton	34–35	1.91 (Note: 1.66 million on Channel 4, 248,000 on Channel 4 +1)
45	12	31 July 2015	Freddie Flintoff	TC: Bill Bailey; Roisin Conaty	Rob Beckett	48–44	2.03
46	13	7 August 2015	Liza Tarbuck	TC: Sarah Millican; Romesh Ranganathan	Phill Jupitus	42–18	2.09 (Note: 1.76 million on Channel 4, 329,000 on Channel 4 +1)
47	14	14 August 2015	Bill Bailey	TC: Joe Wilkinson; Isy Suttie	Joe Lycett	43–44	2.35 (Note: 2.08 million on Channel 4, 269,000 on Channel 4 +1)
48	15	21 August 2015	Henning Wehn	TC: Bill Bailey; Jessica Hynes	Tom Allen	34–17	2.25 (Note: 2.01 million on Channel 4, 237,000 on Channel 4 +1)
49	16	28 August 2015	Sara Pascoe	Josh Widdicombe; Alex Brooker (Note: Appeared as Josh Widdicombe's Mascot.)	Alex Horne and The Horne Section	50–57	2.25 (Note: 1.95 million on Channel 4, 300,000 on Channel 4 +1)
50	17	4 September 2015	Greg Davies	Holly Walsh	Vic Reeves (Note: Chris Eubank appeared in a section in which his voice was compared with an impersonation by Greg Davies.)	27–25	2.38 (Note: 2.06 million on Channel 4, 322,000 on Channel 4 +1)

=== Series 8 (2015–16) ===
No. overall	No. in series	Original air date	Sean's Team	Jon's Team	Dictionary Corner Guest	Scores	UK viewers (millions)
51	– (Note: Christmas Special 2015)	8 December 2015	Johnny Vegas	Katherine Ryan	David O'Doherty	34–33 (Note: Jimmy Carr stated that because it was the Christmas Special, the Countdown Conundrum was worth 13 points instead of 10, thus giving Sean and Johnny a shot at victory. During the round, Vegas was handed a suspicious piece of paper by Dictionary Corner, announced the answer shortly after, and secured the victory.)	1.82 (Note: 1.55 million on Channel 4, 271,000 on Channel 4 +1)
52	1	15 January 2016	Jason Manford	Roisin Conaty	Sam Simmons	31–33	1.98
53	2	22 January 2016	Rob Beckett	Cariad Lloyd (Note: Cariad Lloyd's mascot references David Bowie. The episode aired shortly after his death. Channel 4 noted that this episode was filmed before the death of David Bowie.)	Jamie Laing	32–22	2.39 (Note: 2.13 million on Channel 4, 263,000 on Channel 4 +1)
54	3	29 January 2016	Miles Jupp	Sara Pascoe	Sam Simmons	33–28	1.91 (Note: 1.62 million on Channel 4, 288,000 on Channel 4 +1)
55	4	5 February 2016	Isy Suttie	Richard Osman	Alex Horne and The Horne Section	44–57	2.11

=== Series 9 (2016) ===
No. overall	No. in series	Original air date	Sean's Team	Jon's Team	Dictionary Corner Guest	Scores	UK viewers (millions)
56	1	25 February 2016	Vic Reeves	Aisling Bea	David O'Doherty	29–37	1.97 (Note: 1.64 million on Channel 4, 321,000 on Channel 4 +1)
57	2	3 March 2016	Bob Mortimer	Holly Walsh	Isy Suttie (Note: Claudia Winkleman stood in for Rachel Riley in this episode.)	33–23	2.06 (Note: 1.81 million on Channel 4, 246,000 on Channel 4 +1)
58	3	10 March 2016	TC: Johnny Vegas; Sara Pascoe	Alex Brooker	Tom Allen (Note: Claudia Winkleman and Rob Beckett stood in for Rachel Riley in this episode.) (Note: Kriss Akabusi and Sally Gunnell also appeared in this episode.)	25–25	2.00 (Note: 1.68 million on Channel 4, 318,000 on Channel 4 +1)
59	4	24 March 2016	Kevin Bridges	Rebecca Front	Joe Lycett	7–40	2.06 (Note: 1.76 million on Channel 4, 298,000 on Channel 4 +1)
60	5	31 March 2016	Katherine Ryan	David Mitchell	Nick Helm (Note: Dennis Taylor also appeared in this episode.)	38–32	1.43

=== Series 10 (2016) ===
No. overall	No. in series	Original air date	Sean's Team	Jon's Team	Dictionary Corner Guest	Scores	UK viewers (millions)
61	1	5 August 2016	Henning Wehn	Victoria Coren Mitchell	Tom Allen (Note: Pat Sharp and Joe Wilkinson also appeared in this episode.)	25–68	1.93 (Note: 1.67 million on Channel 4, 260,000 on Channel 4 +1)
62	2	12 August 2016	Roisin Conaty	Nish Kumar	Adam Buxton (Note: Mr Motivator and Martin Offiah also appeared in this episode.)	22–32	1.57 (Note: 1.36 million on Channel 4, 210,000 on Channel 4 +1)
63	3	19 August 2016	David O'Doherty	Natasia Demetriou	John Kearns	42–20	1.30 (Note: 1.15 million on Channel 4, 150,000 on Channel 4 +1)
64	4	26 August 2016	David Mitchell	Katherine Ryan	Brett Domino Trio	27–26	1.83 (Note: 1.59 million on Channel 4, 240,000 on Channel 4 +1)
65	5	2 September 2016	TC: Claudia Winkleman; Johnny Vegas	Reginald D. Hunter	Sara Pascoe (Note: Joe Wilkinson also appeared in this episode.)	21–28	2.00 (Note: 1.65 million on Channel 4, 350,000 on Channel 4 +1)

=== Series 11 (2016) ===
Lock and Richardson never appeared together in this series.

No. overall	No. in series	Original air date	Sean's Team	Jon's Team	Dictionary Corner Guest	Scores	UK viewers (millions)
66	1	24 September 2016	TC: David Walliams; Jonathan Ross	Joe Lycett	Isy Suttie	29–28 (Note: The Countdown Conundrum was worth 13 points instead of 10 so that David's team could have a shot at winning. David subsequently got the conundrum.)	1.53
67	2	1 October 2016	Miles Jupp	TC: Lee Mack; Catherine Tate	John Cooper Clarke	41–31	1.52
68	3	8 October 2016	TC: David Walliams; Jessica Hynes	Rhod Gilbert	Sam Simmons (Note: Brian Belo also appeared in this episode.)	22–32	1.44
69	4	15 October 2016	Victoria Coren Mitchell	TC: Lee Mack; Bob Mortimer	Alex Horne and The Horne Section	40–24	1.46
70	5	22 October 2016	TC: Richard Ayoade; Rob Beckett	Claudia Winkleman	Adam Riches as "Sean Bean" (Note: Riches was in the character of Sean Bean for this episode.) (Note: Dermot Gallagher also appeared in this episode.)	3–48	1.59
71	6	29 October 2016	Danny Dyer	TC: Joe Wilkinson; Gabby Logan	David O'Doherty	46–11	1.41
72	7	5 November 2016	TC: David Mitchell; Cariad Lloyd	Russell Howard	Sam Simmons	31–53	1.61

=== Series 12 (2016–17) ===
No. overall	No. in series	Original air date	Sean's Team	Jon's Team	Dictionary Corner Guest	Scores	UK viewers (millions)
73	– (Note: Christmas Special 2016)	24 December 2016	Kathy Burke	Russell Howard	Joe Lycett	18–43	2.51
74	– (Note: End of Year Special 2016)	30 December 2016	TC: Johnny Vegas; Sara Pascoe	Richard Osman	David O'Doherty	7–45	1.51
75	1	13 January 2017	Stephen Mangan	TC: Noel Fielding; Fay Ripley	Brett Domino Trio (Note: Mark Murray (Series 70 champion) also appeared in this episode.)	45–22	1.81
76	2	20 January 2017	TC: Russell Howard; Roisin Conaty (Note: Russell's mother Ninette also appeared in this episode.)	Phil Wang	Nick Helm	31–45	1.79
77	3	27 January 2017	TC: Johnny Vegas; Jamie Laing	David O'Doherty	Holly Walsh	18–38	1.79
78	4	3 February 2017	Joe Wilkinson	Jayde Adams	David Baddiel (Note: Pat Sharp also appeared in this episode.)	40–38	1.70
79	5	10 February 2017	TC: Joe Wilkinson; Roisin Conaty	David Mitchell	Tom Allen	7–74	1.90
80	6	17 February 2017	TC: Jonathan Ross; Johnny Vegas	Michelle Wolf	Pappy's	29–42	1.68
81	7	24 April 2017	TC: Lee Mack; Sarah Millican	James Acaster	John Cooper Clarke	36–49	1.00
82	8	1 May 2017	TC: Joe Wilkinson; Katherine Ryan	Chris Addison	David O'Doherty	18–41	1.15

=== Series 13 (2017) ===
No. overall	No. in series	Original air date	Sean's Team	Jon's Team	Dictionary Corner Guest	Scores	UK viewers (millions)
83	– (Note: Election Special 2017)	8 June 2017	TC: Alan Carr; Romesh Ranganathan	Sarah Millican	John Kearns	22–41	1.26
84	1	22 June 2017	Michelle Wolf	Joe Lycett	Adam Riches as "Sean Bean" (Note: Richard Osman also appeared in this episode.)	34–35	0.91
85	2	29 June 2017	TC: Lee Mack; Victoria Coren Mitchell	Jonathan Ross	Jessie Cave	52–47	1.23
86	3	6 July 2017	Stephen Mangan	TC: Richard Ayoade; Katherine Ryan	Bill Bailey	55–5	1.26

=== Series 14 (2017) ===
No. overall	No. in series	Original air date	Sean's Team	Jon's Team	Dictionary Corner Guest	Scores	UK viewers (millions)
87	1	18 August 2017	TC: Alan Carr; Kevin Bridges	Cariad Lloyd	Elis James; John Robins	45–18	1.59
88	2	25 August 2017	TC: Johnny Vegas; Bob Mortimer	TC: Kathy Burke; Roisin Conaty	John Cooper Clarke	12–35	1.49
89	3	1 September 2017	TC: Alan Carr; Katherine Ryan	Jason Manford	Tom Binns as Ivan Brackenbury	29–24	1.48
90	4	15 September 2017	Vic Reeves	Sara Pascoe	David O'Doherty	29–49	1.42
91	5	22 September 2017	TC: Jason Manford; Joe Wilkinson	TC: Lee Mack; Fay Ripley	Alex Horne and The Horne Section	33–30	1.72

=== Series 15 (2017–18) ===
No. overall	No. in series	Original air date	Sean's Team	Jon's Team	Dictionary Corner Guest	Scores	UK viewers (millions)
92	– (Note: Christmas Special 2017)	29 December 2017	Joe Wilkinson	Catherine Tate	Joe Lycett	30–41	1.83
93	1	19 January 2018	TC: Kevin Bridges; Jessica Knappett	Joe Wilkinson	John Cooper Clarke	29–34	1.88
94	2	26 January 2018	TC: Lee Mack; Victoria Coren Mitchell	TC: Alan Carr; Dane Baptiste	Sam Simmons	52–41	2.06
95	3	2 February 2018	TC: Joe Wilkinson; Sara Pascoe	TC: Alan Carr; Josh Widdicombe	Bill Bailey	26–34	2.26
96	4	9 February 2018	TC: Johnny Vegas; Rhod Gilbert	TC: Joe Wilkinson; Roisin Conaty	Tom Allen (Note: Andy Fordham also appeared in this episode.)	31–19	2.25

=== Series 16 (2018) ===
No. overall	No. in series	Original air date	Sean's Team	Jon's Team	Dictionary Corner Guest	Scores	UK viewers (millions)
97	1 (Note: Special, celebrating 100 years of women's suffrage. Presented by Katherine Ryan.)	13 July 2018	TC: Sara Pascoe; Lolly Adefope	TC: Roisin Conaty; Jessica Hynes	Morgana Robinson as "Natalie Cassidy" (Note: Robinson was in the character of Natalie Cassidy for this episode.)	37–17	1.46
98	2	20 July 2018	Katherine Ryan	Joe Wilkinson	John Cooper Clarke	31–45	1.31
99	3	27 July 2018	Miles Jupp	TC: Alan Carr; Roisin Conaty	Tom Binns as Ivan Brackenbury (Note: Binns was in the character of Ivan Brackenbury for this episode.) (Note: The voice of Kevin Eldon also appears in this episode.)	46–19	1.51
100	4	3 August 2018	Rob Beckett	Claudia Winkleman	Nick Mohammed as Mr Swallow (Note: Mohammed was in the character of Mr. Swallow for this episode.)	37–47	1.27
101	5	10 August 2018	Phil Wang	TC: Alan Carr; Harriet Kemsley	David O'Doherty	34–22	1.35
102	6	17 August 2018	Richard Ayoade	Jessica Knappett	Alex Horne and The Horne Section	42–43	1.85
103	7	24 August 2018	Kevin Bridges	TC: Joe Wilkinson; Victoria Coren Mitchell	Adam Kay	36–46	1.59
104	8	31 August 2018	Roisin Conaty	TC: Alan Carr; Joe Lycett	Spencer Jones	52–29	1.76

=== Series 17 (2018–19) ===
No. overall	No. in series	Original air date	Sean's Team	Jon's Team	Dictionary Corner Guest	Scores	UK viewers (millions)
105	– (Note: Christmas Special 2018)	23 December 2018	Kathy Burke	David Mitchell	James Acaster	32–45	2.11
106	1	11 January 2019	Johnny Vegas	TC: Alan Carr; Lou Sanders	Brett Domino Trio	36–24	1.63
107	2	18 January 2019	Claudia Winkleman	Henning Wehn	Nick Helm	35–27	1.86
108	3	25 January 2019	Joe Wilkinson	TC: Richard Ayoade; Aisling Bea	Tom Allen	22–35	1.55
109	4	1 February 2019	David Mitchell	Sara Pascoe	Ellie White; Natasia Demetriou as "Mum's The Word"	37–54	1.63
110	5	8 February 2019	Michelle Wolf	Rob Beckett	Spencer Jones	16–70	1.75
111	6	15 February 2019	Joe Wilkinson	Harriet Kemsley	James Veitch	46–40	1.76

=== Series 18 (2019) ===
No. overall	No. in series	Original air date	Sean's Team	Jon's Team	Dictionary Corner Guest	Scores	UK viewers (millions)
112	1	26 July 2019	Miles Jupp	Rose Matafeo	Vic Reeves (Note: David Reed also appeared in this episode.)	38–55	1.59
113	2	2 August 2019	Victoria Coren Mitchell	James Acaster	Morgana Robinson as "Natalie Cassidy"	21–42	1.60
114	3	9 August 2019	Joe Wilkinson	Sara Pascoe	Sam Simmons	25–50	1.55
115	4	16 August 2019	Rob Beckett	TC: Alan Carr; Sarah Millican	Nick Mohammed as Mr Swallow	21–49	1.71
116	5	23 August 2019	Sara Pascoe	TC: Alan Carr; Tom Allen	Rosie Jones	37–29	1.71
117	6	30 August 2019	Harriet Kemsley	TC: Alan Carr; Catherine Tate	Adam Buxton	41–24	1.51
118	7	6 September 2019	Katherine Ryan	Joe Wilkinson	Adam Riches as "Sean Bean" (Note: Paul Young also appeared in this episode.)	29–33	1.72

=== Series 19 (2020) ===
No. overall	No. in series	Original air date	Sean's Team	Jon's Team	Dictionary Corner Guest	Scores	UK viewers (millions)
119	– (Note: Christmas Special 2019)	23 December 2019	Bob Mortimer	Lucy Beaumont	Adam Buxton (Note: Anthea Turner also appeared in this episode.)	34–46	2.00
120	1	9 January 2020	Harry Hill	Rose Matafeo	Alex Horne and The Horne Section	22–51	1.55
121	2	16 January 2020	Joe Wilkinson	Kiri Pritchard-McLean	Brett Domino Trio	18–27	1.33
122	3	23 January 2020	Richard Ayoade	Katherine Ryan	David O'Doherty	44–44 (Note: Dictionary Corner provided Richard Ayoade with the answer to The Countdown Conundrum to enable Sean's team to tie.)	1.23
123	4	30 January 2020	Miles Jupp	Sophie Duker	Miles Chapman; Mark O'Sullivan as "Lee and Dean" (Note: Chapman and O'Sullivan were in the characters of Lee and Dean (from Lee and Dean) for this episode.)	17–44	1.27
124	5	7 February 2020	Kevin Bridges	Victoria Coren Mitchell	Spencer Jones	21–50	1.38
125	6	14 February 2020	Harriet Kemsley	Chris McCausland	Nick Helm	19–49	1.42

=== Series 20 (2020) ===
This series is composed of unaired episodes as a result of the COVID-19 pandemic. The first two episodes were recorded in late 2019 to accommodate Rachel Riley's maternity leave, made obvious by the fact she still appears 8-months pregnant in these episodes; the third episode was originally filmed in early 2019 as references were made to Richard Ayoade's role in the "recent" film The Lego Movie 2: The Second Part; and the fourth and fifth episodes were Best Bits specials that were originally assembled in 2018. The Christmas Special was also filmed in 2019, prior to Riley's pregnancy.

No. overall	No. in series	Original air date	Sean's Team	Jon's Team	Dictionary Corner Guest	Scores	UK viewers (millions)
126	1	31 July 2020	Kerry Godliman	Joe Wilkinson	Nick Mohammed as Mr Swallow	24–30	1.82
127	2	7 August 2020	Rosie Jones	Tom Allen	Adam Riches as "Sean Bean"	37–50	1.28
128	3	14 August 2020	Daisy May Cooper	TC: Richard Ayoade; Ivo Graham	Adam Buxton	22–27	1.39
BB 1	1 (Note: Best Bits Special)	21 August 2020 (Note: First broadcast on BBC UKTV in Australia on 26 November 2019)	Various	Various	Various	N/A	1.30
BB 2	2	28 August 2020 (Note: First broadcast on BBC UKTV in Australia on 3 December 2019)	Various	Various	Various	N/A	1.10

=== Series 21 (2021) ===
The last series broadcast prior to Sean Lock's death in 2021. The first three episodes were shot in 2019.

No. overall	No. in series	Original air date	Sean's Team	Jon's Team	Dictionary Corner Guest	Scores	UK viewers (millions)
129	– (Note: Christmas Special 2020)	21 December 2020 (Note: First broadcast on BBC UKTV in Australia on 24 April 2020)	David Mitchell	Sarah Millican	David O'Doherty	46–21	1.75
130	1	14 January 2021	Johnny Vegas	TC: Katherine Ryan; Joe Lycett	Rob Carter as "Christopher Bliss" (Note: Carter was in the character of Christopher Bliss for this episode.)	33–42	1.40 (Note: (7-day consolidated, excluding non-TV viewership))
131	2	21 January 2021	Paul Foot	Angela Barnes	John Cooper Clarke	55–40	N/A
132	3	28 January 2021	Harriet Kemsley	Joe Lycett	Mat Ewins	28–39	N/A
133	4	4 February 2021	Richard Ayoade	Sara Pascoe	Nick Helm	42–52	1.58
134	5	11 February 2021	TC: Roisin Conaty; Joe Wilkinson	Lucy Beaumont	Bec Hill	35–42	1.94
135	6	18 February 2021	TC: Lee Mack; Katherine Ryan	Joe Wilkinson	Brett Domino Trio	41–31	2.00

=== Series 22 (2022) ===
No. overall	No. in series	Original air date	Sean's Team	Jon's Team	Dictionary Corner Guest	Scores	UK viewers (millions)
136	– (Note: Christmas Special 2021)	24 December 2021 (Note: The show was the first episode broadcast after Sean Lock's death, but was recorded before his death.) (Note: A tribute "IN LOVING MEMORY OF COMEDY LEGEND SEAN LOCK 1963–2021" was shown at the end of this episode.)	TC: Lee Mack; Jason Manford	Sarah Millican	Nick Mohammed as Mr Swallow	59–22	1.70
137	1	7 January 2022	TC: Roisin Conaty; Kiri Pritchard-McLean	Rob Beckett	Huge Davies	6–33	1.47
138	2	14 January 2022	TC: Jack Dee; Tom Allen	Judi Love	John Cooper Clarke	27–42	1.50
139	3	21 January 2022	TC: Roisin Conaty; Asim Chaudhry	Josh Widdicombe	Bill Bailey	15–58	1.77
140	4	28 January 2022	TC: Lee Mack; Joe Wilkinson	Jessica Knappett	Nigel Ng	39–46	1.78
141	5	4 February 2022	TC: Sarah Millican; Nish Kumar	Maisie Adam	David O'Doherty	25–41	1.16
142	6	11 February 2022 (Note: Last appearance of Sean Lock; he died in August 2021.)	Harry Hill	Rosie Jones	Nick Mohammed as Mr Swallow	23–32	1.47

=== Series 23 (2022) ===
No. overall	No. in series	Original air date	Guest's Team	Jon's Team	Dictionary Corner Guest	Scores	UK viewers (millions) (Note: From this series, 7-day consolidated without non-TV viewership included.)
143	1	29 July 2022	TC: Richard Ayoade; Joe Wilkinson	Lucy Beaumont	Finlay Christie	28–28	0.96
144	2	5 August 2022	TC: Alan Carr; Harriet Kemsley	TC: Jonathan Ross; Maisie Adam	Huge Davies	37–24	0.99
145	3	12 August 2022	TC: Joe Wilkinson; Jamali Maddix; Bradley Horrocks	Jo Brand	Rachel Parris	73–56	1.15
146	4	19 August 2022	TC: Richard Ayoade; Sara Pascoe	Chris McCausland	Morgana Robinson as Annabel	11–35	1.12
147	5	26 August 2022	TC: Roisin Conaty; Joe Wilkinson	Nabil Abdulrashid	David O'Doherty	14–43	N/A
148	6	2 September 2022	TC: Jonathan Ross; Russell Kane	TC: Alan Carr; Judi Love	Josh Jones	48–28	1.02

=== Series 24 (2023) ===
No. overall	No. in series	Original air date	Guest's Team	Jon's Team	Dictionary Corner Guest	Scores	UK viewers (millions)
149	– (Note: Christmas Special 2022)	23 December 2022	TC: Lee Mack; Rose Matafeo	Jack Dee	Stevie Martin	34–36	N/A
150	1 (Note: Anne-Marie Imafidon stood in for Rachel Riley in this episode.)	6 January 2023	TC: Jonathan Ross; Joe Wilkinson	TC: Roisin Conaty; Ahir Shah	Catherine Cohen	51–41	N/A
151	2	11 August 2023	TC: Sarah Millican; Phil Wang	TC: Tom Allen; Roisin Conaty	Sam Campbell	43–10	1.02
BB 3	1	18 August 2023	Various	Various	Various	N/A	N/A
BB 4	2	25 August 2023	Various	Various	Various	N/A	N/A

=== Series 25 (2024) ===
No. overall	No. in series	Original air date	Guest's Team	Jon's Team	Dictionary Corner Guest	Scores	UK viewers (millions)
152	– (Note: Christmas Special 2023)	21 December 2023	TC: Danny Dyer; Joe Lycett	Roisin Conaty	Nick Mohammed as Mr Swallow	22–63	1.16
153	1	12 January 2024	TC: Lee Mack; Munya Chawawa	Harriet Kemsley	David O'Doherty	35–43	1.03
154	2	19 January 2024	TC: Rob Beckett; Joe Wilkinson	TC: Sarah Millican; Jamali Maddix	Glenn Moore (Note: Mr Motivator also appeared in this episode.)	32–19	N/A
155	3	26 January 2024	TC: Rob Brydon; Katherine Parkinson	Babatunde Aléshé	Adam Buxton	22–33	0.75
156	4	2 February 2024	TC: Joe Lycett; Judi Love	TC: Sarah Millican; Rhod Gilbert	Archie Henderson as Jazz Emu	37–27	1.01
157	5	9 February 2024	TC: Roisin Conaty; Joe Wilkinson	Asim Chaudhry	Lucy Pearman	23–72	1.17

=== Series 26 (2024) ===
No. overall	No. in series	Original air date	Guest's Team	Jon's Team	Dictionary Corner Guest	Scores	UK viewers (millions)
158	1	19 July 2024	TC: Richard Ayoade; Katherine Ryan	Dan Tiernan	John Kearns	39-28	0.92
159	2	26 July 2024 (Note: First broadcast on BBC UKTV in Australia and New Zealand on 21 February 2024.)	TC: Joe Wilkinson; Rosie Jones	TC: Sarah Millican; Tom Allen	Nick Mohammed as Mr Swallow (Note: Nick Mohammed is joined by his son, Finn, as part of one of the Mr. Swallow Dictionary Corner segments.)	43–36	0.65
160	3	2 August 2024	TC: Alan Carr; Munya Chawawa	TC: Sarah Millican; Gary Delaney	Ciarán Dowd as Don Rodolfo	34-26	0.68
161	4	9 August 2024 (Note: First broadcast on BBC UKTV in Australia and New Zealand on 24 January 2024.) (Note: Originally set to broadcast in the UK on Channel 4 on 6 January 2023, as part of series 24.)	TC: Richard Ayoade; Laura Smyth	Katherine Ryan	Mat Ewins	45–46	0.70
162	5	16 August 2024 (Note: First broadcast on BBC UKTV in Australia and New Zealand on 14 February 2024.)	TC: Jonathan Ross; Maisie Adam	TC: Richard Ayoade; Kemah Bob	Sarah Keyworth	41–34	0.81

=== Series 27 (2025) ===
No. overall	No. in series	Original air date	Guest's Team	Jon's Team	Dictionary Corner Guest	Scores	UK viewers (millions)
163	1	3 January 2025	TC: Sarah Millican; Thanyia Moore	TC: Alan Carr; Josh Widdicombe	The Delightful Sausage	40–33	1.09
164	2	10 January 2025	TC: Joe Wilkinson; Phil Wang	Rosie Jones	John Cooper Clarke	48–47	0.88
165	3	17 January 2025 (Note: First broadcast on BBC UKTV in Australia and New Zealand on 31 January 2024. This episode was also originally listed by the British Comedy Guide as airing third in the 25th series.)	TC: Katherine Ryan; Joe Wilkinson	Guz Khan (Note: Khan is also joined by his friend Lumboo as a mascot.)	Alasdair Beckett-King	46–51	1.02
166	4	24 January 2025	TC: Danny Dyer; Helen Bauer	Big Zuu	Mat Ewins	50–49	0.84
167	5	31 January 2025	TC: Richard Ayoade; Guz Khan (Note: Khan is also joined by his friend Haroon as a mascot.)	Amy Gledhill	Sam Campbell	23–49	0.98
BB 5	1 (Note: Best Bits Special; highlights of episodes produced under the fifteenth production run (those broadcast as episodes 143, 144, 147-151, 153, 159, 161, 162 and 165.))	7 February 2025 (Note: First broadcast on BBC UKTV in Australia and New Zealand on 20 March 2024.)	Various	Various	Various	N/A	0.65

=== Series 28 (2025) ===
The first four episodes were filmed in March 2025. The fifth episode was filmed in 2023 and was shown first internationally, shortly before its UK broadcast; details of the episode, including scoring, were leaked online in January 2025. The first and second 'Best Bits' specials were compilations of highlights from episodes filmed in 2023, with the third comprising highlights of episodes filmed in 2022.

No. overall	No. in series	Original air date	Guest's Team	Jon's Team	Dictionary Corner Guest	Scores	UK viewers (millions)
168	1	25 July 2025	TC: Richard Ayoade; Harriet Dyer	TC: Bob Mortimer; Tom Allen	Ian Smith	77–10	1.01
169	2	1 August 2025	TC: Joe Wilkinson; Josh Widdicombe	TC: Rhod Gilbert; Thanyia Moore	Joe Kent-Walters as Frankie Monroe	33–52	1.16
170	3	8 August 2025	TC: Joe Wilkinson; Alex Brooker	TC: Kevin Bridges; Judi Love	Peter Serafinowicz as Brian Butterfield (Note: Jedward also appeared in this episode.)	21–33	0.94
171	4	15 August 2025	TC: Roisin Conaty; Phil Wang	TC: Joe Wilkinson; Lou Sanders	David O'Doherty	39–40	0.65
172	5	22 August 2025 (Note: First broadcast on BBC UKTV in New Zealand on 15 August 2025.)	TC: Rob Brydon; Joe Wilkinson	Lucy Beaumont	Huge Davies	40–34	0.95
BB 6	1 (Note: Best Bits Special; highlights of episodes produced under the sixteenth production run (those broadcast in the UK as episodes 152, 154-158, 160, 163, 164, 166, 167 and 172).)	11 September 2025 (Note: First broadcast on BBC UKTV in New Zealand on 5 September 2025.)	Various	Various	Various	N/A	0.51
BB 7	2	18 September 2025 (Note: First broadcast on BBC UKTV in New Zealand on 12 September 2025.)	Various	Various	Various	N/A	0.42
BB 8	3	25 September 2025 (Note: First broadcast on BBC UKTV in Australia and New Zealand on 27 March 2024.)	Various	Various	Various	N/A	0.50

=== Series 29 (2025–26) ===
From this series, Rob Beckett became a permanent team captain, with Judi Love making semi-regular appearances as a panellist. This series also saw a change to the format in an additional panellist being given to the team losing late in the game.

No. overall	No. in series	Original air date	Rob's Team	Jon's Team	Dictionary Corner Guest	Scores	UK viewers (millions)
173	– (Note: Christmas Special 2025)	24 December 2025	Judi Love	Daisy May Cooper	Katie Norris	44–43	1.26
174	1	16 January 2026	Katherine Parkinson; John Tothill (Note: Joined to 'help the losing team' for the final two rounds and conundrum.)	Judi Love	Spencer Jones	17–74	0.96
175	2	23 January 2026	Kiell Smith-Bynoe; Sam Nicoresti	Roisin Conaty	Lou Wall	47–50	0.76
176	3	30 January 2026	Miles Jupp	Judi Love; Dane Buckley	Róisín and Chiara (Note: Pasha Kovalev also appeared in this episode.)	30–30	0.87

=== Series 30 (2026) ===
No. overall	No. in series	Original air date	Rob's Team	Jon's Team	Dictionary Corner Guest	Scores	UK viewers (millions)
177	1	31 July 2026	Richard Ayoade	Harriet Kemsley	Nick Mohammed as “Mr Swallow”	43–36	0.70
178	2	7 August 2026	Katherine Ryan	Fatiha El-Ghorri; Jake Lambert	Brett Domino Trio	24–36	0.70

=== Forthcoming and unaired episodes ===
Ten episodes are yet to be broadcast; two from a set filmed between September and December 2025 (of which Morgana Robinson and Vittorio Angelone are known guests), six recorded in July 2026, and two shot in October 2026. Another four are due to be filmed in November 2026.

Separately, an episode purported to have been filmed as part of the thirteenth production run in late 2019 - comprising a lineup of Sean Lock and Joe Wilkinson, Jon Richardson and Katherine Ryan, and Tom Binns as Ivan Brackenbury in Dictionary Corner - has never been shown. It is unknown if a UK airdate was ever scheduled, however BBC UKTV in Australia did intend to broadcast the episode in January 2022. In 2023, Binns was convicted for possession of child sex abuse imagery. A segment from the episode - not featuring Binns - was released on Channel 4's official YouTube channel, as part of a compilation of highlights from the show, in April 2025.

No. overall	No. in series	Original air date	Sean/Guest's Team	Jon's Team	Dictionary Corner Guest	Scores	UK viewers (millions)
—	—	N/A	Joe Wilkinson	Katherine Ryan	Tom Binns as Ivan Brackenbury	47–40	N/A

== See also ==
- List of 8 Out of 10 Cats episodes
