= Benedict Spence =

English cinematographer

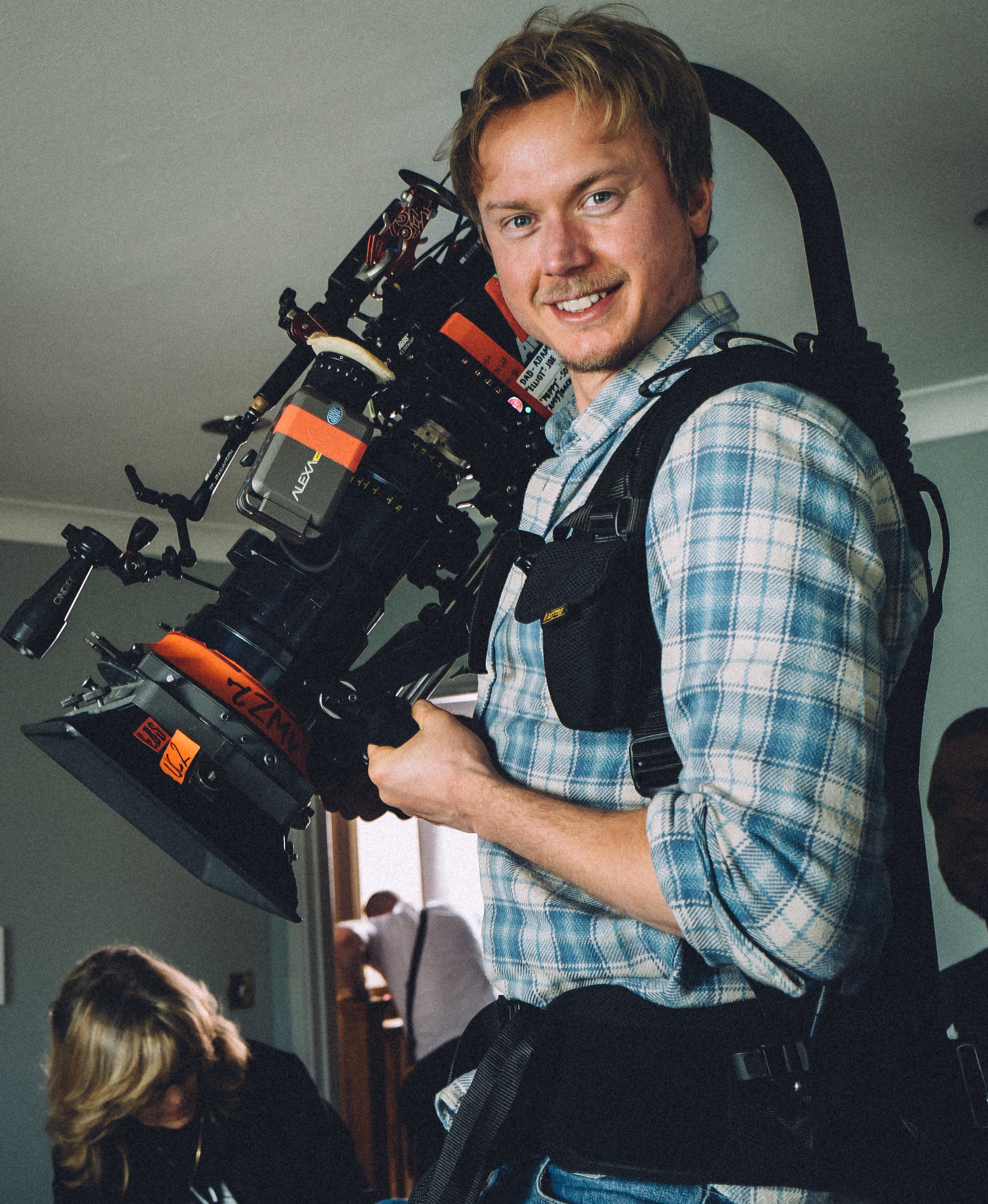
- Occupation: Cinematographer/director of photography
- Website: www.benedictspence.com

Benedict Spence is an English cinematographer and director of photography. His cinematography credits include Witless, In My Skin, GameFace, The End of the F***ing World, This Is Going to Hurt and the Netflix psychological drama miniseries Eric.

Spence received a Primetime Emmy Award nomination in 2020 for The End of the F***ing World. His cinematography for Netflix's Eric earned him Royal Television Society and British Society of Cinematographers awards in 2024 and 2025, along with a 2025 BAFTA Television Craft Award nomination.

== Career ==
Spence began his career in factual entertainment, shooting programmes for the BBC, MTV and Sky before moving into commercial productions, music videos and television dramas. His early credits also include steadicam operating on The Inbetweeners Movie and camera supervisor on Sky Living's The Face featuring Naomi Campbell.

He worked on music videos for artists including Beth Ditto and Leona Lewis, and TV commercials for companies including Sony, Carphone Warehouse and Asda. His subsequent television credits included the BBC comedy series Witless (2016) and the Channel 4 comedy-drama GameFace (2017).

In 2017, Spence was cinematographer on The Blue Door, nominated by BAFTA for the Best British Short in 2019, and worked on all five episodes of the BATFA award-winning In My Skin. The production won the Television Drama award at the 2019 BAFTA Cymru Awards.

In 2019, he served as cinematographer on four episodes of the second series of the Channel 4 and Netflix dark comedy-drama The End of the F**ing World*. His work on the series earned him a nomination for Outstanding Cinematography for a Single-Camera Series (Half-Hour) at the 2020 Primetime Emmy Awards.

In 2020, Spence worked as director of photography on the BBC comedy series Mister Winner, starring Spencer Jones. He then collaborated again with Forbes on the BBC and AMC medical comedy-drama This Is Going to Hurt (2022), starring Ben Whishaw.

In 2024, he served as director of photography for the six-episode Netflix psychological drama miniseries Eric, directed by Forbes and starring Benedict Cumberbatch.

== Selected filmography ==
Year	Title	Type	Role	Notes
2011	Nothing but the Beat	Documentary film	Director of photography	
2011	The Inbetweeners Movie	Feature film	Steadicam operator	
2013	The Face	Reality television series	Camera supervisor	
2016	Witless	Television series	Cinematographer	
2017	GameFace	Television series	Cinematographer	Series 1
2017	The Blue Door	Short film	Cinematographer	Nominated for the 2019 BAFTA Award for Best British Short Film
2019	The End of the F***ing World	Television series	Director of photography	Series 2, 4 episodes
2020	In My Skin	Television series	Director of photography	Series 1, 5 episodes
2020	Mister Winner	Television series	Director of photography	6 episodes
2022	This Is Going to Hurt	Television miniseries	Cinematographer	4 episodes
2024	Eric	Television miniseries	Director of photography	6 episodes

== Awards and nominations ==
Year	Award	Category	Work	Result
2020	Primetime Emmy Awards	Outstanding Cinematography for a Single-Camera Series (Half-Hour)	The End of the F***ing World	Nominated
2024	Royal Television Society Craft & Design Awards	Photography – Scripted	Eric	Won
2025	British Society of Cinematographers Awards	Best Cinematography in a Television Drama (International/Streaming)	Eric	Won
2025	British Academy Television Craft Awards	Photography & Lighting: Fiction	Eric	Nominated
