= New Acts of the Year Show =

NATYS: New Acts of the Year Showcase
- Awarded for: Annual industry showcase for emerging Comedy and Variety acts
- Country: England, United Kingdom
- Presented by: New Variety Lives
- First award: 1982
- Website: https://www.newvarietylives.com

The NATYS: New Acts of The Year Showcase, previously known as The Hackney Empire New Act of the Year, is an annual industry showcase that promotes new waves of emerging Comedy and Variety acts. It ran at the Hackney Empire Theatre from 1988 until 2010. Since then it has toured round London theatres and performance spaces, playing the Barbican Theatre, Stratford Circus, Bloomsbury Theatre, Leicester Square Theatre and The Bernie Grant Arts Centre.

== History ==
Roland and Claire Muldoon, of underground theatre group CAST, pioneered "new variety", auditioning many of the acts that became the new wave of comedy and performance in the UK. The process evolved into the New Act of the Year Show produced by Claire and compered by Roland from 1982. In 1986 they took over the Hackney Empire and ran the NATY from 1987, with Linda Smith winning that year's award. It is currently produced by New Variety Lives, Which is managed by Roland and Claire Muldoon, alongside Frank Sweeney and Tony Goodrick. The 2011 final was held at the Barbican Theatre, the 2012 final at Stratford Circus and both 2013 and 2014 finals were held at The Bloomsbury Theatre and returning there for the 2015 NATYS Showcase final. The 2016 Showcase Final was held at The Leicester Square Theatre.

Previous winners include Stewart Lee, Ardal O'Hanlon and Linda Smith. Harry Hill, Russell Brand and Simon Amstell were finalists. The final has been compered for many years by alternative comedian Arthur Smith.

In 2004, William Cook of The Guardian wrote that it "may not be the best-known comedy award, but it might well be our most important".

The 2006 final was considered to be "the best since 1994" according to Cook. After the 2011 final, held at the Barbican Centre, Bruce Dessau of the London Evening Standard said the line-up confirmed ‘that there is more to the current comedy boom than Michael McIntyre wannabes exploring their man-drawers’.

In 2012, The Stage described it as a "display of endurance, sweat, and probable performance enhancing drugs", and "the most important show of the year for new comedy and variety talent"

The 2022 installment was co produced by Soho Theatre's New comedy Promoter team and took place at the Bernie Grant Arts Centre in Tottenham. It was hosted by Curtis Walker. As of February 2025, no NATYs has been held since.

== Rules and eligibility ==
Entrants are acts seeking to become established on the live comedy circuit that are not as yet full-time paid professional acts, must have performed for at least one year and have recommendations from two established promoters/agents/venues. Previous finalists do not qualify.

== Winners and finalists ==
2022 - The Bernie Grant Arts Centre (Co-Produced by Soho Theatre)

- Viggo Venn - Top of the Bill
- Roman Harris - First Runner Up
- Dan Wye - Second Runner Up
- Lorna Rose Treen
- Flat & the Curves
- Caroline Madds
- Dee Allum
- Kathryn Higgins
- Adam Flood
- Luke Chilton
- Mark Flynn
- Joshua Bethania
- Andy Watts
- Eugene Dusauzay

2020 - The Hackney Empire

- Ali Woods - Top of the Bill
- Adam Coumas - Runner Up
- Blake AJ - Runner Up
- Sheba Montserrat
- Angelica
- Charlie Partridge
- Iona Fortune (Anna Dominey)
- Jerry Bakewell
- Katherine Kenway
- Rob Copland
- Sue Gives a F**k (Chris Nelson)
- Trevor Bickles

2019 - The Hackney Empire

- Njambi McGrath - Top of The Bill
- Eamon Goodfellow - Second Place
- Mad Ron (Steve Lee) - Third place
- Nicole Harris
- JennyBSide
- Chris Allen
- Nicholas De Santo
- Audrey Heartburn (Tracey Collins)
- Trev Tokabi
- Kuan-Wen Huang
- Matt Hutchinson
- El Baldiniho
- Josh Jones
- Patrick Healy
- Susie Steed

2018 - Rich Mix

- Ada Campe (Naomi Paxton)- Top of The Bill
- Maggie Kowalski - Second Place
- Huge Davies - Joint third place
- Bunny Hopkyns (Bruce Williams) - Joint third place
- Mary O'Connell
- Paul Cox
- Ellis & Rose
- Jake Howie
- Kevin O'Connell
- Amy Hooplovin'
- Wisebowm (Steve Whiteley)
- Dannie Grufferty
- Will Mars
- John Meagher
- Jon Udry

2017 - Leicester Square Theatre

- Raul Kohli- Top of The Bill
- Roland SaundersTV-TV - Second Place
- Sindhu Vee - Joint third place
- Phil Lucas - Joint third place
- Arielle Souma
- Claire Lenahan
- EiLeAnn Harris
- Enda Muldoon
- Joshua Robertson (Yeah Man)
- Lauren Pattison
- Michael Clarke
- Rasputin's Lunchbox
- The Establishment (Dan Lees & Neil Frost)
- The Monks (Yazz Fetto & Kevin Moore)

2016 - Leicester Square Theatre

- Bilal Zafar - Top of the Bill
- Jimmy Bird - second place
- Emma Sidi - joint third place
- Josh Pugh - joint third place
- Revan and Fennel - Fourth place
- Thomas Rackham
- President Obonjo
- Mr Spooky (Joseph Murphy)
- Luca Cupani
- Svetlana the Oligarch's Wife
- Patrick Brusnahan
- Bucket
- Dave Green

2015 - The Bloomsbury Theatre

- Daniel Duffy (Michael Stranney) - Top of the Bill
- Jenny Collier - joint second place
- The Herbert (Spencer Jones) - joint second place
- Francis Foster - third place
  - Ashley Haden
  - Cheekykita
  - Chris Betts
  - Don Biswas
  - The Jest
  - Joe Sutherland
  - Josh R. Cherry
  - Mikey Bharj
  - Nick Elleray
  - Rachel Fairburn
  - Sean Patrick

2014 - The Bloomsbury Theatre

- Alasdair Beckett-King - Top of the Bill
- Garrett Millerick - second place
- Twayna Mayne - joint third place
- Kelly Kingham - joint third place
  - Archie Maddocks
  - Candy Gigi Markham
  - Jo Coffey
  - Nick Hodder
  - Pete Dobbing
  - Thomas Ward
  - Thünderbards
  - Tina T'urner Tea Lady (Tracey Collins)
  - Vinegar
  - Wilson

2013 - The Bloomsbury Theatre

- Paul F Taylor - Top of the Bill
- Sam Savage - runner up
- Darren Walsh - runner up
  - Alex Perry
  - Anna Devitt
  - Quint Fontana (Andy Davies)
  - Fern Brady
  - Four Screws Loose
  - Jay Cowle
  - Jonny & The Baptists
  - Lindsay Sharman
  - Mark Niel
  - Nabil Abdulrahid
  - Nicky Wilkinson
  - Stuart Hossack
  - Tony Marrese

2012 - Stratford Circus

- Patrick Cahill - winner
- Mark Stephenson - second place
- Adams and Rea - third place
  - Bobby Mair
  - Mark Simmons
  - Electro Future Beard Club
  - Luke Meredith
  - Under Dogs
  - Mae Martin
  - Russella
  - Tony Cowards
  - George Rowe
  - Stuart Mitchell
  - Myra Dubois

2011 - The Barbican

- David Mills - winner
- Prince Abdi - joint second place
- Julian Deane - joint second place
- Darius Davies - third place
- Jav Jarquin - fourth place
  - Nat Tapley
  - Steve Aruni & Henry The Hoover
  - Asian Provocateurs
  - Joe Wells
  - Rachel Parris
  - David Trent
  - Tania Edwards
  - McNeil & Pamphilon
  - How do I get up there?

2010 - The Hackney Empire (final show at this venue)

- Abandoman - winner
- Inel Tomlinson - second place
- Frisky & Mannish - third place
- Andrew Ryan - fourth place
  - Luke Benson
  - Jo Selby as Tatiana Ostrakova
  - Luke Graves
  - Giacinto Palmieri
  - Val Lee
  - Nathaniel Metcalfe
  - Alan Hudson
  - Dave Gibson
  - Alyssa Kyria as Ariadne the Greek WAG
  - Richard Rycroft
  - Sir Harold Hackney, Alternative Mayor of London

2009

- Fergus Craig - winner
- Seann Walsh - second place
- David James - third place
  - Ross Ashcroft
  - Ro Campbell
  - Gary Colman
  - Jon Kudlick
  - Lady Garden
  - Grainne Maguire
  - Moonfish Rhumba
  - Craig Murray
  - Colin Owens
  - Jim Park
  - Jason Patterson
  - Piff the Magic Dragon
  - Ahir Shah

2008

- Steve Weiner - winner
- Pippa Evans as Loretta Maine - second place
- Andi Osho - third place
  - Rachel Boxall
  - Dylan Bray
  - Pat Burtscher
  - Brothers Gribble
  - The Heresy Project
  - Gerry Howell
  - Emannual Kenallos as Manos the Greek
  - Frank Sanazi
  - Kate Smurthwaite
  - Christian Steel
  - Vikki Stone
  - Jack Whitehall
  - Imran Yusuf

2007

- Luke Toulson - winner
- Liz Carr - second place
- Gareth Richards - third place
  - Crispin Flintoff - runner-up
  - Christian Lee - runner-up
  - Isma Almas
  - Evie Anderson
  - Tamika Campbell
  - Matt Grantham
  - Dan Hoy
  - Joe Kay
  - Teak Show
  - Holly Walsh
  - David Whitney
  - Maureen Younger

2006

- Joe Wilkinson - winner
- Diane Morgan - second place
- Stuart Goldsmith - third place
  - Paul H Allen
  - Matt Devereux
  - Duncan Edwards
  - Michael Fabbri
  - Helen Keen
  - Sarah-Louise Young
  - Martine Pepper
  - Ray Presto
  - Stanley Silver
  - Al Stick
  - Tomi Walamies
  - Robert White

2005

- Henning Wehn - winner
- Matt Green - second place
- Papa CJ - third place
  - Gareth Berliner
  - Simon Brodkin as Lee 'Nelsy' Nelson
  - Stephen Carlin
  - Janice Phayre
  - Griff Griffiths
  - Simon Green & James Connelly

2004

- Peter Aterman – winner
- Kerry Godliman - second
- Ava Vidal – third equal
  - Jaik Campbell – finalist
  - Roisin Conaty – finalist
  - Nelson David – finalist
  - James Goldbury – finalist
  - Pablo – finalist
  - Del Strain – finalist
  - Reverend Dick Tate – finalist
  - Vinell, Camel, Kiernan – finalist

2003

- Matt Kirshen – winner
- Rhod Gilbert – second
  - Simon Amstell – finalist
  - Del Strain – finalist
  - Ross Wagman - finalist

2002

- Graham Anthony – winner
- Nina Conti – second
  - Steve Day – finalist
  - Henrik Elmer - finalist
  - Vicky Frango – finalist
  - Patrick Monahan – finalist
  - Dave Palmer aka Dave Dynamite – finalist
  - Verity Welch - finalist
  - Graeme Casey - finalist

2001

- Men in Coats – winner
  - Rob Deering – second
  - Les Hommes Sans Noms (Andy Sinclair and Jim Woodcock- finalist
  - James Holmes – finalist
  - Inder Manocha - finalist
  - Adrian Poynton - finalist

2000

- Paul Hickman – winner
- Shaparak Khorsandi - second
- Mark Felgate – finalist
  - Russell Brand – finalist
  - Francesca Martinez – finalist
  - The Funjabis – finalists
  - John Ryan – finalist
  - Cole Parker – finalist

1999

- Anton - winner
- Daniel Kitson - runner-up
- Paul Sinha – third
  - Mary Bourke – finalist
  - Shirley Goorwich - finalist
  - Sally Smith - finalist

1998

- Hitchcock's Half Hour (Neil Cole and Tom Hillenbrand) - winner
- Jocelyn Jee Esien - third
  - Catherine Tate - finalist
  - Susan Vale - finalist
  - Micky Flanagan - finalist
  - Lee Canterbury - finalist

1997

- Jon Reed – winner
- The Fluffy Brothers
- Natalie Haynes
- R David

1996

- Noel Britten – winner
- Gina Yashere - 2nd
- Dan Evans - 3rd
- Will Smith - 4th
- Dean Kelly - finalist
- Mike Gunn - finalist
- Veronica McKenzie - finalist
- Hovis Presley - finalist
- Cornish Patsy - finalist
- Alex Marion - finalist
- Mal Kay - finalist
- Seanie Conran - finalist
- Arthur Smith - compere

1995

- Lee Mack - finalist

1994 - The Hackney Empire

- Ardal O'Hanlon/Wara - joint winners
- Ricky Grover - third
- Kevin Gildea - fourth
  - Junior Simpson - finalist
  - Simon Lipson - finalist
  - Simon Pegg - finalist

1993

- Ronni Ancona - winner
- Tim Vine – runner-up
- Mel Barnes (Wilson) - finalist
- Sally Holloway - finalist
  - Pommy Johnson - finalist
  - Simon Lipson - finalist
  - Ben Miller - finalist
  - Jack Russell - finalist

1991

- Paul Tonkinson - winner
  - Nick Wilty - finalist
  - Neville Raven - finalist
  - Martin Davies - finalist
  - Oliver Turnbull - finalist

1990

- Stewart Lee - winner

1989

- Keith Dover – winner
  - Niall MacAnna - second

1987

- Linda Smith – winner
