= Lisa McGrillis =

British actress (born 1982)

- McGrillis in 2026
- Born: 3 September 1982 (age 44); Cheltenham, Gloucestershire, England
- Education: Northumbria University (BA)
- Occupation: Actor
- Spouse: Stuart Martin (m. 2015)
- Children: 2

Lisa McGrillis (born 3 September 1982) is a British actress. Her credits include Hebburn (2012–2013), The Pass (2016), Inspector George Gently (2014–2017), Mum (2016–2019), No Offence (2015–2018), Death in Paradise (2019), Deadwater Fell (2020), Last Night in Soho (2021), Avoidance (2022), Maternal (2023), Sex Education (2023), and Rivals (2024).

== Early life and education ==
McGrillis was born in Cheltenham, Gloucestershire, but at age five, moved to and grew up in Scotby, near Carlisle in Cumbria, with her mother, a special education teacher, and her father, an accountant. She attended Trinity School, Carlisle, before going on to study performing arts at Northumbria University.

== Career ==
McGrillis had a role in The Pitmen Painters, by Lee Hall, in 2007. It transferred to London's National Theatre and then to Broadway.

McGrillis was in Much Ado About Nothing at Shakespeare's Globe in 2011 as Margaret the maid. When Eve Best, the star of the show, fell ill, director Jeremy Herrin asked McGrillis to step up to play Beatrice. She then appeared in The Pass with Russell Tovey at the Royal Court Theatre in 2014.

After appearing in Hebburn, McGrillis was the regular character DS Rachel Coles in Inspector George Gently with Martin Shaw.

McGrillis starred opposite Academy Award nominee Lesley Manville in the BBC sitcom Mum (2018) as Kelly, the girlfriend of Manville's son, Jason. In February 2019, she played Hannah Wilde in episode eight of the eighth season of Death in Paradise. She later played a grass-roots Manchester politician in the third series of Channel 4 Paul Abbott police drama No Offence and, in 2020, appeared as 'Mad Kay' in BBC sitcom King Gary, written by Tom Davis and as Sandra in the Channel 4 drama Deadwater Fell.

On 17 January 2022, it was announced that McGrillis would star as Courtney in BBC comedy Avoidance (2022), alongside show creator Romesh Ranganathan and Jessica Knappett. In 2023, she played the main role of Helen Cavendish in the ITV drama Maternal (2023).

In 2024, she appeared alongside David Tennant, Aidan Turner, Danny Dyer and Katherine Parkinson in the Disney+ adaptation of Jilly Cooper's Rivals (2024).

McGrillis was cast as Adrian Mole's mother, alongside Oliver Savell as Mole, in a television adaptation of the Sue Townsend 1982 novel The Secret Diary of Adrian Mole, Aged 13¾, with David Nicholls and Caitlin Moran among the writers and filming taking place in 2026.

== Personal life ==
Her husband, Stuart Martin, is also an actor; they met at a Christmas party in the National Theatre bar. They have two children. McGrillis is an ambassador for children's charity PIPA.

== Filmography ==
=== Film ===
Year	Title	Role	Notes
2007	The Other Possibility	Angalina	
2016	The Pass	Lyndsey	
2018	Wild Geese	Polly	Short film
2018	Only You	Carly	
2021	Last Night in Soho	Female Detective	

=== Television ===
Key
†	Denotes television productions that have not yet been released

Year	Title	Role	Notes
2006	Spit Game	Receptionist	Television film
2012–2013	Hebburn	Vicki Pearson	Main role
2014–2017	Inspector George Gently	Sergeant Rachel Coles	Main role; Series 6—8
2015	Fungus the Bogeyman	Saliva	2 episodes; TV mini-series
2015–2018	No Offence	Caroline McCoy	Recurring role; Series 3
2016–2019	Mum	Kelly	Main role
2019	Death in Paradise	Hannah Wilde	Season 8, Episode 8
2020	Deadwater Fell	Sandra McKay	4 episodes
2020	Bumps	Joanne	Television film
2020–2021	King Gary	Kay / Mad Kay	Recurring role
2022	Somewhere Boy	Sue	Main role
2022–present	Avoidance	Courtney	Main role
2023	Maternal	Helen Cavendish	Main role; ITV
2023	Best Interests	Brenda	4 episodes
2023	Sex Education	Joanna Franklin	Recurring role
2024–present	Rivals	Valerie Jones	Main role
2024	Krapopolis	Kayleigh (voice)	Recurring role
2025	Film Club	Steph	Recurring role
2026	Saturday Night Live UK	Herself - Guest Cameo	Season 2, Episode 4
TBA	The Secret Diary of Adrian Mole Aged 13¾ †	Pauline Mole	Recurring role
