= The Pass (2016 film) =

- British release poster
- Directed by: Ben A. Williams
- Written by: John Donnelly
- Produced by: Duncan Kenworthy
- Starring: Russell Tovey, Arinze Kene, Lisa McGrillis, Nico Mirallegro
- Cinematography: Chris O'Driscoll
- Edited by: Masahiro Hirakubo; Justine Wright
- Production company: Toledo Productions
- Distributed by: Lionsgate
- Release dates: 16 March 2016 (BFI Flare: London LGBT Film Festival); 8 May 2018
- Running time: 87 minutes
- Country: United Kingdom
- Language: English

The Pass is a 2016 film starring Russell Tovey and Arinze Kene. It was directed by Ben A. Williams, based on a play by John Donnelly. The film is about a relationship between two men who are English football players, and how their lives unfold over the course of a decade. The film was nominated at the 2017 BAFTA Awards, in the category of Outstanding Debut by a British Writer, Director or Producer for John Donnelly and Ben Williams.

== Plot ==
Nineteen-year-olds Jason and Ade have been in the academy of a famous London football club since they were eight years old. It's the night before their first-ever game for the first team – a Champions League match – and they're in a hotel room in Romania. After spending the evening together, one of them kisses the other. The impact of this 'pass' reverberates through the next ten years of their lives.

== Cast ==
- Russell Tovey as Jason
- Arinzé Kene as Ade
- Lisa McGrillis as Lyndsey
- Nico Mirallegro as Harry
- Rory J. Saper as Bellboy

== Reception ==
As an independent feature, the film received a limited screening, primarily being shown around the world at film festivals. The film had a special screening at London's BFI Flare Film Festival, in correspondence with their celebration of LGBT cinema.

The Pass holds a 93% approval rating on review aggregator website Rotten Tomatoes, based on 13 reviews, with a weighted average of 7.1/10. The film holds a score of 66% on Metacritic.

Empire gave it three out of five stars and said "Russell Tovey gives a layered, career-best performance in an intense interior drama that never quite shakes its theatrical origins". The Guardian gave it four out of five stars and said "Its stage roots show through at times, but this story of homoerotic tension between two youth team players is well made and acted".

== Release ==
The film premiered as the opening film of the BFI Flare London LGBT Film Festival on 16 March 2016 at the Odeon Leicester Square. It was released in the UK and Ireland on 9 December 2016. The film was released on DVD and Amazon and YouTube to stream online in the UK in April 2017. The U.S. premiere for the film was on 7 July 2017 at the Outfest Film Festival in Los Angeles.

In 2018 it was announced that The Orchard had picked up the film for U.S. distribution, with the film releasing on 8 May 2018.
