= Gillian McKeith (song) =

Single by Brett Domino
- Released: 22 November 2010
- Recorded: 2010
- Genre: Comedy
- Songwriter(s): Brett Domino

"Gillian McKeith" is a song written by Brett Domino in 2010. It was released as a single on 22 November 2010, charting at number 29 in the United Kingdom.

The comedy song was written about the eponymous Gillian McKeith, a celebrity nutritionist famous for presenting television programmes such as You Are What You Eat, who was competing in the tenth series of the reality television series I'm a Celebrity...Get Me Out of Here!

== Background ==
Gillian McKeith describes herself as a British nutritionist; She became well known for presenting shows presenting healthy living, most notably You Are What You Eat. She was invited to appear on the reality television programme I'm a Celebrity...Get Me Out of Here! in 2010. During her time in the Australian jungle, she was regularly chosen to take part in a variety of tasks involving the consumption of creatures not usually eaten by humans such as insects and spiders, as well as larger body parts of animals. Despite agreeing to participate in the programme, McKeith upset her fellow celebrity campmates by refusing to attempt the tasks. There were also suspicions of her faking phobias to gain publicity, while she continually pretended to faint during the tasks.

Brett Domino is the alter-ego of Rob J Madin, a musician who has had success with his comedy videos on the video-sharing website YouTube. He wrote the song about McKeith, despite not having watched I'm a Celebrity...Get Me Out of Here! He was short of material for a comedy gig, so decided to write a song about something that was trending on Twitter that week.

== Release ==
The song was released on 22 November 2010 on the iTunes Store. The single received support from Chris Moyles, who played the song multiple times on his breakfast show during the week. In its first week it entered the chart at number 29, above new entries from established acts Kylie Minogue, Usher and Gorillaz, as well as the newly digitised Beatles song "Let it Be".
