= Njambi McGrath =

Kenyan-British comedian

- Born: Kenya
- Occupations: Comedian, actor
- Years active: 2010–present

Njambi McGrath is a Kenyan-British comedian and actor.

== Background ==
McGrath was born in Kenya. She grew up in Riara Ridge, near Limuru. She later moved to the United Kingdom and then to New York, where she met her husband, Dave. She speaks English, Swahili and Gikuyu. McGrath lives with her husband and two daughters in Ealing.

== Career ==
McGrath has performed annually at the Edinburgh Fringe since 2013. Her 2020 memoir Through the Leopard's Gaze, published by Jacaranda Books, was optioned by Expectation Entertainment.

== Awards ==
McGrath reached the final heat of the 2013 BBC New Comedy Awards and the first heat of the 2014 competition. She was nominated for Best Female Newcomer at the 2013 Black Comedy Awards. She won the 2019 NATYS: New Acts of the Year Show.

== Radio ==
- Becoming Njambi (2021) – BBC Radio 4
- The Good, The Bad And The Unexpected (2020) – BBC Radio Scotland
- Breaking the News (2019) – BBC Radio Scotland

== Filmography ==
- What the Frick (2020) – Imani

== Bibliography ==
- Through the Leopard's Gaze (2020) – memoir
