= Maternal (TV series) =

British television drama

- Genre: Medical drama
- Created by: Jacqui Honess-Martin
- Written by: Jacqui Honess-Martin
- Starring: Parminder Nagra; Lara Pulver; Lisa McGrillis
- Composer: Emilie Levienaise-Farrouch
- Country of origin: United Kingdom
- Original language: English
- No. of series: 1
- No. of episodes: 6

Production
- Executive producers: James Griffiths; Kathryn Pugsley; Patrick Spence
- Producer: Betsan Morris Evans
- Running time: 59 minutes
- Production company: ITV Studios

Original release
- Network: ITV
- Release: 16 January – 20 February 2023

Maternal is a British medical drama television drama series created by Jacqui Honess-Martin. The series began broadcast on ITV on 16 January 2023, as well as on ITVX. The show was cancelled after one season.

== Plot ==
Following the first wave of the COVID-19 pandemic, three female doctors return to frontline medicine after their maternity leave.

== Cast ==
- Parminder Nagra as Dr. Maryam Afridi
- Lara Pulver as Dr. Catherine MacDiarmid
- Lisa McGrillis as Dr. Helen Cavendish
- Raza Jaffrey as Dr. Jack Oliviera
- Oliver Chris as Dr. Guy Cavendish
- Abhin Galeya as Raz Farooqui
- Julie Graham as Dr. Susan Fisher
- Elizabeth Dulau as Dr. Louise Pennycook
- Alexander Karim as Lars Nordstrom

== Production ==
The series was inspired by real surgeon Zoe Barber, who works at the Royal Glamorgan Hospital in Llantrisant. The series was playwright Jacqui Honess-Martin's television debut.

Although set in Manchester, Maternal filmed in Liverpool including at Edge Hill Health Centre and Liverpool Innovation Park.

== Episodes ==
All episodes were made available on ITVX on 16 January 2023, prior to their linear broadcast.

No.	Title	Directed by	Written by	Original release date	U.K. viewers (millions)
1	"Episode 1"	James Griffiths	Jacqui Honess-Martin	16 January 2023	N/A
2	"Episode 2"	James Griffiths	Jacqui Honess-Martin	23 January 2023	N/A
3	"Episode 3"	Amanda Blue	Jacqui Honess-Martin	30 January 2023	N/A
4	"Episode 4"	Amanda Blue	Jacqui Honess-Martin	6 February 2023	N/A
5	"Episode 5"	Rebecca Gatward	Jacqui Honess-Martin	13 February 2023	N/A
6	"Episode 6"	Rebecca Gatward	Jacqui Honess-Martin	20 February 2023	N/A

== Reception ==
The series received positive reviews from critics. Isobel Lewis from The Independent gave the first episode four out of five stars, praising the acting, dialogue and topicality of the drama. Lucy Mangan of The Guardian awarded the first episode four stars out of five, praising the depth of the three lead characters, and remarked that it had 'grit in the storytelling oyster that produces something rather wonderful'. Anita Singh in The Telegraph also gave it four stars out of five, proclaiming it as superior to another recent medical drama, This Is Going to Hurt. In a more mixed review, Carol Midgley in The Times gave it three stars, finding the show reliant on cliches.
