= Brett Domino =

British musician

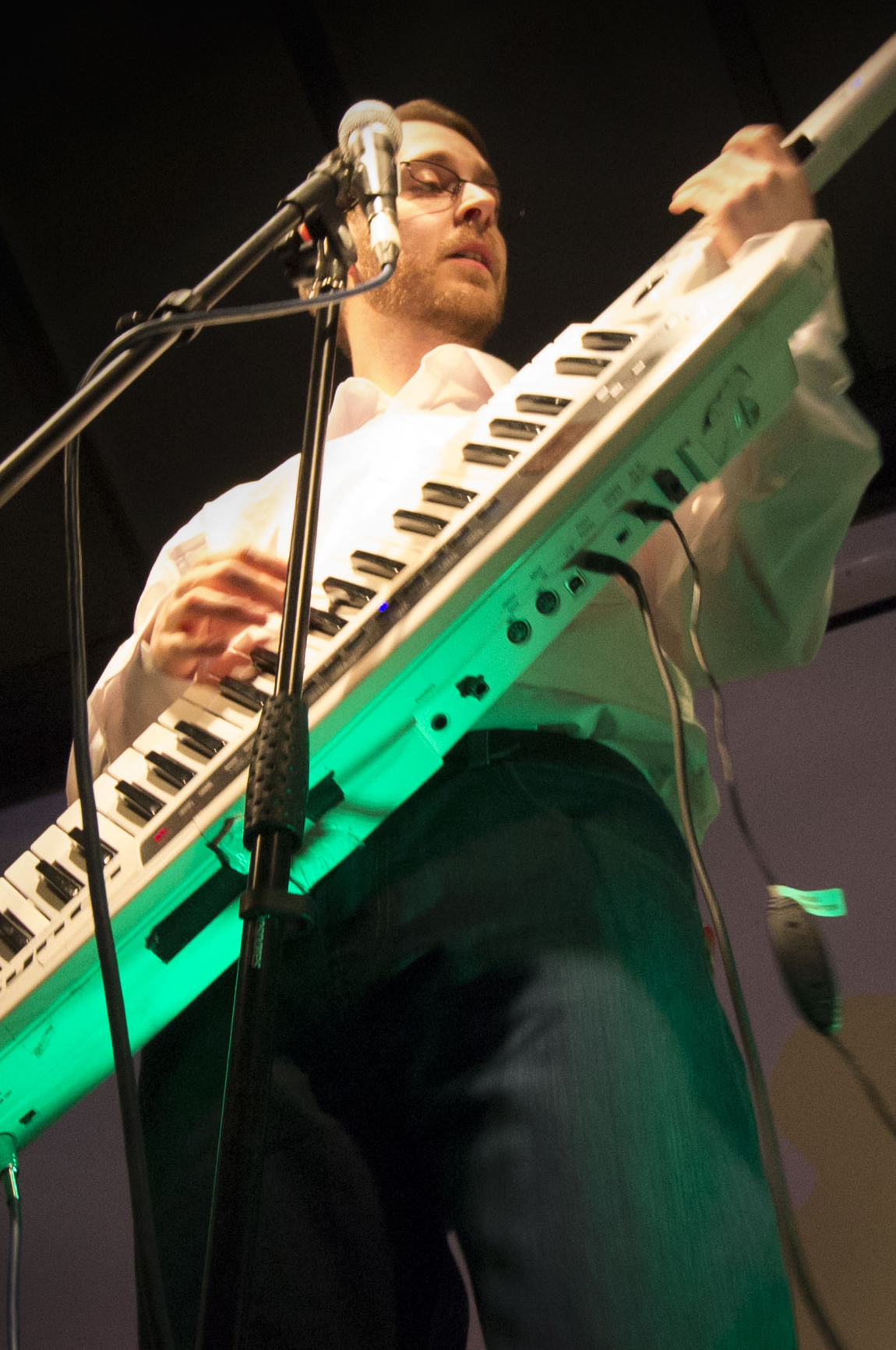
- Domino in 2016

Background information
- Born: Rob J Madin; 5 May 1986 (age 40)
- Genres: Pop; Rock; Electronic; Hip-hop; Funk
- Occupations: Singer-songwriter; comedy act; internet celebrity
- Instruments: As Rob J. Madin: Vocals; Guitar; Bass; Keyboards; Drums; Percussion; As Brett Domino: Vocals; Keytar; Keyboards; Kazoo; Ukulele; Stylophone; Theremin; Recorder; Skoog; Percussion
- Years active: 2008–present
- Member of: The Brett Domino Trio
- Website: www.brettdomino.com

Brett Domino is the alter-ego of British musician and comedian Rob J Madin (born 5 May 1986). As Brett Domino, he is a musician and internet celebrity from Leeds, although Madin is actually from Chesterfield, Derbyshire. He is best known for his YouTube videos, in which he plays covers and original songs on various musical instruments, most notably the keytar. His band, The Brett Domino Trio, currently consists of only two members, Domino and "Steven Peavis" (Ste Anderson), having only been a three-piece for around a year. "Mitch Hutchinson" (Michael Denny) left the band in 2009; he later returned to celebrate the band's fifth anniversary and appear on the finale of Brett Domino's Weekly YouTube Thing.

== Career ==
The Brett Domino Trio were featured a number of times as part of BBC Radio 1's The Chris Moyles Show in 2008, and in 2009 the band appeared on ITV's Britain's Got Talent, performing live as the house band on two episodes of ITV2's sister show, Britain's Got More Talent.

Domino's YouTube videos have received over 31 million views and have been promoted by the likes of Justin Timberlake, Lady Gaga, and Ellie Goulding.

On 22 November 2010, Domino released a song called "Gillian McKeith", a humorous take on the celebrity during her time in the 10th series of the ITV show I'm a Celebrity... Get Me Out of Here!. The YouTube video gained over 1 million views in a week and entered the UK Singles Chart at number 29 on 28 November 2010.

In 2011, Madin introduced a YouTube character named "C-Bomb" — a self-proclaimed dubstep super-producer. On 14 June 2012, BBC Comedy uploaded a specially commissioned C-Bomb music video entitled "Bowl Date" to its website and YouTube channel, followed by a further music video "Mutha Nature" on 4 October 2012.

Domino appeared on Blue Peter, the BBC children's programme, on 1 March 2012, performing a comedy song detailing a shortlist for the best children's book of the last ten years. Domino continued to produce regular musical segments for the show between 2012 and 2020.

In October–November 2012, Madin was commissioned to write a number of Domino songs for the BBC programme Young Apprentice. He wrote five songs that were released weekly via the BBC's YouTube channel.

On 1 July 2013, a 20-minute sitcom pilot entitled C-Bomb was launched on BBC iPlayer and subsequently broadcast on BBC Three. The pilot was written by Madin with Jason Cook and Daniel Peak.

Domino's "How To Make A Hit Pop Song" video was nominated for the Best Internet Comedy Short award at the 2014 British Comedy Awards. Madin and Anderson attended the event as themselves.

Between 2015 and 2016, Domino was a regular guest on ITV's Weekend with Aled Jones, presenting a musical segment, often involving the other guests on the show. On 16 August 2015 he performed a medley of Shaggy songs with Shaggy himself.

The Brett Domino Trio have appeared in Dictionary Corner on 8 Out of 10 Cats Does Countdown in August 2016, January 2017, January 2019, January 2020, February 2020, February 2021 and August 2026.

== Singles ==
Year	Single	Peak chart positions	Album/Purpose
Year	Single	UK	Album/Purpose
2010	"Gillian McKeith"	29	non-album singles
2010	"Fairytale of New York" (cover, with Alexa Goddard)	—	non-album singles
2011	"End of the (News Of The) World"	—	non-album singles
2011	"Ministry of Sound Medley"	—	non-album singles
2011	"I'm a Celebrity 2011"	—	non-album singles
2012	"The Candidates Song – Young Apprentice"	—	non-album singles
2012	"Rags to Recipes Song – Young Apprentice"	—	non-album singles
2012	"The Nick and Karren Song – Young Apprentice"	—	non-album singles
2012	"The Boardroom Song – Young Apprentice"	—	non-album singles
2012	"Alan Sugar Song – Young Apprentice"	—	non-album singles
2013	"Naughty Sexy Funk Woman (NSFW)"	—	non-album singles
2013	"1 In 100"	—	non-album singles
2013	"Parents On Facebook"	—	non-album singles
2014	"Sexy When You Do That"	—	non-album singles
2014	"Pinocchio"	—	non-album singles
2014	"Unfinished Business"	—	non-album singles
2014	"Everybody Needs To Know It's Christmas"	—	non-album singles
2015	"PNCK"	—	non-album singles
2015	"Habanero"	—	non-album singles
2016	"Underdog (Rejected Eurovision Entry)"	—	non-album singles
2017	"All Rhetoric"	—	Funk
2017	"NGC 4945"	—	Funk
2017	"Blackberry"	—	Funk
2017	"Fake Friends"	—	Funk
2017	"Interlude #1"	—	Funk
2017	"(In a) Funk"	—	Funk
2017	"Facsimile"	—	Funk
2017	"Fuchsia"	—	Funk
2017	"Magic Cane"	—	Funk
2017	"Shade"	—	Funk
2017	"Interlude #2"	—	Funk
2017	"Douche"	—	Funk
2017	"Interlude #3"	—	Funk
2017	"Tongue Tied"	—	Funk
2017	"Tongue Tied - Live at Sheffield City Hall"	-	Brettrospective
2019	"Lunchtime Lover"	—	Keytar Your Heart
2020	"I Think I'm in Love with the Girl Who Works on Checkout Six in Decathlon"	-	Keytar Your Heart
2020	"Bin Guy (A Song Containing Exclusively Three Letter Words"	-	Keytar Your Heart
2020	"Hello Mistletoe"	—	non-album singles
2021	"The Pub"	—	non-album singles
2021	"Cautious Hugger"	—	non-album singles
2021	"Spook Me Up"	-	Brettrospective
2022	"Dynamite (Excerpt from Oregon Exploding Whale 1970: The Musical)	—	Brettrospective
2022	"Baby (I Wanna Be Your Baby, Baby)"	—	Brettrospective
2022	"I'm a Werewolf (Unfortunately)"	-	Brettrospective
2022	"Lola (A Song Containing Exclusively Four Letter Words)"	-	Brettrospective
2022	"A Song About Space"	—	Brettrospective

== Albums ==
=== Songs Off YouTube ===
Release date: 1 March 2011

Track listing:

- Beat It (2011 version)
- Justin Timberlake Medley
- I Feel for You
- We Speak No Americano
- 1980s Stylophone Medley
- Bad Romance
- Jurassic Park Theme
- Ellie Goulding Medley
- Hip-Hop Medley
- Nelly Furtado Medley
- Michael Jackson Medley
- Korn / 50 Cent / Tenna Marie Medley
- Now 75 Medley
- Party In the Park (Radio Aire) Medley
- William Tell Overture (live)
- Track By Track Commentary

=== Reflections ===
Release date: 9 December 2013

Track listing:

- Gz and Hustlas (Intro)
- Earthquake
- UK Top 10 Medley (06.05.12)
- Buck Rogers
- Get Lucky
- Suit & Tie (Interlude)
- Pusher Love Girl
- Beauty and a Beat
- Sexy and I Know It
- E.T.
- Insane in the Brain
- In Paris (Interlude)
- I Been On
- 212
- 1D Medley
- Hey Ya!
- Holy Grail
- Tinie Tempah Medley
- Firework
- Aviation Medley
- Ministry of Sound Medley

=== Funk ===
Release date: 20 January 2017

Fan funded on Kickstarter.

Track listing:

- All Rhetoric
- NGC 4945
- Blackberry
- Fake Friends
- Interlude #1
- (In a) Funk
- Facsimile
- Fuchsia
- Magic Cane
- Shade
- Interlude #2
- Douche
- Interlude #3
- Tongue Tied

=== Keytar Your Heart ===
Release date: 12 June 2020

Track listing:

- Lunchtime Lover
- Bin Guy (A Song Containing Exclusively Three Letter Words)
- Penelope, Please Stop Recommending so Many TV Dramas
- I Think I'm in Love with the Girl Who Works on Checkout Six in Decathlon
- Bad Lips (A Song Created from a Word Cloud of Ed Sheeran Lyrics)
- Happy Birthday (to Whoever)
- Bad Bad Boy
- Get Bumpsy (An Attempt to Bring Back a Range of Obsolete Vocabulary)
- Drop Crotch Jeans (Ode to 2017)
- Pinocchio 2020

=== Brettrospective ===
Release date: 24 November 2023

Track listing:

- Can't Go Back (Brettrospective Theme)
- A Song About Space
- Boom Boom (Hooked on My Perfume) - 2023 Version
- Spook Me Up
- One in a Hundred - 2023 Mix
- The Pub - 2023 Version
- Dynamite, Pt. 1 (Excerpt from Oregon Exploding Whale 1970: The Musical)
- Dynamite, Pt. 2 (Excerpt from Oregon Exploding Whale 1970: The Musical)
- Cautious Hugger - Extended 2023 Version
- Lola (A Song Containing Exclusively Four Letter Words)
- Tongue Tied - Live at Sheffield City Hall
- I'm a Werewolf (Unfortunately)
- Baby (I Wanna Be Your Baby, Baby) - Extended Version
