= Abandoman =

Irish comedian

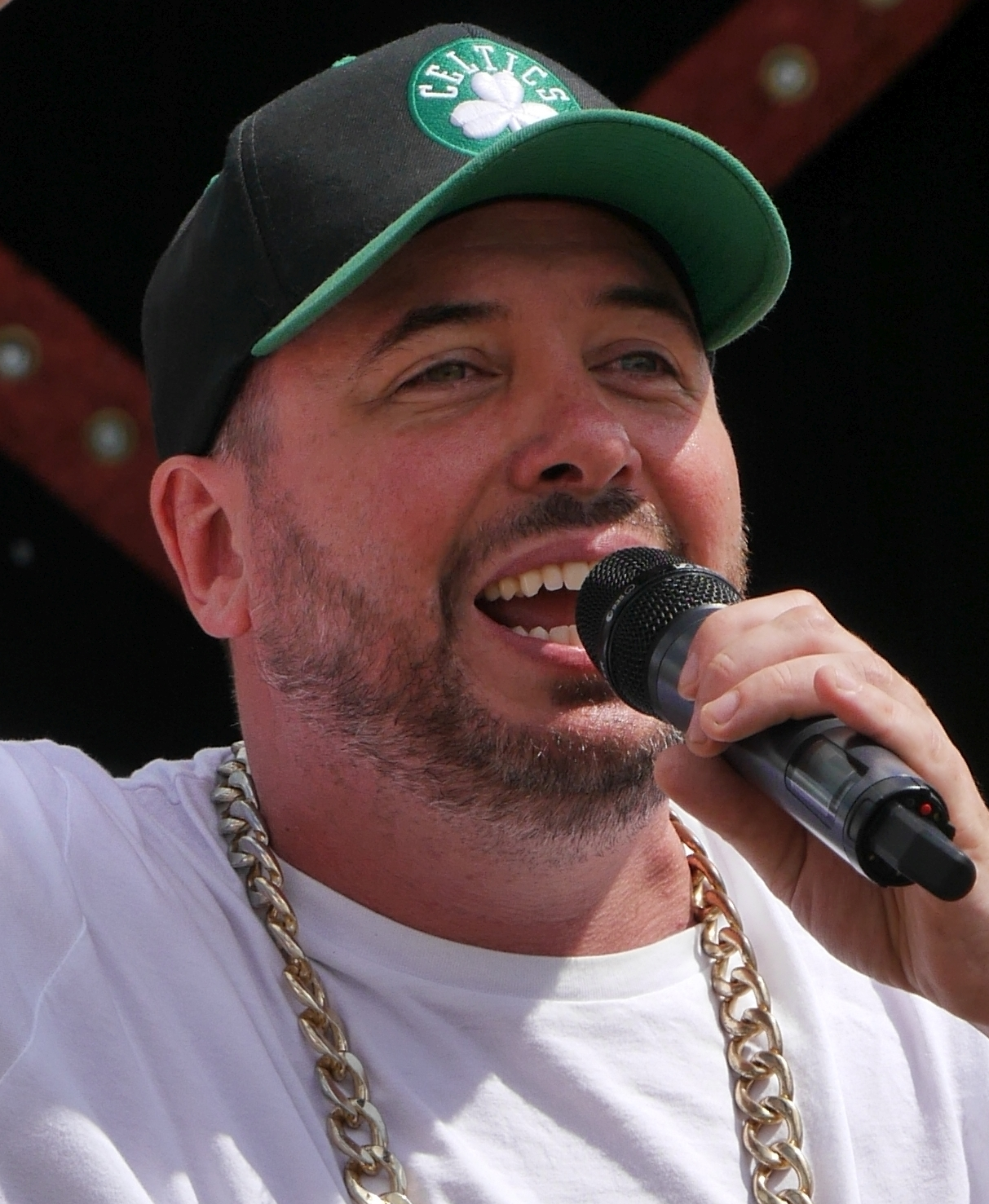
- Rob Broderick as Abandoman, Glastonbury Festival, 2019
- Born: Robert Broderick; Dublin, Ireland

Comedy career
- Years active: 2005–present
- Website: abandoman.com

Robert Broderick, commonly known professionally as Abandoman, is an Irish stand-up comedian who was born in Dublin and now lives and works in London.

== History ==
Broderick improvised his way into the final of the So You Think You're Funny competition at the 2005 Edinburgh Festival Fringe.

Broderick performed his first solo show, entitled Absinthe Without Leave at the 2007 Edinburgh Festival Fringe.

At the 2008 Edinburgh Fringe, he appeared in three shows each day - a solo hip hop/comedy show called Abandoman, a double act (with Padraig Hyland) titled Bitesized! Improvised! Televised! (in which they improvise over movie clips) and a nightly show at the Gilded Balloon called Carnival des Phenomenes.

As part of the Irish improvising hip-hop trio Abandoman he won the 2010 Hackney Empire New Act of the Year Competition. Broderick in particular was described by Chortle as "an engaging frontman and an incredibly quick and skilful improviser". Abandoman were also winners of the 2010 Musical Comedy Awards.

Rob returned to Edinburgh Festival Fringe in 2010 with fellow Abandoman James Hancox. The duo performed their show Pic N Mixtape to a sell-out crowd.

In the same year Rob and James played a wide variety of venues and nights from comedy clubs to music gigs as well as festivals including Bestival, Latitude, Hop Farm Festival (in both 2010 and 2011) and Altitude festival in Méribel.

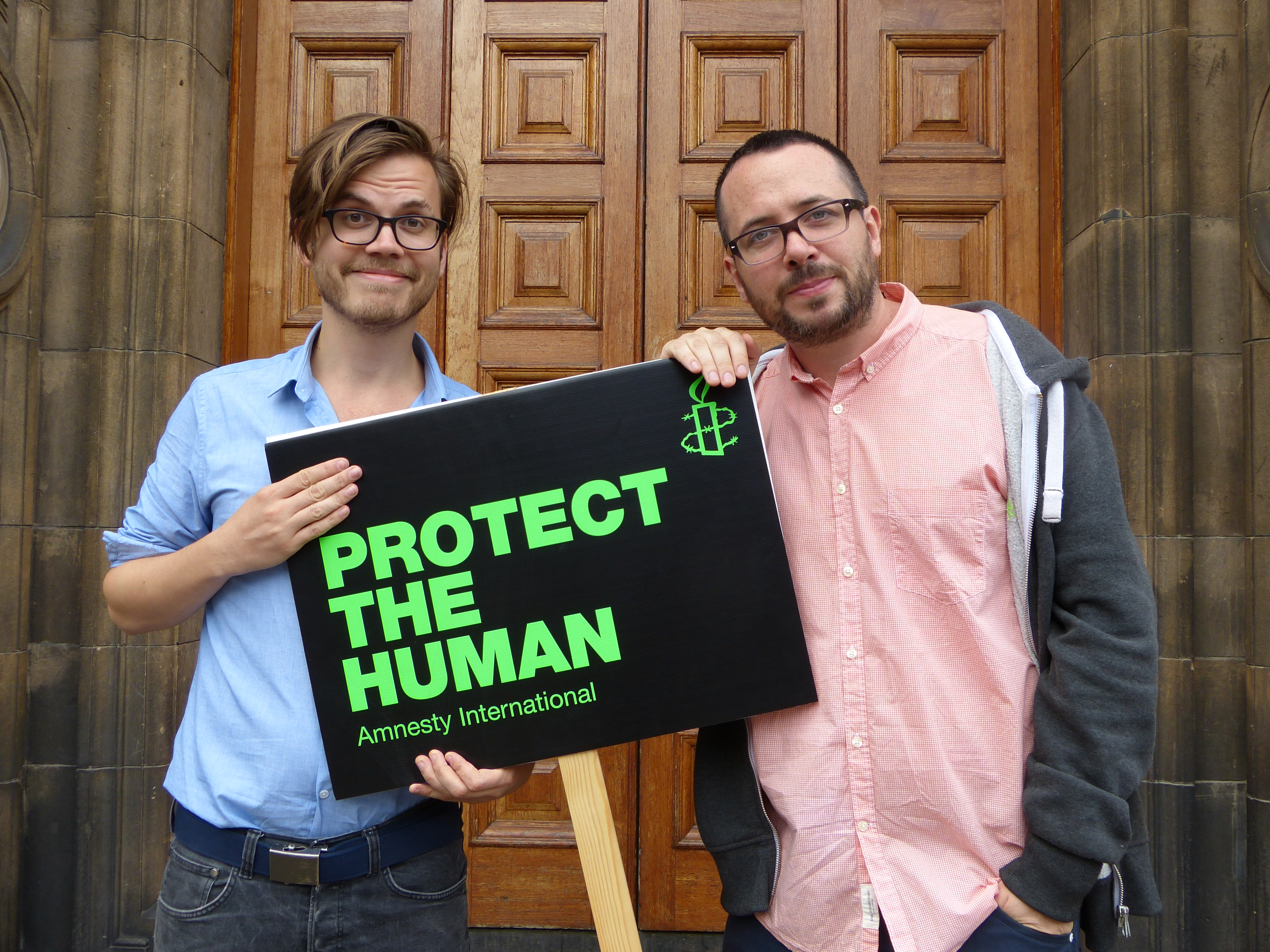
Broderick (right) with James Hancox of Abandoman, 2013

In 2010 they performed on both The Now Show and The Vote Now Show on BBC Radio 4, and were guests on Nick Grimshaw's BBC Radio 1 show and Chris Hawkin's show on BBC 6 Music, where they had a songwriting residency.

Rob and James returned as Abandoman for the 2011 Edinburgh Festival Fringe and performed an improvisational musical based on an audience member.

They were also guests on The Stephen K Amos Show on BBC 2 TV, and on 8 Out of 10 Cats Does Countdown on Channel 4.
