= Huge Davies =

British musical comedian

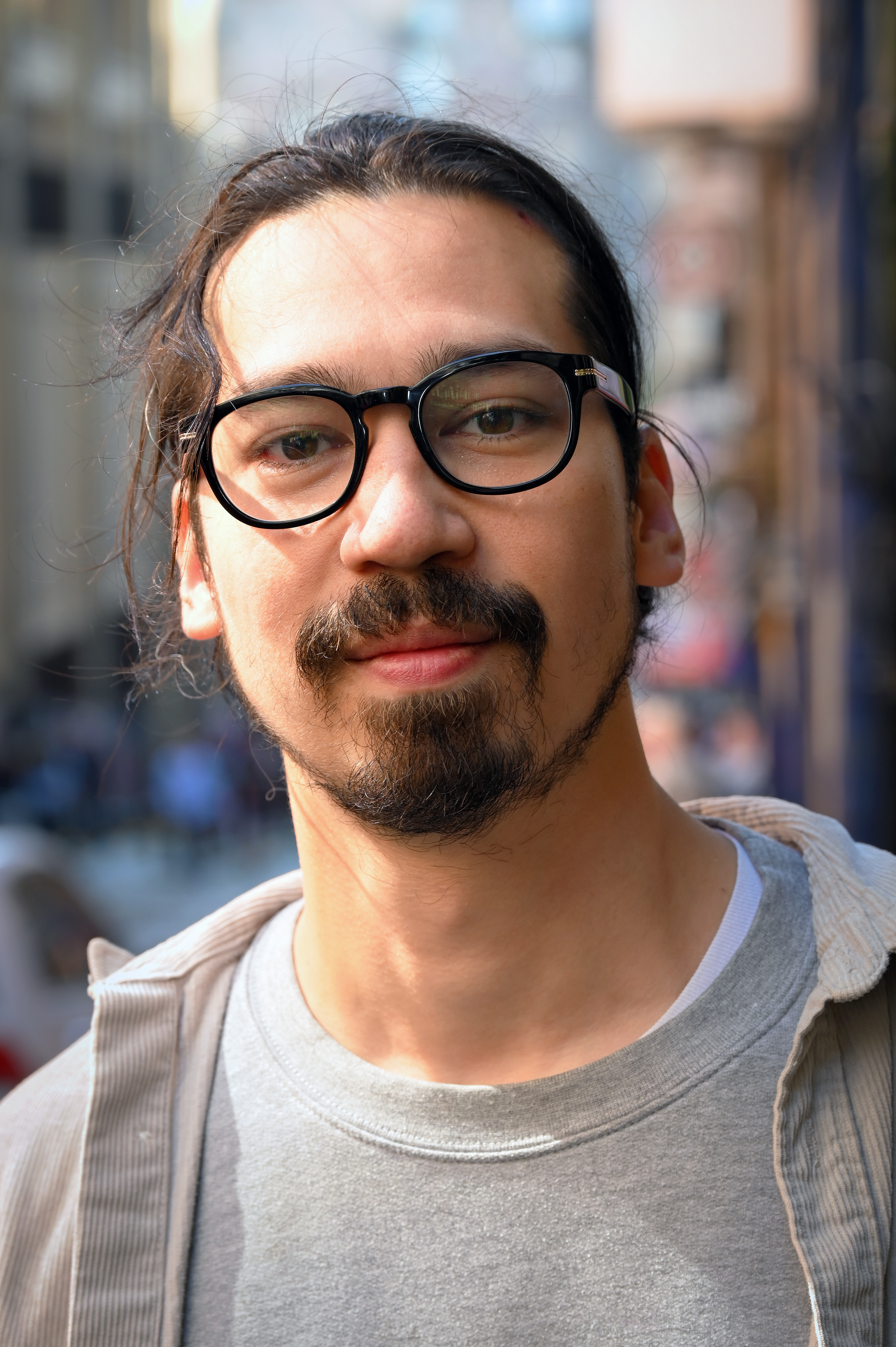
- Davies in 2025
- Born: 26 May 1991 (age 35)
- Education: University of Aberdeen

Comedy career
- Medium: Stand-up, musical comedy, television
- Website: www.hugedavies.com

Hugh Davies (Born 26 May 1991), known by his stage name Huge Davies, is a British musical comedian known for deadpan delivery while wearing a full-size Yamaha keyboard strapped to himself.

== Career ==
Born with the first name Hugh, he performed as Huge, an old nickname, when first performing in Aberdeen, for the sake of non-identification.

Davies was nominated for the Best Newcomer award at the 2019 Edinburgh Festival Fringe for his debut solo show The Carpark which was described as "well-crafted, well-structured and well-performed" by Chortle. The keyboard was described in The Scotsman as "more like a bank of special effects, rather than merely a musical instrument." In 2023, a recording of The Carpark was released by 800 Pound Gorilla Records on YouTube and other streaming platforms.

Davies was a semi-finalist in the BBC New Comedy Award in 2017. Davies has appeared on Comedy Central Live at the Comedy Store, Roast Battle, and as a writer and performer on BBC flagship satirical radio programme The Now Show. Davies acted in BBC Two comedy series The First Team. Davies has appeared on celebrity game show Guessable alongside host Sara Pascoe, Alan Davies and Nish Kumar among others. In 2022, Davies appeared as a guest on two episodes of the British comedy panel show 8 Out of 10 Cats Does Countdown.

On 16 December 2021, Channel 4 commissioned a three-part short-form scripted comedy series, The Artists, created, written by and starring Davies. The series premiered on Channel 4 Comedy YouTube from 30 December 2021 and is available through the on demand service All 4.

In 2023, Davies performed his second show, Whodunnit, at the Edinburgh Festival Fringe. He returned to the festival again in 2024 with his third show, Album for My Ancestors (Dead), which explored themes related to his family history and Indonesian heritage and was nominated for the Malcolm Hardee Award for Cunning Stunt.

In 2024 Davies appeared in Romesh Ranganathan's BBC Series Avoidance, season 2.

Davies co-hosts the Slime Country podcast.

== Filmography ==
Year	Title	Role	Notes
2019	Lazy Susan	Moustache Boy	1 episode
2020	The First Team	Laser Quest Employee	1 episode
2022	Here We Go	Mini Golf Supervisor	1 episode
2024	Avoidance	James	1 episode
2026	F**k Ups	Mr. Bishop	short
