= Bilal Zafar (comedian) =

British comedian (born 1991)

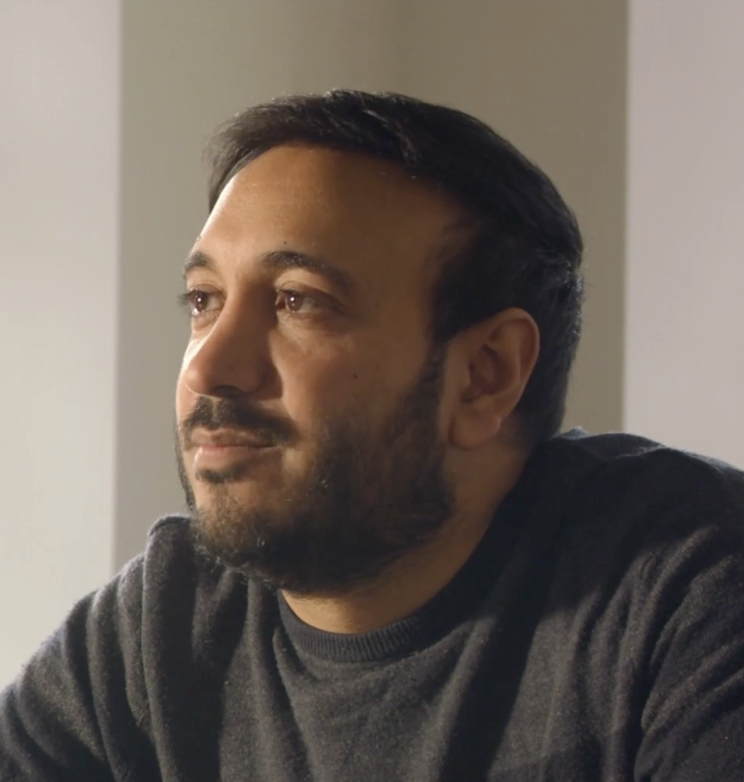
- Zafar in the 2023 film Meeting Dad
- Born: 16 October 1991 (age 34)

Comedy career
- Years active: 2013–present
- Medium: Stand-up comedy
- Genres: Observational humour, Satire
- Subjects: Islamophobia, Racism, Cakes
- Website: www.bilalzafarcomedy.com

Bilal Zafar (born 16 October 1991) is a British comedian who won the New Act of The Year Award (NATY) in 2016 and was nominated for Best Newcomer at the Edinburgh Comedy Awards in the same year. He has written for The Independent and The Guardian.

== Personal life ==
Zafar is from Wanstead, London, and he studied at Wanstead High School before moving to Manchester to study screenwriting at The University of Bolton. He worked part-time as a concierge and a care assistant while living in Manchester. Zafar moved back to London in January 2016.

== Career ==
Zafar began performing stand-up comedy in his final year of university in 2013 and is best known for performing material about racism and islamophobia. He cites Simon Amstell and Chris Morris as influences.

In 2015, Zafar was runner-up in the New Comedian of the Year competition run by Leicester Square Theatre. The following year he won first prize at the NATYS Awards in London at the same venue.

Described as a "wry storyteller", Zafar appeared on the BBC Asian Network's Comedy Show in 2016 and 2017. He has also appeared on BBC Radio Four's Loose Ends and presented one of the station's Stand-Up Specials.

Since 2020 Zafar has attracted a small regular audience and gained the status of Partner for his channel on live-streaming platform Twitch, where he portrays the manager of a football team within the videogame Pro Evolution Soccer 5. The manager character frequently engages his audience of “assistant managers” whose participation in the stream’s chat room and enthusiasm for in-jokes Zafar encourages.
