= Big Babies =

Television series

- Created by: Spencer Jones; Jon Riche
- Written by: Jon Riche; Spencer Jones
- Directed by: Jon Riche
- Starring: Spencer Jones; Martin Collins; Dan Kirwan; Sharon Horgan; Chiron Miller
- Voices of: Spencer Jones; Matthew Steer; Nick Helm; Daniel Cook; Eve Webster; Gabriel Schucan; Doc Brown
- Country of origin: United Kingdom
- Original language: English
- No. of seasons: 1
- No. of episodes: 13

Production
- Executive producer: Japhet Asher
- Producer: Jack Cheshire
- Running time: 14 minutes

Original release
- Network: CBBC BBC Two ABC3
- Release: 15 March – 31 March 2010

Big Babies is a 2010 British comedy children's television series. The main characters are two babies (actually babies with adult heads and voices superimposed) named Brooks and Rocco, who are reluctantly dragged away from watching television to go on unpredictable adventures in the world of the everyday. However, the toys on the shelf always have concerns about what the babies are up to, and get Budge, one of their own, to tag along with the babies (which he does for his own selfish reasons).

It is broadcast on CBBC and BBC Two in the UK, BBC Kids in Canada and ABC3 in Australia. In 2010, Big Babies was nominated for a BAFTA Children's Award in the section of Best Comedy.

== Production ==
The concept of the show (adult heads superimposed on babies' bodies) came from an idea by music video director Jon Riche, who wanted to make a video featuring such an effect. Unable to find a band willing to use the concept, Riche produced a quick proof-of-concept clip with comedian Spencer Jones for a sketch show. Producer Jack Cheshire showed the clip to colleagues at the BBC, which led to the controller of CBBC commissioning a pilot and a thirteen-episode series.

== Characters and cast ==
These are some of the main cast:

=== The Babies ===
- Brooks (born 11 May 2009) (Spencer Jones): The more cynical baby. His catchphrase is "We should have stayed at home and watched the telly!" His primary bonnet is white with bunny ears on top
- Rocco (born 18 April 2009) (Martin Collins): Rocco is the more idealistic baby, complete with a beard. He idolises The Gonch, much to Brooks' disgust. His primary bonnet is white with mouse ears on top.
- The Gonch (born 30 December 2008) (Dan Kirwan): The coolest kid in town, complete with bling bling. Has his own signature tune, and a lot of his dialogue is done in rap. His catchphrase is "Later, losers".

=== Family and other babies ===
- Carole (born 10 November 1981) (Natalia Ferrara, voiced by Sharon Horgan): Brooks' mum.
- Gonch's Stepmum (born 14 June 1980) (Donna Louise Pearce, voiced by Spencer Jones)
- Calais Savoy (born 27 February 2009) (Caroline May Jones): An American baby who is friends with Brooks and Rocco. She appeared on Baby Got Talent but just screamed "Mummy Mummy I'm not eating that!".
- Daisy (born 4 April 2009) (Chiron Miller): Another friend of the boys.

=== The Toys ===
- Budge (born 20 August 1974) (voiced by Doc Brown): A brown corduroy toy, who follows Brooks and Rocco's every move. He is always assigned by the Major to follow the boys, but does so through his desire for snacks (or other things he wants) His catchphrase is "Oh, Bongo!"). He speaks with an African-American accent.
- Dave (born 16 July 1980) (voiced by Spencer Jones): A toy dinosaur who lives on the top of Budge's cupboard. His job is to wake up Budge when needed by knocking on the cupboard door with his tail.
- Eebie and Geebie (both born 8 December 1986) (voiced by Daniel Cook and Eve Webster): Two toy birds who are the first to panic about the outcomes of Brooks and Rocco's adventures. There is a TV show called The Eebie and Geebie Show featuring characters of the two birds, but Carole always turns the TV off just as it starts, much to the birds' disappointment and dismay.
- Major Moustache (born 14 January 1957) (voiced by Nick Helm): A red cat doll with an eye-patch, a huge moustache and medals. He is the leader of the toys.
- Private Popper (born 1 September 1981) (voiced by Matthew Steer): A mouse with a military beret. Popper always sees through Budge's self-centred schemes, but is chastised by the Major for voicing his concerns ("Pipe down, Popper!").
- Koggs (born 24 March 1967) (voiced by Doc Brown): A robot with a Jamaican accent.
- Teddy Bez (born 3 June 1983) (Gabriel Schucan): A teddy bear dressed in a teddy boy style. A silent character, but answers any question with a dance. He resembles Scampi for the Sooty Series.
- Snake (born 29 November 1973) (voiced by Caroline May Jones):
- Puppeteers – Jonny Sabbagh, Will Harper, William Banyard, Mark Jefferis and Sheila Clark

== Episodes ==
1.Ducks

2.Pirates

3.Birthday

4.Market

5.Pet Shop

6.DinoDinoDinoTown

7.Rainy Day

8.The Race

9.Bedside the Seaside

10.Visiting Nanny

11.Arts and Crafts

12.Sleepover

13.Baby's Got Talent
