= Spencer Jones (comedian) =

English actor, comedian, & writer (born 1976)

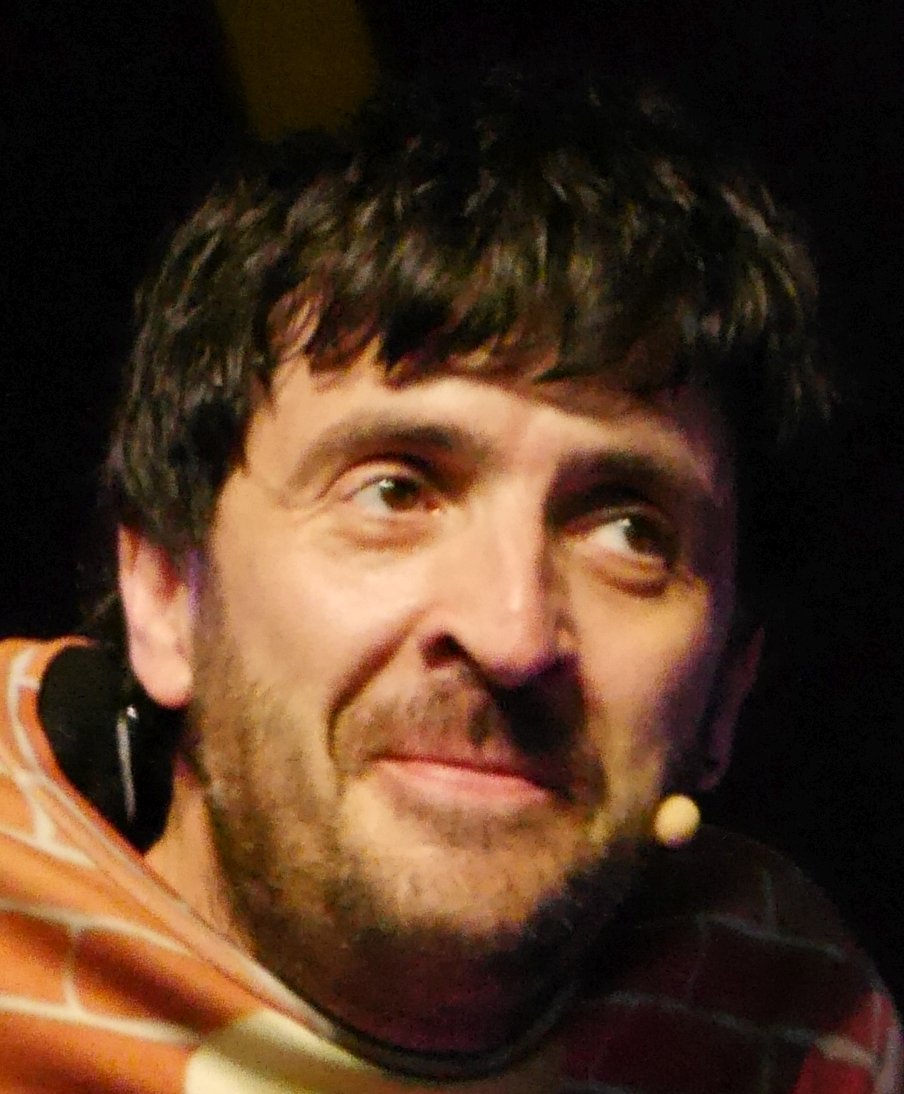
- Spencer Jones, Glastonbury Festival, 2019
- Born: 1976 (age 49–50)
- Notable work: Big Babies; Upstart Crow; Mister Winner; The Mind of Herbert Clunkerdunk

Comedy career
- Medium: Television, stage
- Genres: Character comedy, physical comedy, prop comedy
- Website: www.unitedagents.co.uk/spencer-jones

Spencer Jones is an English actor, comedian and writer. He has performed regularly at the Edinburgh Festival Fringe, and in 2017 and 2019 was nominated for the main prize in the Edinburgh Comedy Awards. He was co-creator and co-star of the BAFTA-nominated CBBC comedy Big Babies, and had a regular role in the sitcom Upstart Crow.

== Career ==
Jones co-created with Jon Riche and co-starred in Big Babies for CBBC in 2010. The series was nominated for the BAFTA Award for best children's comedy that year.

In 2011, he appeared in the play Wedding Band at the Edinburgh Fringe. Subsequently, he has performed in solo shows. He first performed his own show at the Fringe in Bob Slayer's Bookshop in 2014, performing as his character, The Herbert. In 2015 he came joint second (with Jenny Collier) in the New Act of the Year final. He won the Comedian's Choice award (also known as The Barry Award) for both "best show" and "best performer" the same year for his Edinburgh show, The Herbert In Proper Job at another of Bob Slayer's Heroes of Fringe venue, The Hive.

In 2015, Jones wrote and starred in the comedy short Spencer Jones's Christmas for Sky TV's on demand service, which won the 2016 Broadcast Digital Award for Best Scripted Online Short. Jones performed his comedy act on British television for the first time in Live from the BBC, which was broadcast on BBC Two in March 2016.

In 2016, he was nominated for "breakthrough act" and "music and variety award" in the Chortle Awards. However, these categories were won by Joseph Morpurgo and Pippa Evans, respectively.

Jones plays Shakespearean actor William Kempe in the sitcom Upstart Crow, which was broadcast on BBC Two beginning in May 2016. Jones plays the character as a parody of Ricky Gervais using his manner and speech patterns. He was asked to play the character this way to draw a comparison between Kempe, a popular comic actor of the 16th century, and Gervais in the present day; according to the show's producer Gareth Edwards, "what we tried to show was that every era has its own maverick comedy guy who's slightly ahead of his time and is following the beat of a slightly different drum".

In 2016, he again performed his Fringe show in character as The Herbert in a new show called Eggy Bagel, at The Hive. Then, in 2017, he was one of a record nine nominees for the 2017 Edinburgh Comedy Award for his show The Audition at the Monkey Barrel comedy club, a year in which the final award was shared by Hannah Gadsby and John Robins. He returned to the Fringe in 2019 with a new show called The Things We Leave Behind, this time at The Pleasance and was again nominated for the Comedy Award. He also ran an experimental music/variety show at Monkey Barrel called The Spencer Jones 50 Minute Disco Experiment.

Jones starred as the titular character in the pilot episode of The Mind of Herbert Clunkerdunk in 2018; a full series (5 episodes) aired in 2019; Series 2 (5 episodes) was first broadcast on BBC Two and iPlayer in January 2022. In 2020, he starred as Leslie Winner in Mister Winner on BBC Two, which had previously had a pilot episode broadcast in 2017. Lucy Pearman co-starred as his girlfriend in both series.

Jones's other television credits include Still Open All Hours, Skins, Pulling, Count Arthur Strong, Ted Lasso, and Hollyoaks Later.

== Personal life ==
Jones is married with a son and a daughter. The family lives in Devon.

== Edinburgh Festival Fringe shows ==
Year	Show	Venue	Awards
2014	Spencer Jones is The Herbert	Bob Slayer's Bookshop	
2015	Spencer Jones is The Herbert in Proper Job	Heroes @ The Hive	
2016	Spencer Jones is The Herbert in Eggy Bagel	Heroes @ The Hive	
2017	The Audition	Monkey Barrel	Edinburgh Comedy Awards Main Prize (nominated)
2019	The Things We Leave Behind	The Pleasance	Edinburgh Comedy Awards Main Prize (nominated)
2019	The Spencer Jones 50 Minute Disco Experiment	Monkey Barrel	

== Filmography ==
Year	Title	Role	Notes
2010	Big Babies	Brooks	13 episodes
2012	Skins	Dr. Proctor	Series 6 Episode 6 ("Nick")
2012	Hollyoaks Later	Dave	5 episodes
2015	Spencer Jones's Christmas	Dad	
2016	Still Open All Hours	Kevin	Series 2 Episode 5
2016–2020	Upstart Crow	Kempe	
2016	Live from the BBC	Himself (stand-up)	1 episode
2017 (pilot); 2020–present	Mister Winner	Leslie Winner	Also writes additional material
2018–Present	The Mind of Herbert Clunkerdunk	Herbert Clunkerdunk	Series 1: 5 episodes; Series 2: 5 episodes.
2016–2020	8 Out of 10 Cats Does Countdown	Himself (Dictionary Corner)	Series 16 Episode 8 Series 17 Episode 5 Series 19 Episode 5
2020	Worzel Gummidge	Reggie	1 episode ("Saucy Nancy")
2023	Ted Lasso	Deryck	5 episodes
2023	Beyond Paradise	Atticus Styles	1 episode (“Episode 6”)
