= Avoidance (TV series) =

British comedy drama television series

- Genre: Comedy drama
- Created by: Benjamin Green; Romesh Ranganathan
- Written by: Benjamin Green; Romesh Ranganathan; Shaun Pye; Kefi Chadwick; Neil Webster; Jessica Knappett
- Directed by: Benjamin Green
- Starring: Romesh Ranganathan; Lisa McGrillis; Mandeep Dhillon; Jessica Knappett; Kieran Logendra
- Country of origin: United Kingdom
- Original language: English
- No. of series: 2
- No. of episodes: 12

Production
- Executive producers: Michelle Farr-Scott; Benjamin Green; Romesh Ranganathan; Danielle Lux
- Producer: Arnold Widdowson
- Running time: 28 minutes
- Production companies: Ranga Bee; CPL Productions

Original release
- Network: BBC One
- Release: 10 June 2022 – 5 April 2024

Avoidance is a British comedy drama television series made for BBC One starring Romesh Ranganathan, Lisa McGrillis, Mandeep Dhillon, Jessica Knappett and Kieran Logendra. The first series was broadcast from 10 June 2022. A second series was commissioned in May 2023 and was broadcast from 5 April 2024.

== Plot ==
Thrown out by his partner Claire, Jonathan is so desperate to avoid difficult conversations, that rather than telling his son that his mum and dad are splitting up, he takes the young Spencer to hide out with his sister Danielle and her wife Courtney.

== Cast and characters ==
- Romesh Ranganathan as Jonathan
- Lisa McGrillis as Courtney
- Jessica Knappett as Claire
- Mandeep Dhillon as Danielle
- Kieran Logendra as Spencer
- Tony Jayawardena as Keith (series 1)
- Matthew Lewis as Brett (series 2)
- Aisling Bea as Megan (series 2)
- Olive Tennant as Sam (series 2)

== Production ==
The project was announced by the BBC in January 2022, with Benjamin Green and Romesh Ranganathan as show creators, Green as director, and McGrillis and Knappett as co-stars. Some filming took place in Bracknell, and Berkhamsted.

A second series was commissioned by the BBC in May 2023. Filming on a second series took place in November 2023, with Aisling Bea and Matthew Lewis having joined the cast.

== Broadcast ==
Episode one aired on BBC One and BBC iPlayer at 9:30 pm on 10 June 2022. The second series was broadcast from 5 April 2024 on BBC One with all six episodes available as a boxset on BBC iPlayer.

== Reception ==
Lucy Mangan in The Guardian described a "gentle, truthful, beautifully performed comedy about the ultimate beta male".

The Daily Telegraph labelled the show a "sad-com bore" with Marianka Swain saying "I think we're supposed to sympathise with Jonathan, who may have some underlying mental health issues... But in the two episodes that I've seen, he's essentially a black hole of denial and failure sucking in everyone around him."

Gerard Gilbert for the i newspaper was critical saying that he felt that "Ranganathan as a conflict-avoidant beta male with possible mental-health problems was an interesting idea that was more deserving of the meandering and underpowered script. More of a 'dull-com' if you ask me.".
