= Mister Winner =

British sitcom

- Genre: Comedy
- Written by: Matt Morgan
- Directed by: Andrew Chaplin
- Starring: Spencer Jones; Lucy Pearman; Shaun Williamson
- Country of origin: United Kingdom
- Original language: English

Production
- Producers: Emily Shapland; Chris Sussman; Richard Webb
- Running time: 30 minutes

Original release
- Network: BBC
- Release: 25 March – 29 April 2020

Mister Winner is a British sitcom created for the BBC starring Spencer Jones, Lucy Pearman and Shaun Williamson. It was written by Matt Morgan, with additional material provided by Jones.

A 6-episode season was broadcast in the spring of 2020 following its 2017 pilot.

== Cast ==
- Spencer Jones as Leslie Winner
- Lucy Pearman as Jemma Smith
- Shaun Williamson as Chris Smith
- Leon Annor as Cooper
- Oliver Maltman as Steve

== Episodes ==
No.	Title	Directed by	Original release date
1	"The Piano"	Andrew Chaplin	March 25, 2020
2	"The Decorating Job"	Andrew Chaplin	April 1, 2020
3	"The Interview"	Andrew Chaplin	April 8, 2020
4	"The Package"	Andrew Chaplin	April 15, 2020
5	"The Stag Do"	Andrew Chaplin	April 22, 2020
6	"The Wedding"	Andrew Chaplin	April 29, 2020

== Reception ==
Anita Singh of The Telegraph welcomed the gentleness of the show amid the COVID-19 pandemic. The Independent's Rupert Hawksley praised Jones' performance, but noted that the 10pm weeknight slot harmed a programme comparable to Mr. Bean. Both awarded the show a 3 star review.
