= Jessica Knappett =

English actress and writer (born 1984)

- Born: Jessica Amy Knappett; 9 April 1984 (age 42); Bingley, West Yorkshire, England
- Occupations: Comedian, actress, writer
- Years active: 2005–present
- Height: 177 cm (5 ft 10 in)
- Spouse: Dan Crane (m. 2016)
- Children: 2

Jessica Amy Knappett (born 9 April 1984) is an English comedian, actress, and writer. She is the creator, writer, executive producer, and star of the E4 sitcom Drifters, and appeared as Lisa in The Inbetweeners Movie. She was also one of the writers on the BBC1 sitcom Avoidance, in which she co-stars.

== Early life ==
Jessica Amy Knappett was born on 9 April 1984 in Bingley, West Yorkshire. She attended Woodhouse Grove School in nearby Apperley Bridge before studying Drama and English at the University of Manchester. She was a co-founder of Lady Garden, a sketch comedy group formed in Manchester in 2005.

== Career ==
Knappett was the creator, writer, executive producer, and star of the E4 sitcom Drifters, in which she played Meg. She described the show as a semi-autobiographical and therapeutic re-writing of her own history.

Knappett played Lisa in The Inbetweeners Movie and appeared in the Alan Partridge film Alan Partridge: Alpha Papa and the TV film Irreversible. Other credits include Drunk History for Comedy Central, Mid Morning Matters with Alan Partridge for Sky One, Twenty Twelve for BBC Two, Meet the Parents for E4, and How Not to Live Your Life and Lunch Monkeys for BBC Three. She also played Carly in the BBC Radio 4 comedy series Shedtown alongside Johnny Vegas. She has recorded a string of pilot episodes, including Everything Happens for No Reason written by Richard Herring, alongside Noel Fielding. She co-wrote an episode of the AMC series Soulmates (TV series).

Knappett appearances on panel shows include 8 Out of 10 Cats, Hypothetical, Would I Lie to You? and The Last Leg. She has written for The Guardian. She was a contestant on the seventh season of Dave's comedy gameshow Taskmaster, falling off the stage during a task in one episode. She played the Vicar in the Channel 4 rom-com, Break Clause. Knappett has also written Push, a workplace sitcom centered on midwives ordered by BBC Comedy.

== Personal life ==
Knappett married Dan Crane in September 2016. They have two children and live in Ilkley, West Yorkshire.

== Filmography ==
Year	Title	Role	Notes
2026	Break Clause	Vicar	1 episode
2026	Wuthering Heights	Mrs. Burton	
2024	Would I Lie to You?	Herself	Series 17, Episode 8
2024	Celebrity Mastermind	Herself	Series 22, Episode 9
2023	Richard Osman's Festive House of Games	Herself	Series 7, Episodes 56–60
2022–2024	Avoidance	Claire	Series 1, Episodes 1–6, and Series 2, Episodes 1–6
2022	Dodger	The Countess	Series 1, Episode 10: "Revenge"
2022	The Weakest Link	Herself	Series 2, Episode 8: "New Year's Eve Special"
2022	Mel Giedroyc: Unforgivable	Herself	Series 2, Episode 8
2022	8 Out of 10 Cats Does Countdown	Herself	Series 22, Episode 4
2022	Meet the Richardsons	Herself	Series 3, Episode 4
2021	Meet the Richardsons	Herself	Series 2, Episode 3
2021	Question Team	Herself	Series 1, Episode 8
2021	Outsiders	Herself	Series 1, Episodes 1–6
2021	Rob Beckett's Undeniable	Herself	Series 1, Episodes 1–6
2021	Complaints Welcome	Herself	Series 1, Episodes 1–3
2021	Hypothetical	Herself	Series 3, Episode 2
2021	Paul Sinha's TV Showdown	Herself	Series 1, Episode 4
2021	Hitmen	Caroline	Series 2, Episode 2: "Sniper"
2021	Ghosts	Lucy	Series 3, Episodes 2, 4 & 6
2020	Richard Osman's House of Games	Herself	Series 4, Episodes 41–45
2020	Don't Hate the Playaz	Herself	Series 3, Episode 7
2020	8 Out of 10 Cats	Herself	Series 22, Episode 6
2020	Channel Hopping with Jon Richardson	Herself	Series 1, Episode 4
2020	Guessable	Herself	Series 1, Episode 2: "Alan and Lincoln's Wooden Teeth"
2020	Aunty Donna's Big Ol' House of Fun	English Lady at Bar	Series 1, Episode 5: "Night-Time!"
2019	Zone of Champions	Nicky Brimble	Series 1, Episodes 1–6
2019	Judge Romesh	Court Clerk	Series 2, Episodes 1–12
2019	Hypothetical	Herself	Series 1, Episode 1
2019	The Russell Howard Hour	Herself	Series 2, Episode 8
2019	Dave Gorman: Terms and Conditions Apply	Herself	Series 1, Episode: "Udder Fudge"
2019	The Inbetweeners: Fwends Reunited	Herself	Television Special
2019	The Last Leg	Herself	Series 18, Episode 8
2018	The Last Leg	Herself	Series 16, Episode 11: "The Last Leg of the Year 2018"
2018	Taskmaster	Herself	Series 7, Episodes 1–10
2018	Travel Man	Herself	Series 7, Episode 2: "48 Hours in Ibiza"
2018	Sunday Brunch	Herself	Series 7, Episode 30
2018	8 Out of 10 Cats Does Countdown	Herself	Series 15, Episode 1, and Series 16, Episode 6
2018	Go 8 Bit	Herself	Series 3, Episode 3
2017	Alan Davies: As Yet Untitled	Herself	Series 5, Episode 4: "Frank Bruno Was the Original Bus Driver"
2017	Halloween Comedy Shorts	Kelly	Series 2, Episode 3: "It Should Have Been Me"
2017	Drunk History: UK	Drunken Storyteller	Series 3, Episode 2: "Billy the Kid / Elizabeth I"
2017	The Educatoror	Charlotte Baines	Mini-series, Episodes 1–3
2017	8 Out of 10 Cats	Herself	Series 20, Episodes 3 & 5
2016	8 Out of 10 Cats	Herself	Series 19, Episode 4
2016	Celebrity Advice Bureau	Herself	Mini-series, Episodes 1–3
2016	My Worst Job	Herself	Mini-series, Episodes 1 & 2
2016	Drunk History: UK	Drunken Storyteller	Series 2, Episode 4: "Richard III / Mary Shelley's Frankenstein"
2016	Mid Morning Matters with Alan Partridge	Caller (voice)	Series 2, Episode 6: "Grundy + Snow"
2015	Drunk History: UK	Florence Nightingale	Series 1, Episode 8: "Baden Powell / Florence Nightingale / Worst Zoo Ever"
2014	Irreversible	Sarah	Television film
2014	Daily Brunch with Ocado	Herself – Guest	Series 1, Episode 21
2013–2016	Drifters	Meg	Series 1–4, 24 episodes. Main role and creator
2013	Alan Partridge: Alpha Papa	WPC Ruth	Film
2012	Comedy Showcase	PC Kelly Mink	Series 3, Episode 6: "The Function Room"
2012	Twenty Twelve	Carey Taylor	Series 2, Episode 6: "Inclusivity Day"
2012	Live at the Electric	Addition cast (segment 'The Van')	Series 1, Episodes 1–4
2011	The Inbetweeners Movie	Lisa	Film
2011	Dick and Dom's Funny Business	Herself – Guest	Series 1, Episode 2: "The Rider with Gordon Kennedy"
2011	Coming of Age	Alice	Series 3, Episode 8: "Fear Itself"
2011	Lunch Monkeys	Becky	Series 2, Episode 4: "Dream a Little Dream"
2011	Meet the Parents	Sister / Russian Cleaner	Series 1, Episodes 1–5
2010	How Not to Live Your Life	Harriet	Series 3, Episode 3: "Don's Posh Weekend"
