= Lucy Pearman =

British comedian and actor

Lucy Pearman is a British comedian, actress, and writer. She was nominated for Best Newcomer in the Edinburgh Comedy Awards at the Edinburgh Fringe in 2017 for her solo show. In July 2021 she wrote and starred in the BBC Three sitcom pilot Please Help, which was nominated for a BAFTA in 2022. In 2025 her new show Lunartic was nominated for Best Cabaret & Variety show at the Leicester Comedy Awards.

Lunartic was also nominated in the 2025 Malcolm Hardee Awards for ‘Comic Originality’

== Stand up ==
Pearman performed her first solo Edinburgh Fringe show in 2016. In 2017, she was nominated for Best Newcomer in the Edinburgh Comedy Awards and in 2019 she was nominated for Best Show at the Leicester Comedy Festival Awards.

In 2018, The Scotsman described her show Fruit Loop as one of the most unusual comedy shows at the Edinburgh Fringe that year.

Her shows involve music, clowning, character comedy, surrealism, audience interaction, props, and puns.

== Television ==
She has acted on TV since 2009, appearing in The Mind of Herbert Clunkerdunk, Mister Winner and The Bill, has acted in several short films, as well as writing and producing the short film The Baby. In 2019 Pearman performed on Harry Hill's Clubnite on Channel 4. She also guest starred in the 2020 Red Dwarf special Red Dwarf: The Promised Land as Sister Peanut.

In May 2021 the BBC announced a pilot, Please Help, written by and starring Pearman, which aired in July 2021 on BBC Three. The show centres on Pearman's character Milly, a full-time carer who gains superpowers.

In 2022, Pearman appeared in series 2 of The Mind of Herbert Clunkerdunk on BBC 2, reprising her role as Bobby Kindle. In September 2022 she starred alongside Kiell Smith-Bynoe and Tim Key in online sitcom, The Train, which she also wrote. In December 2022 she performed on Live at the Moth Club on Dave channel.

In February 2024 Pearman appeared on 8 Out of 10 Cats Does Countdown, for episode 5 of series 25, as the Dictionary Corner guest. She was a writer on LOL: Last One Laughing UK in 2025.

== Radio and podcast ==
In 2018 she appeared on BBC Radio 4 in series 4 of Tim Key's Late Night Poetry Programme.

She has appeared in the podcast series Funny from the Fringe, Secret Artists with Annie McGrath, Birthday Girls House Party and Call Jonathan Pie with Tom Walker.

Pearman's favourite comedy includes Camping, Brian Gittins and The Royle Family.

== Live shows ==
- 2025 – Lunartic
- 2019 – Baggage
- 2018 – Fruit Loop
- 2017 – Maid of Cabbage
- 2016 – Crack in Progress
