= 8 Out of 10 Cats Does Countdown =

British comedy television panel show

- Also known as: Cats Does Countdown; Catsdown
- Genre: Comedy panel game
- Based on: Countdown (Des chiffres et des lettres); 8 Out of 10 Cats
- Presented by: Jimmy Carr
- Starring: Susie Dent; Rachel Riley; Sean Lock; Jon Richardson; Joe Wilkinson; Rob Beckett
- Voices of: John Pohlhammer
- Theme music composer: Alan Hawkshaw
- Country of origin: United Kingdom
- Original language: English
- No. of series: 30
- No. of episodes: 180 (Note: As of 30 January 2026; excluding 'Best Bits' specials.) (list of episodes)

Production
- Production locations: Granada Studios (2012); Dock10 studios (2013–present)
- Running time: 45–47 minutes (Note: Apart from the very first episode from 2 January 2012 and Election Special from 2017. Excluding ad breaks.)
- Production companies: ITV Studios (2012–2022); Lifted Entertainment (2022–); Zeppotron

Original release
- Network: Channel 4
- Release: 2 January 2012 – present

Related
- 8 Out of 10 Cats; Countdown

8 Out of 10 Cats Does Countdown is a British comedy panel show on Channel 4. The show follows the game of Countdown, but presented in a comedy panel show format seen on 8 Out of 10 Cats, with the show being a crossover of the two.

The show is hosted by 8 Out of 10 Cats host Jimmy Carr, with Rachel Riley and Susie Dent assuming their Countdown roles assisting with the game. During most of the run, the two teams had regular captains Jon Richardson and Sean Lock; after Lock's death in 2021, his team has been led by a rotating series of guest captains while Richardson continues to be a regular captain (except when scheduling conflicts prevent him from appearing). In 2025, Rob Beckett was announced as a team captain, with Judi Love joining as a regular returning guest.

== History ==
The formation of the crossover began as a series of specials, the first of which was broadcast on 2 January 2012, when Channel 4 orchestrated a special "mash-up night", merging two shows to form a special edition of the pair, as part of its 30th-anniversary celebrations. Amongst the programmes that were chosen to be merged for the evening of specials, production teams on Countdown and 8 Out of 10 Cats agreed to combine the two formats of their respective programmes – the crossover between the two formats meant that Countdown's arrangement of games would be interspersed with 8 Out of 10 Cats-style banter. As part of the merger, both Rachel Riley and Susie Dent assumed their roles from the programme, while Jimmy Carr took on the mantle of host, with both Sean Lock and Jon Richardson competing as contestants, and Joe Wilkinson joining Dent during the crossover's recording.

Following the first special, Channel 4 ordered another crossover special for 24 August 2012 as part of Channel 4's "Funny Fortnight", featuring the same cast as before, along with the appearances of David O'Doherty and former Countdown contestant Clarke Carlisle. In April 2013, a further two specials were ordered by the network, expanding on the merged formats but featuring the same cast, albeit with Lock unable to attend due to ill health and leading to Lee Mack standing in for him. As part of the expanded format, both Mack and Richardson were joined by an additional contestant each, for each special – Rhod Gilbert, Rob Beckett, Stephen Mangan and Richard Osman – with Dent joined by Tim Key and Henning Wehn respectively during recordings.

On 9 July 2013, owing to favourable ratings from the specials, Channel 4 announced its decision to commission a full series of six episodes of the crossover, which was aired from July to September. Following the first series, the network ordered additional series for 2014, 2015, 2016, and 2017.

On 13 July 2018, Channel 4 aired a special edition of the crossover series as part of commemorations towards 100 years of women's suffrage in the United Kingdom. As part of the special, all male members of the cast and crew were replaced, leaving the episode to feature an all-female cast – Katherine Ryan acted as host, while Roisin Conaty, Sara Pascoe, Jessica Hynes and Lolly Adefope participated as the contestants, with an appearance by Morgana Robinson as Natalie Cassidy.

On 11 February 2022, Channel 4 aired the last episode that Sean Lock recorded before his death.

From the show's 29th series, Rob Beckett and Judi Love will become regular panellists alongside Jon Richardson and Joe Wilkinson.

== Format ==
Each episode lasts one hour, including advertising breaks, although the January 2012 special lasted only 30 minutes. Since the first one-third of the programme is occupied in introducing the panel, and due to the comedy interspersed between and during rounds, the game does not consist of the standard 15 rounds. Carr asks each panellist if they have a 'mascot', and the panellist will then indulge in some prop comedy, usually showing off a ludicrous or impractical object and telling a humorous story. The first few specials had different numbers of rounds ranging from 7 to 10. In the first two full series of the show, there were either 8 or 9 rounds. The first three quarters of the show each contained a letters round and a numbers round; the last section had a letters round, a numbers round (if there was time) and a conundrum. More recent series featured rounds involving two contestants participating in humorous activities (usually for bonus points), such as being blindfolded and identifying props that were spelt with nine letters.

The letters and numbers rounds are the same as in Countdown, and there are also "Teatime Teasers". The conundrums and teatime teasers typically contain sexual words or innuendos but with usually innocent answers, such as "GONADTIP" (clue: "One way to become a parent", answer: "ADOPTING").

Whilst the clock is ticking, as the contestants attempt to find a word within 30 seconds, Carr often takes part in some form of unusual or non-sequitur activity such as trying to get a dog through an obstacle course, stacking a house of cards or enticing a bird of prey to fly onto his arm. Riley and occasionally Dent sometimes participate in these segments. These segments take place mostly, though not exclusively, in letters rounds.

Apart from during the first two specials, there are two contestants on each team, with Richardson and Lock as permanent guests through the episodes. After Lock's death in 2021, his place has been taken by varying guests. During some rounds, contestants all offer an answer, but only the best answer from each team counts. During some rounds, one player per team is nominated to answer.

A celebrity appears in Dictionary Corner, and, after each numbers round, they present a poem, song or another comedic segment. Susie Dent's "Origin of Words" section does not appear but is instead replaced with an additional segment from the guest.

In earlier episodes, Joe Wilkinson appeared as Riley's assistant in the second half of the show, often dressed in costume whilst using props. The humour continued throughout the series, such as Wilkinson offering special prizes, replacing letter tiles with symbols, or turning up despite having been "fired".

The teams compete for a different low-value prize each edition, such as "The Countdown Paddling Pool" or "The Countdown Picnic Hamper", parodying the teapot and dictionary prizes given in the real Countdown. These prizes are brought on by muscular men wearing black swimming trunks, one of whom is described as "Joe Wilkinson's idiot half-brother Fabio", played by Robert Deaton.

== Episodes ==
Series	Episodes	Originally released		Ave. UK viewers (millions) (Note: The series averages exclude 'Best Bits' compilation specials.)
Series	Episodes	First released	Last released	Ave. UK viewers (millions)
Original	2	2 January 2012	24 August 2012	2.48
1	2	12 April 2013	19 April 2013	2.44
2	5 (+1)	26 July 2013	20 September 2013	2.42
3	6	3 January 2014	28 February 2014	2.71
4	7	6 June 2014	18 July 2014	2.03
5	3	5 September 2014	19 September 2014	2.39
6	6 (+1)	29 December 2014	13 February 2015	2.43
7	17	8 May 2015	4 September 2015	1.95
8	4 (+1)	8 December 2015	5 February 2016	2.04
9	5	25 February 2016	31 March 2016	1.90
10	5	5 August 2016	2 September 2016	1.73
11	7	24 September 2016	5 November 2016	1.51
12	8 (+2)	24 December 2016	1 May 2017	1.68
13	3 (+1)	8 June 2017	6 July 2017	1.17
14	5	18 August 2017	22 September 2017	1.54
15	4 (+1)	29 December 2017	9 February 2018	2.06
16	8	13 July 2018	31 August 2018	1.51
17	6 (+1)	23 December 2018	15 February 2019	1.76
18	7	26 July 2019	6 September 2019	1.67
19	6 (+1)	23 December 2019	14 February 2020	1.36
20	3 (+2 ‘BB’)	31 July 2020	14 August 2020	1.37
21	6 (+1)	21 December 2020	18 February 2021	ca. 1.73
22	6 (+1)	24 December 2021	11 February 2022	1.55
23	6	29 July 2022	2 September 2022	ca. 1.05
24	2 (+1 +2 ‘BB’)	23 December 2022	11 August 2023	N/A
25	5 (+1)	21 December 2023	9 February 2024	ca. 1.02
26	5	19 July 2024	16 August 2024	0.75
27	5 (+1 ‘BB’)	3 January 2025	31 January 2025	0.96
28	5 (+3 ‘BB’)	25 July 2025	25 September 2025	0.94
29	3 (+1)	24 December 2025	30 January 2026	0.96
30	2	31 July 2026	7 August 2026	0.70

== International broadcasts ==
In Australia, the show has aired on SBS 2 since 7 August 2018 from the beginning, as well as on SBS. Later series have also aired on the pay TV channel BBC UKTV since 23 October 2018. In New Zealand, the show has also been very popular, screening on two free-to-air TVNZ channels—TVNZ 2 and TVNZ Duke, as well as BBC UKTV on pay TV provider Sky Television. In the United States and Canada, certain series of the programme are available on BritBox and Amazon Prime Video.

== Reception ==
=== Ratings ===
The first mashup was watched by 2.49 million viewers, making it the second-most-watched Channel 4 show that week. The next episode, part of "Funny Fortnight", received 1.76 million viewers, which was an 8.3% audience share. The 2014 Christmas special was watched by 1.75 million viewers, a 7.6% audience share.

=== Awards ===
In 2014, 8 Out of 10 Cats Does Countdown was nominated for the British Comedy Awards in two categories: Best Comedy Panel Programme and Best Comedy Moment of 2014. Sean Lock was also nominated for Best Male Television Comic, and Joe Wilkinson was nominated for Best Comedy Breakthrough Artist.
