= George Lamb =

English radio and television presenter

- Born: George Martin Lamb; 20 December 1979 (age 46); Hammersmith, West London, England
- Education: St Christopher School, Letchworth Garden City
- Occupations: Broadcaster; farmer; businessman
- Years active: 2007–2012; 2015–2018
- Parent: Larry Lamb (father)

George Martin Lamb (born 20 December 1979) is an English former radio and television presenter, farmer and businessman. In 2012, he presented the Channel 4 game show The Bank Job. He is the son of actor Larry Lamb.

== Education ==
Born in Hammersmith, West London, Lamb was educated at St Christopher School, a boarding independent school in Letchworth Garden City, Hertfordshire.

== Career ==
=== Radio ===
Lamb's career peaked with presenting an eponymous daytime BBC Radio 6 Music show, for two years from October 2007 to November 2009. He then moved to early weekend mornings for six months before leaving 6 Music in May 2010. His show mixed shock jock banter with his Ministry of Sound DJ co-host, Marc Hughes.

Lamb's last-known radio work was a 2010 Starbucks-sponsored Spotify slot and a brief stint at TalkSport.

=== Television ===
Lamb's television career started in 2007 when he replaced Alex Zane as the host of the second series of BBC reality show Celebrity Scissorhands and returned in 2008 for the third series. He has also presented The Restaurant, Road To V and Young Butcher of the Year, as parodied on Harry Hill's TV Burp, and also parodied by Ray Peacock and Ed Gamble on The Peacock and Gamble Podcast.

Lamb was the presenter of Big Brother's Little Brother (or BBLB) from mid-2008, taking over from Dermot O'Leary who had presented BBLB since 2001. He first presented the show with co-host Zezi Ifore, though she was sacked halfway through the series, leaving Lamb the sole presenter. For the final series of BBLB in 2010, Emma Willis joined Lamb as co-presenter. Willis moved with Big Brother to Channel 5 when the rights were bought from Channel 4, however Lamb did not.

In Jul 2009, Lamb presented a programme on BBC Three exploring the world of legal party pills and herbal highs.

On 19 February 2010, he presented EastEnders Live: The Aftermath alongside Kirsten O'Brien, interviewing the cast and production team after the first live episode of EastEnders.

He took part in a reality TV show on ITV2 called The Parent Trip with his father, actor Larry Lamb, in which they visited the Himba people in Namibia. On 31 March 2011, he appeared in an episode of Celebrity Juice with his dad. In 2017, the pair presented Channel 5's Britain by Bike with Larry & George Lamb.

Lamb also took part in Channel 4's game show The Million Pound Drop Live on 29 October 2010, alongside his father, Larry Lamb. They survived the final question with £50,000 for the charity Plan. In 2012, Lamb presented the Channel 4 game show The Bank Job.

In 2017, George presented In Solitary: The Anti-Social Experiment, a Channel 5 entertainment show that involves three members of the public being locked up in solitary confinement for 5 days. George hosts and also participates. In 2018, Lamb returned to present Celebs In Solitary, in which Anthea Turner, Professor Green, Eddie Hall, and Shazia Mirza attempt to spend five days in solitary confinement.

== Personal life ==
Lamb was born in West London to an English father, actor Larry Lamb, and a Scottish mother, Linda Martin from Dundee and grew up in Fulham. He has three sisters; Vanessa Clare Lamb born in 1969, Eloise Alexandra Lamb, born in 1998, and Eva-Mathilde Lamb, born in 2003. He supports Dundee United and Fulham. Lamb is also known for his trademark grey hair.

In March 2010, he supported Global Cool by going on a flight-free holiday to Barcelona with his friend and fellow TV presenter Rick Edwards.

In 2019, Lamb and Andy Cato founded Wildfarmed, a network of farmers who practice regenerative agriculture. The pair met in Ibiza in 2013, when Lamb took a break from his media career after becoming disillusioned with it. In this role, Lamb and Cato made a guest appearance on the third series of Amazon Prime Video's Clarkson's Farm.

== BBC 6 Music controversies ==
Lamb's former 6 Music show proved controversial, being atypical of 6 Music – for example, its shock jock style encroached upon youth-oriented BBC Radio 1's daytime public service remit. It marked a significant diversion from 6 Music's principally novel, trans-era eclectic-musicologistic origins and tradition. This gambit proved controversial, driving an attrition of 6 Music's long -time listeners and provoking rival petitioning websites: getlambout.org.uk and keeplambin.co.uk. Similarly, national media reviews were polarised. Radio veteran Paul Gambaccini said Lamb's interview with Ray Davies of The Kinks was the "worst interview in the history of broadcasting".

In May 2008, Lamb was reprimanded for pledging his support on air for Boris Johnson in the London mayoral race. In 2014, he criticised the BBC, claiming "You can't have opinions at the Beeb".
