= The ParaPod =

Comedy podcast and film

- Genre: Comedy

Cast and voices
- Hosted by: Ian Boldsworth and Barry Dodds

Publication
- No. of episodes: 44 (including extras and specials)
- Original release: 4 September 2015 – 9 August 2018

Related
- Website: www.theparapod.com

The ParaPod was a comedy podcast hosted by comedians Ian Boldsworth and Barry Dodds. Its subject matter is the paranormal, with skepticism represented by Boldsworth and belief represented by Dodds.

The podcast ran for three series (ghosts, mysteries, conspiracies) and three specials between 2015 and 2018. In March 2018 a teaser was released for an upcoming Parapod Movie, a month later a full trailer was released and consistent updates on the films status have been provided since.

The three series consists of 30 episodes and, as of April 2018, it has been downloaded over 2 million times.

Episodes usually follow the structure of "intro" (paranormal- and podcast-related news), "featured haunting" (the main subject matter of the episode which Ian commonly refers to as a 'fairy story'); "The BD Files" (listener correspondence); and "rituals" (ways to allegedly summon a ghost). Some episodes have also featured pre-recorded or live telephone interviews and a 2016 special took the form of an outside broadcast at a purportedly haunted house in Pontefract, Yorkshire.

Each episode begins with a warning in the style of a legal disclaimer not to enact any of the rituals or instructions described in the show.

== Awards and recognition ==
The ParaPod was nominated for Chortle Awards in 2016 and 2017, and an Ockham Award for Skeptical Excellence in 2017. It won Best Online Comedy at the Midlands Comedy Awards in 2016 and was selected as a cultural highlight of 2016 by Sofie Hagen in The Guardian

== Episodes ==
Series One 4 Sep - 19 Dec 2015
#	Featured Haunting
1	30 East Drive, Pontefract
2	Chillingham Castle
3	The Death of Elisa Lam
4	The Enfield Poltergeist
5	Doris Bither
6	Hampton Court Palace
7	Beamish Hall
8	Borley Rectory
9	Pluckley Village (Barry's Taxi anthology episode)
10	The Schooner Hotel
Special	Live from 30 East Drive, Pontefract: Part 1
Special	Live from 30 East Drive, Pontefract: Part 2

Series Two: The ParaPod Mysteries 9 February - 30 October 2016
#	Mystery of the Week
1	The Loch Ness Monster
2	The Crying Boy
3	El Chupacabra
4	Slender Man
5	Curse of The Babadook
6	Poveglia Island and The Pollock Twins
7	Rendlesham Forest Incident
8	Spontaneous Human Combustion
9	Mystery Tour (Barry's Taxi anthology episode)
10	Bigfoot
Special	The Unspecial Special

Series Three: The ParaPod Conspiracies 17 January - 28 March 2017
#	Conspiracy of the Week
1	The Moon Landings
2	The Illuminati
3	Paul McCartney
4	Chemtrails
5	Dulce Base
6	The Highgate Vampire
7	Flat Earth
8	Assassination of John F. Kennedy
9	Conspiracy Coach (Barry's Taxi anthology episode)
10	The Mandela Effect
Live	Gef the Talking Mongoose
Special	Robert the Doll

In addition to these main episodes and specials, there are ten short "Parapod Extras" that ran largely through the first season between main episodes. In these extras, Barry demonstrates to Ian a piece of his ghost seeking equipment.

== The ParaPod Movie ==
The Parapod movie had its world premiere on 7 January 2020 at Prince Charles Cinema in London's Soho. The film was financed through crowdfunding and funding from film maker Bil Bungay, producer of the supernatural horror film When the Lights Went Out. The film is directed by Boldsworth with music by Thomas Van Der Ree and follows the basic premise of the podcast. The film was scheduled to tour independent cinemas in the spring of 2020 with question and answers with cast and crew after each showing but was postponed after only a handful of performances due to COVID-19 pandemic restrictions. The movie is the first to be transferred from podcast to full-length feature film and is accompanied by a new series of the podcast to accompany the movie without spoilers. The movie was completed in 2019, runs for 108 minutes and is rated 15.

== Gallery ==
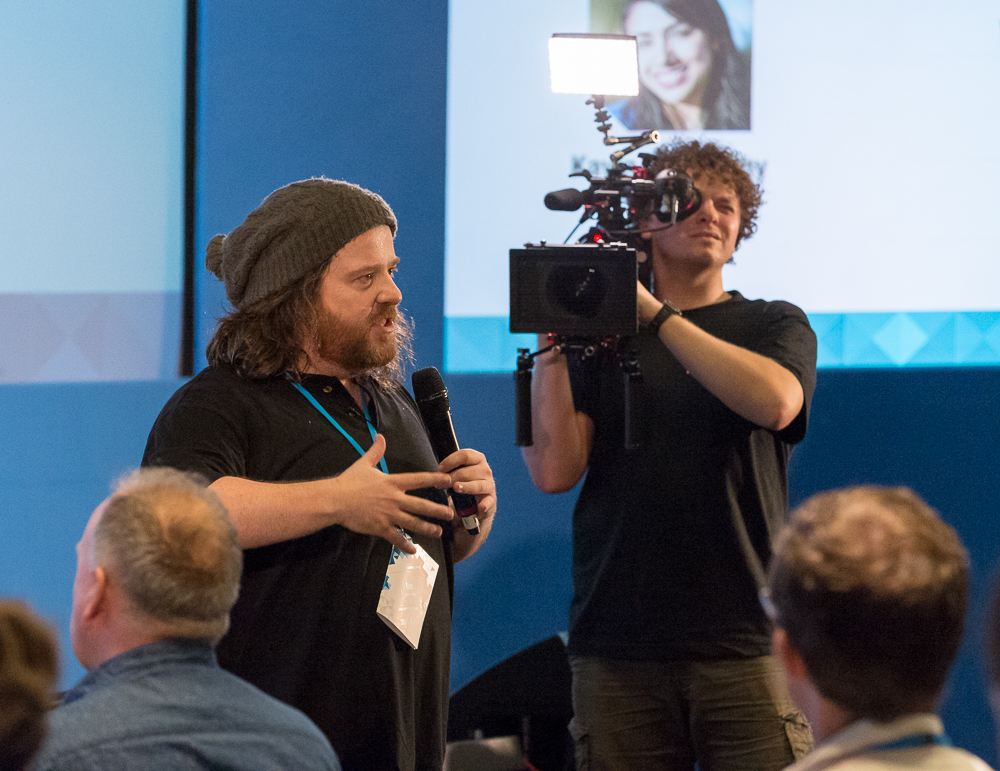
Ian Boldsworth introducing the ParaPod at QEDcon 2017

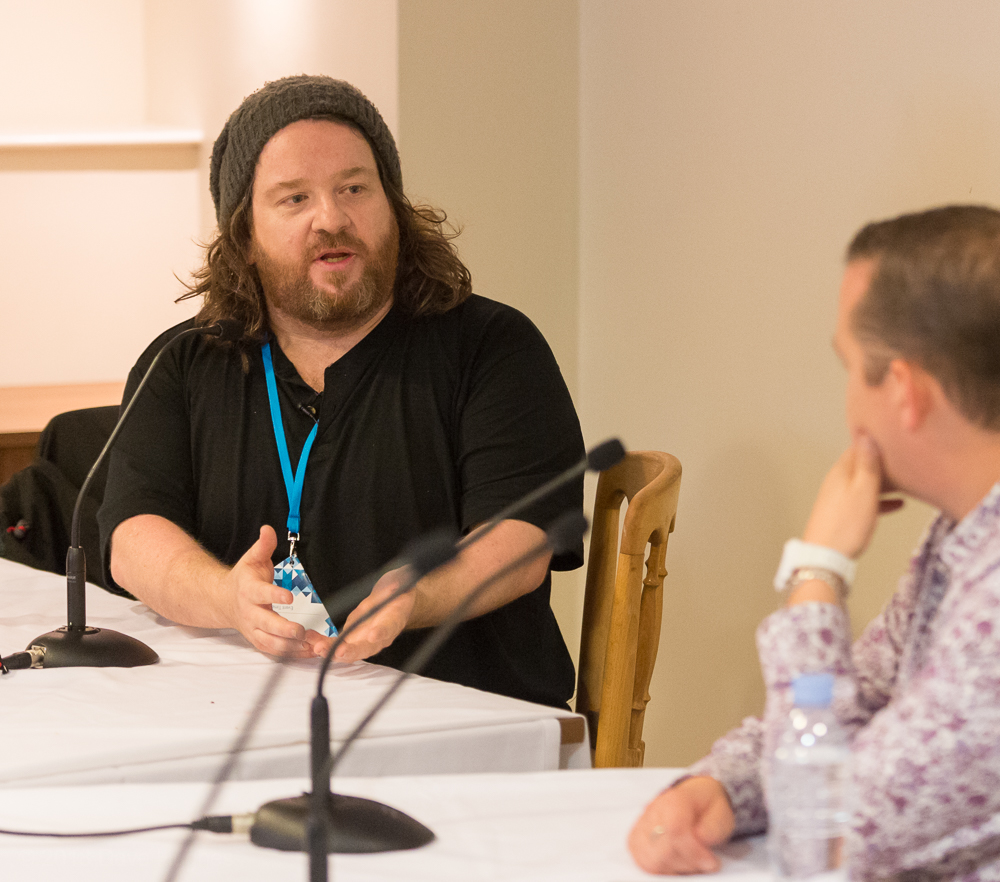
Ian Boldsworth (L) with co-host Barry Dodds (R) at QEDcon 2017
