= Palazzo Zaguri =

Historic Palace of Venice

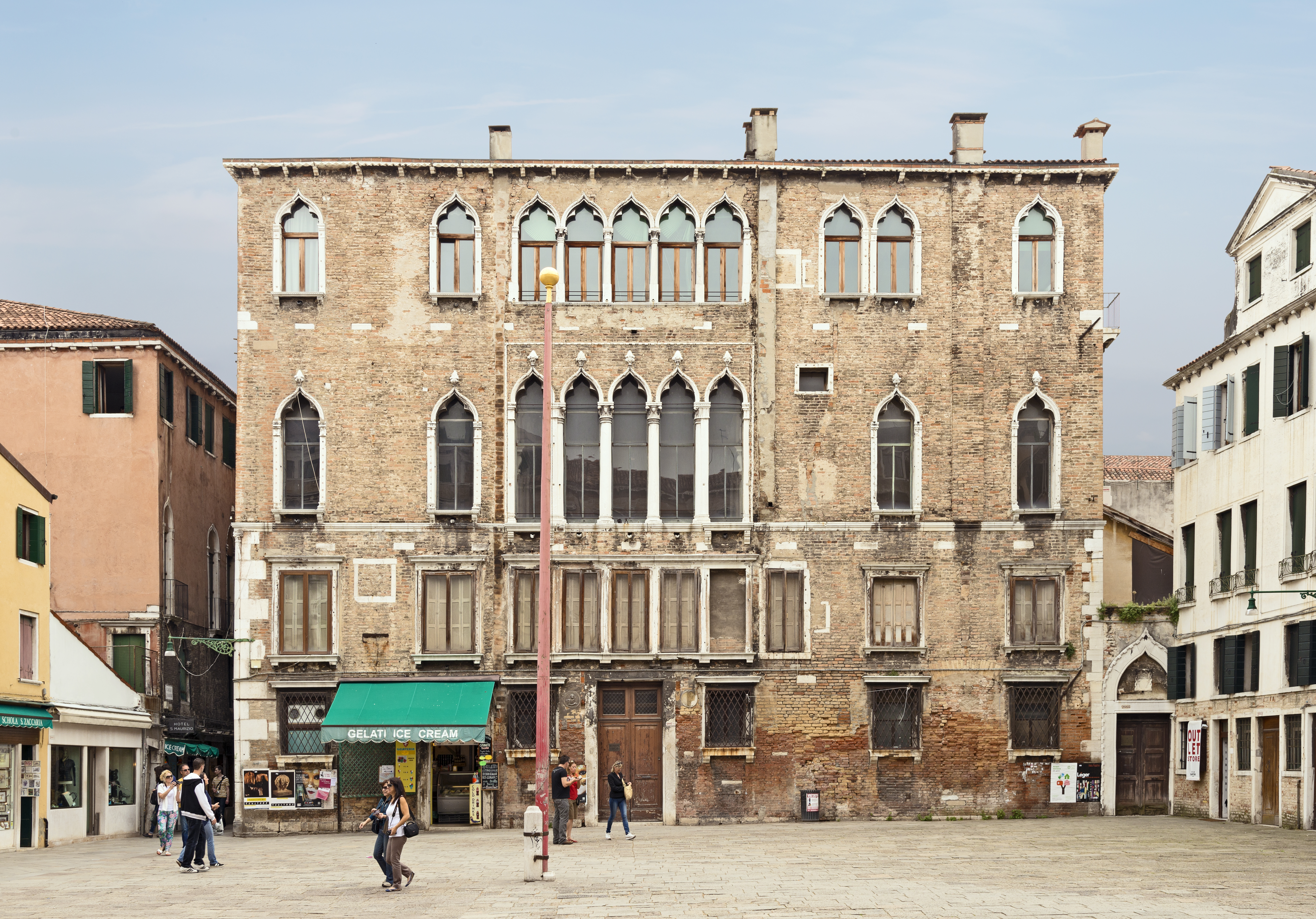
- The facade facing Campo San Maurizio
- Interactive map of the Palazzo Zaguri area

General information
- Architectural style: Gothic
- Location: Venice, Veneto, San Marco 2668 and 2631 – Campo San Maurizio and Fondamenta Corner Zaguri, Italy
- Current tenants: Private property – exhibitions and hospitality activities
- Construction started: 14th century

Technical details
- Floor count: 4

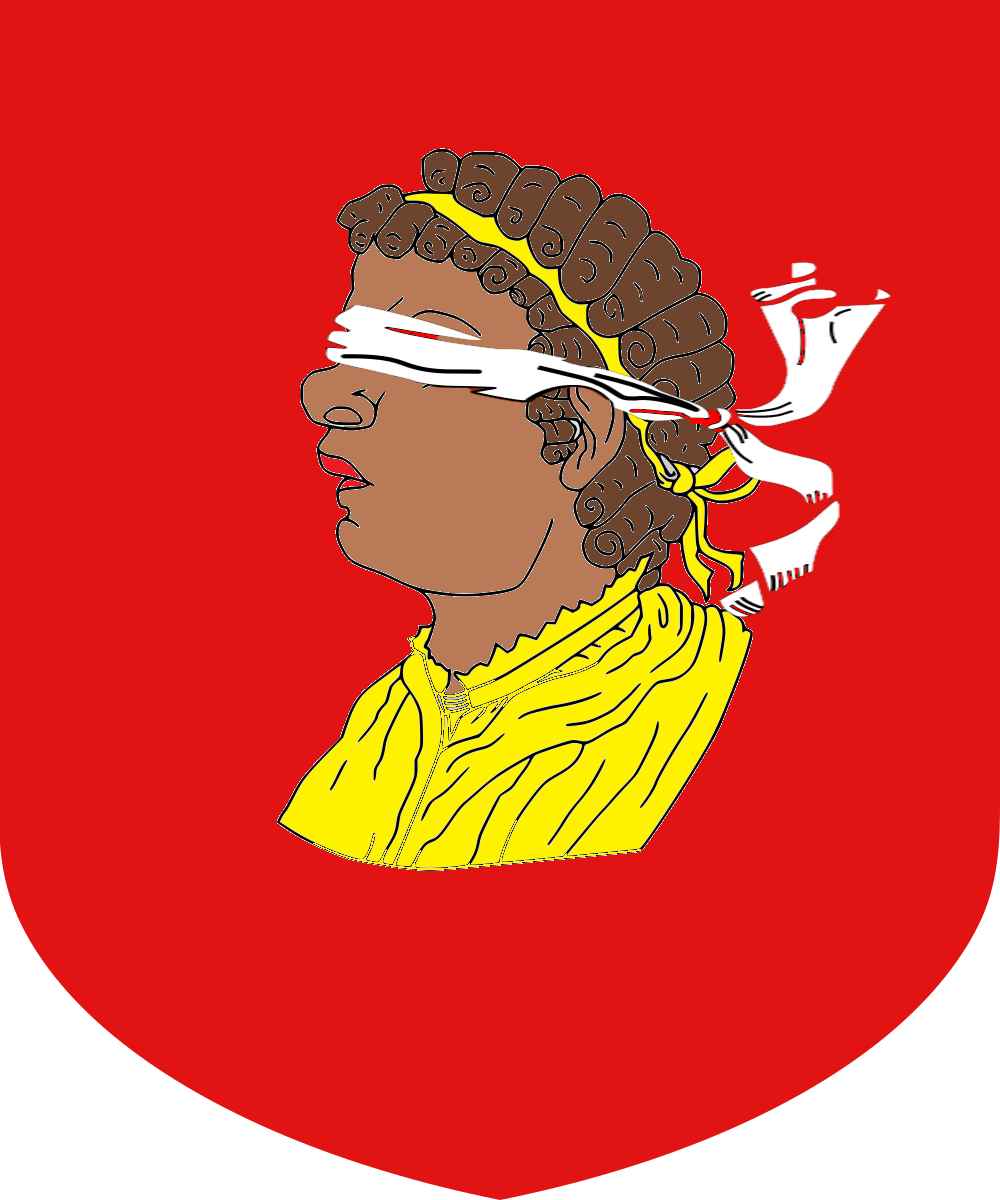
Coat of arms of the Zaguri family

Palazzo Zaguri, formerly known as Palazzo Pasqualini, is a Venetian palace built in the 14th century, located in Campo San Maurizio, within the San Marco district of Venice, Italy. The building encloses the eastern side of the square and gives its name to the adjacent bridge connecting the area of San Maurizio with that of Santa Maria del Giglio.

== History ==
The palace was constructed between the 14th and 15th century by the Pasqualini family, wealthy merchants originally from Milan, who amassed great wealth through the silk trade. The coat of arms still visible on the palace façade, bearing the letter "P" with three horizontal bars, confirms the family's connection. Another family symbol can be found on the well curb in the internal courtyard.

The Pasqualini, known patrons of the arts, commissioned many works from prominent Venetian artists of the 15th century, eventually forming an important art collection displayed within the palace. The collection included works attributed to Gentile da Fabriano, paintings from the workshop of Titian, and two portraits painted by Antonello da Messina in 1475: one of the wealthy jeweler Michele Vianello and another of Alvise Pasqualini, a family member.

The 16th-century art historian Marcantonio Michiel praised the Pasqualini collection, describing paintings such as a *Last Supper* by Titian's workshop, partially executed by Giorgione, and a half-figure Madonna by Giovanni Bellini. He also documented works by Gentile da Fabriano and more portraits by Antonello da Messina.

In 1496, the palace hosted the Montenegrin prince Đurađ Crnojević and his wife, daughter of Antonio Erizzo, following their escape from their homeland after a Turkish invasion. The prince was later welcomed into the Venetian nobility.

The Pasqualini family owned the palace until 1521, when Antonio Pasqualini sold it for 5,400 ducats to Alvise Priuli. In 1565, Giacomo Priuli sold part of the building to the jurist Vincenzo Pellegrini, whose sister Marina had previously married Girolamo Zaguri. Eventually, the entire building came into the possession of the Zaguri family by 1740.

The Zaguri family, originally known as "Saraceni" and hailing from Kotor, relocated to Venice at the end of the 15th century. They were granted Venetian citizenship in 1504 and ennobled in 1646. In the early 19th century, Pietro Antonio Zaguri funded the reconstruction of the nearby Church of San Maurizio. The family line ended in 1810 with the death of Pietro II Marco Zaguri, after which the palace passed to the Braganza family and later, in the 20th century, to the City of Venice. It was sold again in 2007 and is currently under private ownership.

Archaeological works recently uncovered the remains of a historic well, previously documented in 16th-century maps.

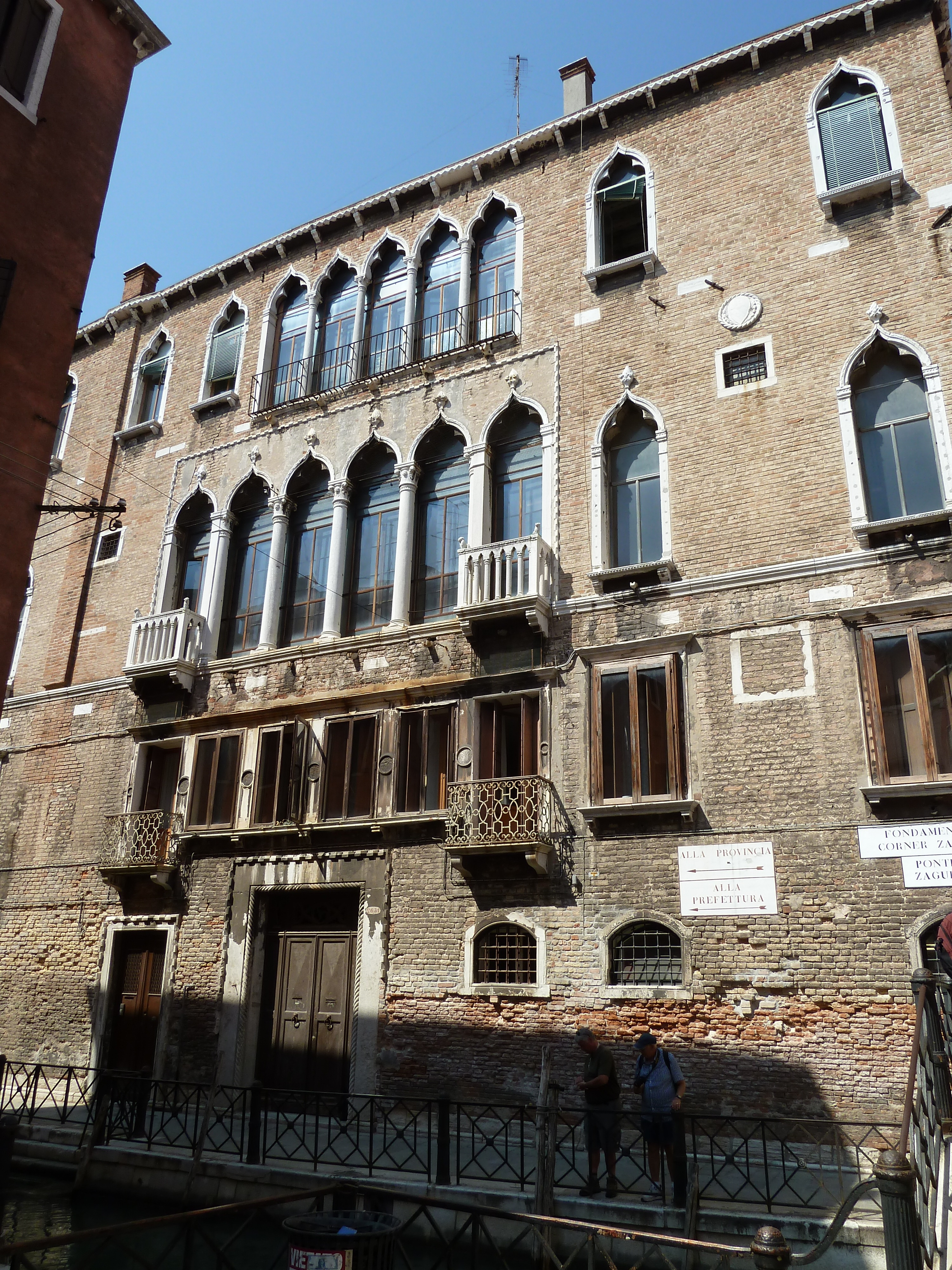
Rear façade of the palace

== Architecture ==
Palazzo Zaguri is notable for having two main façades of almost equal prominence, both built in Gothic style:

- Front façade: Overlooking Campo San Maurizio, it features two polifore (multi-light windows). The lower one, more ornate, consists of five openings flanked by several single-light windows. A pointed arch portal is visible on the far right. The palace faces Palazzo Molin and Palazzo Bellavite.
- Rear façade: Overlooking Fondamenta Corner Zaguri, it shows the remnants of a cavana (a boat entrance), indicating that the pedestrian path was a later addition. The grand quadrifora (four-light window) on the main floor is flanked by single-light windows, forming a faux hexafora. The ensemble is decorated with a checkerboard frieze and Gothic capitals.

== See also ==
- Gothic architecture

== Bibliography ==
- Brusegan, Marcello (2007). I Palazzi di Venezia. Newton & Compton, Rome. ISBN 978-88-541-0820-2.
- Tassini, Giuseppe (1970). Curiosità veneziane. Filippi Editore, Venice.
- Zanotto, Francesco (1856). Nuovissima guida di Venezia e delle isole della sua laguna. Brizeghel Editore, Venice.
