= Off Menu with Ed Gamble and James Acaster =

British comedic culinary podcast

- Genre: Comedy, food, interview
- Language: English

Cast and voices
- Hosted by: Ed Gamble, James Acaster

Production
- Length: 45–120 minutes

Publication
- No. of episodes: 326
- Original release: 5 December 2018-Present

Related
- Website: www.offmenupodcast.co.uk

Off Menu with Ed Gamble and James Acaster is a food and comedy podcast featuring Ed Gamble and James Acaster, in which guests are invited to select their dream menu by both comedians. Off Menu was launched in December 2018. As of April 2023, the podcast has been downloaded 120 million times.

== Premise ==
In the show, guests are asked by Acaster—in the role of a Genie Waiter—for their dream menu, in a dream restaurant that can produce any food and drink. Acaster first asks guests, "Still or sparkling water?" Shortly after, and without warning, Acaster will shout "Papadams or bread?" The episode continues with the guest giving their starter, main course, dessert, side dish and drink (not in that order). Cooking sound effects play between discussions of each course. Guests explain what they like about the food, memories associated with it and other food and drink topics, as well as discussing their body of work.

Before the guest arrives Gamble and Acaster announce a secret ingredient that at least one of them does not like, is suggested by a listener or is related to the guest. If the guest mentions the ingredient they are ejected from the Dream Restaurant without getting any dinner. The only guest ejected from the Dream Restaurant is Jayde Adams. The hosts refer to the producer, Ben Williams, as the Great Benito. The hosts have some strong established opinions on food: for instance, Gamble favours a cheeseboard for dessert, to which Acaster objects. They also have established anecdotes, such as Acaster's story about drinking Diet Coke after a long period of caffeine abstinence and believing that it tasted like Coca-Cola.

== Episodes ==
A wide range of guests have "eaten at the dream restaurant", including comedians, chefs, and other figures such as Bob Mortimer, Michelle Keegan, Ainsley Harriott and Joe Thomas. In the show's 100th, 200th, and 300th episodes, Acaster and Gamble chose their own dream menus. These special episodes were hosted by Claudia Winkleman, Rylan Clark, and AJ Odudu respectively.

On 12 March 2025, a secondary format was introduced called Tasting Menu, where a former guest returns to be "fed" the dream menu of another former guest. The first returning guest was John Kearns, being told the menu of Miriam Margoyles.

== Background ==
The podcast began in December 2018. It reached 50 million downloads in April 2021, and 120 million by April 2023.

Gamble had previously hosted The Peacock and Gamble Podcast, while Off Menu was Acaster's first hosting role on a podcast. Acaster has experience working in two kitchens, though he did not learn to cook in either role. As a format point, Acaster decided unilaterally that he was a genie.

== Live shows ==
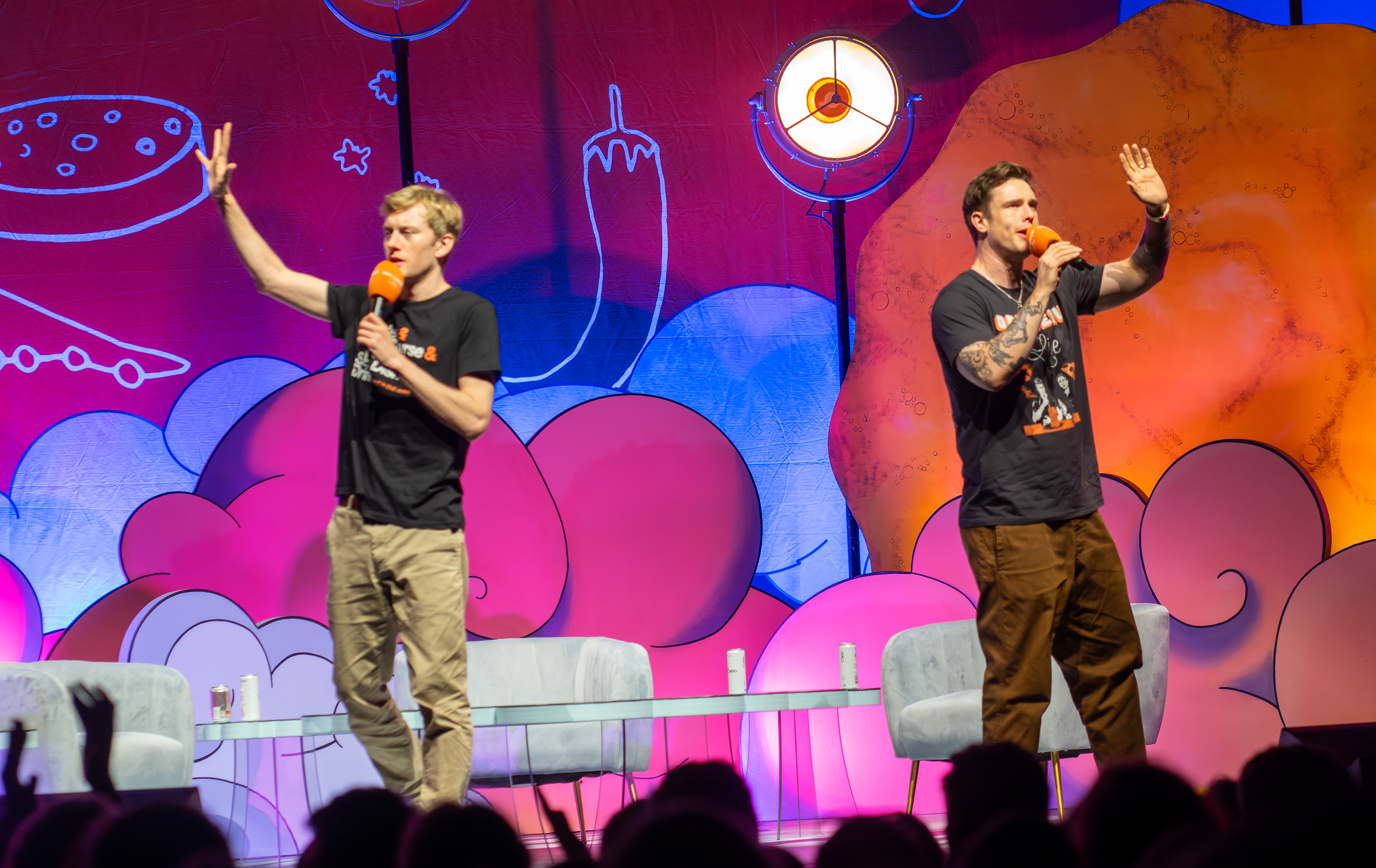
James Acaster (left) and Ed Gamble (right) performing a live show of Off Menu at the Royal Albert Hall in 2023

A live episode of Off Menu was recorded in July 2021 at the Royal Festival Hall with Isy Suttie and Edgar Wright as the guests. They returned to record a Christmas episode in 2022. Gamble and Acaster toured with 15 Off Menu live shows in October and November 2023. They returned to London for a short run at the London Palladium in March 2025 with a number of guests including Julian Clary and Self Esteem. In March 2026, they recorded live shows at the Royal Albert Hall, with Katherine Ryan and Nish Kumar being amongst their guests.

== Accolades ==
Off Menu was nominated for Best Comedy Podcast in the 2019 British Podcast Awards. In 2020, Off Menu garnered two nominations in the categories Best Comedy Podcast and Best Entertainment Podcast. It was nominated for two awards in 2022 in the Spotlight category—for large, mainstream podcasts—and the Best Live Podcast category. In 2023 it was nominated for the Spotlight Award, a category for podcasts with over 100,000 downloads per episode.

In 2022 and 2023 it received a nomination in the Best Comedy Podcast category at the National Comedy Awards.

It was nominated for Best Podcast at the 2022 Chortle Awards.

== Reception ==
In 2020, The Guardian critics ranked it the 17th-best podcast of the year.

In an early Irish Times review, Sarah Griffin praised the "succinct and unique" concept as a "particularly good ice-breaker" with "deliberate and considered" structure, and the hosts as "playful, curious and focused" with "genuine curiosity" in the guest.

The Times rated a 2023 live show three stars.

== See also ==
- List of food podcasts
