= Jay Shareef =

British comedian & broadcaster (born 1982)

- Born: 1982 (age 43–44)
- Other names: Jay Islaam, Bambam Shaikh, Rabbi Hyman Patel

Comedy career
- Years active: 2013–present
- Medium: Stand-up
- Genres: Observational humour, Character comedy, Satire
- Subjects: Autism, Political Correctness, Racism, Islam
- Website: jayshareef.com

Jay Shareef (born 1982) is a British stand-up comedian, broadcaster, podcaster and social commentator, also known by the stage name Jay Islaam.

Shareef has written for The Guardian, Huffington Post, Birmingham Mail, Chortle, Beyond The Joke and Gigglebeats. He presents weekly arts and culture shows on Radio Peterborough and Switch Radio, and has also appeared on BBC Radio London, BBC Radio Nottingham, BBC Radio WM and BBC Asian Network.

== Personal life ==
Shareef is from Birmingham, England, and lives in the Cambridgeshire city of Peterborough. He is of Pakistani descent. He previously worked as a marketing consultant, and started performing stand-up comedy when he visited the Edinburgh Festival Fringe in August 2013. He is teetotal and vegan.

== Career ==
Shareef is a Muslim of Punjabi heritage. He refuses to label himself as an "ethnic comedian", and has written about his objection to positive discrimination. He has described his comedy as "neither left-wing nor right-wing" and cites George Carlin, Omid Djalili and Bill Hicks as influences.

Shareef has been called "one of the bad boys of British comedy". He performs "political satire" that has been described as "cleverly controversial", "risqué" and "comedy genius". He has performed at The Glee Club and The Comedy Store.

In 2014, Shareef created the Midlands Comedy Awards "to recognise the huge number of hard working and talented people in [the] regional comedy community".

In August 2014, he was due to premiere his debut solo show, titled Racist Joke Show, about the evolution of political correctness and the rise of the far right. The show's publicity featured a golliwog on the poster. Due to the controversy the show generated, it was banned from being performed by its host venue at the Edinburgh Festival Fringe. He described the cancellation of his show as "a difficult and unhappy outcome" that was outside of his control and stated he was "very disappointed about the situation".

In February 2016, he performed a show at the Leicester Comedy Festival exploring the subject of Autism, titled Travels with Autism. This was his first full-length solo show, which was then performed at the Edinburgh Festival Fringe in August 2016 for a short run. The show, about his life and his struggle with Asperger syndrome, was described by one reviewer as a "raw and personal show" with "dry wit and intelligence".

In October 2016, Shareef was part of the Super Muslim Comedy Tour of standup comedy, along with Azhar Usman and Omar Regan, that visited twelve cities in England.

== Awards ==
As a new act Shareef won 20 comedy competitions. In July 2014, he won his first national award, within a year of starting his comedy career, when he beat more than 100 new comedians to be recognised as Breakthrough Act 2014. In 2015 he was a semi-finalist in the English Comedian of the Year competition, and runner-up for the Joker of the Year award.

In February 2016. it was reported that he had become a finalist in three different British comedy awards, and later that month he was given the New Act of the Year Award 2016 at Moseley Comedy Festival. In August 2016 he was one of three finalists for the Asian Arts Award for Comedy at the Edinburgh Festival Fringe for his show Travels with Autism. In October 2016, he was runner-up for the New Comedian of the Year Award at Colchester Comedy Festival.

In January 2017, he was chosen as one of five finalists for the "Best Midlands Comedian Award 2017" by What's on magazine, and was also a finalist for the Arts and Culture Award for the British Muslim Awards 2017.
