= Nottingham Festival =

Nottingham Festival may refer to:

- Nottingham Comedy Festival
- Nottingham Goose Fair
- Nottingham Pride
- Dot to Dot Festival, a music festival
