= It's Personal with Amy Hoggart =

- Genre: Comedy
- Created by: Amy Hoggart
- Presented by: Amy Hoggart
- Country of origin: United States
- Original language: English
- No. of seasons: 1
- No. of episodes: 8

Production
- Executive producers: Samantha Bee; Jason Jones; Leo Allen; Tony Hernandez; Brooke Posch
- Running time: 22 minutes
- Production companies: Randy & Pam's Quality Entertainment; Jax Media

Original release
- Network: TruTV
- Release: February 26 – April 22, 2020

It's Personal with Amy Hoggart is an American comedy television series starring Amy Hoggart. The series premiered on TruTV on February 26, 2020.

== Episodes ==
No.	Title	Original release date	US viewers (millions)
1	"Humor"	February 26, 2020	0.690
2	"Miami"	March 4, 2020	0.177
3	"Anxiety"	March 11, 2020	0.131
4	"Monogamy"	March 25, 2020	0.115
5	"Friendship"	April 1, 2020	0.103
6	"Revenge"	April 8, 2020	0.139
7	"Shame"	April 15, 2020	N/A
8	"Grief"	April 22, 2020	0.089
