= Almost Royal =

British-American television series

- Genre: Comedy
- Written by: Ed Gamble; Jason Hazeley; Amy Hoggart; Samantha Martin; Joel Morris; Seamus Murphy-Mitchell; Tom Neenan; Piers Torday
- Directed by: Chris Faith/Marcus Liversedge
- Starring: Ed Gamble, Amy Hoggart
- Narrated by: Gemma Whelan
- Country of origin: United Kingdom
- Original language: English
- No. of seasons: 2

Production
- Executive producer: Clive Tulloh
- Producer: Seamus Murphy-Mitchell

Original release
- Network: BBC America
- Release: June 21, 2014 – February 8, 2016

Almost Royal is a British-American faux-reality television comedy series on the BBC America network. It is their first original first-run comedy series. It follows the lives of two clueless British aristocrat siblings—Georgie and Poppy Carlton—visiting the United States for the first time. The series stars Ed Gamble and Amy Hoggart as Georgie and Poppy, respectively. It is produced by Burning Bright Productions and premiered on June 21, 2014. Although Georgie and Poppy are both portrayed by actors, the Americans with whom they interact are not aware of this. On December 4, 2014, the show was renewed for an eight-episode second season, which started airing on January 18, 2016.

== Plot ==
The series begins after Georgie and Poppy's father suffers a fatal accident. His dying wish was for his children to travel to the United States, a country he loved. Thus, Georgie and Poppy travel across the Atlantic, first to Los Angeles, then to Boston, and other well-known American cities. Georgie hopes to become more manly from learning about the United States, while Poppy hopes to procure a job that does not require very much work, such as acting. Georgie and Poppy often try out new things they deem "American" such as shooting guns, meeting a barista, making a Twitter account, and working at a car repair shop. Usually, Poppy takes the spotlight even in areas she is bad at, and Georgie compliments Poppy no matter her skill level. In the introduction to every episode their ranking in line to inherit the throne changes, always 50 or more places away.

== Episodes ==
=== Season 1 ===
#	Title	Order for Throne	
1	Los Angeles	50th	51st
2	Boston	83rd	84th
3	Texas	74th	75th
4	New York	78th	79th
5	Detroit	98th	99th
6	Washington DC	69th	70th
7	Nashville	50th	51st

=== Season 2 ===
#	Title	Order for Throne		Airdate
1	Beauty	60th	61st	18 January 2016
2	Great Outdoors	68th	69th	18 January 2016
3	Sports	78th	79th	25 January 2016
4	Romance	80th	81st	25 January 2016
5	Future	58th	59th	1 February 2016
6	Law and Order	59th	60th	1 February 2016
7	Work	70th	71st	8 February 2016
8	Holidays	63rd	64th	8 February 2016

== Critical reception ==
According to review aggregator website Metacritic, Almost Royal has a score of 71%, indicating "generally favorable reviews". One favorable review was written by Brian Lowry for Variety, who praised the show for its "...mix of deft writing and [Amy and Ed]'s deadpan improvisational skills." On Rotten Tomatoes, Almost Royal's season 1 has an aggregate score of 75% based on 9 positive and 3 negative critic reviews. The website's consensus reads: "Almost Royal refreshingly lampoons both American and British cultures without abjection and benefits from Gamble and Hoggart's keen improvisational skills."

== International airings ==
Almost Royal began airing on E4 in the UK on August 9, 2014 and on The Comedy Channel in Australia on November 23, 2015.
