= Amy Hoggart =

American actress

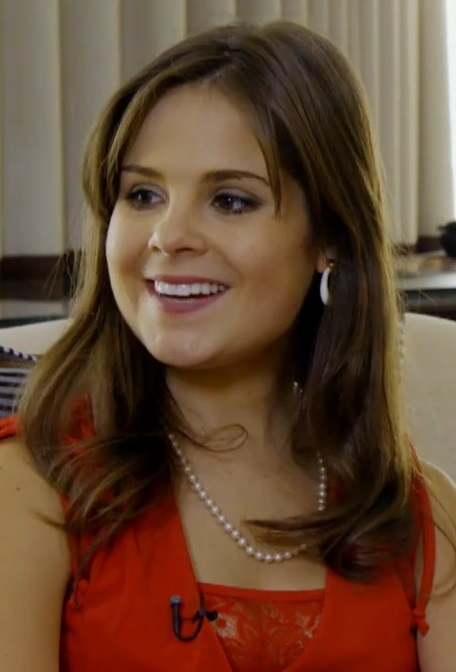
- Hoggart in Almost Royal 2015
- Born: 14 April 1986 (age 40); Washington, D.C., U.S.
- Education: King's College, Cambridge (BA); University of Sussex (MA)
- Parent: Simon Hoggart
- Relatives: Richard Hoggart (paternal grandfather); Paul Hoggart (paternal uncle)

Comedy career
- Years active: 2014–present
- Medium: Stand-up; television; music

Amy Hoggart (born 14 April 1986) is a British-American stand-up comedian and actress, best known for starring in Almost Royal, a faux-reality show on BBC America, and Full Frontal with Samantha Bee, an American political satire show on TBS.

== Early life ==
Amy Hoggart was born 14 April 1986 in Washington, D.C. She is the daughter of English journalist and broadcaster Simon Hoggart, who was a correspondent for The Observer in the 1980s. She has a brother named Richard, after their grandfather Richard Hoggart, an academic of British culture. Her uncle Paul Hoggart is a TV critic.

Hoggart's family moved back to the U.K. when she was four years old. While earning a BA in English literature at King's College, Cambridge, Hoggart performed with Footlights. She went on to earn a master's degree in experimental psychology from the University of Sussex.

== Career ==
Hoggart initially established herself with the "insufferably cute" character Pattie Brewster on the London standup comedy scene, which she describes as "brilliant" and "a great community".

Hoggart's first major TV role outside of standup comedy was Almost Royal, a faux-reality show on BBC America, in which Hoggart portrays a low-ranking heir to the British throne, Poppy Carlton, 51st in line to the British throne, and her brother, Georgie (Ed Gamble), as they tour the United States speaking to unsuspecting members of the public, in a style similar to the character Borat. When cast, Hoggart, whose background includes living in places such as Washington, D.C. and London, was expected to be able to affect the manner of British royalty, saying, "They asked if I could do an aristocratic accent." Almost Royal debuted on E4 in the UK, and on BBC America in 2014.

In February 2016, Hoggart made her debut as a correspondent for the political commentary satire series Full Frontal with Samantha Bee, in a segment in which she interviewed Donald Trump supporters about voter fraud. The segment eventually drew more than 2 million YouTube views. She next appeared in a segment in the special 9 November episode that aired the day after the presidential election vote. A February 2017 segment saw her journey to Scotland to interview citizens of Aberdeenshire, who protested Trump's attempts to persuade the government of Scotland to seize local farmer Michael Forbes' land in order to build a golf course. In 2020, it was announced that Hoggart was to host her own show, It's Personal with Amy Hoggart, on truTV, which premiered on 26 February 2020.
