= Poveglia =

Italian island

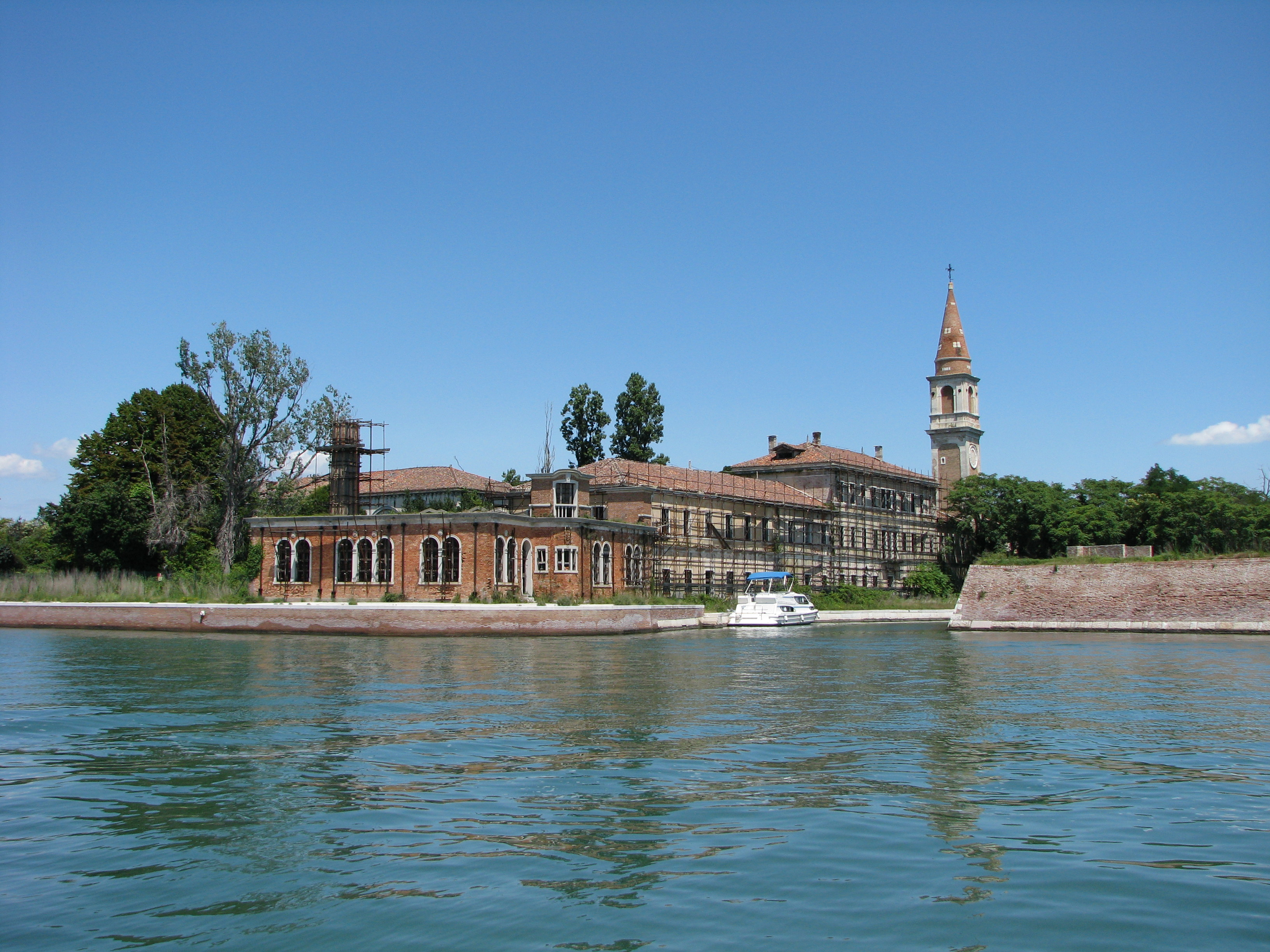
- The hospital on Poveglia

- Location within Venetian Lagoon

Geography
- Coordinates: 45°22′55″N 12°19′52″E
- Adjacent to: Venetian Lagoon

Administration
- Italy
- Region: Veneto
- Province: Province of Venice

Poveglia (/poʊˈvɛliə/ poh-VEL-ee-ə; Italian: [poˈveʎʎa]) is a small island located between Venice and Lido in the Venetian Lagoon, of northern Italy. Two small canals divide the island into three separate parts. The island first appears in the historical record in 421 and was populated and farmed until the residents fled warfare in 1379. For more than 100 years, beginning in 1776, the island was used as a quarantine station for incoming ships and their cargo, and later as a psychiatric hospital. The psychiatric hospital closed in 1968. After decades of neglect, the northern part of the island was granted as a concession to Poveglia per tutti in 2025 for development as a public park.

== History ==
The name "Poveglia" was anciently "Popilia", either from Latin populus (poplar) or from Via Popilia-Annia, built by consul Publius Popilius Laenas. In maps from the 16th century, it appears as "Poveggia".

After the 6th-century Lombard invasion of cities on the mainland, the island was used by settlers as a refuge, and it became a fortified settlement with a castle. By 864, Poveglia had become a fully inhabited centre based on fishing and on the production of salt.

Poveglia was destroyed during the War of Chioggia between the Republic of Genoa and the Republic of Venice, 1378-1381, leaving behind only tens of inhabitants.

From 1772, it was managed by the Magistrate for Health and used as a quarantine station for incoming ships and their cargo from 1793 until after the Second World War. In 1922 the existing buildings were converted into a nursing home/long-term care facility, until its closure in 1968, when it became state property.

Sylvia Sprigge, in her 1961 book ‘The Lagoon Of Venice; Its Islands, Life And Communications’, describes the site as a home for indigent old people. Sprygge relates delivering a letter to a Doctor on the island, and describes how the able-bodied residents tended agricultural plots, and made wine using the traditional method of crushing grapes underfoot.

In 2014, the Italian state auctioned a 99-year lease of Poveglia, which would remain state property, to raise revenue, hoping that the buyer would redevelop the damaged buildings. The highest bid was from Italian businessman Luigi Brugnaro, (€513,000), who planned to invest €20 million in a restoration plan. The lease did not proceed because his project was judged not to meet all the conditions. Other sources suggested that the deal was annulled because the bid was too low. Brugnaro initially fought the cancellation of the lease, but after he became mayor of Venice, he renounced any intentions to the island.

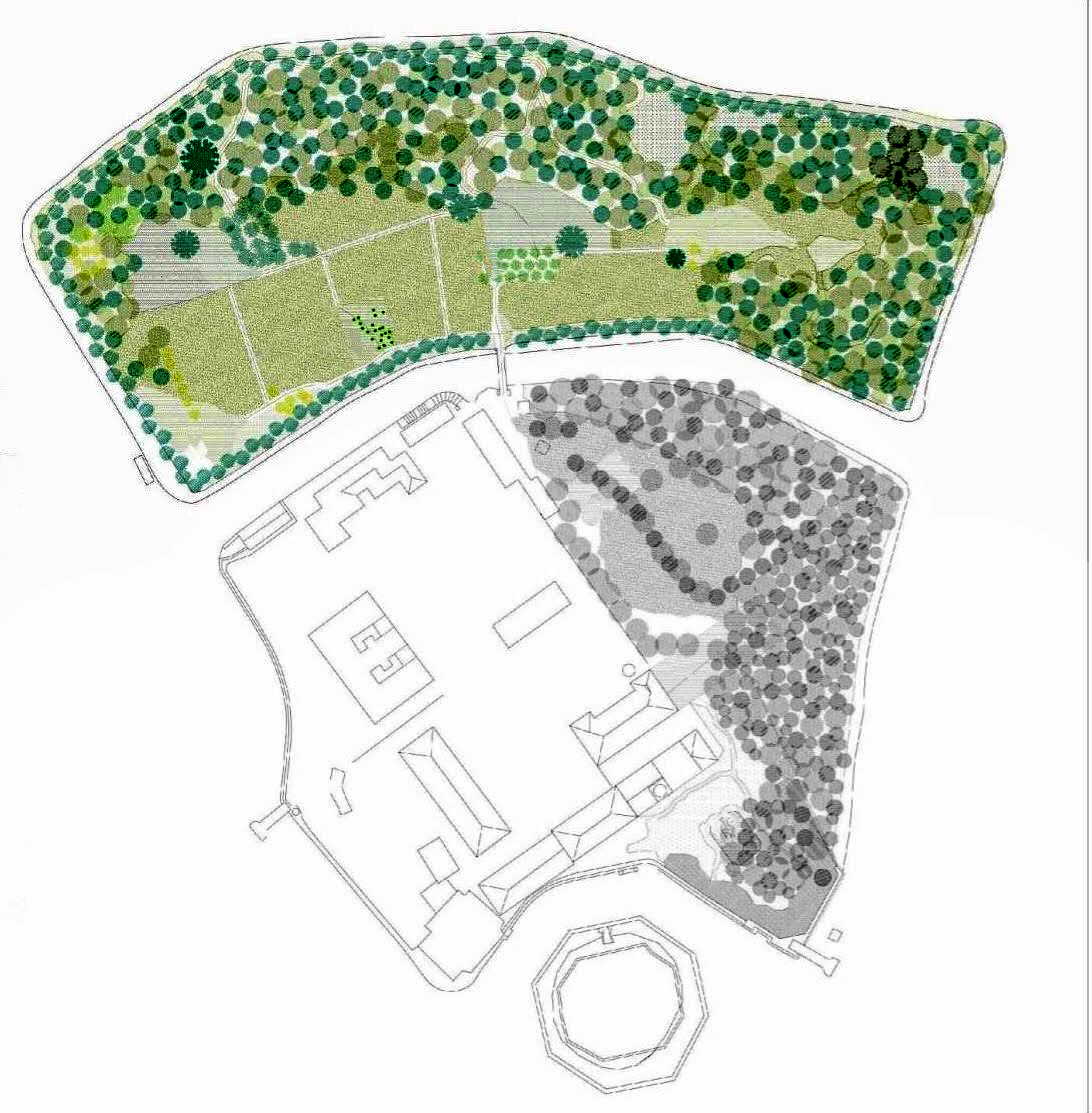
In green, the part of the island included in the 2025 concession to the Poveglia per tutti association.

In 2014, a citizens' association, Poveglia per tutti, was formed to prevent privatization and raised €460,000 from over 4,500 contributors in order to participate in the auction. The organization's goals were to transform the island into a freely accessible public park, repurpose existing buildings for revenue-generating cultural projects, and operate under sustainable community-oversight principles with equal decision-making rights for all members. Their initial bid was also unsuccessful. But after years of legal battles and repeated rejections, the Regional Administrative Court of Veneto ruled twice in favor of the association, finding that the Agency of State Property had not provided sufficient justification for denying concession requests. On August 1, 2025, Poveglia per tutti received a 6-year concession for the northern part of the island to implement their urban lagoon park project.

== Buildings and structures ==
The surviving buildings on the island consist of a cavana, a church, a hospital, an asylum, a bell-tower, housing and administrative buildings for the staff. The bell-tower is the most visible structure on the island, and dates back to the 12th century. It belonged to the church of San Vitale, which was demolished under Napoleon's orders in 1806. The tower was re-used as a lighthouse.

A bridge connects the island where buildings stand with the island that was given over to trees and fields. The octagonal fort is on a third, separate island, next to the island with the buildings, but unconnected to it. The fort consists solely of an earthen rampart faced on the outside with brick.

According to the CICAP, the claims that the island is haunted and that over 100,000 people are buried in plague pits were created by the American TV show Ghost Adventures in 2009. Alberto Toso Fei in an interview with the New York Times clarified that Poveglia was just one of several islands where victims were isolated during various plagues that swept through Venice over centuries, and that the total number of people who died from the plague on the island was closer to 20.

News reports in 2014/2015 said that the building and rusting artifacts still existed.

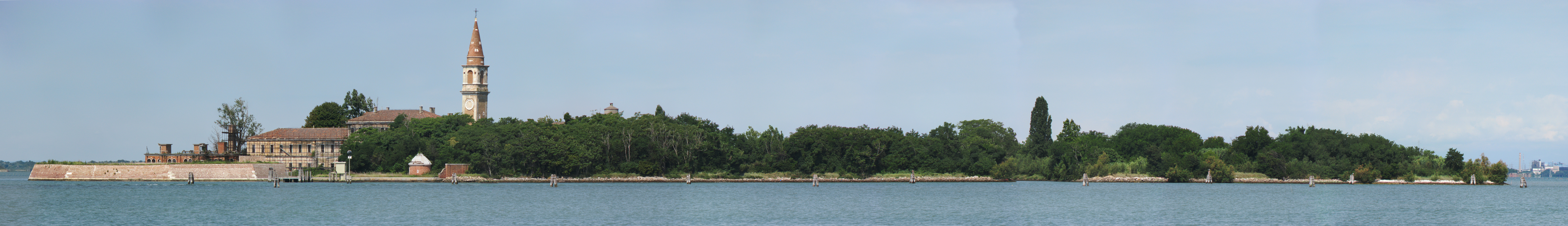
Poveglia as seen from Lido
