= Round-robin letter =

Letter typically included with a Christmas card

A round-robin letter or Christmas letter is a letter, typically included with a Christmas card and sent to multiple recipients at the end of the year, in which the writer describes the year's events for themselves and/or their family.

The round-robin letter has been the subject of much ridicule, particularly from the Guardian journalist Simon Hoggart, who pilloried examples of the genre in his newspaper column, as well as writing the book The Hamster That Loved Puccini: The Seven Modern Sins of Christmas Round-robin Letters. One example Hoggart cited read:

"Harry was Jesus in the school Jesus Christ, Superstar. This was the best production I have ever seen, youth or adult. Both boys, especially Harry, were physically and emotionally drained at the end. I was drained too… seeing your son crucified nightly is not an experience I would recommend."

Critics have drawn attention to a number of typical negative characteristics of the letters, including the airbrushing of bad news, the "excruciating" level of banal detail, and the implied egocentricity and boastfulness of the sender.
