= The Elvis Dead =

2017 musical comedy stage show

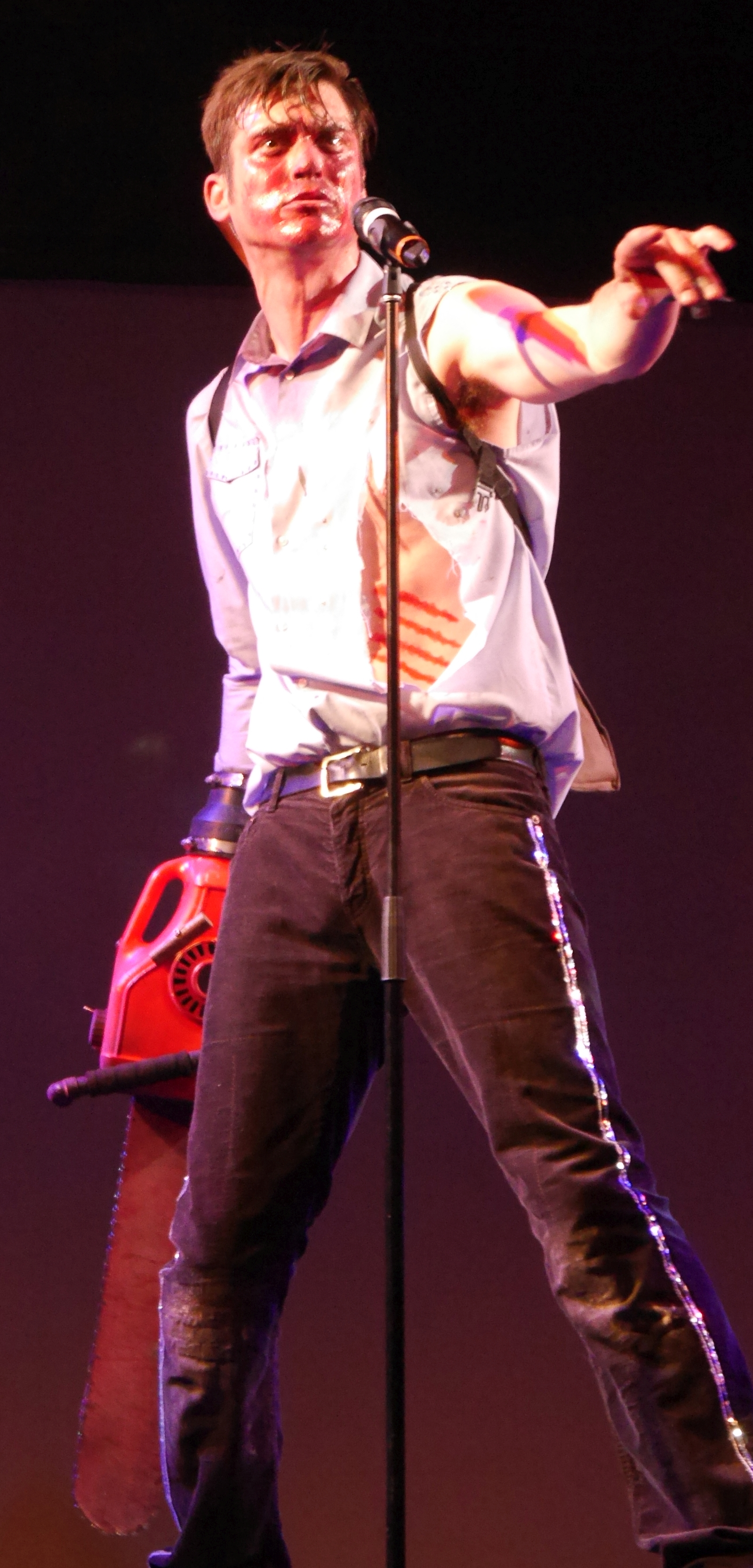
- Rob Kemp, The Elvis Dead, Glastonbury Festival, 2019
- Music: Elvis Presley
- Lyrics: Rob Kemp
- Basis: Evil Dead II, directed by Sam Raimi
- Premiere: 12 February 2017: The Soundhouse, Leicester Comedy Festival
- Awards: 2017 Leicester Comedy Festival Award for Best Show and Best Musical/Improv Show; 2017 Amused Moose Award for Outstanding Fringe Show; 2017 Malcolm Hardee Award for Act Most Likely to Make a Million Quid; 2017 Midlands Comedy Award for Breakthrough Act, Best Alternative Act and Best Live Show; 2018 Chortle Award for Best Newcomer

The Elvis Dead is a musical comedy stage show created by the English comedian Rob Kemp. The show is a retelling of the cult horror film Evil Dead II in the style of the musician Elvis Presley. The Elvis Dead has been critically acclaimed and has won numerous awards, most of them during the 2017 Edinburgh Festival Fringe, including a nomination for "Best Newcomer" in that year's Edinburgh Comedy Awards.

== Show ==
Show poster, 2017 Leicester Comedy Festival

The Elvis Dead features Kemp performing the dual roles of Ash Williams, the hero of Evil Dead II, and Elvis Presley. Kemp sings Presley's songs, the lyrics of which have been changed to suit the plot of the movie. Examples include "Jailhouse Rock", which is parodied as "Standing in a State of Shock", "All Shook Up" is turned into "I've Been Possessed", and "Suspicious Minds" becomes "Wrapped Up in Vines", the last of these featuring the opening lyrics: "We're caught in a trap / We can't walk out / Because the trees would kill us, baby". During the show excerpts from the film are played on a screen to help people understand the plot. Before the show Kemp tells his audience that the show is best treated like a rock concert, and encourages the audience to clap and sing along to his performance.

== Development ==
Kemp wrote on the show's official website: "The Elvis Dead is an audio/visual mash-up concert show, telling the story of Evil Dead 2 through the classic songs of Elvis Presley, and a love letter to both. ... Truth be told, I wrote a show for myself. A niche idea to amuse me and my friends, and as a challenge to see if I could do it. I am glad people like it though. Write what you know, they say." In interviews Kemp has said that one of the inspirations for the show was Bubba Ho-Tep, a 2002 horror comedy film starring Evil Dead II lead actor Bruce Campbell as Presley, fighting a reanimated mummy. Kemp has injured himself while performing the show, breaking his hand when previewing The Elvis Dead at the Leicester Comedy Festival in February 2017.

== Reception ==
The show has attracted positive reviews from critics, and has gained a cult following. Bruce Dessau writing for his website Beyond the Joke gave the show five stars out of five, praising Kemp's performance by saying: "He is Elvis. He is Bruce Campbell as Ash Williams in the Evil Dead Two and he is also, in odd unexpected moments, still Rob Kemp. Even when he's writhing on the floor with a demon Kemp sometimes pops out to ask in a Midlands accent if people are OK. Then it's back to full Elvis, back to the cabin in the woods, back to the forces of evil."

Marissa Burgess gave the show four out of five stars in Fest Magazine writing: "It's an inherently funny gimmick that doesn't drop a beat. One minute Kemp is crawling on the floor covered in blood trying to retrieve his zombie hand the next he's jumped back up regained his composure, lip curled and hip cocked ready to sing the next bastardised Elvis tune. Along the way there are chainsaws and quiffs, rifles and fringed shirts. It's a heady mix." The show got the same score from The Skinny with Tony Makos summing up the experience as: "The tunes are classic. The film is a classic. And this execution is so filled with love and joy that only a deadite would fail to be entertained. Hail to the King."

The Daily Telegraph's Tristram Fane Saunders gave a mixed three out of five stars review, describing the show as, "like a one-man Rocky Horror Show" but also saying: "Your enjoyment of this show will be directly proportional to how much you like the King and/or Evil Dead II." Similar comments were made by The Guardian's Brian Logan who wrote: "It will delight Evil Dead fans and Elvis fans more than the uninitiated. It's never more than the daft idea that attracted you to go to see it in the first place. But that's enough."

Kemp has said that he has yet to hear any reaction from the people behind the Evil Dead franchise, although he knows of people who have told Campbell about the show on Twitter. He has however been offered support from the producer of Evil Dead The Musical.

== Accolades ==
In April 2017, The Elvis Dead won two awards at the Leicester Comedy Festival, winning "Best Show" and "Best Musical/Improv Show", as well as being nominated for "Best Poster". It was the first show to win two awards in the same year at the festival. When the show was performed at that year's Edinburgh Fringe, it won three awards: "Outstanding Fringe Show" from the Amused Moose Awards, "Act Most Likely to Make a Million Quid" as the Malcolm Hardee Awards, and "Best Performer" at the Comedians' Choice Awards. It was also nominated for "Best Newcomer" at the Edinburgh Comedy Awards.

Year	Award	Category	Result	Ref
2017	Leicester Comedy Festival Awards	Best Show	Won	
2017	Leicester Comedy Festival Awards	Best Musical/Improv Show	Won	
2017	Leicester Comedy Festival Awards	Best Poster	Nominated	
2017	Amused Moose Awards	Main Prize	Nominated	
2017	Amused Moose Awards	Outstanding Fringe Show	Won	
2017	Malcolm Hardee Awards	Comic Originality	Nominated	
2017	Malcolm Hardee Awards	Act Most Likely to Make a Million Quid	Won	
2017	Edinburgh Comedy Awards	Best Newcomer	Nominated	
2017	The Comedians' Choice Awards	Best Show	Nominated	
2017	The Comedians' Choice Awards	Best Performer	Won	
2017	Midlands Comedy Awards	Best Act	Third	
2017	Midlands Comedy Awards	Breakthrough Act	Won	
2017	Midlands Comedy Awards	Best Alternative Act	Won	
2017	Midlands Comedy Awards	Best Live Show	Won	
2018	Chortle Awards	Best Newcomer	Won	
2018	Chortle Awards	Music & Variety	Nominated	

== Possible sequel ==
At the end of the show, Kemp said that his next show would be entitled Beatlesjuice. However, in an interview with The Guardian he had said that this is unlikely to happen, saying: "I don't think it would do anyone any favours for me to try and do something the same." He has since told the website The Latest that other ideas he is considering include, "the idea for a puppet show version of all of the Toho Godzilla movies, and if money was no object, they'd be full-size puppets, with the audience members' faces digitally mapped onto the extras faces in real-time! The other one was CSI: Jaws, with a shark investigator looking into the murder of an innocent shark in Amity."

Kemp eventually announced a work in process Edinburgh Fringe show of Beatlesjuice, running between 10th-23rd August 2025 at Hoots @ The Apex, held at The Apex Conference Center, Grassmarket.

== Home media ==
In November 2020, pre-orders were made available for a release of The Elvis Dead on VHS by the company Go Faster Stripe. The release would include a download code to see the show in HD, a lyric book, a postcard, a badge for the first 50 people to buy the video, and extras on the video as well. A deluxe DVD and a download version were also announced. All three versions were released on 3 December 2020. The main feature was a performance of The Elvis Dead at the fourth Go Faster Stripe festival. Extras include deleted scenes, an interview, an effect test, a trailer, and recordings of the first and second ever performances of the show.

== See also ==
- Evil Dead The Musical
