= The Bank Job (game show) =

2012 British game show

- Genre: Game show
- Presented by: George Lamb
- Theme music composer: Marc Sylvan
- Country of origin: United Kingdom
- Original language: English
- No. of series: 3 (incl. Celebrity special)
- No. of episodes: 16

Production
- Production location: Poultry, London
- Running time: 60–90 minutes (inc. adverts)
- Production company: Remarkable Television

Original release
- Network: Channel 4
- Release: 2 January – 17 March 2012

The Bank Job is a British television game show broadcast live on Channel 4, hosted by George Lamb. It was first broadcast on 2 January 2012 and ended on 17 March 2012.

== Format ==
=== Series 1 ===
Standing in a bank vault with 25 safe deposit boxes, four contestants answered questions to open the boxes and accumulate prize money during three rounds. The winner of the third round advanced to a grand final at the end of the week, in which their entire total was placed in a jackpot that went to the eventual winner. Scores were set to zero at the beginning of each round.

==== Round 1 ====
In the first round, cash amounts totaling £150,000 were placed in the boxes, at least four of which were left empty. The contestants answered toss-up questions on the buzzer for 90 seconds. A miss froze the contestant out of the next question, while a correct answer stopped the clock and allowed them to open one box. The cash it contained (if any) was placed in a briefcase on the contestant's podium, and they then had to decide whether to continue playing, or exit the vault with their case and sit out the rest of the round.

One contestant was eliminated with no winnings at the end of the round, based on the following rules:

- If only one contestant remained in the vault when time ran out, they were automatically eliminated.
- If everyone left early, the one with the lowest total was eliminated.
- If more than one contestant remained in the vault when time ran out, the host continued asking toss-up questions. A correct answer allowed a contestant to open one box, whose contents were added to their total, and leave the vault. The last contestant remaining in the vault was eliminated.

==== Round 2 ====
The second round was played under the same rules as the first, with new cash amounts distributed among the 25 boxes. Now, though, each contestant had two cases and could only place one bundle of cash in each. A contestant who answered a question correctly and found cash could either fill and close one case, or discard it in hopes of finding a larger amount later. Contestants had to remain in the vault as long as they had at least one case open, and were required to leave as soon as both were filled.

==== Round 3 ====
The total amount in the boxes was increased to £200,000, with at least four each of zeroes and "Steal" cards hidden among them. Each of the two remaining contestants had one case and an individual 45-second clock, and only one played at a time. The contestant with the higher combined total from the first two rounds decided who would play first. Once a contestant answered a question correctly, their clock stopped and they chose a box, whose amount was added to their case. Finding a Steal allowed them to take the largest bundle from the opponent's case, as long as the opponent had any cash and was still in the vault.

As before, after any correct answer, a contestant could either continue playing, or leave the vault and sit out the round. If they chose to continue, control passed to the opponent. The contestant who brought out more cash before their own clock ran out advanced to the series final, and the total they had accumulated during the entire game was added to the series jackpot.

==== Final ====
The winners of the five preliminary episodes competed through four rounds. The first two rounds followed the same format as the preliminaries, while the third followed the Round 1 rules but retained the Steal element.

In the fourth round, the two remaining contestants were each given two cases, one containing half the total jackpot ("Cash") and one containing newspaper ("Trash"). Each chose one case to give to the other, in a variant of the prisoner's dilemma.

- If both gave Cash, they split the jackpot evenly.
- If one gave Cash and the other Trash, the Trash-giving contestant won the entire jackpot.
- If both gave Trash, neither won any money and the jackpot was split among the other three contestants.

=== Series 2 ===
In series 2, instead of a tournament format, the winner of each game received whatever cash they had earned in Round 3 and returned to compete in the next episode. Other changes were as follows:

- Steals were present in all three rounds.
- One box in each round held a "Bankrupt" card, which reset a contestant's total to zero if found. Totals from previous rounds were not affected.
- The Round 1 time limit was reduced to 75 seconds.
- In Round 2, a contestant could choose to leave the vault after filling only one of their two cases.
- In Round 3, the total in the boxes was £150,000 plus the amounts collected by the two remaining contestants in Rounds 1 and 2.
- The final was played with four preliminary winners and the highest-scoring runner-up, and a jackpot of £100,000 was at stake in the fourth round.

==== The Celebrity Bank Job ====
For the last two episodes of series two (16 and 17 March 2012), eight celebrities played The Bank Job for charity. The contestants on the 16 March episode were Amy Childs, Alex James, Donal MacIntyre and Rachel Riley. On the 17 March episode, the contestants were Krishnan Guru-Murthy, Martin Kemp, Shappi Khorsandi and Olivia Lee. The winner took home whatever they found in the final round, and the runner-up earned £5,000 for their charity. Riley won the first special, taking home £36,000 for her charity, and Shappi Khorsandi won the second special, taking home £59,000 for her charity.

== Transmissions ==
The first series aired six episodes between 2 January through 7 January 2012. Viewership ranged from 1.03 million on 5 January to 1.30 million on 7 January.

The second series aired eight episodes from 17 February to 10 March 2012, with a highest rating of 1.23 million viewers on 3 March. The celebrity specials aired on 16 and 17 March of that same year.

== Reception ==
Metro's Christopher Hooton gave The Bank Job a scathing review, commenting that it was "just Deal or No Deal with added George Lamb and questions", and that despite its title, there were no elements evoking the feel of a Hollywood heist at all, "unless Ocean's Fourteen involves George Clooney answering questions about Pirates of the Caribbean in a Next cardigan whilst squealing with delight." Readers of ukgameshows.com named it the sixth best new game show of 2012 in their "Hall of fame" poll but also the worst new game show of 2012 in their "Hall of shame" poll.
