= Zaguri family =

Noble family from Kotor

Zaguri Zagurović
- Noble family
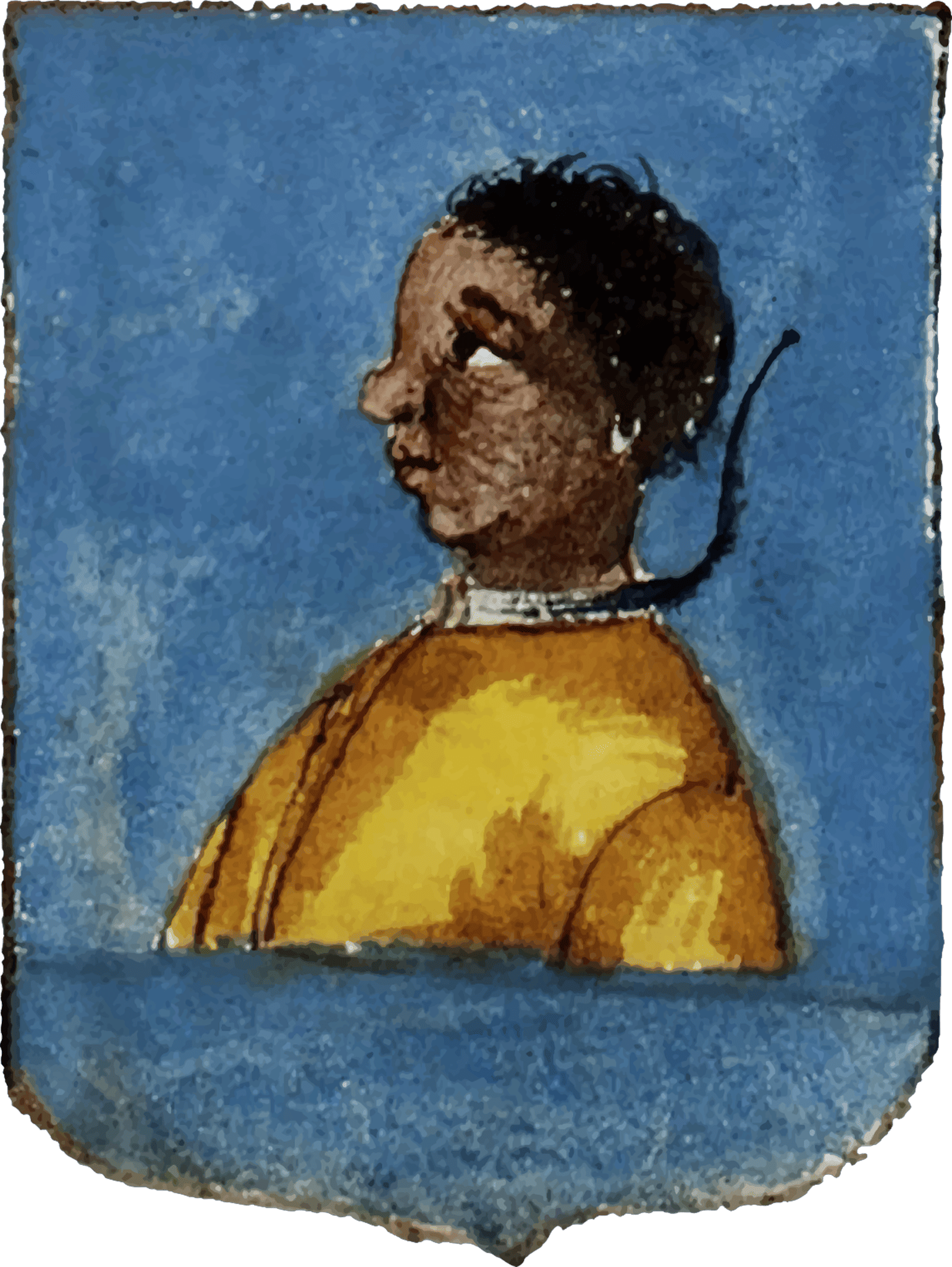
- Coat of arms of the Zaguri as depicted in the 1673 catalogue "Galleria D'Imprese Arme Ed'Insegne De Varii Regni..." by Marco Cremosano
- Country: Republic of Venice
- Origin: Cattaro
- Founded: 14th century
- Founder: Trifone Zaguri
- Members: Pietro I Antonio Zaguri; Marco Zaguri
- Connected families: Crnojević
- Dissolution: 1810

The Zaguri family was a Venetian noble family from Cattaro, in present-day Montenegro. They were active between the 14th and 16th century. By 1505, they became citizens of Venice, and in 1623, they were granted Venetian nobility status. The last members of the Venetian lineage died on September 12, 1810. They were counted among the ancient Slavic-speaking nobility of Cattaro. Related to the Serbian Crnojević Dynasty by marriage, the family hosted Đurađ Crnojević, the final ruler of the Principality of Zeta at their palazzo in Venice when he was forced into exile.

== History ==
The first mention of this family name was related to history of Petilovrijenac, three Catholic martyrs. Depending from source, they lived and died in 840, 1169 or 1249. Later documents from 1326 recorded that a certain Ilija Nikolin Zagurović from Bar moved to Kotor and bought a house. He and his family became nobility when he married Ruža Nucije Gile from Kotor. Nikola Zagurović was mentioned in one document dated 8 August 1397. Stefan Zagurović, great-grandfather of poet Ilija, was mentioned in 1420 as a member of the Great Council of Venice. In 1437 Laurencije Zagurović was a trader in Kotor.

Ilija Zagurović, the grandfather of poet Ilija Zagurović, died in 1492. He had three sons, Franjo, Laurencije (Lovro) and Bernard. Franjo, who was a judge, died in 1516. He had a son Ilija (died in 1557) who was a notable poet. Bernard had two daughters, both married to members of Bona family. Laurencije distinguished himself during the defense of Venetian held Kotor from Ottoman attacks in 1503. His son Trifun was notable trader, a member of the Venetian Senate as representative of Kotor in 1553 and deputy in Venetian Senate in 1559 and 1563. He participated in Battle of Lepanto, was agent of Council of Ten and was responsible for diplomatic mail transport between Venice and Constantinopol. He was rewarded for his service to Venice Republic by role of deputy of Zara. He died of the plague in 1575, in Constantinopol, as part of Giacomo Sorzano diplomatic mission.

One of the most notable members of Zagurović family was Jerolim Zagurović. He was Catholic. Notable poet Ilija Zagurović was uncle of Jerolim Zagurović. This branch of Zagurović family was related to the powerful Serbian Crnojević family through the marriage of Jerolim Zagurović and Antonija Crnojević, the daughter of Lord Đurađ Crnojević of Zeta (r. 1489–96). They had a son, Anđelo, who lived in Venice. Jerolim's sons Anđelo and Ivan Zagurović ordered and financed publishing of the catechism written by Jacques Ledesma and translated probably by Bartol Sfondrati, printed in Venice in 1583 in printing house of Camilo Zanetti.

== Family tree ==
- Nikola Zaguri
  - Ilija Nikolin Zaguri (fl. 1326)
    - Nikola Zaguri (fl. 1397)
      - Stefan Zaguri (fl. 1420)
        - Laurencije Zaguri (fl. 1437)
          - Ilija Zaguri
            - Franjo (d. 1516)
              - Ilija (d. 1557), poet
            - Laurencije (Lovro) and wife Francesinha
              - Jerolim (c. d. 1572 1550–1580) 1) married Antonija Crnojević; 2) Marina Pellegrini
                - Anđelo( d. 10 VII 1626) married Franceschina Agustini
                  - Vincenzo
                  - Petro
                  - Girolamo
                  - Olimpia
                  - Marina (fl. 1658)
                  - Virginia
                  - Lucia
                  - Elisabeta
                  - Pellegrina
                - Ivan
              - Trifun (fl. 1553, d. 1575)
                - Žunjo Batista
            - Bernard
              - Unknown daughter married to member of the Bona family
              - Unknown daughter married to member of the Bona family

== Sources ==
- Bibliografi (1985). Susreti bibliografa ... (in Serbian). Narodna biblioteka "Dr Đorđe Natošević".
- Biblioteka, Matica Srpska (Novi Sad) (1995). Godǐsnjak Biblioteke Matice srpske za ... Biblioteka Matice srpske.
- Društvo istoričara (1973). Istorijski zapisi: organ Istoriskog instituta i Društva istoričara SR Crne Gore (in Serbian). Istorijski institut u Titogradu.
- Institut (1973). Istorijski zapisi: organ Istoriskog instituta i Društva istoričara SR Crne Gore. Istorijski institut u Titogradu.
- Jakić (1866). Priměri starohèrvatskoga jezika iz glagolskih i cirilskih knjževnih starinah: sastavljeni za sedmi i osmi gomnazijalni razred. Uvod i priměri starohrvatski. Jakić.
- Milović, Jevto M. (1986). Štamparska i književna djelatnost: radovi sa Naučnog skupa Titograd, 19. i 30. septembra 1983. Crnogorska akademija nauka i umjetnosti.
- sekcija, Društvo istoričara Crne Gore. Kotorska (1970). Kotorska sekcija Društva istoričara Crne Gore 1948-1968. Društvo istoričara Crne Gore.
- Spomenik (1953). Spomenik.
- umetnosti, Srpska akademija nauka i (1964). Grada (in Serbian).
- Zadruga (1993). Istorija srpskog naroda: knj. Srbi pod tuđinskom vlašđu, 1537-1699 (2 v.). Srpska književna zadruga. ISBN 9788637904762.
