= Bartol Sfondrati =

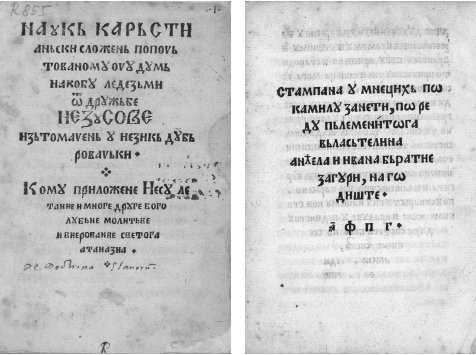
- 1583 edition of the translation of Ledesma catechism
- Born: 1541; Ragusa, Republic of Ragusa (modern-day Croatia)
- Died: 17 November 1583 (aged 41–42); Timișoara, Ottoman Empire (modern-day Romania)
- Other names: Bartolomeo Sfondrati
- Known for: first Ragusan jesuit
- Notable work: Dottrina christiana. Composta per il P. D. Ledesma della Compagnia di Gesu; Et tradotta di lingua italiana in lingua Schiava per un padre della medesima Compagnia

Bartol Sfondrati (1541—1583) was 16th century Jesuit missionary who is considered as the first Ragusan Jesuit. Sfondrati became a jesuit in 1569 after graduating law at the University of Pavia.

== Early life ==
Sfondrati's ancestors came from Cremona (modern-day Italy) to Ragusa several generations before Bartol was born. It is assumed that his year of birth is 1541.

== Education ==
Sfondrati became a law student in Pavia in 1566 supported by Ragusan Senate with yearly scholarship of 30 golden scudo. After completion of the canonic and civil law school at the University of Pavia Sfondrati became a Jesuit on 17 October 1569. After he was a student at college in Rome in period 1570—75 he became a priest confessor at Illyrian College of St. Jerome.

== Missionary campaigns ==
In the period between February 1576 and 1578 Sfondrati was a missionary in Boka Kotorska bay. In period c. 1580—83 Sfondrati was missionary in Belgrade. In 1580 Sfondrati accompanied Bonifacio de Stefanis (Bonifacije Drakolica) who was appointed as apostolic visitor and delegate to Dalmatia, Herzegovina, Bosnia, Croatia, Vallachia, Slavonia, Serbia and other European territories governed by the Ottomans. Together with Sfondrati, the Holy Seat sent another jesuit to accompany de Stefanis. It was Franciscan from Bosnia, Antun de Mattei. Two of them carried two big suitcases to de Stefanis, full of books they were instructed to deliver to priests of both Catholic and Orthodox religion.

Sfondrati reported that during his voyage into Ottoman Balkans he met many Christians who converted to Islam to avoid payment of taxes, from which Muslims were exempt. Sfondrati stated that there was about 5,000 Catholics at that time in Sarajevo, mostly slaves and traders. He also recorded that many Christians lived in Herzegovina, most of them being Orthodox Serbs.

De Stefanis died on this difficult visitation in Timișoara in 1582. Sfondrati died in poverty and dimwitted, also in Timișoara, on 17 November 1583.

== Literary work ==
On 12 January 1576 Sfondrati wrote from Dubrovnik to Claudio Aquaviva emphasizing that Ragusan Republic have intention to publish a catechism on Slavic language for its younger population.

It is assumed that Sfondrati translated the catechism written by Jacques Ledesma. The publishing of this catechism was ordered by brothers Angel and Ivan Zagurović, of Zagurović noble family. They were sons of Jerolim Zagurović, a Venetian printer of Serbian Cyrillic books and according to some sources grandsons of Đurađ Crnojević who was the founder of the first South Slavic printing house.

The first edition of his translation was published in 1576 in Venice. The second edition was published in 1578 also in Venice, in the printing house of Zanetti, with the following title: "Dottrina christiana. Composta per il P. D. Ledesma della Compagnia di Gesu; Et tradotta di lingua italiana in lingua Schiava per un padre della medesima Compagnia. Nuovamente stampata & corretta. In Venetia, Appresso Bonifatio Zanetti, MDLXXVIII". The third edition of this translation was published on Cyrillic script in 1583. Zanetti is also mentioned in prologue of the Flower Triod printed by Stefan Marinović in Scutari in 1563. In first two editions published in Latin script, the language of translation is referred to as "lingua Schiava" (lang-en|Slavonic language), while the third edition published on Cyrillic script refers to this language as Ragusan language,

The only survived copy of third edition of translation is kept in the National Library of Russia in St Petersburg.

== Sources ==
- Korade, Mijo; Aleksić, Mira; Matoš, Jerko (1993). Isusovci i hrvatska kultura. Hrvatski povijesni institut u Beču.
- Stanojević, Stanoje (1925). Narodna enciklopedija srpsko-hrvatsko-slovenac̆ka. Izdavac̆: Bibliografski zavod d.d.
- Krleža, Miroslav (1988). Enciklopedija Jugoslavije: Hrv - Janj. Jugoslavenski Leksikografski Zavod "Miroslav Krleža". ISBN 978-86-7053-013-3.
- Zorić, Damir (2002). Ferdinand Konšćak: misionar i istraživač. Nakladni zavod Matice hrvatske. ISBN 978-953-185-063-6.
- Krasić, Stjepan (2009). Počelo je u Rimu: Katolička obnova i normiranje hrvatskoga jezika u XVII. stoljeću. Matica Hrvatska. ISBN 978-953-6316-76-2.
- Associazione (1995). Rivista dalmatica. Associazione nazionale dalmata di Roma.
- Kolendić, Petar; Pantić, M. (1964). Iz staroga Dubrovnika. Srpska književna zadruga.
- Vanino, Miroslav (1936). Vrela i prinosi. Nova tiskara.
- HBA (1933). Croatia sacra. Hrvatska bogoslovska akademija.
- Pavlović, Dragoljub (1931). Dorde Bašić. Drz. štamarija Kraljevine Jugoslavije.
- HT (1934). Fontes et studia historiae Societatis Iesu in finibus Croatorum. Hrvatska tiskara D.D.
- Đorđić, Petar (1987). Istorija srpske ćirilice. Zavod za udžbenike i nastavna sredstva. ISBN 9788617003386.
