= Simon Hoggart =

English journalist and broadcaster (1946–2014)

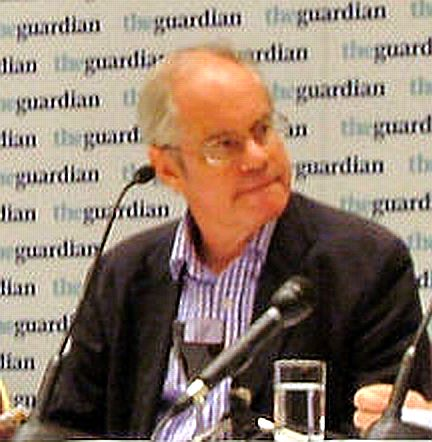
- Hoggart in 2006
- Born: Simon David Hoggart; 26 May 1946; Ashton-under-Lyne, England
- Died: 5 January 2014 (aged 67); London, England
- Education: King's College, Cambridge (BA)
- Occupations: Journalist; broadcaster
- Years active: 1968–2013
- Spouses: Alyson
- Children: 2, including Amy
- Relatives: Richard Hoggart (father); Paul Hoggart (brother)

Simon David Hoggart (26 May 1946 – 5 January 2014) was an English journalist and broadcaster. He wrote on politics for The Guardian, and on wine for The Spectator. Until 2006, he presented The News Quiz on BBC Radio 4. His journalism sketches have been published in a series of books.

== Personal life ==
Simon Hoggart was born on 26 May 1946 in Ashton-under-Lyne, Lancashire, and was educated at Hymers College in Kingston upon Hull, Wyggeston Boys' School in Leicester, and then King's College, Cambridge, where he excelled at history and English. He was the son of the literary scholar and sociologist Richard Hoggart, and Mary Holt Hoggart. His brother is the Times television critic Paul Hoggart. He lived in South London with his wife, Alyson, a clinical psychologist, and their two children, Amy and Richard.

Hoggart was diagnosed with terminal pancreatic cancer in mid-2010 and died of the disease at Royal Marsden Hospital on 5 January 2014.

== Career ==
Hoggart joined The Guardian in 1968, later becoming the American correspondent for The Observer, and occasional guest commentator on National Public Radio's Weekend Edition Saturday. Having written on politics for some years in Punch magazine, Hoggart became the Parliamentary sketch writer for The Guardian in 1993. He also wrote a wine column for The Spectator. Hoggart's sketchwriting prowess was still admired into the 2010s – Total Politics noted that in 2011 Hoggart had "been a regular tormenter of the prime minister" (David Cameron), "especially on the sensitive issue of the PM's bald patch, which Hoggart compared to "a goujon of plaice" from Marks and Spencer".

In the early 1980s, he chaired the radio comedy show The News Quiz, returning to the show in 1996 for another ten years. In March 2006, Hoggart presented his last edition of The News Quiz, commenting: "I'm getting a bit clapped out and jaded, and I think that's beginning to show."

In 1998, he was part of BBC Radio 4's 5-part political satire programme Cartoons, Lampoons and Buffoons. He was also a contributor to the Grumpy Old Men and wrote for Punch magazine and an occasional column for New Humanist magazine (last entry May 2005). Hoggart was also an occasional celebrity panellist on BBC2's antiques quiz show Going, Going, Gone.

His published books form an eclectic list, including debunking the supernatural, anecdotes about Parliament, a biography, his thoughts about the United States, a serious political review and collected Christmas round-robin letters. He coined the phrase "the law of the ridiculous reverse", "which states that if the opposite of a statement is plainly absurd, it was not worth making in the first place".

When speculation appeared in the News of the World in December 2004 suggesting he was the "third man" in the Kimberly Quinn affair, Hoggart initially denied any involvement before issuing a statement admitting that he had had an extra-marital affair with Quinn before her own marriage. The political sex scandal involving Quinn contributed to the resignation of David Blunkett from the Cabinet.

== Works ==
=== Books ===
- Simon Hoggart, House of Fun, Guardian Books (2012), ISBN 978-1-78335-028-5; parliamentary sketches
- Simon Hoggart, Send Up the Clowns, Guardian Books (17 October 2011), ISBN 978-0-85265-243-5
- Simon Hoggart, A Long Lunch: My Stories and I'm Sticking to Them, John Murray (14 October 2010), ISBN 978-1-84854-397-3
- Simon Hoggart, Life's Too Short to Drink Bad Wine, Quadrille Publishing Ltd (18 September 2009), ISBN 978-1-84400-742-4
- Simon Hoggart, The Hands of History: Parliamentary Sketches 1997–2007 (2007), ISBN 1-84354-679-5
- Simon Hoggart and Emily Monk, Don't Tell Mum: Hair-raising Messages Home from Gap-year Travellers, Atlantic Books (27 December 2006), ISBN 978-1-84354-539-2
- Simon Hoggart, The Hamster That Loved Puccini: The Seven Modern Sins of Christmas Round-Robin Letters (2005), ISBN 1-84354-474-1
- Simon Hoggart, The Cat That Could Open the Fridge: A Curmudgeon's Guide to Christmas Round-Robin Letters (2004), ISBN 1-84354-357-5
- Simon Hoggart, Punchlines: A Crash Course in English with John Prescott (2003), ISBN 0-7434-8397-9; on Prescottese language
- Simon Hoggart, Playing to the Gallery: Parliamentary Sketches from Blair Year Zero (2002), ISBN 1-903809-66-5; parliamentary sketches
- Simon Hoggart and Steve Bell, Live Briefs: A Political Sketch Book (1996), ISBN 0-413-70970-1; parliamentary sketches, with the Guardian political cartoonist
- Simon Hoggart, House of Correction (1995), ISBN 0-86051-998-8; parliamentary sketches
- Simon Hoggart and Mike Hutchinson, Bizarre Beliefs (1995), ISBN 1-86066-021-5; on "the human desire to believe the unbelievable"
- Simon Hoggart, America: A User's Guide (1991), ISBN 0-00-637602-9; on his experiences living in the United States
- Simon Hoggart (editor), House of Cards: A Selection of Modern Political Humour (1988), ISBN 0-241-12451-4
- Simon Hoggart, House of Ill Fame (1985), ISBN 0-86051-350-5; parliamentary sketches
- Simon Hoggart, Back On the House (1982), ISBN 0-330-28148-8; parliamentary sketches
- Simon Hoggart, On the House: The Personalities and the Politics From the Irreverent "Punch" Column (1981), ISBN 0-330-26883-X; parliamentary sketches
- Simon Hoggart and David Leigh, Michael Foot: A Portrait (1981), ISBN 0-340-27600-2; biography of politician Michael Foot
- Simon Hoggart and Alistair Michie, The Pact: The Inside Story of the Lib-Lab Government, 1977-8 (1978), ISBN 0-7043-3236-1
- Bryan McAllister and Simon Hoggart, Little Boxes: A Selection of Bryan McAllister Cartoons From "The Guardian" (1977), ISBN 0-85265-024-8

=== Audiobooks ===
- The News Quiz: The First 25 Years (BBC Radio Collection) (2003), ISBN 0-563-49402-6
- Simon Hoggart's Pick of "The News Quiz": Vol 2 (2002), ISBN 0-563-52923-7
- Simon Hoggart's Pick of "The News Quiz": Vol 1 (2000), ISBN 0-563-47762-8
