= Midlands Comedy Awards =

The Midlands Comedy Awards are an annual awards ceremony for live comedy performers and comedy clubs based in The Midlands region of England. It also recognises achievement in online comedy. They were founded in 2014 and give out awards in eleven categories every year.

== History ==
The Midlands Comedy Awards were created by Birmingham-based comedian Jay Shareef in 2014, "to recognise the huge number of hard working and talented people in [the] regional comedy community".

== Rules and eligibility ==
The finalists for the awards are chosen by comedy clubs and media professionals from the Midlands region, and only comedians and comedy clubs based in either the East Midlands or West Midlands qualify. This means that comedians resident in The Midlands are eligible even if they are originally from elsewhere. The awards include the following counties in their definition of the Midlands region: Cambridgeshire, Derbyshire, Herefordshire, Leicestershire, Lincolnshire, Nottinghamshire, Northamptonshire, Rutland, Shropshire, Staffordshire, Warwickshire, West Midlands and Worcestershire.

Before Brexit, the awards accepted the definition of East Midlands and West Midlands as the areas represented in the European Parliament by those constituencies.

== Winners ==
=== 2021 ===
Best Act

- Winner – Scott Bennett
- Runner up – Stevie Gray
- Third place – Josh Pugh

Best MC

- Winner – Jon Pearson
- Runner up – Barry Dodds
- Third place – Tommy Tomski

Breakthrough Act

- Winner – Tal Davies
- Runner up – Eric Rushton
- Third place – Kevin Daniel

Best New Act

- Winner – Ricky Balshaw
- Runner up – Josh Reynolds
- Third place – Leanne Easthope

Alternative Act

- Winner – Good Kids
- Runner up – The Boys From The All Night Chemist
- Third place – Richard Dadd

Best Live Show

- Winner – Scott Bennett - Relax
- Runner up – Jon Pearson - What Have You Been Up To?
- Third place – Richard Dadd - Tea With The Devil

Online Comedy

- Winner – Jack Kirwan
- Runner up – Scott Bennett
- Third place – Mary Flanigan

Best Comedy Club

- Winner – Hollywood Comedy Club
- Runner up – The Glee Club
- Third place – Funhouse Comedy

Best Small Club

- Winner – NCF
- Runner up – The Holly Bush
- Third place – RockCentral

Best Open Mic Show

- Winner – The Holly Bush
- Runner up – Canal House (NCF)
- Third place – Kamikaze Club

Outstanding Contribution

- Geoff Rowe (Leicester Comedy Festival)

=== 2020 ===
The awards did not take place due to the COVID-19 pandemic.

=== 2019 ===
Best Act

- Winner – Scott Bennett
- Runner up – Josh Pugh

Best MC

- Winners (joint) – Chris Oxenbury and Tommy Tomski
- Third Place (joint) – Barry Dodds and James Cook

Rising Star

- Winner – Douglas Carter
- Runner up – Celya AB

Best New Act

- Winner – Lovell Smith
- Runner up – Tal Davies

Alternative Act

- Winners (joint) – Good Kids and Donald Mackerel
- Third Place – Roger Swift

Best Live Show

- Winner – Josh Pugh
- Runners up (joint) – Parapod Live and Thomas Green

Online Comedy

- Winner – Jack Kirwan
- Runner up – Katy Trev

Best Comedy Club

- Winner – The Glee Club
- Runner up – NCF

Best Small Club

- Winner – Ofton Funny
- Runners up (joint) – Cherrybomb Comedy, The Kamikaze Club and The Holly Bush

Best Open Mic Show

- Winner – Useful Idiot
- Runner up – NCF £1 Night

=== 2018 ===
Best Act

- Winner – Scott Bennett
- Runner up – Josh Pugh

Best MC

- Winner – Barry Dodds
- Runner up – Jason Neale

Best New Act

- Winner – Douglas Carter
- Runner up – Donald Mackerel

Best Live Show

- Winner – Scott Bennett: Leap Year
- Runner up – Laura Monmoth: LGBTQZX

Best Comedy Club

- Winner – The Glee Club
- Runner up – Funhouse Comedy

Best Small Club

- Winner – NCF
- Runner up – The Holly Bush

=== 2017 ===
Best Act

- Winner – Joe Lycett
- Runner up – Luisa Omielan
- Third place – Rob Kemp

Best MC

- Winner – Barry Dodds
- Runner up – Gareth Berliner
- Third place – Stevie Gray

Breakthrough Act

- Winner – Rob Kemp
- Runner up – Pete Teckman
- Third place – Jack Kirwan and Sarah Johnson (joint)

Best New Act

- Winner – Jem Braithwaite
- Runner up – Gina Overton
- Third place – Count Evil

Best Alternative Act

- Winner – Rob Kemp
- Runner up – Jack Kirwan
- Third place – Andrew McBurney

Best Live Show

- Winner – Rob Kemp
- Runner up – Josh Pugh
- Third place – Phil Pagett

Online Comedy

- Winner – Jack Kirwan
- Runner up – Masai Graham
- Third place – Craig Deeley

Best Comedy Club

- Winner – The Glee Club
- Runner up – Funhouse Comedy
- Third place – Laff Attack

Best Small Club

- Winner – Funhouse Comedy
- Runner up – FAF Comedy
- Third place – CAN Comedy and Blue Giraffe (joint)

Best Open Mic Show

- Winner – The Holly Bush (Cradley Heath)
- Runner up – Comedy and Cocktails (Leicester)
- Third place – NCF £1 Comedy Night (Nottingham)

Outstanding Contribution

- Winner – Spiky Mike (Funhouse Comedy)

=== 2016 ===
Best Act

- Winner – Duncan Oakley
- Runner up – Masai Graham
- Third place – Scott Bennett

Best MC

- Winner – Barry Dodds
- Runner up – Gareth Berliner
- Third place – Jon Pearson and Wayne Beese (joint)

Best Live Show

- Winner – Late Night with Boabby Roaster
- Runner up – I Came, I Saw, I Complained
- Third place – Hell To Play

Breakthrough Act

- Winner – Masai Graham
- Runner up – Alex Hylton
- Third place – Josh Pugh

Best New Act

- Winner – Moses Ali Khan
- Runner up – Sarah Johnson
- Third place – Harvey Hawkins

Alternative Act

- Winner – Paul Palmer
- Runner up – Andrew McBurney
- Third place – Daniel Nicholas

Online Comedy

- Winner – The Parapod
- Runner up – Jack Kirwan
- Third place – Masai Graham

Best Comedy Club

- Winner – Funhouse Comedy
- Runner up – The Glee Club
- Third place – Fitz of Laughter

Best Small Club

- Winner – FAF Comedy
- Runner up – Blue Giraffe Comedy
- Third place – Fitz of Laughter

Best Open Mic Show

- Winner – NCF Canal House
- Runner up – The Holly Bush
- Third place – Roadhouse Comedy

Outstanding Contribution

- Winner – Bushfest

=== 2015 ===
Best Act

- Winner – Tom Binns
- Runner up – Barbara Nice
- Third place – Andy White

Best MC

- Winner – Barry Dodds
- Runner up – Andy Robinson
- Third place – Jason Neale

Best Live Show

- Winner – Scott Bennett
- Runner up – Masai Graham
- Third place – Jon Pearson

Breakthrough Act

- Winner – Lucy Thompson
- Runner up – Masai Graham
- Third place – Patrick Draper

Best New Act

- Winner – Josh Pugh
- Runner up – Stu Woodings
- Third place – Thomas Rackham

Alternative Act

- Winner – Roger Swift
- Runner up – Johnny Sorrow
- Third place – Daniel Nicholas

Online Comedy

- Winner – Masai Graham
- Runner up – Club Smashing
- Third place – Mike O'Callaghan

Best Comedy Club

- Winner – Voodoo Stands Up (Stamford)
- Runner up – CAN Comedy (Black Country)

Best Small Club

- Winner – Funhouse Comedy
- Runner up – FAF Comedy

Best Open Mic Show

- Winner – The Holly Bush (Cradley Heath)
- Runner up – Roadhouse Comedy (Birmingham)
- Third place – NCF Canal House (Nottingham)

Outstanding Contribution

- Winner – Suzanne Rowland

=== 2014 ===
Best Act

- Winner – Andy Robinson
- Runner up – Masai Graham

Best Compere

- Winner – Andy Robinson
- Runner up – Dave Dinsdale

Breakthrough Act

- Winner – Hannah Silvester
- Runner up – Daniel Nicholas

Best New Act

- Winner – Tom Christian and Josh Pugh (joint winners)
- Runner up – Lucy Thompson

Best Comedy Club

- Winner – The Glee Club
- Runner up – CAN Comedy

Best Open Mic Show

- Winner – Fowl Humour
- Runner up – The Holly Bush

Outstanding Contribution

- Winner – Roger Swift
