= Ed Gamble =

British comedian and television presenter (born 1986)

- Gamble in 2026
- Born: Edward Stephenson Gamble; 10 March 1986 (age 40); Hammersmith, London, England
- Education: King's College School; Hatfield College, Durham
- Spouse: Charlie Jamison (m. 2021)

Comedy career
- Medium: Stand-up comedian, podcast host, writer, actor
- Website: edgamble.co.uk

Edward Stephenson Gamble (born 10 March 1986) is an English comedian, podcaster and television personality. He is best known for co-presenting the Off Menu podcast with James Acaster and appearances on comedy panel shows including Mock the Week and Taskmaster. He studied at Hatfield College, Durham University, where he began his comedy career performing with the Durham Revue, and was a finalist in the 2007 Chortle Student Comedy Awards.

== Early life and family ==
Gamble was brought up in Wandsworth and Raynes Park, southwest London. His mother, a nurse and health visitor for the NHS, and father, a solicitor, separated when he was four; he was raised mainly by his mother. He has a younger half-sister and a younger half-brother on his father's side.

He attended Highfield School and Nursery in Wandsworth and later King's College School, a private day school for boys in Wimbledon. At school, he "used humour as a defence mechanism". He said that "there's no way that people could make jokes about my weight if I was making them myself, faster and better. Aside from losing weight, this was the best way to ward off bullying, and there was no way I was going to lose weight. I loved food."

He attended Durham University, where he studied philosophy and met fellow comedians Nish Kumar, Nick Mohammed, and Tom Neenan. He was a member of Hatfield College.

Before working full-time as a comedian, Gamble worked jobs which included short stints of manual labouring, data entry, and working at the Raynes Park Tavern (since refurbished), a pub that was "surprisingly dangerous for the area" and "on more than one occasion when I arrived for work there was an ambulance parked outside. (...) One night I arrived for work and literally had to step over a pool of blood outside the door."

== Career ==
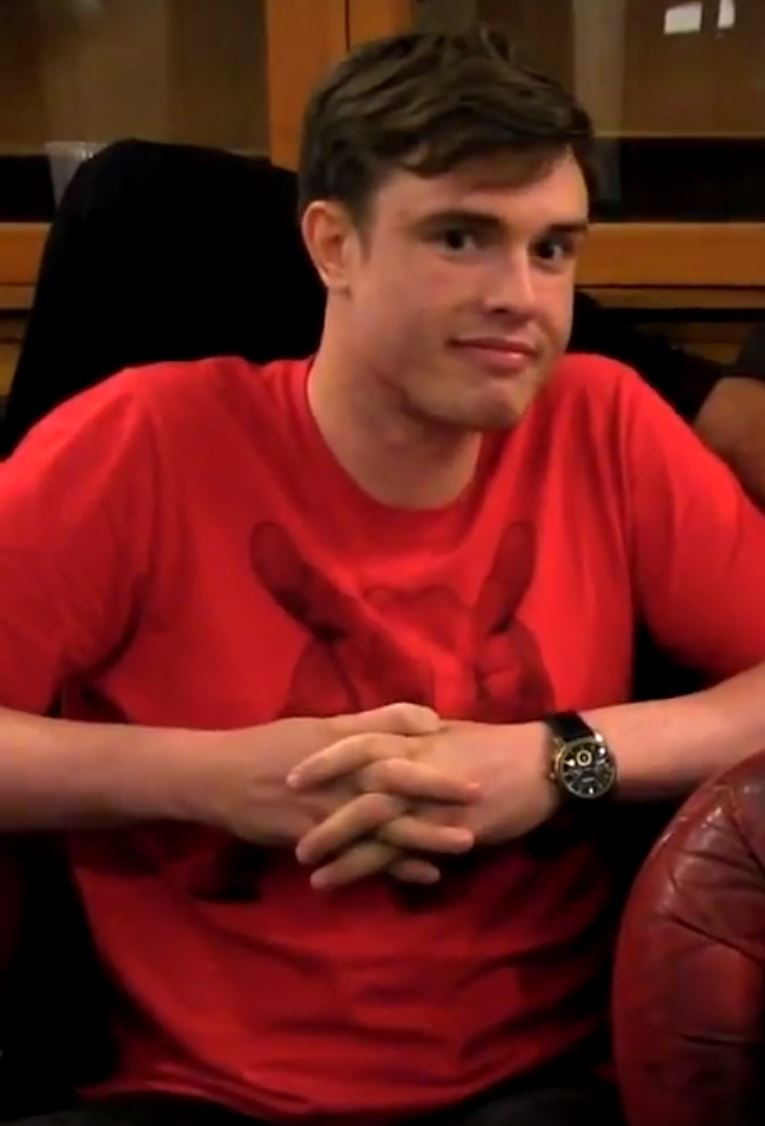
Ed Gamble - Interview with Waffle TV at Glasgow University Freshers Week 2012

Gamble's early work was alongside Ray Peacock, with whom he presented two different series of The Peacock and Gamble Podcast, totalling over 100 episodes. He also appeared on television, performing a 15-minute set on the extended version of Russell Howard's Good News on BBC Three in late 2010. He performed with Peacock at the Edinburgh Festival Fringe in 2011, 2012 and 2013, as well as supporting Greg Davies on his successful Firing Cheeseballs at a Dog Tour in 2011. Gamble also recorded a series of radio shows with Peacock on FUBAR Radio.

In 2014, Gamble debuted solo at Edinburgh Fringe with the show Gambletron 5000, returning in 2015 with Lawman and in 2016 with Stampede. His stand-up performances contain much observational comedy, often aimed at himself, including discussion of his Type 1 diabetes, which he was diagnosed with at 13; he chose that as the central topic of his 2018 Edinburgh Fringe show Blizzard and his Amazon Prime Video special Blood Sugar.

Gamble was a regular panellist on the BBC panel show Mock the Week from July 2015. In the same year, he appeared with Amy Hoggart in Almost Royal, a faux-reality show on BBC America, in which the two portrayed aristocratic siblings Georgie and Poppy Carlton. The first series aired on E4 in the UK and was followed by a second series in 2016. He guest-hosted the Elis James and John Robins Show on Radio X in 2017 and 2018. Since 2018, Gamble has presented the podcast Off Menu with Ed Gamble and James Acaster with fellow comedian James Acaster as well as a weekly Radio X show with Matthew Crosby from 2019 until 2026.

Gamble won the ninth series of Taskmaster in 2019. In 2022, Gamble featured in the second "Champions of Champions" special with fellow winners from series six to ten: Liza Tarbuck, Kerry Godliman, Lou Sanders and Richard Herring. He finished in last place. In October 2020, Gamble began presenting Taskmaster The Podcast, the official podcast companion to the TV show, following the series' move to Channel 4 from Dave. In 2023, Gamble hosted a non-broadcast pilot of Foodmaster, a food-themed spin-off of Taskmaster.

In 2020, Gamble narrated adverts for second hand car website Cazoo.

In 2020, Gamble was a guest judge on Great British Menu and, in February 2022, he became one of the judges for Series 17, 18 and 19.

In May 2022, Gamble was announced as one of six rotating co-hosts joining Alexander Armstrong on Pointless to replace Richard Osman, alongside Sally Lindsay, Konnie Huq, Lauren Laverne, Alex Brooker and Stephen Mangan.

Gamble appeared with Acaster on the fifth series of Celebrity Hunted (2023), which tasked participants with evading "Hunters" around the UK for a fortnight. During their appearance they ate in a Michelin starred restaurant, called into Gamble's Radio X programme, and released a video mocking the Hunters. Acaster also gave Gamble a tattoo. Gamble escaped after Acaster goaded the Hunters to the Taskmaster house and squirted them with a water gun. Gamble met with his wife and hid in a brewery and a climbing centre, but was caught soon after.

In 2022, Gamble toured the UK with his stand-up show Electric. In 2024, a poster advertising Gamble's Hot Diggity Dog tour fell foul of Transport for London's ban on junk food advertising; to comply with the rules, an image of a hot dog was replaced with a cucumber.

In October 2023, Gamble published his debut book, titled Glutton: The Multi-Course Life Of A Very Greedy Boy, an autobiography focused through his lifelong obsession with food.

In January 2024, he hosted The Traitors: Uncloaked, which was a visual podcast that accompanied the second series of The Traitors. It returned with Gamble as host for the third series in January 2025 and the fourth series in January 2026. Gamble also hosted The Celebrity Traitors: Uncloaked for the celebrity version of the show. His most recent tour, Hot Diggity Dog, included an Autumn tour extension with 85 UK dates and an Australia and New Zealand leg of the tour starting on 15 April 2024. Since 2026, he has hosted the TLC original panel show Ed Gamble's Unacceptable!

== Personal life ==
Gamble has type 1 diabetes, which he has addressed as part of his performances. He is a fan of nu metal music.

Gamble married TV producer and Supermilk member Charlotte Verity "Charlie" Jamison on 9 September 2021, after postponing three times due to the COVID-19 pandemic. The couple have been together since 2011 and live in London.
