= Ian Boldsworth =

British comedian (born 1973)

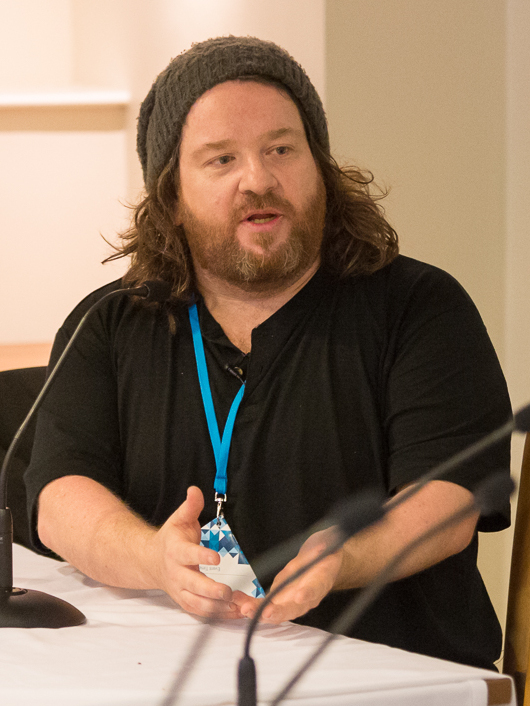
- Ian Boldsworth in 2017
- Born: Richard Ian Boldsworth; 27 June 1973 (age 53); Warrington, Lancashire, England
- Occupations: Comedian, actor, podcast host, writer
- Years active: 2002–present
- Website: ianboldsworth.co.uk

Richard Ian Boldsworth (27 June 1973, in Warrington, England), previously known by the stage name Ray Peacock, is an English comic performer, best known for The ParaPod, The Peacock and Gamble Podcast and The Ray Peacock Podcast. He came to prominence in the Big and Daft comedy trio.

== Career ==
Boldsworth made his debut at the Edinburgh Fringe in 2002, originally as a brash Yorkshireman character named Ray Peacock who soon became a regular act. In his 2006 show at the Edinburgh Festival, the character was dropped in all but name for a confessional stand-up show called "Out of Character."

In 2007 Boldsworth began presenting the Chortle-hosted Ray Peacock Podcast alongside fellow comedian Ed Gamble and former EastEnders actor Raji James. It was succeeded by The Peacock and Gamble Podcast. Launched on 8 June 2009 and released on Mondays, the show was a comedic insight in the lives and experiences of Peacock and Gamble. Kings Place in London hosted a live version of the show in December 2009 featuring Nick Mohammed in supporting roles. The shows were also notable for their live Twitter take-overs, where Ray and Ed would hack into an audience member's account during the interval. A limited Edinburgh run took place every Sunday of the 2011 Fringe. The Peacock and Gamble Podcast ended with a live episode at Kings Place on 8 December 2011. It returned for daily episodes at the 2012 and 2013 Edinburgh Festivals with a different special guest each day.

Peacock and Gamble also fronted the Emergency Broadcast show at the Fringe in 2011. This show had the concept that a "real" show has been halted so Ray and Ed must fill time. Early examples featured a seance, a guide to world culture, a re-creation of the Stanford prison experiment, a tribute to Sister Act and live Guitar Hero. In 2013, the BBC commissioned a pilot of Emergency Broadcast for BBC Radio 4.

Between 2015 and 2018, Boldsworth made a three-season podcast called The ParaPod with comedian Barry Dodds. Boldsworth and Dodds would explore and debunk conspiracy theories and reports of paranormal activity. He also presented a mental health-themed podcast, The Mental Podcast, for which he won the 2017 Digital Champion award from Mind.

In April 2018 Boldsworth announced the upcoming release of The Parapod Movie in which he and Dodds would travel the UK in a hearse with Dodds attempting to convince Boldsworth of the existence of ghosts. It was the first ever podcast to become a movie.

In September 2013, Boldsworth hosted a three-hour radio show on BBC Radio 4 Extra dedicated to comedy icon Les Dawson.

As an actor he has appeared on Doctor Who, Red Dwarf and Skins.

Boldsworth retired from live comedy in 2017 and much of his work now takes place on Patreon.

== Awards ==
- Internet Award (nominated) – Chortle Awards 2011, 2013, 2016, 2017
- Best Compere (nominated) – Chortle Awards 2012, 2014
- Best Online Comedy (winner) – Midlands Comedy Awards 2016
- Best Podcast (nominated) – Ockham Awards 2017
- Digital Champion (winner) – Mind Mental Health Awards 2017
