= Nottingham Comedy Festival =

Nottingham Comedy Festival is an annual festival held in Nottingham, England, each November. It started in 2009 with 50 acts in 10 venues over nine days and each year continues to grow but continues to organise the festival and other NCF events along with a small group of volunteers,

The festival aims to bring together a variety of comedy events and give both new and established comedians the chance to perform. There are a variety of comedy events from stand-up, sketch, improvisation to films and poetry and more. The Glee Club, Funhouse Comedy, Royal Centre and local promoters all join with NCF to make the festival happen. The festival's main sponsor is the Castle Rock Brewery. Over the past few years, the comedy festival have been supporting the National Autistic Society.

== NCF Comedy ==
The Nottingham Comedy Festival is organised by NCF Comedy. After the 1st festival NCF went on to organise regular comedy nights around Nottinghamshire and the Midlands

One of the shows is the £1 Comedy Night, a comedy night that takes place twice a month at the Canalhouse in Nottingham and gives new acts a platform to perform and established comedians an opportunity to try out new material.

Awards: Best Open Mic Night at the 2016 Midlands Comedy Awards and Best East Midlands Open Mic Night at the 2015 Midlands Comedy Awards.
