= Cavana =

Shelter for boats common in Venice, Italy

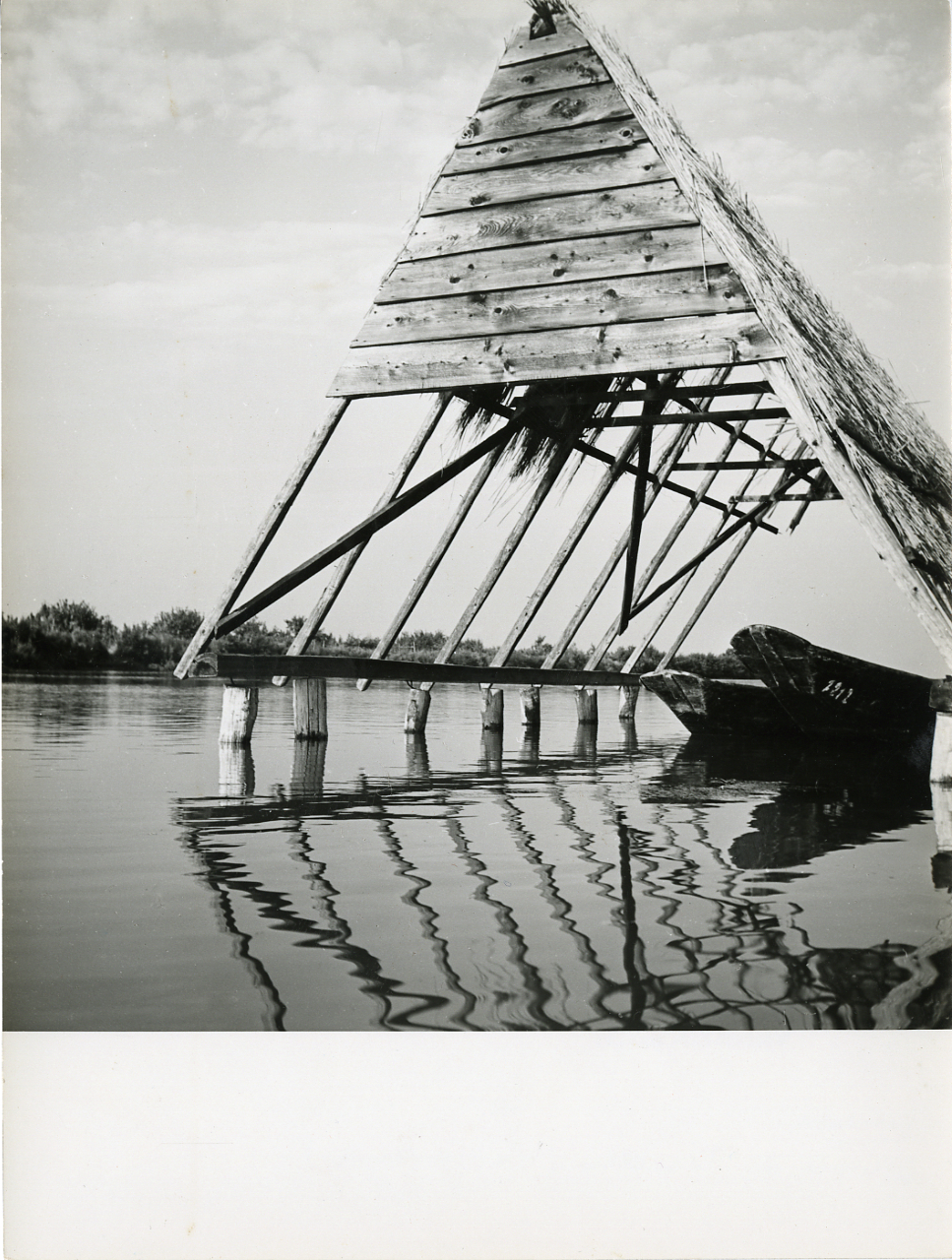
A traditional wood-and-straw cavana in the Venetian Lagoon photographed by Paolo Monti in 1955.

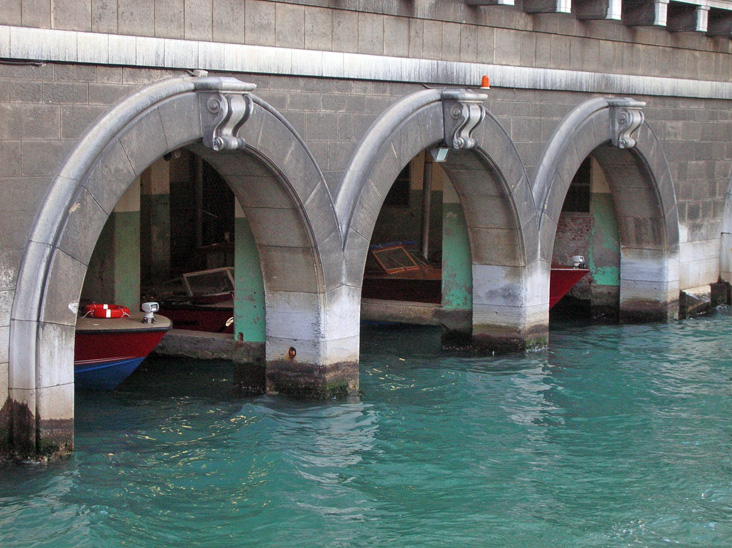
Cavana for the fire brigade service on the river Novo

A cavana is a covered shelter for boats. They are typical of the city and lagoon of Venice.

The word is thought to come from the Italian word 'capanna' meaning hut: the oldest depictions are represented as shelters covered with straw-like huts. Over time, shelters of this kind were also made in the body of buildings, palaces or usually used for storage, on the side facing a small river.
