= The Glee Club =

Chain of independent live stand-up comedy and live music venues in the UK

- The Glee Club logo
- Location: United Kingdom: Birmingham; Cardiff; Oxford; Nottingham; Glasgow; Leeds
- Owner: Comic Enterprises Ltd.
- Seating type: Theatre style
- Capacity: Birmingham: 400 (Main Room), 150 (Studio Room); Cardiff: 450; Oxford: 140; Nottingham: 400 (Main Room), 200 (Studio Room); Glasgow: circa 350 (seated), 600 (standing)
- Type: Comedy club, music venue
- Events: comedy, music, spoken word

Construction
- Opened: Birmingham: 1994; Cardiff: 2001; Oxford: 2010; Nottingham: 2010; Glasgow: 2019; Leeds: 2025

Website
- www.glee.co.uk

The Glee Club is a chain of independent live stand-up comedy and live music venues in the UK. The first Glee Club was opened by Mark Tughan in Birmingham's Chinese Quarter in 1994, the first dedicated comedy club to open in the United Kingdom outside London.

A second branch opened in Cardiff in 2001 with a third club opening in Oxford in April 2010 and a fourth, two room club debuted in Nottingham in September 2010.

Glasgow followed in February 2019, with Leeds becoming the latest club to come online in March 2025.

A number of major names cut their teeth playing at The Glee, including Jack Dee, Peter Kay, Lee Mack and Ross Noble.

The brand has been directly involved with numerous urban comedy festivals in their host cities, and also presented stand-up stages at major outdoor events, including V Festival from 2012-2017. The Glee Club Comedy Tent at V welcomed appearances from Sean Lock (V2012), Eddie Izzard and Josh Widdicombe (V2013), Alan Carr (V2014), Frankie Boyle and Russell Kane (V2016), and Joe Lycett (V2017).

== Comedy show ==
The Glee's regular comedy show consists of three acts from the UK and international comedy circuits introduced by a compère. The Saturday shows are often followed by a disco in some venues. All clubs also host tour shows by more established acts. Unlike many other comedy clubs, the seating for all comedy gigs is arranged in a theatre style and the clubs' bars close during the performances.

Professional comedians enjoy appearing at the clubs; as Tom Allen reported: "The Glee Club people are excellent at creating an environment where people can enjoy themselves. There's a science to getting the venue and night out right and they are great at attention to detail, everything from the welcome at the door to getting the lighting right. In the past comedy could be quite a macho environment and the Glee Clubs have been great at tackling that and making sure their bills feature diverse performers."

Many professional acts also opt to play secret or low-key tour warm-up shows at The Glee. Among those who've previewed largescale theatre and arena shows, and test out new material, are John Bishop, Lee Evans, Michael McIntyre, Sarah Millican and Jack Whitehall.

== Live music ==
The Glee Clubs have presented live music since April 2001, and presently host gigs in Birmingham, Nottingham, Cardiff and Glasgow. Among the acts who have appeared include Adele and Mumford and Sons. Music was initially brought to the Glee Club by promoter Markus Sargeant.

== The Glee Birmingham ==
Situated in Southside, Birmingham, The Glee's original home opened in leisure development The Arcadian on 10 September 1994, and was the first dedicated comedy club to open in the UK outside London.

The 20th anniversary show, in 2014, was compered by Ross Noble.

The venue is home to several unique nights including Comedy Carousel and Rough Works. Hosted and created by comedian Andy Robinson, Comedy Carousel has won several awards including multiple What's On Readers' Awards for Best Comedy Club Night and a Chortle Award for Best Comedy Club Show 2015, while actress and comedian Jo Enight's Rough Works provides a platform for new and established acts try out new material. Also taking place at the club is The Birmingham Comedy Festival Breaking Talent Award, which recognises new and emerging talent from the West Midlands.

Many local comics have graced the Glee's stage, including Jasper Carrott, Joe Lycett, Lenny Henry and Guz Khan.

== The Glee Cardiff ==
A second branch opened in Cardiff in 2001 and is located in the Mermaid Quay development in Cardiff Bay. The opening night line-up included Mark Lamarr and was "an instant hit" with audiences.

The venue has a seated capacity of 440 and a standing capacity of 600. ITV Wales broadcast a series of eight stand up shows from the venue in 2006.

It won the Chortle Award for Best Venue (Wales and West) 10 times between 2002-2017.

== The Glee Oxford ==
The third Glee Club opened in Hythe Bridge Street, Oxford in April 2010 with a one-off appearance from Shappi Khorsandi and Angelos Epithemiou, and went on to host appearances from Sarah Millican, Russell Kane, Ross Noble and Jack Whitehall.

Due to redevelopment of the area, the club relocated to The Bullingdon in Cowley Road, Oxford, on 14 January 2017. Appearing on opening night were Tom Allen and Ellie Taylor. Tom described appearing as "a big honour."

== The Glee Nottingham ==
A fourth, two room club debuted in Nottingham on 15 September 2010.

Situated in the British Waterways Building, on The Waterfront development, the venue programmes comedy, music and special events. Hollywood actor and Academy Award winner Tim Robbins and his Rogues Gallery Band was the venue's first music show, while a pre-fame Jake Bugg had a residency here in 2011,.

The club also hosts regular cabaret and burlesque nights hosted by The Gilded Merkin.

== The Glee Glasgow ==
The Glee Club Glasgow opened on 1 February 2019 in Renfrew Street, and featured a rare club appearance by Sean Lock, plus Gary Little, Geoff Norcott and MC Jay Lafferty.

The club was planned for several years, and is open for regular mixed bill comedy nights on Fridays and Saturdays, with touring shows at other times.

A mural in the entrance/ bar area depicts Scottish comedians Kevin Bridges, Billy Connolly and Frankie Boyle by local artist Michael Scott.

== Awards ==
- Chortle Awards 2002: Best Venue - Midlands Runner-Up (Birmingham); West/Wales Winner (Cardiff)
- Chortle Awards 2003: Best Venue West/Wales (Cardiff)
- Chortle Awards 2004: Best Venue East/West Midlands (Birmingham)
- Chortle Awards 2005: Best Venue West/Wales (Cardiff)
- Chortle Awards 2006: Best Venue West/Wales (Cardiff)
- Chortle Awards 2007: Best Venue West/Wales (Cardiff)
- Chortle Awards 2008: Best Venue West/Wales (Cardiff)
- Chortle Awards 2009: Best Venue Midlands/East (Birmingham); West/Wales (Cardiff)
- Chortle Awards 2010: Best Venue Midlands/East (Birmingham)
- Chortle Awards 2011: Best Venue Midlands/East (Birmingham); West/Wales (Cardiff)
- Chortle Awards 2012: Best Venue Midlands/East (Birmingham)
- Chortle Awards 2013: Best Venue Midlands/East (Birmingham)
- Midlands Comedy Awards 2014: Best Comedy Club - Runner-up
- Chortle Awards 2014: Best Venue Midlands/East (Birmingham); West/Wales (Cardiff)
- Chortle Awards 2015: Best Club Night Midlands/East - Comedy Carousel (Birmingham); Best Venue Midlands/East (Birmingham)
- Midlands Comedy Awards 2016: Best Comedy Club - Runner-up
- Chortle Awards 2016: Best Venue Midlands/East (Birmingham)
- Midlands Comedy Awards 2017: Best Comedy Club
- Chortle Awards 2017: Best Venue Midlands/East (Birmingham); West/Wales Winner (Cardiff)
- What's On Readers' Awards 2017: Best Midlands Comedy Night - Comedy Carousel (Birmingham)
- Midlands Comedy Awards 2018: Best Comedy Club
- What's On Readers' Awards 2018: Best Midlands Comedy Night - Comedy Carousel (Birmingham)
- Chortle Awards 2019: Best Venue Midlands (Birmingham); Wales and The West Winner (Cardiff)
- What's On Readers' Awards 2019: Best Midlands Comedy Night - Comedy Carousel (Birmingham)
- Midlands Comedy Awards 2019: Best Comedy Club
- Chortle Awards 2020: Best Venue Midlands & East Winner (Birmingham); Best Venue Wales Winner (Cardiff)
- What's On Readers' Awards 2020: Best Midlands Comedy Night - Comedy Carousel (Birmingham)
- Midlands Comedy Awards 2022: Best Comedy Club (Birmingham)
- Chortle Awards 2023: Best Venue Midlands, West and Wales (Birmingham & Cardiff)
- Chortle Awards 2025: Best Venue Midlands & East, Wales and the West (Birmingham & Cardiff)
