= The Peacock and Gamble Podcast =

British comedy podcast

- Genre: Comedy

Cast and voices
- Hosted by: Ray Peacock and Ed Gamble.

Publication
- No. of episodes: 128
- Original release: 2007 (Ray Peacock Podcast - predecessor); 2009 (actual podcast) – 2013

The Peacock and Gamble Podcast was a weekly podcast hosted by British comedians Ray Peacock and Ed Gamble. Hosted on Chortle.co.uk and accessible via iTunes and RSS, the show started in 2009 as a spiritual sequel to the Ray Peacock Podcast. A live show spawned from the podcast, the Peacock and Gamble Emergency Broadcast, which was performed at the Edinburgh Fringe as part of a tour. They also performed a live show in the winter of 2009, which has not been released for download. The podcast is well-acclaimed, having been nominated for numerous Chortle awards.

== Podcast history ==
=== The Ray Peacock Podcast ===
Ray Peacock (real name Ian Boldsworth) met Ed Gamble at a revue at Durham University. Their first podcast work together was the Ray Peacock Podcast, which was co-hosted with "Little Raji James who used to be in EastEnders but ruined it" - Peacock's actor friend, Raji James. Ed Gamble first joined the cast in episode 4 of the first series, and became a permanent host from series 2 onwards. Raji's role in the show was mainly as the butt of the jokes, with features such as "Raji's Autobiography" and "Letters for Raji" being written by Peacock and Gamble on his behalf, exaggerating traits such as his poor grammar and his floundering career. The Ray Peacock Podcast was successful, spawning live shows (attended by special guests such as Harry Hill and The Office actor Ewen MacIntosh), but ended after four series, as the presenters felt they were spending too much time making fun of Raji.

Only forty-nine episodes of the Ray Peacock Podcast were recorded in its original run, and only forty-eight of them were released. However, a final fiftieth show was recorded in September 2010, and released in conjunction with the fiftieth episode of Peacock and Gamble.

=== Peacock and Gamble Podcast ===
The first episode of the Peacock and Gamble Podcast was released in the spring of 2009, a brand new show following in the wake of The Ray Peacock Podcast. No longer presented by Raji James, the show was slightly more freeform than the previous podcast, with fewer recurring features - the humour being more autobiographical and anecdotal than its predecessor. The podcast was released weekly on Tuesdays, through Chortle.co.uk. The Peacock and Gamble Podcast featured more fan interaction than the Ray Peacock Podcast before it, with many features - such as "Fan of the Week" - being based around the show's official Facebook group, or since the website went live the Peacock and Gamble Forum.

The show was devised in part by agent James Taylor, who suggested that Peacock and Gamble should establish an online presence in connection with a television show they were then writing. The television programme was occasionally mentioned in the show, which then progressed to the pilot stage. The pilot was shown to test audiences at the Peacock and Gamble Emergency Broadcast.

== Features / sections ==
=== Complaint Letters ===
The complaint letters feature was a double-headed feature produced by both presenters. The concept was that they would send complaint letters to big businesses in order to trick them into giving them free merchandise as compensation, the joke being that the complaints were incredibly unrealistic and often badly-written. The complaints would invariably report the mishaps befalling an eight-year-old boy Fraser, the letters written from the perspective of his mother, Mrs. Fraser. Although some details of the letters were inconsistent - with Mrs. Fraser's husband's backstory in particular changing from week to week - Fraser's maladies remained remarkably constant with ailments from previous weeks being insistently referenced. At the beginning of the show's run, Fraser was a perfectly healthy - if somewhat dim - child, but by the feature's end he was terminally ill and the character was officially killed off at the 2009 live shows.

=== Ed's Amazing Births ===
This feature, ostensibly a celebration of the miracle of birth, was hosted by Ed Gamble throughout much of 2010. Ed would research interesting births - usually urban legends or children with tragic deformities - and report them back to Peacock, who would usually criticise Gamble for believing some of the more ridiculous ones to be true, or for referring to some of the more tragic ones as "amazing." Peacock would also bemoan Gamble's lack of research, and it eventually became apparent that Gamble tended to simply type non-sequiturs into Google and report back if he found any relevant results. This method did however often result in stories that were actually true, such as the one about a baby being born on a train in India and falling onto the tracks through the toilet.

The presenters have claimed that Ed's Amazing Births is one of the most complained-about features, following an episode where Gamble failed to thoroughly research a story, which he read out without realising that the story was remorselessly tragic, if not harrowing.

=== Ed's Amazing Deaths ===
A sequel to Ed's Amazing Births, this feature was based around user generated content. Rather than using Google, Gamble appealed for users of the Peacock and Gamble Forum to recount deaths that had happened to their own families and friends. People did respond to the appeal, but Peacock contended that many of the users were probably inventing deaths in order to get mentioned on the podcast.

=== Ray Says a Food (or Drink) ===
In early incarnations of the feature, Peacock would suggest a "forgotten food" that the listener may not have recently eaten, such as pickled eggs and beef jerky, in order to encourage them to eat it again. However, as the feature continued, the concept wandered a little. By episode 40, Peacock would embark upon a two-minute soliloquy, ranting about increasingly mundane foods and suggesting that the listener eat them in bizarre, improbable ways - imploring the listener, for instance, to travel to Egypt and eat a Cadbury Boost on a sphinx. For the last few episodes of the feature's run, the "foods" that Peacock suggested were no longer even edible - rather, he would ramble for two minutes, asking the listener to eat tractors or ghosts, or abstract concepts such as physics and religion.

=== Other features ===
Gamble ran a short-lived feature called "Ed's Film Pitches", whereby he would pitch pre-written film ideas to Peacock. These would generally be nonsensical in nature, but purport to deal with significant issues. One such pitch was Hangnail - a CGI film about hangnails. This led to a similar feature in which Gamble attempts to summarise films that he either hasn't seen, or hasn't watched in a very long time. A recurring theme across both of these features is that he will usually cast Gabourey Sidibe in one of the roles, referring to her exclusively by the name "Precious from Precious." This would usually be a role that she is entirely unsuitable for.

Another, looser feature was dedicated to taking care of "business" - "Ray's Business Section" was mainly used to take care of general administration to do with the podcast, stemming both from the Facebook page and real life. This was composed of smaller sections, including "Fan of the Week" in which the two presenters would suggest names, and if someone with that name contacted them on Facebook they would be selected. This spawned "Fish of the Week" - a similar idea, seeking real people who had names relating to fish. Another subsection involved Peacock recounting a list of Facebook groups he'd joined in the past week. Another fan-based feature was PG Tips, in which Peacock and Gamble would deal out advice to problems sent in by listeners, regardless of their lack of credentials.

== Music ==
The podcast uses music donated by popular comedy-musicians the Tiger Lillies and Frank Sidebottom. The Tiger Lillies contributed "Gouge My Eyes Out", which is used as the show's theme tune, whereas "Vagina", "Maggots", and "Banging in the Nails" are used between sections. The closing theme is an instrumental version of Sidebottom's cover of The Smiths' "Panic". Sidebottom was a friend of the duo, and upon the occasion of his death, Peacock and Gamble dedicated a section of the podcast to the man's life, and ended the show with his cover of "Bohemian Rhapsody".

== Reception ==
The Peacock and Gamble Podcast, while not broadly acknowledged by the mass media, has been praised by critics. Hazel Davis of The Guardian listed the podcast first in a run-down of the top 10 comedy podcasts, describing it as "35 minutes of pure gold." It was nominated for a Chortle Award in 2011.
