= List of Josh episodes =

The following is a list of episodes of the British television sitcom Josh, which is about three young adults who share a flat in London. It began airing on BBC Three on 29 August 2014.

== Series overview ==
Series	Episodes	Originally released	
Series	Episodes	First released	Last released
Pilot		29 August 2014	
1	6	11 November 2015	16 December 2015
2	6	22 September 2016	27 October 2016
3	6	2 October 2017	6 November 2017

== Episodes ==
=== Pilot (2014) ===
No.	Title	Directed by	Written by	Original release date
1	"Pilot"	David Schneider	Tom Craine & Josh Widdicombe	29 August 2014
Heartbroken when his fiancée ends their relationship, Josh returns to his old flatshare with Owen and Kate. He looks for sympathy from his flatmates, but they are busy. Instead, he spends his time with their annoying, boring, lonely, intrusive, socially inept, stingy, middle-aged landlord Geoff.

=== Series 1 (2015) ===
No. overall	No. in season	Title	Directed by	Written by	Original release date
2	1	"Swimming and Kissing"	David Schneider	Tom Craine & Josh Widdicombe	11 November 2015
Josh and Owen are invited to a pool party in Berkshire by Phoebe, whom they were at university with. Josh initially does not want to go due to having not learned to swim because he has a chlorine allergy. He changes his mind because one of the attendees is a girl whom he wants to have sex with. At the party, he is unpopular due to refusing to go in the pool. Owen pushes him in, causing Josh's skin to turn red. Owen sets up Kate with his friend Simon. She and Simon arrive outside her block of flats at the end of their date. They agree to another date and then they kiss. Simon dislikes the kiss then texts her to tell her that he does not want to see her again, but does not give her a reason. She goes into her flat, where she is told by Owen and Josh that she was well-known at university for biting whilst kissing. Owen helps Kate improve her kissing technique, after which she goes on another date with Simon. Closing song: "96 Tears" by ? and the Mysterians
3	2	"Mum and Dad"	David Schneider	Tom Craine & Josh Widdicombe	18 November 2015
Josh meets Lily in a supermarket. She is a well-off, attractive and promiscuous girl whom he and Kate were at school with. Kate and Lily hate each other, so Josh does not bring Lily to the flat. Josh and Lily go on a date, then go back to her place where she lives with her father, who is a judge. He quickly takes a strong disliking towards Josh, and confronts Josh as he is about to go into her bedroom to have sex with her. Kate's mother Judith (Jennifer Saunders) is turning 50. She stays at the flat and annoys Kate by repeatedly boasting about Kate's elder sister. Geoff is attracted to Judith, but she is not interested in him and she instead strikes up a friendship with Owen. Kate wrongly suspects that they are having sex. Closing song: "Jungle Boogie" by Kool & the Gang
4	3	"Wedding and Waiting"	David Schneider	Tom Craine & Josh Widdicombe	25 November 2015
Josh and Owen go to Owen's cousin's wedding, thinking it will be an opportunity to get drunk for free. They are disappointed when they see that the only other guest is the bridesmaid (Celia Pacquola), and subsequently discover it to be a sham marriage. Josh and Owen intend to go to a darts match; Josh is annoyed when Owen takes the bridesmaid from the wedding instead of him. Kate is watching Don't Tell the Bride alone in the flat whilst waiting for her new phone to be delivered. The electricity cuts out. Closing song: "I Try" by Macy Gray
5	4	"Teabag and No Sympathy"	David Schneider	Tom Craine & Josh Widdicombe	2 December 2015
Josh's best friend Mike (James Acaster) breaks up with hostile girlfriend Martha, after which Josh expresses his dislike of her. When the couple reconcile and become engaged, Josh reluctantly apologises. Owen's annoying, overbearing, coarse friend Teabag stays for the weekend. Kate tries to persuade Geoff to redecorate her room. He reluctantly does so, but Kate is horrified when she sees that he has made the room look much worse. Closing song: "This Charming Man" by The Smiths
6	5	"Homme and Away"	David Schneider	Tom Craine & Josh Widdicombe	9 December 2015
Geoff is renting Josh, Owen and Kate's flat to two Dutch models who are visiting for London Fashion Week. The flatmates are forced by Geoff to spend a few days at his cottage in Clacton-on-Sea. Geoff is very disappointed to find out that the models are men, so he joins the flatmates at the cottage. Geoff introduces the flatmates to his nephew Kevin. Josh tries to avoid being in a Chuckle Brothers' show. Closing song: "Beyond The Sea" by Frank Sinatra
7	6	"Suited and Booted"	David Schneider	Tom Craine & Josh Widdicombe	16 December 2015
It is Josh's birthday, so Kate and Owen organise a fancy dress party; Kate decides to implement a 'no sexy costumes' rule. Josh dislikes fancy dress parties, but agrees to it in the hope that it will give him a chance of beginning a relationship with Lucy, a pretty girl who lives upstairs. Josh invites Lucy; Owen invites Geoff. At the party, Kate's ex-boyfriend Tom arrives with his girlfriend Cath. Kate is annoyed by Cath's demands that she watch various YouTube videos on her phone. Geoff takes off his apple costume in order to get into the toilet. Kate orders Lucy to take off her black leotard cat costume and change into a costume that is not sexy. Lucy finds the apple and changes into it. Geoff, wearing the leotard, says that Lucy stole his costume. Lucy takes a disliking to Josh, then leaves early – still wearing the apple. Closing song: "Over and Over Again (Lost & Found)" by Clap Your Hands Say Yeah

=== Series 2 (2016) ===
No. overall	No. in season	Title	Directed by	Written by	Original release date
8	1	"Bed & Breakfast"	David Schneider	Tom Craine & Josh Widdicombe	22 September 2016
Josh is dumped by his girlfriend Gemma. Owen is in a relationship with Karen (Susannah Doyle), a cougar in her forties. Owen and Josh go on a double date with Karen and her friend Valerie (Tamzin Outhwaite). Josh wakes up in his bed with Valerie, but wants to end his fling with her and get back with Gemma. Kate makes a mistake when sending an email to Geoff. He is depressed, which Kate assumes is due to being insulted by her in the email. She takes him to the cinema, where they watch a French erotic film together. After arriving back home, he tells her that he does not know what she is talking about and that he has all emails from tenants sent to junk. He is unhappy because a woman whom he had a one-night stand with after meeting on a bus dumped him. Valerie, Karen and Owen arrive soon after Gemma does, then an argument ensues. Kate and Geoff walk in, when it is revealed that the woman whom Geoff met is Valerie. Geoff and Valerie leave together. Closing song: "Valerie" by Steve Winwood
9	2	"Share and Share Alike"	David Schneider	Tom Craine & Josh Widdicombe	29 September 2016
Josh, Owen and Kate go to a curry house, River of Spice, where they meet a young couple, Danny and Natalie, whom they used to know. The flatmates wrongly believe that the couple are in an open relationship because Kate had sex with Danny last year, after he told Kate that his relationship was open. They all eat at the same table, where Natalie sits next to Josh and touches him frequently. Geoff arrives alone and joins the group. Danny proposes to Natalie and she accepts. Natalie is horrified to find out from Geoff that Kate had sex with Danny. Natalie pours milk over Kate, then the couple leave, as does Geoff. Josh is left to pay the bill because Owen is in the toilet and Kate has not brought her purse. Emma Bunton walks in and leaves with Owen. Closing song: "Spice Up Your Life" by Spice Girls
10	3	"Cut & Dried"	David Schneider	Tom Craine & Josh Widdicombe	6 October 2016
Plymouth Argyle reach the final of the Football League Trophy Area Southern Section. Josh is a fan of the team and wants to watch the game, but Owen's cousin is staying at the flat, hogging the television with his Nintendo 64. Josh phones Geoff and the police to have Owen's cousin removed. Judith visits. She wants to break up with her hairdresser boyfriend, arranging for Kate to do so on her behalf at his salon. He reacts to that by deliberately making Kate's hair look awful. Closing song: "I Know Where It's At" by All Saints
11	4	"Sex and Politics"	David Schneider	Tom Craine & Josh Widdicombe	13 October 2016
Josh is asked out on a date by an attractive young woman, Amy (Laura Aikman), after an unsuccessful gig. This leaves the three trying to find the catch. They think she is a sex blogger, which makes Josh nervous on their next date. Josh tells her that he knows about her blog, but she tells him that she is not – and tells him to leave. Geoff has money problems and introduces Kate to building management, resulting in her being elected the new chairperson of the residents' association. Closing song: "Just a Little" by Liberty X
12	5	"Planks & Pranks"	David Schneider	Tom Craine & Josh Widdicombe	20 October 2016
Josh's biannual drink with his boring friend Pete leads to going on a two-day canal trip with him. Kate's friend Sophie comes to stay and reveals herself to be a relentless prankster.
13	6	"Close Up & Long Shot"	David Schneider	Tom Craine & Josh Widdicombe	27 October 2016
At a university reunion, Josh bumps into therapist Abby, who wrongly believes that he is infatuated with her. Kate meets an old lecturer of hers, Phillipa, to whom she falsely claims to have a successful photography career. She hires Kate to do a photo shoot of a Portuguese artist. Kate mistakes the cleaner for the artist. Closing song: "Sunchyme" by Dario G

=== Series 3 (2017) ===
No. overall	No. in season	Title	Directed by	Written by	Original release date
14	1	"Rope Swings & Roundabouts"	David Schneider	Tom Craine & Josh Widdicombe	2 October 2017
Josh's new girlfriend, Millie (Scarlett Alice Johnson), takes him to a Go Ape high-ropes course for a date. However, when Josh gets stuck on a zip wire, she dumps him and he goes viral on the Internet after people film him whilst he is stuck there. Landlord Geoff has been doing a night course in psychotherapy and can help Josh through this difficult time. Geoff takes Josh to the roof of the block of flats, where Geoff says that standing on the edge and shouting your problems will help. Josh does so, as Millie comes to collect her things from his flat. She phones the police, thinking that he is going to jump off. Someone films him and puts it on the Internet. Owen takes his driving test. The examiner, Huw, is initially unfriendly to him. However, Huw quickly warms to Owen when he discovers that they are both fans of Swansea City A.F.C. and from Carmarthen. They know some of the same people, but Huw takes a disliking to him and fails him when he finds out that his sister had sex with Owen and that Owen thinks she is 'loopy'. Kate and Judith go to an immersive theatre to take part in a play about a failing business, but mistakenly go to a nearby office.
15	2	"Fame & Fortune"	David Schneider	Tom Craine & Josh Widdicombe	9 October 2017
Josh goes on tour as support for a famous comedian. Josh dislikes him, because he is arrogant and patronising. Owen is a relationship with Diana Vickers. He tries to discourage her from taking part in Strictly Come Dancing, because he fears that she will leave him for one of the show's male professional dancers. When she is not chosen, he is pleased. That causes an argument between them and she ends their relationship. Kate and Geoff play 1980s board game Hungry Hungry Landlords. He does very badly and becomes upset, so she lets him win. He tells her that he faked that as a strategy to win.
16	3	"Bicycles & Babies"	David Schneider	Tom Craine & Josh Widdicombe	16 October 2017
Kate's friend Karen becomes a godmother to Karen's son Oscar. Kate is very soon exploited by Karen and her partner Neil as a free babysitter, saying that they have to frequently visit Neil's dying grandfather in hospital. Kate hires a teenage girl to babysit Oscar. Karen and Neil see Kate at the theatre whilst Kate is meant to be at their place looking after Oscar and the couple are meant to be at the hospital. They are angry with each other for lying, then decide to stay for the performance. The flatmates ban Geoff from the flat for frequently turning up there to do odd jobs. The plumbing goes wrong, so Owen and Josh bathe at the gym where Josh struggles to feel comfortable showering in the nude whilst around other men. Josh joins a spin class, where he does very badly. He becomes more unpopular after he fails to notice his new training buddy Ellie collapsing on her bike. For that, Josh's membership at the centre is revoked. Owen's membership is revoked for entering the women's changing room. The flat's lights stop working, so Josh phones Geoff to fix them. Closing song: "Bicycle Race" by Queen
17	4	"The Old Lady & the Swan"	David Schneider	Tom Craine & Josh Widdicombe	23 October 2017
Whilst working in a café, Owen is doing an impression of an Irishman. Lauren, an attractive young woman from New York walks in and assumes that to be his real voice. He keeps up his fake Irish accent and tells her that he is from Cork. When she introduces him to her friend Siobhan, who is from Cork, he struggles to keep up the pretence and leaves. Lauren buys tickets to Cork for her and him. Josh carries a package upstairs for an elderly neighbour, Violet. She then very frequently demands that he take in deliveries for her and bring them upstairs to her flat. She tells him that if he stops accepting and bringing her packages to her, she will stop him and his flatmates using her Wi-Fi by changing her password. He was unaware until then that they were using her Wi-Fi and he had been paying Owen for Wi-Fi, because Owen claimed it was his. Geoff takes an injured swan to his flat and nurses it back to health. After it attacks him, he puts it into a box, and delivers it to Violet. Closing song: "Runaway" by The Corrs
18	5	"Friends & Rivals"	David Schneider	Tom Craine & Josh Widdicombe	30 October 2017
Josh is playing his annual FIFA match online with his friend Stu, who is in Manchester. Geoff is very good at it, so Josh asks Geoff to take over his team. Owen hates his new colleague Brian – a lazy, dishonest sponger who turns up late and is obsessed with Eggheads. Owen sets Kate up on a date with Chris. She is disappointed when Chris tells her that he has a ten-year-old daughter, Lola. She is very manipulative and Kate has to compete with her. Closing song: "Three Lions" by The Lightning Seeds
19	6	"Stood Up & Sat Down"	David Schneider	Tom Craine & Josh Widdicombe	6 November 2017
Josh wants a night in watching Jonathan Creek with a pizza, but is interrupted by Kate who arrives home after a short date, and Owen who returns from a medical trial. Geoff tries to steal the furniture from the flat.
