= Cora Kirk =

English actress

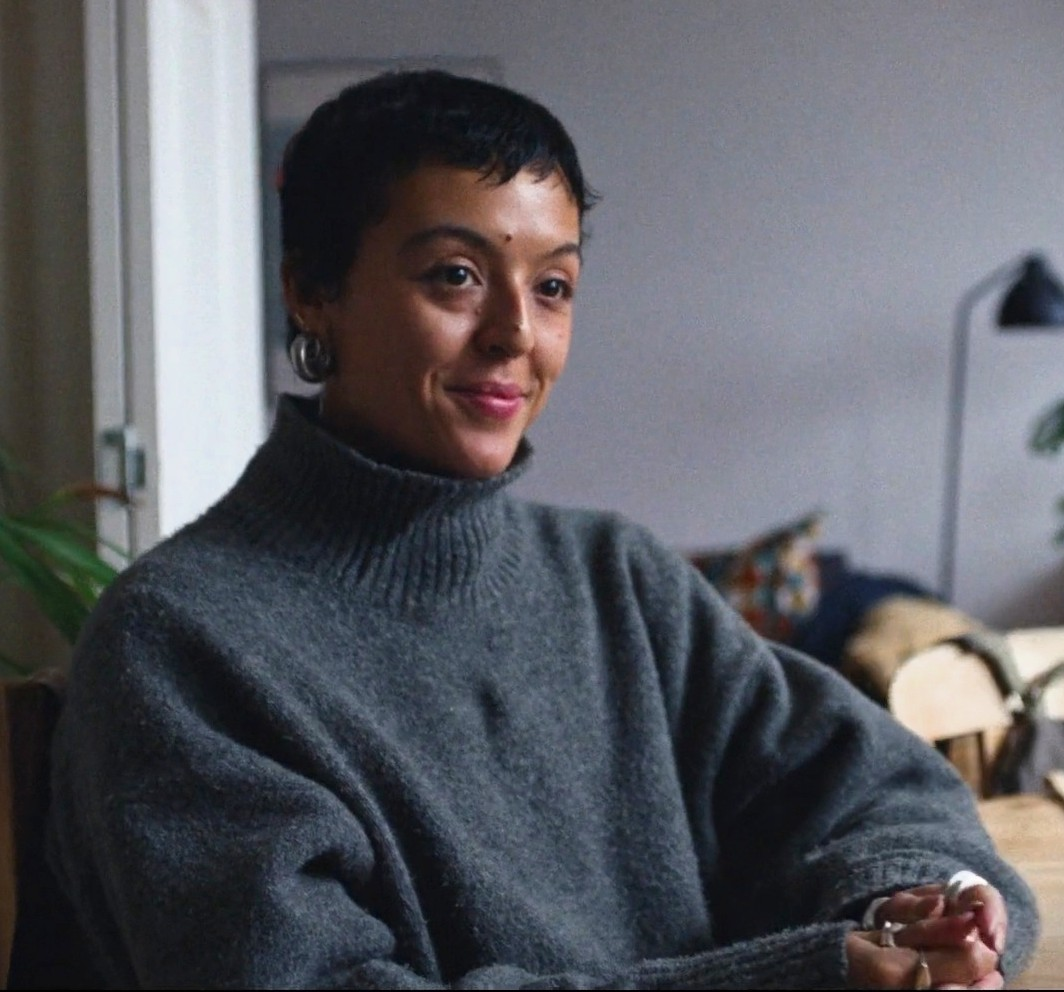
- Kirk in The Proudest Rose, 2026 short film
- Education: Royal Central School of Speech and Drama
- Occupation: Actress
- Notable work: Your Christmas or Mine?

Cora Kirk is a British stage and film actress. She starred in the film Your Christmas or Mine? (2022) and its sequel (2023). In 2026, she joined the cast of the BBC school drama series Waterloo Road as Leah Merchant.

== Early life ==
From Moorside in Oldham, Greater Manchester, Kirk attended the Waterhead Academy in her home town. She attended the Oldham Theatre Workshop, before she trained at the Royal Central School of Speech and Drama in London.

== Career ==
In 2017, Kirk played Lucy in a Sally Cookson stage adaptation of The Lion, The Witch and the Wardrobe in Leeds. She worked with Cookson again in 2020 on her adaptation of A Monster Calls, cast as Lily for a UK tour. She also played Wendy in an adaptation of Peter Pan at the Regent's Park Open Air Theatre in London. She also appeared in Peter Pan when Sally Cookson took an adaptation to the National Theatre.

In 2022, Kirk could be seen in the Daniel Stamm directed film Prey for the Devil. Kirk had a lead role playing Hayley, alongside Asa Butterfield, in the Tom Parry penned 2022 Christmas comedy film Your Christmas or Mine?, and the 2023 sequel Your Christmas or Mine 2.

In March 2023, she played Aalyah in Federico García Lorca’s The House of Bernarda Alba in Manchester. In 2026, it was announced that she had joined the cast of the BBC school drama series Waterloo Road as Leah Merchant, a newly qualified teacher. She will make her first on-screen appearance in its eighteenth series.

== Filmography ==
=== Film ===
Year	Title	Role	Notes
2018	Wishin' and Hopin'	Veronica	Short film
2020	Don't Water the Vine	Helen	Short film
2021	Tony	Malaya	Short film
2022	Prey for the Devil	Emilia	
2022	Your Christmas or Mine?	Hayley Taylor	
2023	After Everything	Freya	
2023	Your Christmas or Mine 2	Hayley Taylor	
2026	Finding Emily	Anna	

=== Television ===
Year	Title	Role	Notes
2014	Grantchester	Anita Carson	1 episode
2018	Doctors	Holly Plummer	Episode: "Out There"
2020	Bard from the Barn	Juliet	Episode: "Juliet"
2021	Doctors	Morgan Scott	Episode: "One Point Six Percent"
2022	Midsomer Murders	Etta Derby	Episode: "The Blacktrees Prophecy"
2023	Father Brown	Lila Tate	Episode: "The Hidden Man"
2023	Vera	Eliza Wilmore	Episode: "The Rising Tide"
2024	Grantchester	Feathers	Episode: "Series 9, Episode 1"
2024	Daddy Issues	Tamika	Episode: "Normal Men"
2026	Waterloo Road	Leah Merchant	Main role
