= Matthew Crosby =

English comedian and writer

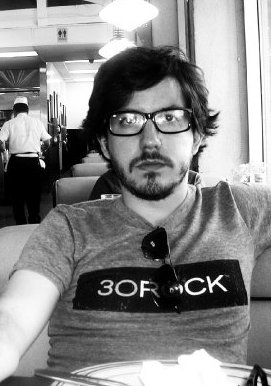
- Born: 12 February 1980 (age 46); Bromley, near London, England
- Children: 2

Comedy career
- Years active: 2004–present
- Medium: Stand-up, television, radio
- Genre: Observational comedy
- Website: matthewcrosby.tumblr.com

Matthew Crosby (born 12 February 1980) is an English comedian and writer.

== Early life ==
Matthew Crosby was born in Bromley, London. He attended St Olave's Grammar School., and went on to study English and American Literature with Film Studies at the University of Kent at Canterbury, where he met Tom Parry and Brendan Dodds.

== Career ==
Crosby was originally a teacher but left the profession to try comedy in 2004. He has since performed stand-up and sketch comedy all over the world, and was a semi-finalist for the BBC New Act 2005. He comperes at several comedy venues including the Horsebridge Comedy Club in Whitstable. Crosby is a founding member of sketch team Pappy's, formerly known as Pappy's Fun Club.

In August 2006 Crosby performed at the Edinburgh Festival Fringe in two shows: the Comedy Bucket, a stand-up showcase, and Pappy's Fun Club. In August 2007 the Edinburgh run of Pappy's Fun Club was nominated for an if.comedy award, formerly known as the Perrier award. Crosby performed stand-up as part of the Leicester Comedy Festival in 2007 and 2008. He also performed during the Melbourne International Comedy Festival in 2008.

As part of Pappy's Fun Club, Crosby returned to the Edinburgh Fringe with Funergy in 2008, World Record Attempt: 200 Sketches in an Hour in 2009, All Business in 2010, and Last Show Ever in 2012. Each show was followed by a tour of the UK.

Crosby was a regular contributor to comedy podcast Answer Me This!, playing various characters in jingles and sketches.

Crosby took his debut solo stand-up show, Adventure Party, to the Edinburgh Festival Fringe in 2011, where it received a number of 4* reviews.

Crosby is co-creator of the BBC Three sitcom Badults which ran for two series.

In 2015 Crosby took another solo hour show to Edinburgh called Smaller Than Life. The show notably included a semi-naked impression of Vladimir Putin. He co-devised and co-wrote the comedy panel show Hypothetical for UK TV channel Dave.

In June 2019, Crosby launched a new Sunday morning show on Radio X with fellow comedian, Ed Gamble.

In July 2026, Crosby, along with fellow Pappy's comedians Ben Clark and Tom Parry, was awarded an honorary Doctor of Arts from the University of Kent.

Crosby lives in Beckenham, which he asserts to be in Greater London, with his wife and two children.

== Television appearances ==
- Weekend At Alan's (1989)
- Meet the Parents – Channel 4 (2010)
- Trinny and Susannah – From Boom to Bust – Channel 4 (2010)
- Girl Friday – Channel 4
- TNT Show – Channel 4
- Ed and Oucho Transmission Impossible – BBC Two
- Winging It – BBC Two
- Comedy Cuts Series 3: Pappy's Fun Club Tough Gig – ITV2
- Comedy Lab: Pappy's Fun Club – Channel 4
- The Culture Show – BBC Two
- Ed and Oucho – CBBC
- Comedy Cuts – ITV 2
- Comedy Shuffle – BBC Three
- Malcolm in Space – BBC Two
- 8 Out of 10 Cats – Channel 4 (3 August 2011)
- Never Mind the Buzzcocks – BBC Two (21 November 2011)
- Hi Pals, I'm Up Next! – BBC One
- Animal Antics – BBC One
- Badults – BBC Three (2013)
- Great Movie Mistakes – BBC Three (December 2013)
- 8 Out of 10 Cats Does Countdown – Channel 4 (18 July 2014)
- Alan Davies: As Yet Untitled – Dave (February 2015)
- The Dog Ate My Homework – CBBC (2015–present)
- 8 Out of 10 Cats Does Countdown – Channel 4 (17 February 2017)
- Uncle – BBC Three (January 2017)
- Ready or Not - BBC One (March–April 2018)

== Radio ==
Until June 2026, Matthew co-hosted a Sunday morning show with Ed Gamble on Radio X, for which he had to commute all the way into London.

- Matt Forde Show – TalkSport
- Jon Richardson Show – BBC 6 Music
- MusicHappy Monday's – Pappy's Fun Club – BBC Radio 1
- Transatlantic with Andy Zaltzman – BBC Radio 4
- Switch with Annie Mac – BBC Radio 1
- Weekender – BBC Radio 2
- Official ALF Podcast
- The Sitcom Club – BOGGENSTROVIA PODCAST
- 28 Acts in 28 Minutes – BBC Radio 4
- Josh Widdicombe Show – XFM
- Woke Baker - Radio Unfrshbk6
- So Wrong It's Right – BBC Radio 4

== Writing ==
- The King Is Dead – BBC3
- World Wide Robert (Pilot) – Channel 4
- Dirty Sexy Funny (Series 2) – Comedy Central
- Five Hundred Rooms Of Cod - ITV4
- Ask Rhod Gilbert – BBC2
- The Big Ship – co-written with Stefan Golaszewski
- The Kevin Bishop Show (Series 1 and 2) – Channel 4
- TNT Show – Channel 4
- Rastamouse – CBeebies
- The Now Show – BBC Radio 4
- Hypothetical - Dave
- The Last Leg - Channel 4
- The Great British Bake Off - Channel 4
- The Traitors: Uncloaked — BBC2
