= Quickly Kevin, Will He Score? =

Football podcast

- Language: English

Cast and voices
- Hosted by: Josh Widdicombe Chris Scull Michael Marden

Publication
- Original release: 23 February 2017 – 27 May 2024

Related
- Website: www.quicklykevin.com

Quickly Kevin, Will He Score? is a nostalgia podcast based around association football in the 1990s. Guests have included former professional footballers, comedians, and sports television presenters.

Hosted by Josh Widdicombe with friends Michael Marden (a TV editor who has worked on programmes such as Would I Lie to You?) and Chris Scull, the podcast name derives from the commentary heard in Britain during the penalty shoot out between England and Argentina at the 1998 FIFA World Cup when Brian Moore asked Kevin Keegan how David Batty would fare with a decisive penalty, which Batty then subsequently missed (although the actual dialogue, which is used in the opening credits, is "Do you back him to score. Quickly: yes or no?").

The show was nominated for Best Sports Podcast at the 2018 British Podcast Awards, for which it received a bronze award. It was previously nominated for best sports podcast at the 2017 Football Supporters Federation Awards.

The show finished in May 2024 after a sold-out show at the London Palladium and 14 series in seven years.

== Episodes ==
- Doesn't include bonus correspondence or special episodes

Series	Episode 1	Episode 2	Episode 3	Episode 4	Episode 5	Episode 6	Episode 7	Episode 8	Episode 9	Episode 10	Episode 11	Episode 12
One	Matthew Le Tissier	Elis James	Paul Merson	Miles Jacobson	Tom Craine	Jim Rosenthal	Ian Pearce	Nish Kumar	Ivo Graham	Matt Forde	Iain Dowie	Quiz
Two	Frank Skinner	Darren Anderton	Dermot Gallagher	Tom Parry	Mark Lawrenson	James Acaster	Matt Lorenzo	Matt Forde	Tom Craine	Graeme Le Saux	Quiz	N/A
Three	James Richardson	Lee Dixon	Ivo Graham	Tony Dorigo	Elis James	Pat Nevin	Tom Parry	Quiz	N/A	N/A	N/A	N/A
Four	Bobby Gould	Alex Brooker	Gary Neville	Alastair Campbell	Stuart Pearce	Tom Craine	John Moncur	Quiz	N/A	N/A	N/A	N/A
Five	Ivo Graham	Dara Ó Briain	Alan Curbishley	Tom Davis	Darren Huckerby	Ben Partridge	Max Rushden	Quiz	N/A	N/A	N/A	N/A
Six	Steve Bull	Clive Tyldesley	Charlie Baker	Dave Beasant	Ben Clark	Jon Hare	Richard Shaw	Ben Partridge	Carlton Palmer	Quiz	N/A	N/A
Seven	Jamie Redknapp	Jason Manford	Ivo Graham	Neville Southall	Andy Townsend	Mike Ingham	Jamie Carragher	Bob Mills	John Robins	Henning Wehn	Quiz	N/A
Eight	Ramon Vega	Lloyd Griffith	Tom Craine	Ian Moore	Harry Redknapp	Suggs	Trevor Steven	Quiz	N/A	N/A	N/A	N/A
Nine	Phil Thompson	Caroline Barker	Ben Clark	Andreas Brehme	This Month in the 90s (September 1996)	This Month in the 90s (May 1995)	Nick Hancock	James Gill	Matt Forde	Quiz	N/A	N/A
Ten	Bryan Robson	Tony Adams	Joe Wilkinson	Jarlath Regan	This Month in the 90s (May 1997)	Susie McCabe	Paul Hawksbee	Quiz	N/A	N/A	N/A	N/A
Eleven	Peter Reid	Lee Sharpe	Geoff Norcott	James Brown	Dion Dublin	Maisie Adam	Thom Gibbs	Martin Tyler	Steve McManaman	Quiz	N/A	N/A
Twelve	Steve Claridge	Ben Partridge	Adrian Chiles	Rhys James	Dave Bassett	Jonathan Pearce	Ben Clark	Mark Hateley	Tony Pulis	Mark Watson	Quiz	N/A
Thirteen	Gary Lineker	Jason McAteer	Ben Clark & Tom Parry	Jan Åge Fjørtoft	Mick McCarthy	Pete Graves	David Earl	Matt Tiller	Brian Little	Les Ferdinand	Chris Coleman	Quiz
Fourteen	Glenn Hoddle	Barry Fry	Danny Baker	Steve Bruce	The End	N/A	N/A	N/A	N/A	N/A	N/A	N/A
