= Emergency with Angela Griffin =

- Genre: Documentary
- Presented by: Angela Griffin
- Country of origin: United Kingdom
- Original language: English
- No. of series: 2
- No. of episodes: 22

Production
- Running time: 60 minutes (inc. adverts)

Original release
- Network: Sky One
- Release: 4 May 2011 – 19 September 2012

Emergency with Angela Griffin is a British Sky One documentary show that aired in two series from 4 May 2011 to 19 September 2012. The show is presented by British actress Angela Griffin, who joined Ambulance Services up and down the country to experience and showcase the work of the Ambulance Service, not just frontline Ambulance crews such as paramedics, but also of Emergency Care Practitioners, Call Handlers, Dispatchers and Community First Responders.

Throughout the two series Griffin joined crews from West Midlands Ambulance Service, Welsh Ambulance Service, Scottish Ambulance Service, Devon Air Ambulance,
