= Your Christmas or Mine? =

British romantic comedy film

- Official release poster
- Directed by: Jim O'Hanlon
- Written by: Tom Parry
- Produced by: Kate Heggie
- Starring: Asa Butterfield; Cora Kirk; Daniel Mays; Angela Griffin; Harriet Walter; Alex Jennings
- Cinematography: Gavin Struthers
- Edited by: Charlie Fawcett
- Music by: Paul Saunderson
- Production company: Shiny Buttons Productions
- Distributed by: Amazon Prime
- Release date: 2 December 2022
- Running time: 95 minutes
- Country: United Kingdom
- Language: English

Your Christmas or Mine? is a 2022 British Christmas romantic comedy film directed by Jim O'Hanlon from a screenplay by Tom Parry. It stars Asa Butterfield and Cora Kirk as a couple who both try to surprise the other by showing up at their family Christmas before snowfall traps them with each other's family for the holiday. Daniel Mays, Angela Griffin, Harriet Walter, David Bradley, Natalie Gumede, Alex Jennings, Lucien Laviscount, and Ram John Holder also appear in supporting roles.

Filming of Your Christmas or Mine? took place in August 2021 in the London area and Buckinghamshire, including Pinewood Studios. Released on 2 December 2022, by Amazon Prime, critical reception towards the film was generally positive, although some argued that the film relied too heavily on familiar tropes. A sequel, Your Christmas or Mine 2, also based on a screenplay by Parry, directed by O'Hanlon and set in Austria was released on 8 December 2023 by Amazon MGM Studios.

== Plot ==
Young student couple James Hughes and Hayley Taylor both decide to surprise the other at Christmas only to have to accidentally experience Christmas with each other's families. Hayley ends up with James' upper class somber military father, Lord Humphrey, Earl of Gloucester, at his country house. James, in turn, ends up with Hayley's boisterous working-class family in the northern town of Macclesfield.

Hayley calls James and both urge each other to keep their relationship secret, as both have not told their parents about it. James' father Humphrey is also under the impression that his son is following the family tradition and is training at the Royal Military Academy Sandhurst, unaware he had secretly dropped out of to study drama ages ago. Hayley pretends to be James's fellow officer cadet but her cover is blown quickly when the suspicious Humphrey asks her a question to trip her up.

Both try to leave their respective partner's family's homes to go to their own, but all trains are cancelled due to bad weather conditions. They speak on the phone before returning to each other's houses, with Hayley complaining that James neglected to mention his nobility.

As the man of the house is to be out all morning, Hayley tries to reignite Christmas spirit in the manor by decorating it with ornaments and garlands she finds. Things go awry first when she accidentally lets out Humphrey's dog Peanut, who then is shot and injured by Jack, an elderly neighbour, upsetting Humphrey. When he sees the decorations, he is outraged to learn she found them in a room that was off limits to her, his deceased wife Fiona's study.

Meanwhile, James has a spa day with Hayley's female relatives until he meets Steve, who introduces himself as Hayley's fiancé, though he neglects to mention that he and Hayley broke up months ago, as he had not yet told her family. Roped into doing team games with the family, James is belittled and one-upped by Steve until he loses his temper. They get into a fight, during which he reveals that he is Hayley's new boyfriend and that she chose not to spend time with her family at Christmas this year, after which he angrily leaves.

James chastises Hayley over the phone for her family's and her ex's treatment of him, as well as for being forced to lie. Hayley leaves the manor and tries walking home in the snow but forgets her asthma medication. Humphrey confides to Iris that his behaviour in the last four years is due to missing Fiona, to which Iris points out that Hayley is very similar to her. Accompanied by Peanut, Humphrey finds Hayley collapsed in the snow and saves her. Hayley's father is relieved that she has broken up with Steve, whom he has always disliked. Her entire family decides to take James to his family, so that they are all reunited for Christmas. Hayley and James sort out their differences and reconcile, as do Humphrey and Jack, the latter of whom turns out to be Humphrey's father. As the two families have dinner at the Taylor house, Humphrey approves of James's decision to pursue drama.

== Cast ==
- Asa Butterfield as Hubert James Hughes
- Cora Kirk as Hayley Taylor
- Daniel Mays as Geoff Taylor, Hayley's father
- Angela Griffin as Kath Taylor, Hayley's mother
- Natalie Gumede as Kaye Taylor, Hayley's aunt and Kath's sister
- Harriet Walter as Iris, James's housekeeper
- David Bradley as Jack, James's grandfather and Humphrey's father
- Alex Jennings as Humphrey Hughes, James's father
- Lucien Laviscount as Steve, a lance corporal in the British Army and Hayley's ex-fiancé
- Ram John Holder as Anthony, Hayley's grandfather and Kath and Kaye's father
- Mark Heap as Johnson
- June Watson as Nan Gladys, Hayley's grandmother and Kath and Kaye's mother
- Aston Wray as Ant, Hayley's younger brother
- Harris Kiiza as Dec, Hayley's younger brother

== Production ==
Your Christmas or Mine? marked comedian Parry's debut screenplay. Produced by Kate Heggie at Shiny Buttons Productions. Filming took place in August 2021, primarily in the London area and Buckinghamshire. Locations included Marylebone Station in the London district of Marylebone, the suburb of High Wycombe, and Pinewood Studios in Iver Heath, where much of the interior footage was shot.

Kris Thykier and Andy Brereton served as executive producers on the project. Director Jim O'Hanlon described the screenplay as having "warmth, humour, and emotional honesty" and credited it with attracting the cast to the project. Butterfield also praised Parry's writing describing to The Times how "it captured the essence of a crazy family Christmas," and how when filming "a lot of it played out like a piece of theatre. Especially when we were shooting those scenes where everyone’s running around screaming. All those Christmas jokes and traditions, which we all have, but it’s rare to see that captured so organically."

== Music ==
The film score for Your Christmas or Mine? was provided by composer Paul Saunderson. In addition to his score, the film features cover versions of various popular Christmas songs, for which Prime Video enlisted a number of British musicians, including Sam Ryder, Maisie Peters, Ella Henderson, The Staves, Laura Mvula, and Birdy. The songs were released as the film's soundtrack on 11 November 2022 by Warner Music.

=== Soundtrack ===
No.	Title	Performer(s)	Length
1.	"Jingle Bells"	Sam Ryder	2:48
2.	"Together This Christmas"	Maisie Peters	3:14
3.	"Christmas (Baby Please Come Home)"	Ella Henderson	2:39
4.	"Rockin' Around the Christmas Tree"	Priya Ragu	2:08
5.	"I'll Be Home for Christmas"	Birdy; Skinny Living	2:46
6.	"What Christmas Means to Me"	BEKA	2:37
7.	"Purple Snowflakes"	Laura Mvula	3:10
8.	"Christmas Wish"	The Staves	3:23
9.	"Just a Lonely Christmas"	Jerub	2:25
10.	"Blue Christmas"	Gabe Coulter	2:09

== Release ==
The film was released on Amazon Prime Video on 2 December 2022.

== Reception ==
On the review aggregator website Rotten Tomatoes, 67% of 9 critics' reviews are positive, with an average rating of 5.7/10.

Decider's John Serba remarked that the film "doesn't reinvent the holiday rom-com. Not even close, actually. But it’s a perfectly amiable outing that generates enough warmth to warrant a watch, and it's probably a touch less annoying than your average Hallmark Xmas slop." Similarly, Jayne Nelson from Radio Times wrote that Your Christmas or Mine? "won't boggle you with unexpected plot twists, but it does contain all the essential Christmas-movie ingredients: lashings of warmth and humour, plus the potential for an occasional chin-wobble." She noted that that film's "biggest asset, however, is Cora Kirk, a convincing, charismatic and thoroughly likeable presence from her very first line." Simon Brew ofFilm Stories described Your Christmas or Mine? as a "comfortably familiar Christmas caper" praising "a sharp script, committed performances and a rootable central couple." He called the result "a really solidly made festive caper."

Gabriella Geisinger, writing for Digital Spy, found that Your Christmas or Mine "may not have the longevity of The Holiday or Love Actually, but it definitely fills a missing niche — a younger-skewed film that still takes its characters and their internal lives seriously [...] What helps Your Christmas or Mine over the line is its extended cast, who perform their roles with dedication that almost outpaces the movie itself." Filmink called Your Christmas or Mine? "unchallenging Christmas fluff" but found that it was "by no means a bad film. Competently directed by television journeyman, Jim O’Hanlon, you could do much worse. There is enough appeal, faux twists and gentle drama to keep you hooked for 90 minutes. It's easily digestible and it's a story that never overstays its welcome. But it's not enough to warrant a yearly rewatch, nor is it enough to claw its way out of the "It's Fine" category." Benjamin Lee in The Guardian described the film as "hackneyed grab-bag of sitcom clichés that ends up feeling more like tired pantomime," advising to "leave this one under the tree."

== Sequel ==
A sequel, Your Christmas or Mine 2, also based on a screenplay by Parry and directed by O'Hanlon, was filmed in Austria and London during 2023 and released on 8 December 2023 by Amazon MGM Studios.

== See also ==
- List of Christmas films
