= Rhea Norwood =

British actor (born 2001)

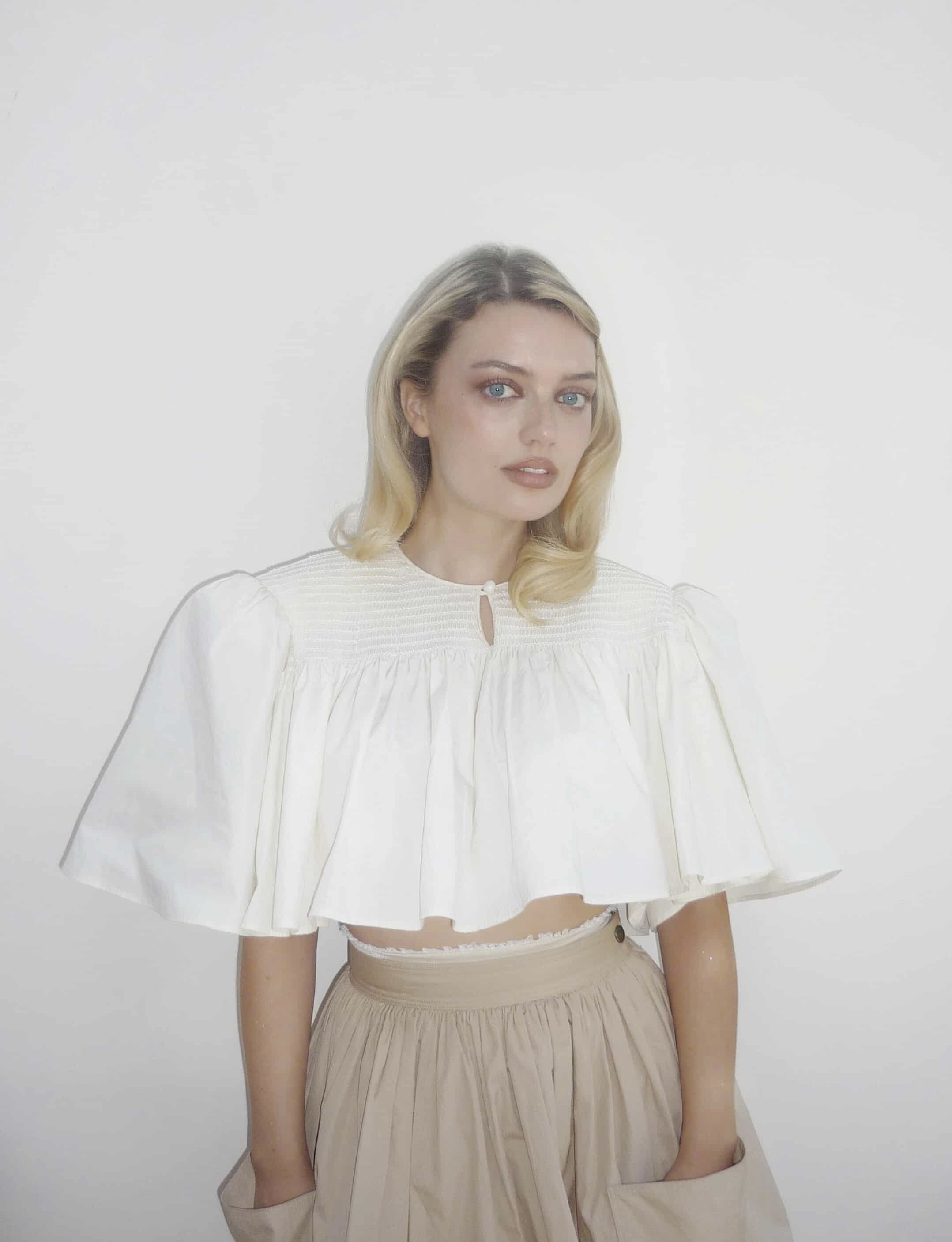
- Norwood in 2026
- Born: Rhea Margaret Norwood; 3 June 2001 (age 25); Kingston upon Thames, England
- Education: Bristol Old Vic Theatre School (BA)
- Occupation: Actor
- Years active: 2021–present

Rhea Margaret Norwood (born 3 June 2001) is an English actress. She is best known for her role as Imogen Heaney in the Netflix teen series Heartstopper (2022–2026) and her 2024 portrayal of Sally Bowles in the West End production of Cabaret.

== Early life and education ==
Rhea Norwood attended Hinchley Wood School and Esher College. Norwood was also a member of the Rose Youth Theatre in Kingston. Norwood graduated from Bristol Old Vic Theatre School in 2022 with a Bachelor of Arts in Professional Acting.

Norwood was diagnosed with Type 1 diabetes in 2022. She became a diabetes ambassador for the charity Breakthrough T1D in 2024.

== Career ==
In 2021, Norwood responded to an open casting for the Netflix teen series Heartstopper and was cast in the role of Imogen Heaney.

In 2022, Norwood was cast in the role of Alice in Channel 4's standalone drama Consent.

In 2023, Norwood landed the role of Bea in the Amazon Prime comedy sequel Your Christmas or Mine 2.

Norwood made her West End debut in June 2024 playing the role of Sally Bowles in Cabaret at the Playhouse Theatre, London.

Norwood plays Lydia Bennet in the 2026 Netflix production of Pride and Prejudice.

== Filmography ==
=== Film ===
Year	Title	Role	Notes
2022	Kill Them With Kindness	Aimee	Short film
2023	Your Christmas or Mine 2	Bea	
2026	Heartstopper Forever	Imogen Heaney	

=== Television ===
Year	Title	Role	Notes
2022–2024	Heartstopper	Imogen Heaney	Main role; 24 episodes
2023	Consent	Alice	
2026	Pride and Prejudice	Lydia Bennet	6 episodes
2026	Only Murders in the Building	TBA	Season 6

=== Theatre ===
Year	Title	Role	Venue	Ref.
2022	A Pigment of Your Imagination	Violet	Pleasance Theatre London	
2024	Cabaret	Sally Bowles	Playhouse Theatre	
2022	Jumpers	Dorothy	Hampstead Theatre	

=== Audio ===
Year	Title	Role	Notes
2026	A Pressing Engagement	Hester	Audible (service)
