= Josh (TV series) =

British TV series (2014–2017)

- Genre: Sitcom
- Created by: Josh Widdicombe
- Written by: Josh Widdicombe; Tom Craine
- Directed by: David Schneider
- Starring: Josh Widdicombe; Elis James; Beattie Edmondson; Jack Dee
- Country of origin: United Kingdom
- Original language: English
- No. of series: 3
- No. of episodes: 19 (list of episodes)

Production
- Executive producer: Stephen McCrumb
- Producer: Simon Mayhew-Archer
- Production location: London
- Running time: 25–28 minutes
- Production company: BBC

Original release
- Network: BBC Three / BBC One
- Release: 29 August 2014
- Release: 11 November 2015 – 6 November 2017

Josh is a British sitcom television series about three young adults who share a flat near Holloway Road in north London. The series was created by and stars comedian and namesake Josh Widdicombe. A pilot episode aired in 2014 as part of the BBC "Comedy Feeds", and a full six-episode series aired from 11 November to 16 December 2015 on BBC Three. A second series of Josh was released from 22 September 2016 on Three's then online-only channel. The day that the final episode of series two aired on BBC One, the BBC announced it had commissioned a third series, which was released on 2 October 2017.

== Characters ==
- Josh Widdicombe as Josh, a struggling stand-up comedian who gets stuck with bad luck
- Elis James as Owen, a Welsh lothario who works in a café
- Beattie Edmondson as Kate, a neurotic slacker
- Jack Dee as Geoff, the eccentric landlord to the three protagonists
- Jennifer Saunders as Judith, Kate's mother (also Edmondson's real-life mother)

== Series overview ==
Series	Episodes	Originally released	
Series	Episodes	First released	Last released
Pilot		29 August 2014	
1	6	11 November 2015	16 December 2015
2	6	22 September 2016	27 October 2016
3	6	2 October 2017	6 November 2017

== Critical reception ==
In their review of Josh, The Independent commented that there was "nothing original or remarkable about the set-up – or much of the script – but there's promising chemistry between its stars." They said that the main actors were far too old to be convincing 20-something university pals. However, they singled out Edmondson as "very watchable", saying her "comic timing stuck out".

The Arts Desk was scathing about the series, saying "It's horribly bland and it's difficult to see how Josh can avoid suffering the ignominy of lasting only one series".

The Guardian thought there was "a nice chemistry" between the three main characters and the series was funny "in a nice, cosy, safe, familial, familiar kind of way".

Chortle said "the comedy, which returns to BBC Three tomorrow despite a tepid critical response last year, is technically competent and adheres to all the rules of the genre: the scenes are tight and each line works towards a gag. But it’s also bland, lacking a strong personality or deeper purpose other than to deliver contrived lines. Nothing much has changed since the first series."

== DVD releases ==
A DVD set containing the episodes of the first series was released on 5 September 2016. A second series DVD set was made available on 31 October 2016. A third series DVD set was made available on 13 November 2017.
