= Angela and Friends =

- Presented by: Angela Griffin
- Country of origin: United Kingdom
- No. of seasons: 2
- No. of episodes: 180

Production
- Producer: Crackit Productions
- Running time: 90 minutes

Original release
- Network: Sky One
- Release: 9 November 2009 – 2 July 2010

Angela and Friends is a British talk show which was produced by Crackit Productions for Sky One. The show aired at 12 p.m., Monday to Friday, and was presented by actress Angela Griffin, who was joined by three "friends" in each show to discuss the latest news, celebrity gossip as well as other topical issues.

The show was the centrepiece of Sky One's first foray into daytime television and was originally commissioned for 90 episodes – 18 weeks – each of 90 minutes.

Viewers were encouraged to contact Angela and her "friends". They could do this by text, email, Facebook or Twitter. Griffin read out these messages during the show.

In March 2010, after the show finished for a two-week Easter break, it was announced that the series had been recommissioned for a second series, at the slightly later time of 2.30 p.m. on Monday, 12 April. The duration of the show was reduced to 60 minutes.

For the last six weeks of the second series, it was brought forward to the time of 12:00 p.m. The series ended on 2 July 2010.

== Friends and Experts ==
Three "friends" join Griffin on the sofa every week. Each friend has a topic that they will be discussing on the show. These friends include: Josie d'Arby, Sarah Cawood, Jeff Brazier, Jeremy Edwards, Zoe Salmon, Lisa Faulkner, Sara Cox, Amanda Lamb, Tara Newley and Marc Bannerman.

Angela and Friends also includes a group of experts who appear regularly on the show. The experts are:

- Sam Mann – Showbiz gossip expert
- Niki Wibrow – Fitness expert
- Dean Piper – Showbiz and Entertainment expert
- Chantal Denny-Harrow – Weight-loss expert
- Alexandra Heminsley – Book expert
- Dr Christian Jessen – Health and Medicine expert
- James King – Entertainment expert
- Toby Amies – Art and Photography expert
- Nathalie Eleni – Skincare expert
- Brix Smith-Start – Fashion expert
- Andrew Barton – Haircare expert

== Ratings ==
Angela and Friends premiered amid much publicity in the media, yet only managed to attract an audience figure of 35,000 viewers (or a 0.6% share) for its first episode. However, Griffin remained hopeful, stating that she would not read reviews of the show or worry over how many people viewers it attracts, stating "I'll cope by not reading any reviews. And if people don't watch, I'll go back to acting."
