= Consent (2023 British film) =

2023 British television drama film

- Genre: Drama
- Created by: Emma Dennis-Edwards
- Screenplay by: Emma Dennis-Edwards
- Directed by: Nadira Amrani
- Starring: Lashay Anderson; Tom Victor
- Original language: English

Production
- Executive producer: Aysha Rafaele
- Production location: Wales
- Running time: 50 minutes
- Production company: Firebird Pictures

Original release
- Network: Channel 4
- Release: 7 February 2023

Consent is a 2023 British television drama film set in an elite private school in England. It tells the story of a working-class Black girl who attends a previously all-male public school where misogyny is rife. She is raped while unconscious by one of the pupils and faces an uphill struggle for complaints to be taken seriously in the face of the power of the school and the boy's parents' wealth.

== Background ==
Whilst social media has proved to be an amazing tool for young people to express themselves socially and politically it must also take some of the responsibility for the misogyny and sexual harassment that has become almost commonplace in our schools. I'm incredibly proud to have authored this single drama for Channel 4, a broadcaster well-known for bold, boundary-breaking, hard-hitting television, and telling this story and acting in it alongside some of Britain's finest upcoming talent has been a pleasure and privilege.

— Emma Dennis-Edwards

Ofsted, wrote Anita Singh in The Telegraph, reported (Note: Specifically that "the June 2021 Ofsted report into sexual abuse in schools paints a picture of educational institutions in which abuse and harassment is so endemic that victims 'often don't see the point of challenging or reporting this harmful behaviour because it's seen as a normal experience".) how "sexual harassment is a normal part of school life", which she says "is the starting point for Consent". She says it was "inspired by true events", as recorded in "numerous testimonies" she encountered. According to Channel 4, the film attempts to demonstrate "what it feels like for young people in an environment where sexual expectations are distorted by the instant access to porn and where the lines of consent are minimised". Hundreds of hours of testimony from both private and state schools were used as evidence as to teen culture, and Dennis-Edwards later expressed herself "shocked" at the toxicity of the culture she encountered. Rafaele commented that while "school should be a safe, nurturing space", it was clear to her that very often the environment was toxic one.

== Cast ==
Natalie surrounded by the boys in the WhatsApp group; Archie is to the immediate right of her

=== Main ===
- Lashay Anderson as Natalie, a working-class Black teenager who attends private school via a scholarship
- Tom Victor as Archie, Natalie's boyfriend who is desperate to have sex with her to please his friends, despite Natalie not feeling ready.
- Rhea Norwood as Alice, Archie's spoiled twin sister and Natalie's best friend
- Ty Tennant as Raffy, the leading member of the boy's WhatsApp group
- Nell Barlow as Lily, Natalie's friend who is the only person to stand up for Natalie.
- Kimberley Nixon as Ms Parkinson, a good-natured but "ineffectual" teacher.
- Alex Heath as Kyle, a mature member of the WhatsApp group who provides Natalie with evidence
- Denzel Baidoo as Kojo, a member of the boys' group
- Dee Ahluwalia as Navjot, another member of the WhatsApp group

=== Additional ===
- Richard Harrington as the headmaster
- Geoffrey Streatfeild as Lawrence
- Elen Rhys as Fiona
- Matthew Doman as Rob
- Emma Dennis-Edwards as Sara
- Tonya Smith as Lisa

== Production ==
Channel 4 announced on 31 January 2023 that Rita Daniels, of the broadcaster's Drama Commissioning department, had commissioned the hour-long film from Firebird Pictures. Consent was written by first-time screen writer Emma Dennis-Edwards, directed by Nadira Amrani and executively produced by Aysha Rafaele. (Note: Dennis-Edwards' and Amrani's previous credits include Champion and Extraordinary respectively, while Rafaele earned a BAFTA award.) Burlingdale School scenes were filmed in Atlantic College, a Vale of Glamorgan boarding school near Cardiff. The capital was also the location for Natalie's house, while Archie and Alice's house was filmed in Penarth.

== Premise ==
The story is told from the point of view of Natalie, a working class girl who has recently joined a prestigious, upper-class public school on a scholarship. Until recently, the school was entirely a boys school; the admission of girls into the sixth form is a relatively recent development. Natalie encounters a strongly misogynist lad culture, and derogatory comments towards girls are an everyday occurrence. There is also a strong culture of watching and sharing porn among the boys. The WhatsApp group comments such as "Stick your dick in her mouth. Shut her up" are common and appear as actual characters when Archie gets a message; hence, in the scene where they all watch the same porn clip, all five appear on the sofa next to Archie and start masturbating, seemingly together. Natalie discovers what taking on an elite group means.

== Plot ==
Natalie is an intelligent and confident Black girl who attends Burlingdale School, an elite private school, on a scholarship. Natalie wins an award for her excellent debating skills and is named the debating club captain. Her best friend is Alice, the spoiled twin sister of Archie. Archie is a popular boy, part of a close-knit WhatsApp group, and characterises the college, being "rich, privileged and an academic high achiever". Nevertheless, Archie believes that he is not fitting in with this culture, as, for example, he sits on the bench during rugby practise and has never had sex. Archie has been dating Natalie for some time, however Natalie does not want to have sex yet. While taking their showers in the changing room, the other boys encourage Archie that he is owed "birthday sex". Archie's parents are divorced and his mother has remarried a younger man, who Archie loathes. Archie and Alice are celebrating their 18th birthday, and their mother and stepfather let them have a house party, leaving them alone for the night.

Alcohol and drugs are brought to the party, and Natalie has too much to drink but refuses drugs. Archie, however, snorts cocaine with Raffy. Raffy's girlfriend has just broken up with him due to Raffy sharing nude photos of her on social media. She threatens to report him to the police due to her being only 17 in the photos. Meanwhile, Archie takes a near-unconscious Natalie to his bedroom, where he films himself having sex with her; Natalie's eyes barely flicker.

The porn culture among Archie's WhatsApp group, combined with a philosophy that if it cannot be proven to have happened it did not happen — in Raffy's words, "no face, no case" — means that Archie films himself having sex with Natalie and shares it among the group. The next day, Natalie knows something is wrong but cannot recall specific events; she realises that Archie had sex with her, to which he claims she consented. Natalie is positive, however, that she was raped and complains to the school, and is supported by her Politics teacher Ms Parkinson. She loses the friendship of Alice, who sticks by her brother, and his parents call in their solicitors. The WhatsApp group deletes the video Archie sent them, intending to eradicate the evidence; however, one member, Kyle, leaves the group before they do so. Archie's parents threaten to sue the school for defamation in retaliation, and the headmaster allows Archie to stay on condition he read a leaflet from Alcoholics Anonymous. Defeated by the school's closed ranks, Natalie no longer feels comfortable at the school and leaves, realising that she cannot defeat the school, parents and pupils on her own.

Natalie believes that now she has dropped out of education before she has completed her A-Levels, she will be unable to go to university.

Sometime later, Archie wins an award in assembly for essay writing. As he is shaking the headmaster's hand, Kyle, in the front row, sees Archie is not sorry for raping Natalie and finds the video of Archie and Natalie, which he never deleted from his phone, and texts it to her, also saying "I'm sorry". She receives and watches it and realises this is the evidence she needed. The film closes with the audience hearing her call the police to report her rape.

== Reception ==
True responsibility for this state of affairs lies not with Lily, of course, nor even with Archie and his gleefully misogynistic mates, but with grownups like the school's headteacher who, typically, is much more interested in ensuring his pupils understand the meaning of “discretion” than the meaning of "consent".

— Ellen E. Jones, The Guardian

According to the marketing body for UK commercial television, Consent was watched by approximately 316,000 viewers at the time of broadcast, which combined with 83,000 VOSDAL viewers and 165,000 saving it for later made it the 34th most-watched Channel Four program of the week with 8.4% of their national audience.

Consent has been described by Anita Singh in The Telegraph as "required viewing" for UK schools, particularly teenagers, and in style and construction (Note: Singh comments "The set-up—sensitive rich boy, smart girl from a humble background—is straight out of the 1980s film Pretty in Pink, right down to the insufferable blond kid who dominates the group".) has been compared with John Hughes 1980 Brat Pack film, Pretty in Pink. Writing in Stylist magazine, Kayleigh Dray favourably compared the film's portrayal of its themes to such recent documentary pieces as Zara McDermott's 2021 Uncovering Rape Culture, which saw McDermott draw on her own experience of almost being raped. In The Guardian, Barbara Ellen drew connections with the broader Metoo movement and how it intersects with the ethics of consent and peer-pressure. The choice of casting the Archie character as the main protagonist was praised by Sophie McBain in the New Statesman, who suggested that had, for example, the film focussed on Raffy, it would have been far less powerful viewing.

The acting out of their WhatsApp messages by the characters was criticised by Singh, which she suggested was "stagey" and detracted from the film's authenticity, as also, she felt the use of actors older than those they were portraying. The online legal journal Lexology also criticised the film as while holding lofty ambitions to play a role in the fight against tox masculinity, it eventually realised itself as a lost opportunity. Matthew Hardcastle of law firm Kingsley Napley argues that, notwithstanding that the narrative was already flawed by its relatively short length, numerous legal matters were either misunderstood—that, for example, Natalie's accusations would only be taken seriously with backing evidence (Note: Hardcastle wrote, "victims of sexual assault do not require additional evidence other than their account of what happened ... A police investigation would have happened even without the video.")-omitted entirely, such as the fact that school-led investigations would usually be multi-agency led, or downplayed (for example, the role of social media was covered from the boys' perspective but would also have provided a forum for a backlash. Finally, Hardcastle argues, while we see Natalie make her report to the police, we then do not see the consequences on the numerous lives this would have gave impacted: "Perhaps the single biggest difference between Consent and real-life was the portrayal of certainty in circumstances where there often is none".

Soma Sara, who founded the anti-rape website, Everyone's Invited, welcomed the film's release, stating in Glamour magazine that she saw it as restarting an urgent discussion in UK schools. The film was described by Morgan Cormack in The Radio Times as "one of the most important watches" of the year, based mainly on its approach to themes such as porn culture, sexual harassment and misogyny, but also on how it suggested the inability or unwillingness of staff to recognise the extent of the issue. Ellen E. Jones, writing in The Guardian considered that, in Consent, "there is a lot that is timely about ... [it] and a lot that is horribly timeless". (Note: For example, Jones noted how the film touches on the contemporaneous case of Andrew Tate, but also how, historically, perpetrators have been protected by the powerful.) She also notes issues of race highlighted when, for example, Raffy—"his hair an apt shade of Slytherin blonde"—refers to the black, working-class Natalie as "trying to get Markled". She compared the film, in some of its issues, as akin to The Inbetweeners, but with a tragic aggressive rather than humorous, premise. A similar comparison was made by McBain, who—describing Raffy as "cartoonishly awful" (Note: Singh also calls Raffy "a particularly cartoonish character".)—compares him to The Inbetweeners' Jay Cartwright, had the latter "been born into the Andrew Tate generation". Jones highlights Victor's careful portrayal, almost simultaneously, as both "a confused, fearful child and a dangerously self-pitying man". Jones argues that, while the film appears to end on a positive note—with Natalie having both the courage and the evidence to report her rape:

Anyone who saw Lucy Kirkwood's astounding Maryland ... or Unbelievable, or who has followed, with horror, the trial of yet another Met police officer charged with rape, will not be so comforted.
