= Your Christmas or Mine 2 =

British romantic comedy film

- Official release poster
- Directed by: Jim O'Hanlon
- Written by: Tom Parry
- Produced by: Kate Heggie; Richard Webb
- Starring: Asa Butterfield; Cora Kirk; Daniel Mays; Angela Griffin; Alex Jennings; Jane Krakowski
- Cinematography: Stephan Pehrsson
- Edited by: Mark Thornton
- Music by: Paul Saunderson
- Production companies: Mighty Pebble Pictures; Shiny Button Productions; The Story Collective
- Distributed by: Amazon MGM Studios
- Release date: December 8, 2023
- Running time: 101 minutes
- Country: United Kingdom
- Language: English

Your Christmas or Mine 2 is a 2023 British Christmas romantic comedy film directed by Jim O'Hanlon from a screenplay by Tom Parry. It is a sequel to Your Christmas or Mine? (2022) and stars Asa Butterfield and Cora Kirk as a couple whose two families, after a mix-up with transport at Innsbruck Airport, end up at each other's holiday accommodation on different sides of a valley. Daniel Mays, Angela Griffin, David Bradley, Natalie Gumede, Alex Jennings, Jane Krakowski, and Rhea Norwood also appear in supporting roles.

Largely filmed in Tyrol in April and May 2023, Your Christmas or Mine 2 was released on 8 December 2023, by Amazon MGM Studios, after a screening event for fans, hosted by the cast and crew, was held in London the week before. The film earned largely lukewarm reviews from critics, with the performances of the cast being praised, though some critics felt that it was inferior to the original film.

== Plot ==
A year after the events of the previous film, James and Hayley are still a couple, so the Hughes and Taylor families arrange to spend Christmas in the Austrian Alps together. However, Hayley's dad doesn't want to be beholden to James's father, so insists on using alternative accommodation.

Their shuttles are mixed up at the airport and the working-class Taylors end up in the posh Hugheses' luxury resort, while the latter end up in the former's sparse hostel. As their bags do arrive to their correct places, Hayley finds an engagement ring in what she believes is James's luggage (actually his father's) and mistakenly assumes that James intends to propose. After a night having to put up with the mix-up, they are reunited at the resort. They all go skiing together, where the inexperienced Hayley has an accident while trying to keep up with and impress James's childhood friend Bea. As she's sent back down the mountain in the gondola, she watches jealously as they zip down the mountain together.

At the men's drunken night out, Hayley's father slips that Hayley expects James to propose, while during a spa day Diane slips to Hayley that he may attend an American film school in Los Angeles next year. Later that night, Hayley sees James practicing his proposal to Bea, and mistakenly assumes he is actually proposing to her. James catches up to Hayley and explains, proposing then and there. She rejects him as he's drunk so maybe isn't so sincere, and is convinced it was James's father who intended to propose to his American girlfriend Diane. Fearing she will never fit in with James's posh upbringing, she breaks up with him, leaving the hotel with her family.

The next morning, the Hugheses set out for the hostel to right things, but have already missed the Taylors. They hurry to the airport and stop the plane so James can make up with Hayley. The two families return to spend Christmas at the resort, where James's father tells him that the engagement ring (which belonged to his late mother) was never for Diane, but that he intended to pass it on to James for a future proposal to Hayley. Both he and Hayley open their Christmas presents. James includes a key to his apartment, alluding to a potential forever, whereas Hayley's card, written weeks ago, reveals that she wanted to propose to him all along, and James accepts.

== Cast ==
- Asa Butterfield as Hubert James Hughes
- Cora Kirk as Hayley Taylor
- Daniel Mays as Geoff Taylor
- Angela Griffin as Kath Taylor
- Natalie Gumede as Kaye Taylor
- Ram John Holder as Grandad
- David Bradley as Jack
- Alex Jennings as Humphrey Hughes
- Jane Krakowski as Diane
- Rhea Norwood as Bea
- Joseph Obasohan as Ant
- Harris Kiiza as Dee
- Karl Markovics as Rudolf
- Simon Hatzl as Gerhard
- Franz Xaver Zach as Josef

== Production ==
In March 2023, the British Comedy Guide disclosed that a sequel to Your Christmas or Mine? was set to start filming next month. Your Christmas or Mine 2 was produced for Prime Video by Mighty Pebble Pictures and The Story Collective. The screenplay was written by Tom Parry again, while direction was once more taken over by Jim O'Hanlon. Production was overseen by Richard Webb and Kate Heggie, with James De Frond, Kris Thykier, O'Hanlon, Parry, and Damian Keogh serving as executive producers.

While much of the core cast returned from the first film, Harriet Walter did not reprise her role of housekeeper Iris. New cast members included American actress Jane Krakowski, playing Humphrey's new girlfriend Diane, as well as Rhea Norwood as Bea, a hotel guest. Filming of Your Christmas or Mine 2 took largely place in Sölden, a municipality in the Ötztal valley of Tyrol, Austria, in April and May 2023. Shooting locations included Innsbruck Airport, a hay barn of a farmhouse near Heiligkreuz, the superior hotel Schöne Aussicht on the slopes of the Sölden-Hochsölden ski area as well as the slopes number 15, 19, and 20, accessed by the Rotkogelbahn. The opening scene of the film was shot at Stansted Airport.

== Music ==
Paul Saunderson returned to produce the score for Your Christmas or Mine 2. Apart from his original music, the film features cover versions of various popular Christmas songs, for which Prime Video enlisted a number of British musicians, including Sam Ryder, Anne-Marie, Conor Maynard, Alesha Dixon, and Hayley Sales. The songs were released as the film's soundtrack on 7 November 2023, by Warner Music. It was preceded by the release of two promotional singles, including "You're Christmas to Me" by Ryder and "Christmas Without You" by Anne-Marie, the former of which reached number two on the UK Singles Chart on 22 December 2023.

=== Soundtrack ===
No.	Title	Performer(s)	Length
1.	"You're Christmas to Me"	Sam Ryder	3:34
2.	"Christmas Without You"	Anne-Marie	2:08
3.	"Wrap Yourself in a Christmas Package"	Conor Maynard	2:35
4.	"Happy Holiday"	Alesha Dixon	2:14
5.	"Winter Wonderland"	BEKA	1:56
6.	"I Love the Winter Weather"	Jo Hill	2:39
7.	"I've Got My Love to Keep Me Warm"	Hayley Sales	2:46
8.	"Have Yourself a Merry Little Christmas"	Jerub	1:53
9.	"I'd Like You for Christmas"	Shiv	2:48
10.	"Merry Christmas Baby"	Solomon	2:25
11.	"Warm in December"	Abimaro	2:02

== Release ==
The cast and crew attended a special fan screening premiere event on 30 November 2023 at the Ham Yard Hotel in London, England. The film became available on Amazon Prime Video 8 December 2023.

== Reception ==
On the review aggregator website Rotten Tomatoes, 50% of 8 critics' reviews are positive, with an average rating of 4.8/10.

Decider's Raven Brunner felt that the film "is incredibly fun, and will instantly draw you in [...] With a sprinkle of mischief and heartbreak, Your Christmas or Mine 2 is a standout Christmas movie that doesn't sacrifice quality and storytelling for festival cheer. Hayley and James have an exciting romance that's brought to life through Butterfield and Kirk's genuine performances. The movie is sure to entertain viewers from all walks of life, even though the core romance centers on two youngins." Empire's Helen O'Hara found that the film "struggles to make an impact. The characters and cast who gave the first Your Christmas or Mine? such surprising charm are still present and correct, but the plot leans heavily on tropes collected from a million Christmas TV specials." She concluded that "the set-up is not as elegant as that of the first film, so this feels more forced and the humour more familiar. Still, the performances are winning and the setting appropriately seasonal, so it might do for the holidays."

Jayne Nelson from Radio Times wrote: "With almost every family member returning, an extra sprinkle of Hollywood glamour is provided by 30 Rock's Jane Krakowski as the new girlfriend of James's dad. However, despite the cast's energetic performances, there is little evidence of the first film's wit, and any laughs are pretty feeble at best. The plot bulges with even more clichés than the original, although the Austrian locations do at least offer up a smattering of real snow." Cath Clarke, writing for The Guardian, called the film a "forgettable festive sequel [that] has little to add." She found that "this chirpy romcom sequel from Prime Video has got the warm blanket familiarity you would get from a feature-length British telly Christmas special; something to put on while you fight over who gets the last Malteser in the Celebrations tub [...] The script is mostly tasteless, a buffet of blandness. Instantly forgettable."

== Future ==
Butterfield and Kirk have expressed their interest to reprise their roles in a third film.
