= Badults =

- The opening title sequence of Badults
- Genre: Sitcom
- Created by: Pappy's
- Written by: Pappy's
- Directed by: Ben Kellett (Series 1); Gordon Anderson (Series 2)
- Starring: Matthew Crosby; Ben Clark; Tom Parry; Emer Kenny
- Opening theme: The Spook School (Season 2)
- Country of origin: United Kingdom
- Original language: English
- No. of series: 2
- No. of episodes: 12

Production
- Executive producers: Rab Christie; Gavin Smith
- Producer: Izzy Mant
- Production locations: Glasgow, Scotland, U.K.
- Editor: Andrew Collins
- Running time: 30 mins
- Production company: The Comedy Unit

Original release
- Network: BBC Three
- Release: 23 July 2013 – 7 July 2014

Badults is a British sitcom series created and starring the members of Pappy's, along with Emer Kenny, Jack Docherty and Katherine Ryan in the lead roles. Written collectively by Pappy's, the first series piloted on 23 July 2013 on BBC Three. A second and final series was commissioned by the BBC on 23 August 2013 for broadcast in summer 2014.

== Plot ==
A series following the lives of some flatmates, Matthew, Ben, Tom and Rachel, who do their best to fulfill their age old ambition of living together as adults albeit badly and earning the label 'Badults' hence. Clark, Crosby and Parry play characters who share a flat but are "bad at being adults".

== Production ==
The series was developed under the working title The Secret Dude Society. Andrew Collins was Script Editor.

=== Filming ===
Series 1 was filmed at BBC Scotland in Glasgow in early 2013 where it was produced by The Comedy Unit. Series 2 began shooting in early 2014.

=== Cast ===
- Matthew Crosby as Matthew
- Ben Clark as Ben
- Tom Parry as Tom
- Emer Kenny as Rachel
- Katherine Ryan as Lucy
- Jack Docherty as Mr Carabine

== Reception ==
Bruce Dessau, comedy critic for the Evening Standard described the show as "really rather good" saying "they have simply crammed in as many gags as it is humanly possibly to cram into a half hour sitcom."

James Kettle of The Guardian said of the show, "From what I can see it's a triumph, harnessing classic comedy chops to a modern sensibility."

Iona McLaren of The Daily Telegraph regarded the series as a "failed transition" from the group's live comedy, although a reviewer from the Metro felt that any unfunny material was saved by the "sheer relentless energy" of the cast.

The second series was better received by critics than the first.

== Episodes ==
=== Series overview ===
Season	Episodes	Premiere	Finale	DVD Release
1	6	23 July 2013	27 August 2013	2 September 2013
2	6	2 June 2014	7 July 2014	TBA

=== Series 1 (2013) ===
#	Title	Writer	Director	Original release date	UK viewers (millions)
1	"Money"	Pappy's	Ben Kellett	23 July 2013	TBA
Matthew, Tom and Ben's game of Propertyopoly becomes all too real when they accidentally massively overdraw on their joint account.
2	"Food"	Pappy's	Ben Kellett	30 July 2013	TBA
Tom's cherry choc chowder is such a taste sensation he launches his own pop-up restaurant in the flat using suspect secret ingredients.
3	"Film"	Pappy's	Ben Kellett	6 August 2013	TBA
Bank heists or radioactive fish dinosaurs, which theme should Tom choose for his movie? Matthew tries to take his job more seriously.
4	"Girls"	Pappy's	Ben Kellett	13 August 2013	TBA
Tom, Ben and Matthew weave a complex web of deceit when three females turn up at the flat.
5	"Cool"	Pappy's	Ben Kellett	20 August 2013	TBA
Carabine wants his company to get back its cool and, with Rachel injured, it's up to Matthew to prove to his boss he's hip and happening. Ben is busy aligning his chakras, having stumbled on a meditation CD. Tom's ability to make a catchy tune on a remote control prompts him to record a dance track.
6	"Past"	Pappy's	Ben Kellett	27 August 2013	TBA
Tom, Ben and Rachel help Matthew remember what happened to a missing childhood toy, which could make them all very rich if it can be found.

=== Series 2 (2014) ===
#	Title	Writer	Director	Original release date	UK viewers (millions)
1	"Football"	Pappy's	Gordon Anderson	2 June 2014	TBA
Come on England! It's the big game and the Badults go to extraordinary lengths to see the match.
2	"Neighbours"	Pappy's	Gordon Anderson	9 June 2014	TBA
Sophisticated and stylish, the new neighbours are everything the boys aren't and Matthew pulls out all the stops to impress them.
3	"Champ"	Pappy's	Gordon Anderson	16 June 2014	TBA
Matthew is determined not to be outdone by athletic co-worker Lucy in the Carabine Promotions Annual Charity Fundraiser Fun Run.
4	"Work and Play"	Pappy's	Gordon Anderson	23 June 2014	TBA
Ben accidentally secures a job as VP of Carabine Promotions to Matthew's disgust, while Tom attempts to write an award-winning play.
5	"Holiday"	Pappy's	Gordon Anderson	30 June 2014	TBA
Tensions bubble over as Matthew tries to get everyone ready to leave for a holiday and the taxi is about to arrive.
6	"Changes"	Pappy's	Gordon Anderson	7 July 2014	TBA
Matthew has a life-changing decision to make and the entire future of the flatmates hangs on a single roll of a mystical dice.
