= Tom Craine =

English comedian, writer and broadcaster

- Occupations: Comedian; Writer; Broadcaster

Tom Craine is an English comedian, writer and broadcaster.

As well as performing solo stand up comedy Craine has performed as part of a sketch group called Jigsaw with Dan Antopolski and Nat Luurtsema.

He co-wrote the sitcom Josh (TV series) with Josh Widdicombe for the BBC and ReincarNathan for BBC Radio 4 with Henry Paker, which was nominated for awards at both the Arias and BBC Radio Drama Awards. He co-devised and wrote the panel show Hypothetical for UK TV channel Dave.

For television he has written for Mock The Week, The Last Leg, Have I Got News For You, Michael McIntyre's Big Show, Fantasy Football League, Mel Giedryoc: Unforgivable, Rob Beckett's Smart TV, Stand Up To Cancer, Gladiators and 8 out of 10 Cats, he has appeared on Russell Howard’s Good News, Live at the Electric, and Drunk History.

Tom presents the comedy / history podcast Oh What A Time with Elis James and Chris Scull, having regularly appeared on Josh Widdicombe’s football nostalgia podcast Quickly Kevin, Will He Score? He has had a show on Radio X for which ‘Tom Craine’s story show’ was available as a podcast. He has also had shows for BBC Radio Bristol and co-presented on BBC Radio Wales with Rhod Gilbert.

He has written regular columns for Cosmopolitan (magazine) called ‘Sex and the Single Guy’ and he used the correspondence from readers he received as the basis for a one man show called ‘Thoughts on Love (By a Man With None of the Answers)’.

== Personal life ==
He is from Bath, Somerset. In childhood he was the lead chorister of Bath Abbey Choir and sang a solo on the 1990 Songs Of Praise Christmas special.
