= Pappy's =

British three-man comedy act

- Other name: Pappy's Fun Club (2004-2009)

Comedy career
- Years active: 2004–present
- Medium: Television, theatre, radio, podcasts
- Genre: Sketch comedy
- Members: Ben Clark; Matthew Crosby; Tom Parry
- Former members: Brendan Dodds
- Website: pappyscomedy.com

Pappy's, originally known as Pappy's Fun Club, is a British three-man comedy act, composed of comedians Ben Clark, Matthew Crosby and Tom Parry. The sketch troupe previously performed shows at the Edinburgh Festival Fringe, but now mostly talk on podcasts about balconies and spaghetti. They regularly produce podcasts under the Pappy's Flatshare heading, and created and starred in the BBC Three sitcom Badults.

== History ==
Pappy's started out as a four-man comedy collective called "Pappy's Fun Club", consisting of Ben Clark, Matthew Crosby, Brendan Dodds, and Tom Parry. The group met at the University of Kent and started out performing in Canterbury and Wolverhampton. They later moved to London and in 2004, began performing regular shows in The Old Coffee House, in Soho, London. Pappy's Fun Club made their self-titled debut appearance at the Edinburgh Festival Fringe in 2006, as part of the Free Fringe. In February 2007, the group was nominated for Best Newcomer at the Chortle Awards.

In August 2007, the team returned to the Fringe with their second show, which received critical acclaim. It was performed at Just The Tonic, located in C Soco urban garden, Cowgate. Several top comedy critics praised it, with Dominic Maxwell describing the show as "extraordinarily fresh" and Bruce Dessau praising their "instinctive rapport" and "the general air of merriment". However, not all reviews were positive, with Brian Logan's review of a performance in Brighton stating that "little distinguishes these four youngsters from countless other all-male sketch troupes". The show was nominated for the 2007 if.comedy award (formerly the Perrier Comedy Award, now the Edinburgh Comedy Awards). They later won the 2008 Chortle Award for best sketch, variety or character act.

In March 2008, the team performed their 2007 show at the Melbourne Comedy Festival. Later that year, they returned to the Fringe with a new show, Funergy, performed at the Pleasance Cabaret Bar.

In 2009, the group returned to the Fringe for a fourth consecutive year with a show called Pappy’s Fun Club’s World Record Attempt: 200 Sketches in an Hour. This show was performed in Pleasance One. The show was universally praised, and received a five-star rating.

In late 2009, Pappy's Fun Club announced that they were parting with one of their founding members, Brendan Dodds, and moving forward as a trio called Pappy's. The split was not entirely reciprocal, with Brendan writing on Twitter that he was asked to leave as "a business decision" and Matthew stating in an interview that "the relationship we had with Brendan ran its course".

In early 2010, Pappy's became the first British act to perform at the SF Sketchfest. In August, they returned to the Fringe with a new show, All Business. Like the previous year, this show was performed in Pleasance One. The following year, the troupe took a year off from the Fringe - however, Matthew returned with a solo show called AdventureParty.

In 2012, Pappy's returned to the Fringe with a new show, Last Show Ever. This show received critical acclaim, receiving five-star reviews from The Telegraph, The Guardian, The Scotsman, The List, Chortle, and many others. The show received a nomination for the 2012 Edinburgh Comedy Award. Pappy's toured Last Show Ever around the UK in October and November, and in April 2013 performed it in a three-week run at the Soho Theatre.

Pappy's continued to provide free audio and video during the pandemic via the medium of podcasts and since 2024 have displayed a particularly rich vein of form.

== Podcasts ==
From 2025, Pappy's have released all podcasts under the name Pappy's Flatshare but there are three variants:

- An unscripted conversation between the three members of Pappy's. This format was previously called House Meeting but is now simply titled with an episode number.
- An unscripted conversation between Pappy's and a guest comedian. The title is the episode number and the name of the guest.
- Flatshare Slamdown is a live panel show set in their shared flat, with Matthew Crosby as the landlord and host. In 2012 Flatshare Slamdown won the Loaded LAFTA award for Funniest Podcast.

Previous podcast formats include:

- Beef Brothers Cold Cuts. A longer form of the Beef Brothers round of Flatshare Slamdown, in which Pappy's and a guest comedian attempted to solve listeners' personal problems, or "beefs".
- Bangers and Mash, was similar to the House Meeting format in that it was an unscripted conversation, however, the conversation was interspersed with scripted sketches based on the content of the conversation. It was iTunes Top New Comedy Podcast in 2011.

Pappy's also release a weekly podcast for Patreon members. During the COVID 19 pandemic, the Patreon podcasts were titled Pappy's Flatshare Lockdown but this has since been changed to Pappy's Flatshare Pop Round.

In 2025 Pappy's began filming their free podcasts and releasing them on YouTube.

== Television and radio ==
On 15 November 2007, Pappy's Fun Club appeared on the BBC Three comedy programme, Comedy Shuffle.

Pappy's (and Pappy's Fun Club) have made several pilots including a self-titled radio pilot for BBC Radio 4, broadcast on 12 May 2008, a self-titled Comedy Lab for Channel 4 television, broadcast on 28 August 2008, and a second Comedy Lab called Mr and Mrs Hotty Hott Hot Show, broadcast on 30 October 2011. None of these pilots were commissioned for further development.

Pappy's most notable television showpiece is that of Badults which aired on BBC Three in 2013 and 2014, starring themselves along with Emer Kenny, Katherine Ryan, Jack Docherty and Cariad Lloyd.
