= Tom Parry (comedian) =

English comedian (born 1980)

- Born: Thomas Edward Parry; 16 December 1980 (age 45)
- Other name: Tomos Parry
- Children: 2

Comedy career
- Years active: 2004–present
- Medium: Stand-up, sketch, television, podcast

Tom Parry, later credited as Tom Parry Wicks, is an English comedian, writer, podcaster and actor. He is one-third of the sketch/podcast group Pappy's.

== Career ==
=== Stand-up ===
Parry performed his debut solo show Yellow T-Shirt at the 2015 Edinburgh Festival Fringe. It was nominated as the Best Newcomer at the Edinburgh Comedy Awards and earned Parry a BBC radio show. It was also nominated for Best Show at the 2016 Chortle Awards.

Parry has appeared on the Quickly Kevin, Will He Score? podcast with Josh Widdicombe. At the 2014 Edinburgh Festival he produced a show for Beasts at the Pleasance Courtyard and repeated this in 2015.

=== Pappy's ===
Parry is a member of the sketch troupe Pappy's producing podcasts, television and stage shows, some of which have been nominated for awards at the Edinburgh Festival.

=== Television ===
With Pappy's, Parry starred in the sitcom Badults (2013–2014). He's appeared in several other shows, indcluding guest spots on Miranda and Ted Lasso. He was a writer on ITV's sitcom The Job Lot and several series of Great Movie Mistakes on BBC 3.

Since 2026, he has been the Performance Director of Saturday Night Live UK. Parry was also a writer on Channel 5 crime drama series Benidorm Is Murder, starring John Hannah.

=== Film ===
Parry's debut film screenplay Your Christmas or Mine? was filmed at Pinewood Studios. The film stars Asa Butterfield, Cora Kirk, Angela Griffin and Daniel Mays and released on Amazon Prime Video on 2 December 2022. A sequel, Your Christmas or Mine 2, was filmed in 2023.

=== Conceptual Artist ===
Parry's alternative persona as conceptual artist "Peeping Tom" has been described as the "Great Voyeur of the Art World" and is planning an upcoming exhibition titled "Scene and not herd" as well as appearing in several episodes of Happy Days.

== Personal life ==
Originally from Wolverhampton, Parry studied English and Drama at the University of Kent. Parry married in 2019.
