= Angela Griffin =

British actress and television presenter (born 1976)

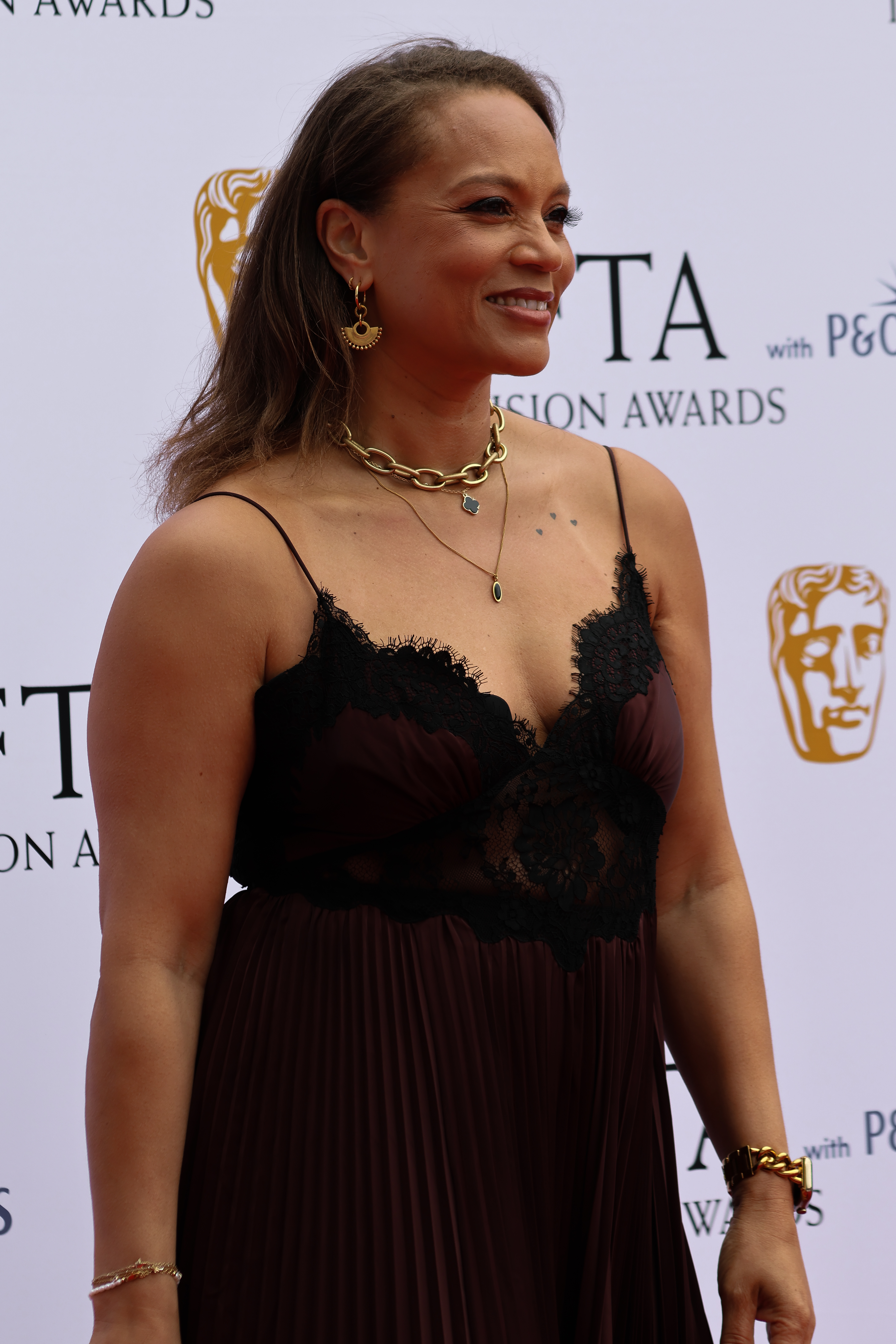
- Griffin in 2026
- Born: Angela Mellissa Griffin; 19 July 1976 (age 50); Leeds, West Yorkshire, England
- Education: Beeston Primary School; Hugh Gaitskell Middle School; Intake High School
- Years active: 1991–present
- Known for: Coronation Street; Holby City; Cutting It; Down to Earth; Waterloo Road; Angela and Friends; Emergency with Angela Griffin; Mount Pleasant
- Spouse: Jason Milligan (m. 2006)
- Children: 2

Angela Mellissa Griffin (born 19 July 1976) is an English actress, television presenter, and director who has been active on British television since the early 1990s. She is best known for portraying the roles of Fiona Middleton in the ITV soap opera Coronation Street (1992–1998, 2019), and Kim Campbell in the BBC One school-based drama series Waterloo Road (2006–2007, 2009–2010, 2023–2024).

Griffin's other notable acting roles include Holby City (1999–2001), Babyfather (2001–2002), Cutting It (2002–2005), Down to Earth (2003–2004), Mount Pleasant (2011–2012), and Lewis (2014–2015).

== Early life and education ==
Angela Mellissa Griffin was born on 19 July 1976 in Leeds, England, to an English mother and father from the Caribbean island of Saint Kitts and Nevis.

She grew up on Cottingley Estate, near Beeston, Leeds. She attended Beeston Primary School, Hugh Gaitskell Middle School, and Intake High School in Leeds.

== Career ==
Between December 1992 and September 1998, Griffin appeared in the popular long-running ITV soap opera Coronation Street as hairdresser Fiona Middleton. She made a guest appearance in 2019. Griffin appeared in the ITV soap opera Emmerdale in 1993, playing a minor character called Tina. Subsequently, she joined the original cast of the BBC One medical drama series Holby City as staff nurse Jasmine Hopkins, but left at the end of the third series in 2001 as the next series would be longer. Griffin has also appeared in the BBC dramas Cutting It and Down to Earth.

In October 2001, Griffin presented Brown Britain, a programme on the UK's Channel 4 about mixed race people in British society. The show included interviews with a large number of well-known British mixed-race people such as Bruce Oldfield and Hanif Kureishi, as well as political figures such as Tony Benn.

From 2006 to 2010, she appeared as art teacher and head of pastoral care Kim Campbell opposite former Cutting It co-star Jason Merrells and former Coronation Street co-star Denise Welch in the BBC One school-based drama series Waterloo Road. She took a break during the third series in late 2007/early 2008, but returned to the role for the fourth series in 2009. However, she left once again at the end of the fifth series to concentrate on her new daytime show on Sky One.

From November 2009 to July 2010, Griffin hosted her own live daytime show on Sky1 called Angela and Friends, a mix of health topics and celebrity gossip. She was joined by her best friends Lisa Faulkner and Nicola Stephenson. In 1999, she presented The Midweek National Lottery and also took part in the BBC's millennium programme on New Year's Eve. She filmed a pilot for the show Dishes on Channel 4, but decided against presenting it once it had been commissioned and was replaced by Kate Thornton.

Griffin also provides the voice of Amy, the vet in children's television show Postman Pat.

In March 2008, Griffin appeared on the daytime reality show Murder Most Famous, where, with five other celebrities, she wrote a crime novel, coached by crime writer Minette Walters, the end prize being, having the winning celebrities' novel published. It was won by former Coronation Street co-star Sherrie Hewson.

In January 2010, Griffin and Gethin Jones co-presented Sky1's coverage of the Golden Globes. Griffin appeared in the first two series of Sky TV comedy drama Mount Pleasant and presented Emergency with Angela Griffin on Sky1. In January 2012, she appeared in the BBC Two show The Great Sport Relief Bake Off and was one of three finalists.

In 2013, Griffin played Dolly in One Man, Two Guvnors. In 2014 and 2015, Griffin starred as DS Lizzie Maddox in the ITV series Lewis. From 5 to 9 January 2015, Griffin and Kian Egan co-hosted Fat Pets: Slimmer of the Year for ITV.

Griffin had a recurring role as Elizabeth Harvey in the third series of Harlots. On 17 September 2018, Griffin co-presented The One Show on BBC One alongside Matt Baker.

In October 2018, Griffin began playing detective Stevie Hall in the Canadian drama The Detail.

Griffin has hosted BBC Radio 2's Unwinds, since August 2021. From September 2021, Griffin also started sitting in for Steve Wright on Sunday Love Songs and continues to sit in for Michael Ball on various occasions on the station.

In January 2022, it was announced that Griffin would once again reprise her role as Kim Campbell for a new series of Waterloo Road, with her character now promoted to head teacher. She left after the thirteenth series, but appeared in the final episode of series fourteen. Griffin became one of the directors of the series with the third episode of series thirteen and so far has directed a total of five episodes.

In April 2022, Griffin starred in the Netflix horror film Choose or Die, playing the protagonist's mother, Thea.

In May 2022, Griffin voiced the eponymous Medea in OpenLearn's animated video summary of Euripides' ancient Greek tragedy play.

In 2025 and 2026, Griffin directed six episodes of BBC police drama Blue Lights.

== Filmography ==
Key
| † | Denotes works that have not yet been released |

=== Film ===
| Year | Film | Role | Notes |
|---|---|---|---|
| 1997 | Coronation Street: Viva Las Vegas! | Fiona Middleton | Direct-to video |
| 2008 | Last Chance Harvey | Melissa | |
| 2019 | Hatima | Dr. Ibironke | Short film |
| 2022 | Choose or Die | Thea | |
| 2022 | Medea - An Ancient Greek Tragedy | Medea (voice) | Online video |
| 2022 | Your Christmas or Mine? | Kath | |
| 2023 | Your Christmas or Mine 2 | Kath | |

=== Television ===
| Year | Film | Role | Notes |
|---|---|---|---|
| 1992–1998, 2019 | Coronation Street | Fiona Middleton | Series regular; 493 episodes |
| 1993 | Emmerdale | Tina | Guest role; 1 episode |
| 1999–2001 | Holby City | Jasmine Hopkins | Series regular; 49 episodes |
| 2001 | Waking the Dead | Marina Coleman | Episode: "Burn Out" |
| 2001–2002 | Babyfather | Chantelle | Series regular; 12 episodes |
| 2002–2005 | Cutting It | Darcey Henshall | Series regular; 25 episodes |
| 2003 | Spoilt | Caitlin | Television film |
| 2003–2004 | Down to Earth | Frankie Brewer | Series regular; 16 episodes |
| 2005 | Open Wide | Sally Tonkin | Television film |
| 2005–2006 | Postman Pat | Amy Wrigglesworth | Recurring role; 5 episodes |
| 2006–2007, 2009–2010, 2023–2024 | Waterloo Road | Kim Campbell | Series regular; 72 episodes |
| 2008–2013 | Postman Pat | Lizzy Taylor | Recurring role; 31 episodes |
| 2009 | Boy Meets Girl | Fiona | Miniseries; 4 episodes |
| 2009 | 10 Minute Tales | Clare | Episode: "Let It Snow" |
| 2011 | Hustle | Georgina Althorp | Episode: "Old Sparks Comes New" |
| 2011–2012 | Mount Pleasant | Shelley Porter | Series regular; 18 episodes |
| 2014 | The Dumping Ground | Sasha | Episode: "The Dumping Ground Experience" |
| 2014–2015 | Lewis | DS Lizzie Maddox | Series regular; 12 episodes |
| 2016 | Brief Encounters | Nita | Miniseries; 6 episodes |
| 2016 | Ordinary Lies | Jenna | Series regular; 6 episodes |
| 2018 | Midsomer Murders | Jenny Moss | Episode: "The Ghost of Causton Abbey" |
| 2018 | The Detail | Detective Stevie Hall | Series regular; 10 episodes |
| 2019 | Turn Up Charlie | Astrid | Recurring role; 7 episodes |
| 2019 | Wild Bill | Lisa Cranston | Recurring role; 5 episodes |
| 2019 | Harlots | Elizabeth Harvey | Recurring role; 8 episodes |
| 2020 | Isolation Stories | Rochelle | Episode: "Mike & Rochelle" |
| 2020 | White Lines | Anna Connor | Series regular; 9 episodes |
| 2020 | Dun Breedin' | Susie Daniels | Miniseries; 9 episodes |
| 2020 | The Hollow | Unknown | Television film |
| 2021 | Help | Tori | Television film |
| 2021 | Crime | Trudi Lowe | Series regular; 6 episodes |
| 2022 | The Suspect | Melinda | Miniseries; 3 episodes |
| 2023 | The Serial Killer's Wife | DI Aline Edgeworth | Miniseries; 2 episodes |
| 2024 | The Wives | Natasha Morgan | 6 episodes |
| 2024 | Death in Paradise | Tabitha Reed | Episode: "Christmas Special" |
