= List of Edinburgh Comedy Award winners =

The Edinburgh Comedy Awards, formerly known as the Perrier Comedy Awards, the if.comedy awards and briefly as the if.comeddies, are a group of prizes awarded annually since 1981 to comedy shows at the Edinburgh Festival Fringe.

Each award currently has a separate sponsor, being sponsored by Sky TV, DLT Entertainment and The Victoria Wood Foundation, respectively.

They have previously been sponsored by Perrier, lastminute.com, Dave, and Foster's Lager.

Currently three awards are given – Best Comedy Show, Best Newcomer and the Panel Prize.

== Main prize ==
Perrier Comedy Awards
Year	Main prize winner	Main prize nominees
1981	Cambridge Footlights (Stephen Fry, Hugh Laurie, Tony Slattery, Emma Thompson, Penny Dwyer and Paul Shearer)	
1982	Writer's Inc (Gary Adams, Steve Brown, Vicki Pile, Trevor McCallum, Helen Murry, Jamie Rix, and Nick Wilton, with additional material by Kim Fuller)	
1983	Los Trios Ringbarkus	
1984	The Brass Band	Fascinating Aïda; Hank Wangford Band; Frank Chickens; The Bodgers; Paul B. Davies & Dave Cohen
1985	Théâtre de Complicité	The Bodgers; Merry Mac Fun Show; John Dowie; Sue Ingleton
1986	Ben Keaton	Paul B. Davies; Roy Hutchins; Jenny Lecoat; Merry Mac Fun Show
1987	Brown Blues... Arnold Brown with Barb Jungr and Michael Parker	Nick Revell; Jeremy Hardy; Simon Fanshawe; John Sparkes
1988	Jeremy Hardy	Doug Anthony Allstars; Roy Hutchins – Spacehoppers Clackers & Really Big Fish; Robert Llewellyn's Mammon Robot Born of Woman; The Wow Show
1989	Simon Fanshawe	John Hegley – Can I Come Down Now Dad? Al and George – Unscheduled Stop; Will Durst; Live Bed Show; The World of Les and Robert
1990	Sean Hughes – A One Night Stand	Dillie Keane – Single Again; Pete McCarthy – The Hangover Show; Jimmy Tingle
1991	Frank Skinner	Avner the Eccentric; Jack Dee; Eddie Izzard – Just the Words; Lily Savage – The Live Experience
1992	Steve Coogan – In Character with John Thomson	Jo Brand; Bruce Morton – Sin; John Shuttleworth's Guide to Stardom; Mark Thomas
1993	Lee Evans	Corky and the Juice Pigs; Phil Kay; Johnny Meres – My Booze Hell by Little Johnny Cartilage; Donna McPhail; Parrot – Sick as a Parrot; Greg Proops
1994	Lano and Woodley	Alan Davies; Jeff Green; Harry Hill's Pub Internationale with Al Murray; Owen O'Neill – It's a bit like this... Robert Schimmel
1995	Jenny Eclair – Prozac & Tantrums	Simon Bligh – Banzai; Scott Capurro – The Love and Affection Tour; Boothby Graffoe – The Love and Affection Tour; The Umbilical Brothers – Heaven by Storm
1996	Dylan Moran – Dylan Moran Is Indisposed	Alexander Armstrong and Ben Miller – Armstrong and Miller: The Quality Shag; Bill Bailey; Rich Hall – Freewheelin; Dominic Holland – Holland-Days Sauce; Al Murray
1997	The League of Gentlemen	Milton Jones – Joyrider; Al Murray – King of Beers; Graham Norton – Charlie’s Angels go to Hell; The Johnny Vegas Show
1998	Tommy Tiernan – Undivine Comedy	Ed Byrne – A Night at the Opera; Seán Cullen – Wood, Cheese & Children; Peter Kay; Al Murray – Pub Landlord's Keeper of the Pint Cosmic
1999	Al Murray as The Pub Landlord – And a Glass of White Wine for the Lady	Terry Alderton; The Arctic Boosh; Simon Munnery as The League Against Tedium – Ubertechnocomedie; Ross Noble – Laser Boy
2000	Rich Hall – Otis Lee Crenshaw	Dave Gorman – Are You Dave Gorman? Lee Mack's New Bits, with Lee Mack, Catherine Tate and Dan Antopolski; Sean Lock – No Flatley, I am the Lord of the Dance; Garth Marenghi's Fright Knight, with Matthew Holness, Richard Ayoade, and Alice Lowe
2001	Garth Marenghi's Netherhead, with Matthew Holness, Richard Ayoade, and Alice Lowe	Dan Antopolski – Antopolski 2000; Jason Byrne; Adam Hills – Go You Big Red Fire Engine; Daniel Kitson – Love, Innocence and the Word Cock
2002	Daniel Kitson – Something	Noel Fielding – Voodoo Hedgehog; Jimmy Carr – Jimmy Carr's Bare Faced Ambition; Omid Djalili – Behind Enemy Lines; Phil Nichol – Things I Like, I Lick; Adam Hills – Happy Feet
2003	Demetri Martin – If I...	Reginald D. Hunter – White Woman; Adam Hills – Cut Loose; Flight of the Conchords – High on Folk; Howard Read and Little Howard – The Big Howard and Little Howard Show
2004	Will Adamsdale – Jackson's Way	Chris Addison – Civilisation; Epitaph with Ethan Sandler and Adrian Wenner; Reginald D Hunter – A Mystery Wrapped in a N***a; Sarah Kendall
2005	Laura Solon – Kopfraper's Syndrome	Chris Addison – Atomicity; Jason Manford – Urban Legend; Jeremy Lion (AKA Justin Edwards) with George Cockerill – What's the Time Mr Lion? Dutch Elm Conservatoire – Conspiracy
if.comedy awards (styled as if.comeddie for 2006)
Year	Main prize winner	Main prize nominees
2006	Phil Nichol – The Naked Racist	David O'Doherty – David O'Doherty Is My Name; Russell Howard – Wandering; Paul Sinha – Saint or Sinha? We Are Klang – Klangbang
2007	Brendon Burns – So I Suppose THIS Is Offensive Now	Andrew Lawrence – Social Leprosy for Beginners and Improvers; Andrew Maxwell – Waxin'; Tom Binns – Ivan Brackenbury's Hospital Radio Roadshow; Pappy's Fun Club – Pappy's Fun Club
2008	David O'Doherty – Let's Comedy	Rhod Gilbert – Rhod Gilbert and the Award-winning Mince Pie; Russell Kane – Gaping Flaws; Kristen Schaal and Kurt Braunohler – Double Down Hearts
Edinburgh Comedy Awards (known as the Foster's Edinburgh Comedy Awards since 2010)
Year	Main prize winner	Main prize nominees
2009	Tim Key – The Slutcracker	Idiots of Ants – This Is War; John Bishop – Elvis Has Left the Building; Jon Richardson – This Guy at Night; Russell Kane – Human Dressage; Tom Wrigglesworth – Tom Wrigglesworth's Open Return Letter to Richard Branson
2010	Russell Kane – Smokescreens and Castles	Bo Burnham – Words, Words, Words; Greg Davies – Firing Cheeseballs at a Dog; Josie Long – Be Honourable; Sarah Millican: Chatterbox
2011	Adam Riches – Bring Me the Head of Adam Riches	Andrew Maxwell – The Lights Are On; Chris Ramsey – Offermation; Josie Long – The Future Is Another Place; Nick Helm – Dare to Dream; Sam Simmons – Meanwhile
2012	Doctor Brown – Befrdfgth	Claudia O'Doherty – The Telescope; James Acaster – Prompt; Josie Long – Romance and Adventure; Pappy's – Last Show Ever! Tony Law – Maximum Nonsense
2013	Bridget Christie – A Bic for Her	Carl Donnelly – Now That's What I Carl Donnelly! Volume V James Acaster – Lawnmower; Max & Ivan – The Reunion; Mike Wozniak – Take The Hit; Nick Helm – One Man Mega Myth; Seann Walsh – The Lie-in King
2014	John Kearns – Shtick	Alex Horne – Monsieur Butterfly; James Acaster – Recognise; Liam Williams – Capitalism; Romesh Ranganathan – Rom Wasn't Built in a Day; Sam Simmons – Death of a Sails-Man; Sara Pascoe – Sara Pascoe vs History
2015	Sam Simmons – Spaghetti for Breakfast	James Acaster – Represent; Joseph Morpurgo – Soothing Sounds for Baby; Kieran Hodgson – Lance; Nish Kumar – Long Word. Long Word.. Blah Blah Blah.. I'm So Clever; Sarah Kendall – A Day in October; Seymour Mace – Seymour Mace Is Niche as F**k! Trygve Wakenshaw – Nautilus
Edinburgh Comedy Awards (known as the lastminute.com Edinburgh Comedy Awards since 2016)
Year	Main prize winner	Main prize nominees
2016	Richard Gadd – Monkey See Monkey Do	Al Porter – At Large; James Acaster – Reset; Kieran Hodgson – Maestro; Nish Kumar – Actions Speak Louder Than Words, Unless You Shout The Words Real Loud; Randy Feltface – Randy Writes A Novel; Tom Ballard – The World Keeps Happening; Zoe Coombs Marr – Trigger Warning
2017	Hannah Gadsby – Nanette John Robins – The Darkness of Robins	Ahir Shah – Control; Elf Lyons – Swan; Jordan Brookes – Body of Work; Mae Martin – Dope; Mat Ewins – Presents Adventureman 7: The Return of Adventureman; Sophie Willan – Branded; Spencer Jones – The Audition
2018	Rose Matafeo – Horndog	Ahir Shah – Duffer; Alex Edelman – Just For Us; Felicity Ward – Busting A Nut; Glenn Moore – Glenn Glenn Glenn, How Do You Like It, How Do You Like It; Kieran Hodgson – '75; Larry Dean – Bampot
	Dave's Edinburgh Comedy Awards	
Year	Main prize winner	Main prize nominees
2019	Jordan Brookes – I've Got Nothing	Darren Harriott – Good Heart Yute; Demi Lardner – Ditch Witch 800; Goodbear – Dougal; Ivo Graham – The Game of Life; Jessica Fostekew – Hench; London Hughes – To Catch a D*ck; Spencer Jones – The Things We Leave Behind; The Delightful Sausage – Ginster's Paradise
2020	Edinburgh Festival Fringe cancelled due to the COVID-19 pandemic	
2021	Edinburgh Festival Fringe in reduced scope due to the COVID-19 pandemic	
2022	Sam Campbell – Comedy Show	Alfie Brown – Sensitive Man; Colin Hoult – The Death of Anna Mann; The Delightful Sausage – Nowt but Sea; Jordan Gray – Is It a Bird? Josh Pugh – Sausage, Egg, Josh Pugh, Chips and Beans; Larry Dean – Fudnut; Lauren Pattison – It Is What It Is; Liz Kingsman – One-Woman Show; Seann Walsh – Is Dead. Happy Now?
	Edinburgh Comedy Awards (sponsored by Sky, DLT Entertainment and the Victoria Wood Foundation)	
Year	Main prize winner	Main prize nominees
2023	Ahir Shah – Ends	Ania Magliano – I Can't Believe You've Done This; Emmanuel Sonubi – Curriculum Vitae; Ian Smith – Crushing; Janine Harouni – Man'oushe; Julia Masli – ha ha ha ha ha ha ha Kieran Hodgson – Big in Scotland; Phil Ellis – Phil Ellis's Excellent Comedy Show
2024	Amy Gledhill – Make Me Look Fit on the Poster	Catherine Bohart – Again, With Feelings; Chris Cantrill – Easily Swayed; Josh Glanc – Family Man; Natalie Palamides – WEER; Reuben Kaye – Live and Intimidating; Sarah Keyworth – My Eyes Are Up Here
2025	Sam Nicoresti – Baby Doomer	Creepy Boys – SLUGS; Dan Tiernan – All In; Ed Night – Your Old Mucker; Ian Smith – Foot Spa Half Empty; John Tothill – This Must Be Heaven; Katie Norris – Go West, Old Maid; Sam Jay – We the People
2026	Chris Cantrill – Rewilding	Dan Tiernan – Quartz and All; Harriet Dyer – Easily Distra... Lara Ricote – INKLING; Li Jin Hao – Falling From a Moon; Spencer Jones – Dogs

== Best Newcomer Award ==
Best Newcomer Award
Year	Winner	Nominees
1992	Harry Hill – Flies!	
1993	Dominic Holland – Red Hot Dutch with Dominic	
1994	Scott Capurro – Risk Gay	
1995	Tim Vine – The Tim Vine Fiasco	
1996	Milton Jones – The Head	
1997	Arj Barker – Arj Barker's Letter to America	
1998	The Mighty Boosh, with Julian Barratt, Noel Fielding and Rich Fulcher	Chris Addison; Jason Byrne; Jon Reed; Paul Foot
1999	Ben'n'Arn's Big Top, with Ben Willbond, Arnold Widdowson	Infinite Number of Monkeys, with Tim FitzHigham and James Cary – Sketch Comedy of Hypotheticals; The Arthur Dung Show, with Dave Lamb and Jim North; Wil Anderson – Wilennium
2000	Noble and Silver	Andrew Clover – A Man of Substance in a World of Filth; Dan Antopolski – Second Coming; David O'Doherty – David O'Doherty's The Boy Who Saved Comedy
2001	Garth Cruickshank & Eddie McCabe - Let's Have a Right Royal Shambles	Andy Zaltzman – Andy Zaltzman versus the Dog of Doom, with John Oliver; Cambridge Footlights – Far too Happy, with Edward Jaspers, Tim Key, Day Macaskill, James Morris, Mark Watson and Sophie Winkleman; Danny Bhoy
2002	The Consultants – Finger in the Wind	Hal Cruttenden; Natalie Haynes; Reginald D. Hunter
2003	Gary Le Strange – Polaroid Suitcase	Alex Horne – Making Fish Laugh with Tim Key; Michael McIntyre; Miles Jupp – Gentlemen Prefer Brogues
2004	Wil Hodgson – The Passion Of The Hodgson	Alun Cochrane – My Favourite Words in My Favourite Stories; Joanna Neary – Joanna Neary is not feeling herself Sabotage: In Fine Form, aka Shenoah Allen and Mark Shavez
2005	Tim Minchin – Dark Side	Charlie Pickering – Betterman; Mark Watson – 50 years before I die Rhod Gilbert – Rhod Gilbert's 1984; Toulson and Harvey, aka Stephen Harvey and Luke Toulson
2006	Josie Long – Kindness & Exuberance	Fat Tongue with Sophie Black, Seb Cardinal and Dustin Demri Burns; God's Pottery – Concert for Lavert; Russell Kane – Russell Kane's Theory of Pretension
2007	Tom Basden – Won't Say Anything	Jon Richardson – Spatula Pad; Micky Flanagan – What Chance Change? Zoe Lyons – Fight or Flight
2008	Sarah Millican – Sarah Millican's Not Nice	Mike Wozniak; Pippa Evans
2009	Jonny Sweet – Mostly About Arthur	Carl Donnelly – Relax Everyone, It's Carl Donnelly! Jack Whitehall – Nearly Rebellious; Kevin Bridges – An Hour to Sing for Your Soul; Pete Johansson – Naked Pictures of My Life
2010	Roisin Conaty – Hero, Warrior, Fireman, Liar	An Audience with Imran Yusuf; Asher Treleaven – Secret Door; Gareth Richards – Stand Up Between Songs; Late Night Gimp Fight! The Boy With Tape on His Face
2011	Humphrey Ker – Humphrey Ker is Dymock Watson: Nazi Smasher	Cariad Lloyd – Lady Cariad's Characters; The Chris and Paul Show; Hannibal Buress – My Name is Hannibal – The Hannibal Montanabal Experience; Josh Widdicombe – If This Show Changes One Life; Holly Walsh – Hollycopter; Thom Tuck – Thom Tuck Goes Straight-to-DVD; Totally Tom
2012	Daniel Simonsen – Champions	David Trent – Spontaneous Comedian; Discover Ben Target; Joe Lycett – Some Lycett Hot; Sam Fletcher – Good on Paper
2013	John Kearns – Sight Gags For Perverts	Aisling Bea – C'est La Bea; Liam Williams; Matt Okine – Being Black & Chicken & S#%t; Romesh Ranganathan – Rom Com
2014	Alex Edelman – Millennial	Dane Baptiste – Citizen Dane; Gein's Family Giftshop – Gein's Family Giftshop Volume 1 Lazy Susan – Extreme Humans; Lucy Beaumont – We Can Twerk it Out; Steen Raskopoulos – I'm Wearing Two Suits Because I Mean Business
2015	Sofie Hagen – Bubblewrap	Adam Hess – Salmon; Daphne – Daphne Do Edinburgh; Larry Dean – Out Now! John Henry Falle – The Story Beast; Tom Ballard – Taxis & Rainbows & Hatred; Tom Parry – Yellow T-shirt
2016	Scott Gibson – Life After Death	Bilal Zafar – Cakes; Brennan Reece – Everglow; Jayde Adams – 31; Michelle Wolf – So Brave; Nath Valvo – Happy Idiot
2017	Natalie Palamides – LAID	Chris Washington – Dream Big (Within Reason); Darren Harriott – Defiant; Ed Night – Anthem for Doomed Youth; Kwame Asante – Open Arms; Lauren Pattison – Lady Muck; Lucy Pearman – Maid of Cabbage; Rob Kemp – The Elvis Dead
2018	Ciarán Dowd – Don Rodolfo	Maisie Adam – Vague; Olga Koch – Fight; Sara Barron – For Worse; Sarah Keyworth – Dark Horse; Sindhu Vee – Sandhog
2019	Catherine Cohen – The Twist? She's Gorgeous	Crybabies – Danger Brigade; Helen Bauer – Little Miss Baby Angel Face; Huge Davies – The Carpark; Janine Harouni – Stand Up With Janine Harouni (Please Remain Seated); Michael Odewale – #BLACKBEARSMATTER; Nigel Ng – Culture Shocked; Sophie Duker – Venus
2020	Edinburgh Festival Fringe cancelled due to the COVID-19 pandemic	
2021	Edinburgh Festival Fringe reduced in scope due to the COVID-19 pandemic	
2022	Lara Ricote – GRL/LATNX/DEF	Amy Gledhill – The Girl Before The Girl You Marry; Emily Wilson – Fixed; Emmanuel Sonubi – Emancipated; Josh Jones – Waste of Space; Leo Reich – Literally Who Cares?! Vittorio Angelone – Translations
2023	Urooj Ashfaq – Oh No!	Bill O'Neill – The Amazing Banana Brothers; Dan Tiernan – Going Under; Lindsey Santoro – Pink Tinge; Louise Young – Feral; Martin Urbano – Apology Comeback Tour; Paddy Young – Hungry, Horny, Scared
2024	Joe Kent-Walters – Joe Kent-Walters is Frankie Monroe: LIVE!!!	Abby Wambaugh – The First 3 Minutes of 17 Shows; Demi Adejuyigbe – Demi Adejuyigbe Is Going To Do One (1) Backflip; Jack Skipper – Skint; Jin Hao Li – Swimming in a Submarine
2025	Ayoade Bamgboye – Swings and Roundabouts	Ada and Bron – The Origin of Love; Elouise Eftos – Australia's First Attractive Comedian; Kate Owens – Cooking with Kathryn; Molly McGuinness – Slob; Roger O'Sullivan – Fekken; Toussaint Douglass – Accessible Pigeon Material
2026	Marty Gleeson – Dog Ear	Dom McGovern – Prize Hog; Fatiha El-Ghorri – Cockney Stacking Doll; Freddie Meredith – Need a Light? Omar Badawy – Guided Detour; Tom Towelling – Teaches You to Knit; Underground Monk Show

== Panel Prize ==
Panel Prize
Year	Winner
2006	Mark Watson – For his 36 hour show during the festival
2007	Arthur Smith – Arturart, an exhibition of comedians' artwork
2008	All the performers – £4000 was put behind the bar in lieu of giving a prize
2009	Peter Buckley Hill – Peter Buckley Hill Free Fringe
2010	Bo Burnham – Words Words Words
2011	The Wrestling – Max & Ivan
2012	The Boy With Tape On His Face – More Tape
2013	Adrienne Truscott – Adrienne Truscott's Asking For It: A One Lady Rape About Comedy
2014	Funz and Gamez
2015	Karen Koren – Head of Gilded Balloon since 1986
2016	Iraq Out & Loud: (Heroes of Fringe) – Reading the Chilcot Report in Full
2017	No Panel Prize awarded, as the Best Show prize was awarded to both John Robins and Hannah Gadsby
2018	Angela Barnes, Sameena Zehra and Pauline Eyre for the Home Safe Collective – An initiative set up to help vulnerable groups get home safely
2019	Fringe of Colour
2020	Edinburgh Festival Fringe cancelled due to the COVID-19 pandemic
2021	Edinburgh Festival Fringe in reduced scope due to the COVID-19 pandemic
2022	Best in Class
2023	A Show for Gareth Richards
2024	Rob Copland: Gimme (One With Everything)
2025	Comedy Club 4 Kids
2026	One Joke - Jonathan Oldfield, Lorna Rose Treen and Liebenspiel (Benjamin Alborough and Ellie BW)

== Acts with multiple Best Show nominations ==
=== 5 nominations ===
- Al Murray (won in 1999)
- James Acaster (5 nominations in consecutive years)

=== 4 nominations ===
- Kieran Hodgson

=== 3 nominations ===
- Ahir Shah (won in 2023)
- Russell Kane (won in 2010)
- Josie Long
- Adam Hills
- Sam Simmons (won in 2015)
- Spencer Jones

=== 2 nominations ===
- Larry Dean
- Merry Mac Fun Show
- Daniel Kitson (won in 2002)
- David O'Doherty (won in 2008)
- Garth Marenghi (won in 2001)
- Jeremy Hardy (won in 1988)
- Jordan Brookes (won in 2019)
- Nick Helm
- Nish Kumar
- Pappy's
- Phil Nichol (won in 2006)
- Rich Hall (won in 2000)
- Sarah Kendall (nominated in 2004 and 2015)
- Seann Walsh
- Simon Fanshawe (won in 1989)
- The Bodgers
- The Delightful Sausage
- Ian Smith

== See also ==
- Edinburgh Comedy Awards
- Edinburgh Festival Fringe
