= The Free Edinburgh Fringe Festival =

The Free Edinburgh Fringe Festival is a programme of free entry events that takes place at the Edinburgh Festival Fringe, the world's largest arts festival, each August. It is organised by the comedy promoter Laughing Horse, although it includes shows of different genres. It used to be affiliated with the Free Fringe when it was initially launched, but since 2007 has operated as a separate entity.

Free Edinburgh Fringe Festival venues are commonly independently run bars and nightclubs which create performance spaces in their premises for the duration of the Fringe Festival. Performers are allocated timeslots for free on the condition that they do not charge audiences an entry fee to watch the show. Although audience members are asked to make voluntary contributions at the end of the shows to help pay the performers expenses.

Generally, Edinburgh Fringe shows are self-financing. The average run at the fringe can cost a performer £5000 in venue hire fees, publicity and accommodation - the aim of The Free Festival is to provide performers and festival goers with a cheaper alternative.

Predominantly the shows are stand up comedy and sketch comedy, but the Free Edinburgh Fringe Festival also hosts theatre, cabaret, music, storytelling and children’s shows.

== Free Festival programme ==
The Free Festival promotes comedy, theatre, music, cabaret, opera, musicals, film, children’s shows, events and art displays – programmed by experienced producers in each area. Award winning performers and full runs of shows from the likes of Pappy’s Fun Club, John Gordillo, Lewis Schaffer, Nick Wilty, Sol Bernstein, Steve Day, Bob Slayer, Nik Coppin and Ivor Dembina have appeared in previous years, plus guest appearances in compilation shows from well known performers such as Alan Carr, Scott Capurro, Richard Herring, Brendon Burns, Marcus Brigstocke, Reg D. Hunter, Dan Antopolski and Paul Foot.

== Critical acclaim ==
The Free Festival has received coverage from Sky News, BBC, Culture Show, The Guardian, The Times, The Scotsman, The List, Metro, Chortle and many other local publications. In 2009 75% of Free Festival shows were reviewed 3 star and above, with thirty 4-star and 20 5-star reviews.

In 2022, Best in Class—a Free Fringe show since 2018—won the Edinburgh Comedy Awards Panel Prize.

Ahir Shah's Edinburgh shows on The Free Festival in 2017 and 2018 were both nominated for the Edinburgh Comedy Award.

Imran Yusuf's Free Festival show became the first non-ticketed show at the Edinburgh Festival to be nominated for a main Comedy Award for Best Newcomer.

In 2007 the BBC produced a radio comedy pilot based on Ian Fox's 2006 Free Fringe Show The Butterfly Effect.

== Free Festival Venues ==
Edinburgh venues that are part of the Free Edinburgh Fringe Festival as of 2023:

- 32 Below
- Bar 50
- Bar Soba
- Brass Monkey
- Cabaret Voltaire
- The City Cafe
- The Cocktail Mafia
- The Metropole Cafe
- The Reverie
- Three Sisters
- Laughing Horse Online
- The Argyle Bar
- The Counting House
- Dragonfly
- Dropkick Murphys
- Eastside
- EliminateTheImpossible.com
- The Hanover Tap
- Home Bar
- The Pear Tree
- The Raging Bull
- West Port Oracle

Previous venues:

- Berlin
- Ego
- Hillside
- Lindsay's
- Meridian
- The Outhouse
- The Blind Poet
- Edinburgh City Football Club
- Espionage
- The Hive
- Jekyll & Hyde
- The Meadow Bar
- The National Museum of Scotland
- The Newsroom
- St. Martins Church
- Cafe Renroc

== Heroes of Fringe ==
In 2011 Bob Slayer, a performer and previous booker for the Free Festival set up independent fringe promoter Heroes of Fringe in a former Free Festival venue: Heroes @ The Hive. The move was amicable and the two organisations maintain a working relationship. In 2013 Heroes added a second venue Heroes @ Bob & Miss Behave's Bookshop. Heroes shows have won three Malcolm Hardee Awards and been nominated for several other awards. In 2013 Adrienne Truscott won the Edinburgh Fringe Awards (formerly the Perrier) panel prize for spirit of the Fringe.

== See also ==
- Edinburgh Festival Fringe
- Edinburgh Festival
- Free Fringe
