= Jordan Brookes =

English comedian (born 1986)

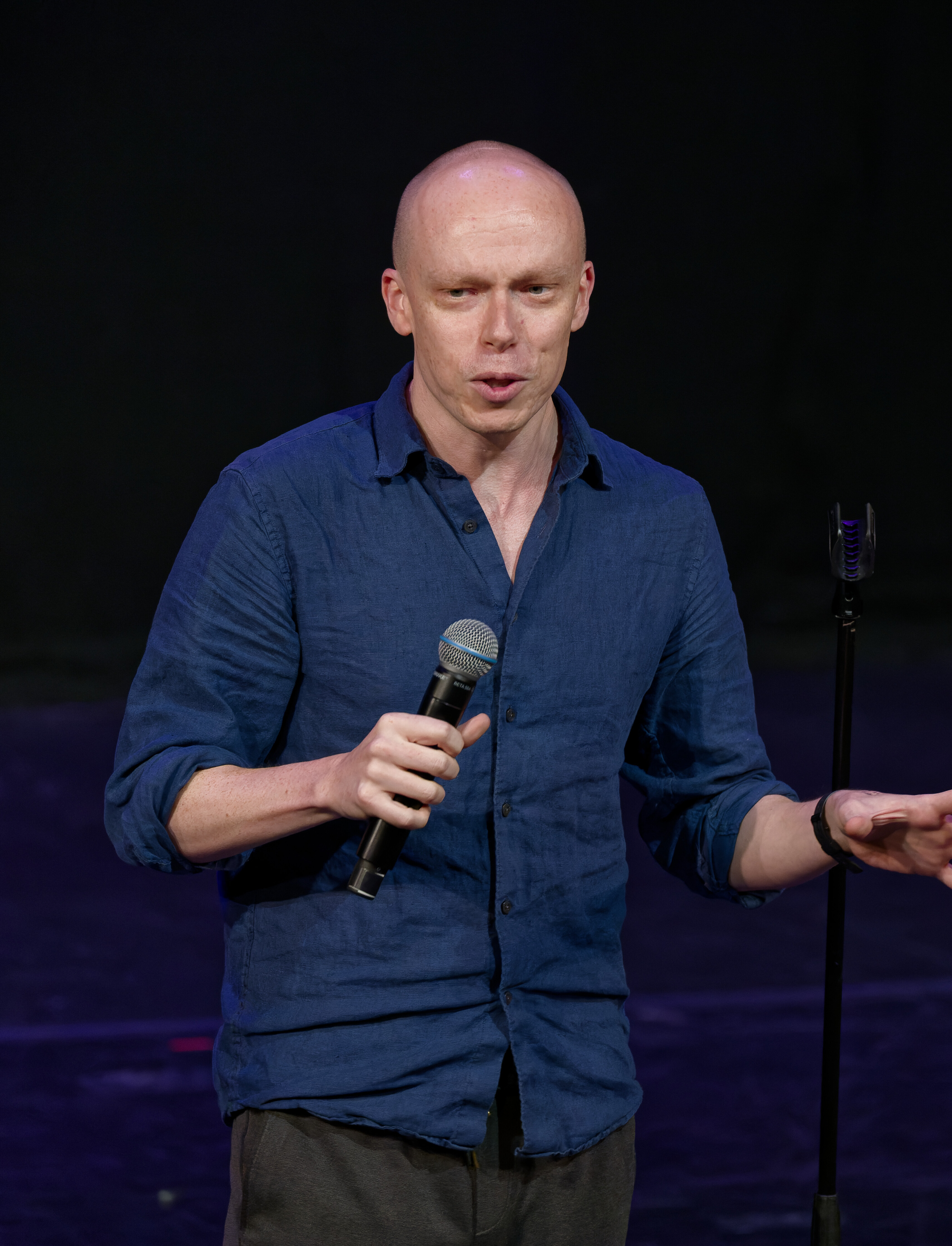
- Brookes at the 2024 Edinburgh Festival Fringe
- Born: 18 April 1986 (age 40); Merseyside
- Website: jordanbrookescomedy.com

Jordan Brookes (born 18 April 1986) is an Edinburgh Comedy Award-winning comedian.

Brookes was born and raised in Merseyside and spent his teenage years in Surrey. His grandfather was Bill Sellars, a producer and director best known for his work on BBC series such as All Creatures Great and Small and Triangle.

Brookes studied animation at the University of Wales, Newport and began stand-up comedy in Cardiff. He won the Welsh Unsigned Comedy Award in 2012.

He made his first appearance at the Edinburgh Festival Fringe in 2015. He was first nominated for the Edinburgh Comedy Award in 2017 for his show Body of Work. The following year he won the Comedians' Comedian award at the Chortle Awards. Then in 2019, he won the Main Prize at the Edinburgh Comedy Awards for his show I've Got Nothing which was described as "stand-up's answer to Waiting For Godot".

He has spoken of his admiration for stand-up Michael McIntyre, claiming he wanted to be "the existential Michael McIntyre, doing observational stuff but about disillusion, nihilism or sadness".

He has a habit of picking out critics such as Bruce Dessau and Dominic Maxwell in his audience and teasing them about the size of their notebook.

Year	Show	Venue	Awards
2015	Adventures in Limited Space	Just The Tonic at the Community Project	
2016	The Making Of	Laughing Horse at the Cellar Monkey	
2017	Body of Work	Pleasance Courtyard	Main Prize (nominated)
2018	Bleed	Pleasance Courtyard	
2019	I've Got Nothing	Pleasance Courtyard	Main Prize (won)
2022	This Is Just What Happens	Monkey Barrel	
2024	Fontanelle	Pleasance Dome	
2025	Until The Wheels Come Off	Pleasance Courtyard	
