= List of Edinburgh Festival Fringe venues =

This is a list of venues used at the Edinburgh Festival Fringe, the world's largest arts festival, which takes place in Edinburgh, Scotland each August. Many venues are known by different names during the rest of the year. For the purposes of this list they are given their "Fringe" name. Venues in italics were not in use during the last edition of the Fringe, but were used in previous years.

== The big four ==
Four venues have multiple performance spaces (sometimes in different locations) and put on a large number of shows each festival. They are known as the big four

- Assembly
- Gilded Balloon
- Pleasance
- Underbelly

== List of venues ==
Venue No.	Venue Name	First year	Last year	Notes
1	Edfringe Shop and Box Office |1958|			
2	Fringe Central			
3	Assembly George Square Gardens			
4	C Venues - C too			
5	The Stand Comedy Club 1 & 2			
6	C Venues - C Royale			
7	New Town Theatre			
8	George Square Theatre			
9	theSpace on Niddry St			
10	High Street, Cockburn Street to George IV Bridge			
11	Mayfield Salisbury Church			
12	The Stand Comedy Club 3 & 4			
13	Venue 13			
14	Gilded Balloon Teviot			
15	Traverse Theatre			
17	Assembly George Square Studios			
18	Sweet Grassmarket			
19	Royal Over-Seas League			
20	Assembly Rooms			
22	Dance Base			
23	Pleasance Dome			
25	BBC			
26	Summerhall			
27	Just the Tonic at the Community Project			
28	John Hope Gateway			
29	Paradise in The Vault			
30	Scottish Storytelling Centre			
31	John Knox House			
32	Bar Bados Complex			
33	Pleasance Courtyard			
34	C Venues - C			
35	Assembly Hall			
36	theSpace on North Bridge			
37	Bruntsfield Evangelical Church			
38	SpaceTriplex			
39	theSpace on the Mile			
40	Quaker Meeting House			
41	C Venues - C Primo			
43	theSpace @ Symposium Hall			
44	The Jam House			
45	theSpace @ Venue 45			
46	Scottish National Portrait Gallery			
47	Le Monde			
48	Edinburgh Central Mosque			
49	Bedlam Theatre			
50	C venues - C cubed			
51	Just the Tonic @ The Tron			
52	The Edinburgh Dungeon			
53	theSpace @ Surgeon's Hall			
55	The Mound Precinct			
56	Movement			
57	The Jazz Bar			
58	C venues - C south			
59	The Boards			
60	Canongate Kirk			
61	Underbelly Cowgate			
62	Captain's Bar			
64	Gilded Balloon at the Museum			
66	Scottish National Gallery of Modern Art			
67	Valvona & Crolla			
68	The Voodoo Rooms			
69	Coburg House Art Studios			
70	Edinburgh Academy			
72	Queen's Hall			
73	King's Hall			
74	Royal College of Physicians of Edinburgh			
76	Rose Theatre			
77	St. Cecilia's Hall			
78	The Canons' Gait			
79	Hispaniola			
82	Zoo Southside			
83	Inverleith St Serf's Church and Hall			
85	Laughing Horse @ City Cafe			
88	Just the Tonic @ The Caves			
89	The Montebar			
90	Brewhemia			
91	St Mary's Cathedral			
93	Laughing Horse @ The Newsroom			
94	Sweet Holyrood			
95	St Michael and All Saints' Church			
96	Opium			
98	Electric Circus			
99	The Outhouse			
100	Pilgrim			
101	Laughing Horse @ Finnegan's Wake			
104	Murrayfield Parish Church Centre			
105	Broughton St Mary's Church			
106	Laughing Horse @ Cuckoo's Nest			
107	Guildford Arms			
108	Meadowbank Sports Centre			
111	St Andrew's and St George's West Church			
112	Merchants' Hall			
114	Laughing Horse @ The Golf Tavern			
115	Necrobus			
119	The Principal			
120	Edinburgh Tabernacle			
121	Duddingston Kirk Manse Gardens			
122	St Cuthbert's Church			
124	ZOO			
125	artSpace@StMarks			
126	Edinburgh University Library			
127	St John's Church			
129	Alpha Art Gallery			
129	Tron Kirk			
130	The Photographic Exhibition Centre			
131	Greyfriars Kirk			
133	Blackwell's Bookshop			
134	Institut Français d’Ecosse			
135	The Adam Pottery			
138	Acoustic Music Centre @ UCC			
139	Assembly Roxy			
142	The Nomads Tent			
144	Edinburgh Printmakers			
146	Laughing Horse @ 48 Below			
147	National Library of Scotland			
148	Southsider			
149	Galerie Mirages			
150	Edinburgh International Conference Centre			
151	Laughing Horse @ Bar 50			
152	Paradise in Augustines			
156	Banshee Labyrinth			
158	Whistlebinkies			
161	The Globe Bar			
163	Lauriston Halls			
164	Laughing Horse @ Vic Street Coffee Co			
165	Grassmarket East			
167	Scottish Poetry Library			
169	Cannonball Restaurant & Bar			
170	Laughing Horse @ The Counting House			
171	CC Blooms			
173	The Biscuit Factory			
174	Smash			
176	Neal's Yard Remedies			
178	Beehive Inn			
179	National Museum of Scotland			
180	Burgers and Beers Grillhouse			
182	Scotch Malt Whisky Society			
183	Leith Volcano			
185	Laughing Horse @ Espionage			
187	St Giles' Cathedral			
188	Novotel			
189	Theatre Big Tops			
191	The Brunton			
197	St Vincent's Chapel, Edinburgh			
198	Dovecot Studios			
199	Edinburgh City Chambers			
205	White Stuff			
206	Rae Macintosh Musicroom			
207	Gallery 23			
208	Edinburgh Ski Club			
209	Greenside @ Nicolson Square			
210	Territorial Army Centre			
212	Heroes @ Bob's BlundaBus			
213	Black City of the Dead Signs			
214	Leith Depot			
215	Outside the Cigar Box			
216	Bonhams			
217	Greyfriars Bobby Bar			
218	Henry's Cellar Bar			
220	Laughing Horse @ Biddy Milligan's			
221	Fingers Piano Bar			
222	Scottish National Gallery			
223	Prestonfield House			
227	Kilderkin			
230	St Ninian's Church			
231	Greenside @ Royal Terrace			
234	Jeffrey St. Whisky & Tobacco			
235	Eric Liddell Centre			
236	Greenside @ Infirmary Street			
237	Alba Flamenca			
239	The Street			
241	Royal Scots Club			
244	Shillinghill Studios			
245	Charlotte Chapel			
246	WHISKI Bar & Restaurant			
248	Serenity Cafe			
251	The Life Room			
252	The Tron			
254	Palmerston Place Church			
255	Scott Monument			
257	Laughing Horse @ The Pear Tree			
259	Laughing Horse @ Hanover Tap			
260	theSpace @ Jury's Inn			
262	Mansfield Traquair Centre			
264	Laughing Horse @ Southside Social			
266	The Writers' Museum			
267	Old St Paul's			
268	Laughing Horse @ Southpour			
272	Laughing Horse @ The Free Sisters			
273	Saughtonhall United Reformed Church			
275	Stills: Centre for Photography			
276	The Liquid Room			
277	Riddle's Court			
282	Woodland Creatures			
283	Ciao Roma			
284	Leith St Andrew’s Church			
287	The Dome			
288	Just The Tonic @ The Mash House			
289	Laughing Horse @ Dropkick Murphy's			
290	Arthur Conan Doyle Centre			
293	Laughing Horse @ Cellar Monkey			
295	Central Hall			
297	Laughing Horse @ The Wee Pub			
299	Edinburgh Gallery			
300	Underbelly, George Square			
301	La Belle Angèle			
302	Underbelly Med Quad			
304	Frankenstein Pub			
309	The Royal Oak			
310	Scottish Arts Club			
311	Playfair Library			
313	Heroes @ The Hive			
314	Lush Spa Edinburgh			
315	Dynamic Earth			
317	Stockbridge Church			
318	Traverse Theatre @ Codebase			
319	Stand Comedy Club 5 & 6			
320	Pleasance Pop-Up: The Club			
321	Robin Chapel			
322	Assembly Checkpoint			
326	Royal College of Surgeons			
329	University of Edinburgh Centre for Research on Families and Relationships			
332	Laughing Horse @ Moriarty's			
333	Bourbon Bar			
334	VinCaffe			
336	Columcille Centre			
338	Laughing Horse @ Cabaret Voltaire			
339	Easter Road Stadium			
340	Drummond Community High School			
342	Stramash			
345	University of Edinburgh Business School			
347	Scotland Study Centre			
348	Téte-a-Téte Foto Studio			
349	Healthy Life Centre			
350	Acheson House Meeting Point – Calton Hill Steps			
354	Arthur's Seat			
356	Statue of Greyfriar's Bobby			
357	Bannermans			
358	Underbelly @ Potterrow			
359	Fruitmarket Gallery			
360	Underbelly's Circus Hub on the Meadows			
361	Book Lovers' Tour Departure			
363	Granny's Green Steps			
366	52 Canoes			
368	Royal Highland Centre			
369	Inverleith House			
374	Ocean Terminal			
375	Whitespace 76			
376	Krua Thai Cookery School			
377	Inveresk Lodge Garden			
378	The Greenhouse - by BoxedIn Theatre	2019		
380	Royal Botanic Gardens - West Gate			
383	Nightcap			
386	Raj Restaurant			
389	Outside 124 High Street			
390	Ravenscroft Studio			
396	E.D.S. Gallery			
397	Dalkeith Country Park			
399	Black Market			
402	Parliament House			
403	Edinburgh Festival Camping			
404	Custom Lane			
405	The Salvation Army Edinburgh City Corps			
408	St Patrick's Church			
410	Ghillie Dhu			
411	Paradise Palms			
412	G&V Royal Mile Hotel			
414	Heroes @ Dragonfly			
415	Natural Food Kafe			
419	Angels Share			
437	Sneaky Pete's			
441	Laughing Horse @ The Mockingbird			
444	Silk			
446	PASS Theatre			
448	Harvey Nichols			
458	Steel Coulson Southside Newington			
501	10 Rutland Square			
502	National Records of Scotland			
503	Black Medicine Basement Red Bar			
507	The Blue Easel Gallery			
508	Lochrin Belle			
509	99 Hanover Street			
510	Musselburgh Racecourse			
515	Heroes @ Monkey Barrel			
