= Free Fringe =

Arts organization

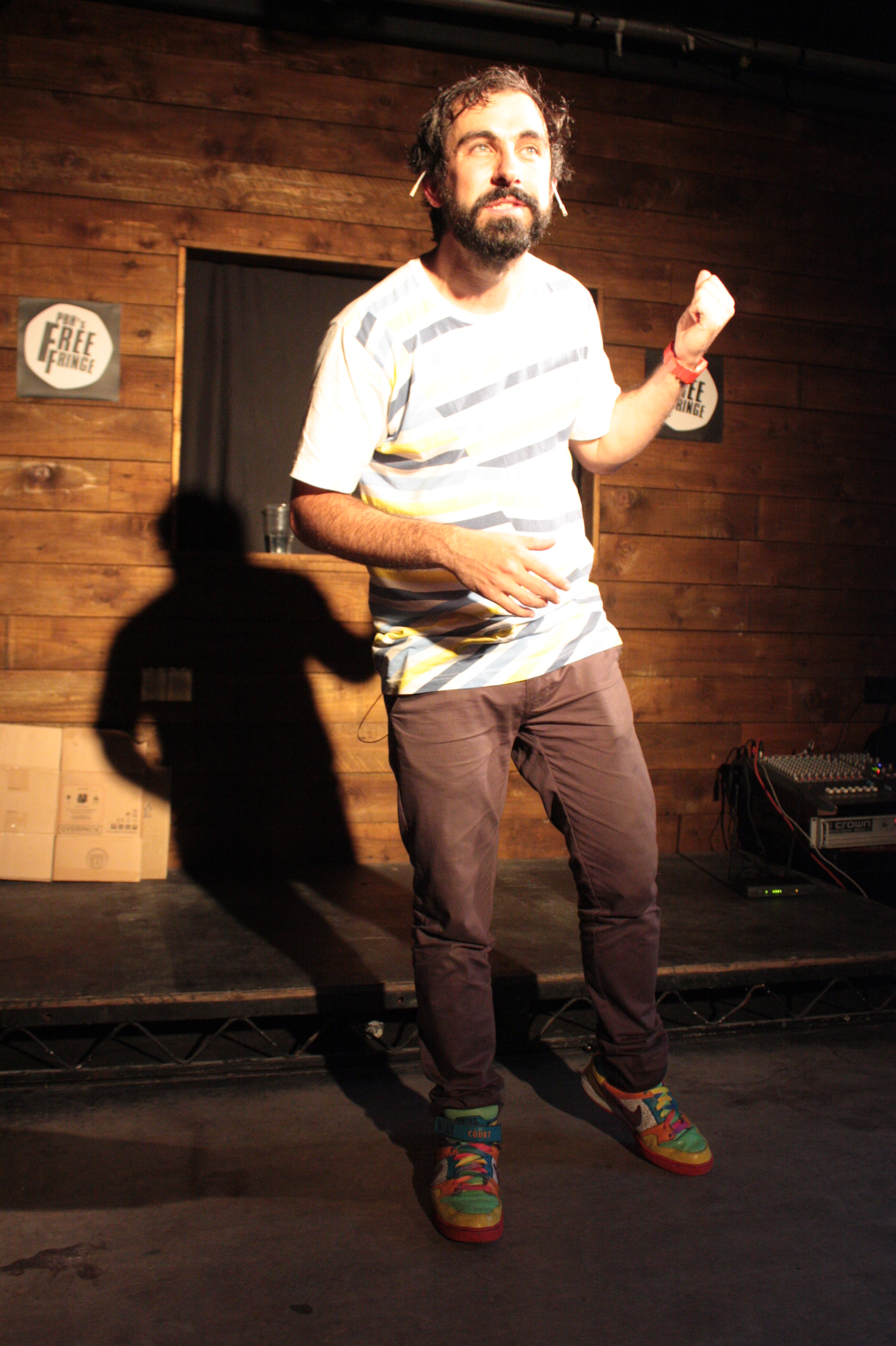
Yianni Agisilaou at the Free Fringe in Edinburgh, 2013

The Free Fringe (also known as PBH's Free Fringe, after its founder, Peter Buckley Hill) is an organisation that promotes free shows during the Edinburgh Festival Fringe, the world's largest arts festival, every August.

Unlike most event promoters at the Fringe, the Free Fringe does not charge performers for use of performance spaces, on the condition that they do not charge an entry fee into their shows. Audience members are, however, asked to make a donation at the end of a show.

This business model has been cited as an important development in the Fringe's culture and infrastructure, and has been credited with restoring the "idealistic spirit of the Fringe". Peter Buckley Hill was awarded the Panel Prize at the 2009 Edinburgh Comedy Awards in recognition.

The organisation should not be confused with other promoters of free events at the Fringe, which include Laughing Horse, Just the Tonic and Bob Slayer's Heroes. Free Fringe venues are commonly independently run bars and nightclubs which create performance spaces in their premises for the duration of the Fringe.

Predominantly the shows are comedy but the programme has expanded from its comedy roots to include magic, theatre, science, cabaret, music and spoken word. Performers range from newcomers to major names such as Phill Jupitus and established cult figures such as John Otway.

== History ==
The Free Fringe was started in 1996 by comedian Peter Buckley Hill with the show Peter Buckley Hill And Some Comedians. Buckley Hill had lost £4,000 as a performer at the 1994 Fringe. The venues used by the Free Fringe have increased since 1996 from the original Footlights and Firkin venue to (in 2015) 529 free shows on 59 stages - over 9,260 performances.

From 2004, Buckley Hill worked with the team behind comedy promoters Laughing Horse on promoting Free Fringe shows. However, the partnership ended in 2006. After the split, the two parties operated separate programmes under the "free" banner - Buckley Hill continuing to bill his programme the "Free Fringe", with the Laughing Horse adopting the name the Free Edinburgh Fringe Festival.

By 2009, PBH's Free Fringe had 176 shows at 19 venues, a growth of 50% in a year.

In 2014, John Kearns won the Edinburgh Comedy Awards main prize with his Free Fringe show, having previously won Best Newcomer in the previous year. In 2016, Richard Gadd won the Edinburgh Comedy Award for his show Monkey See, Monkey Do.

Buckley Hill stepped down from managing the festival in 2016.

=== Gallery ===
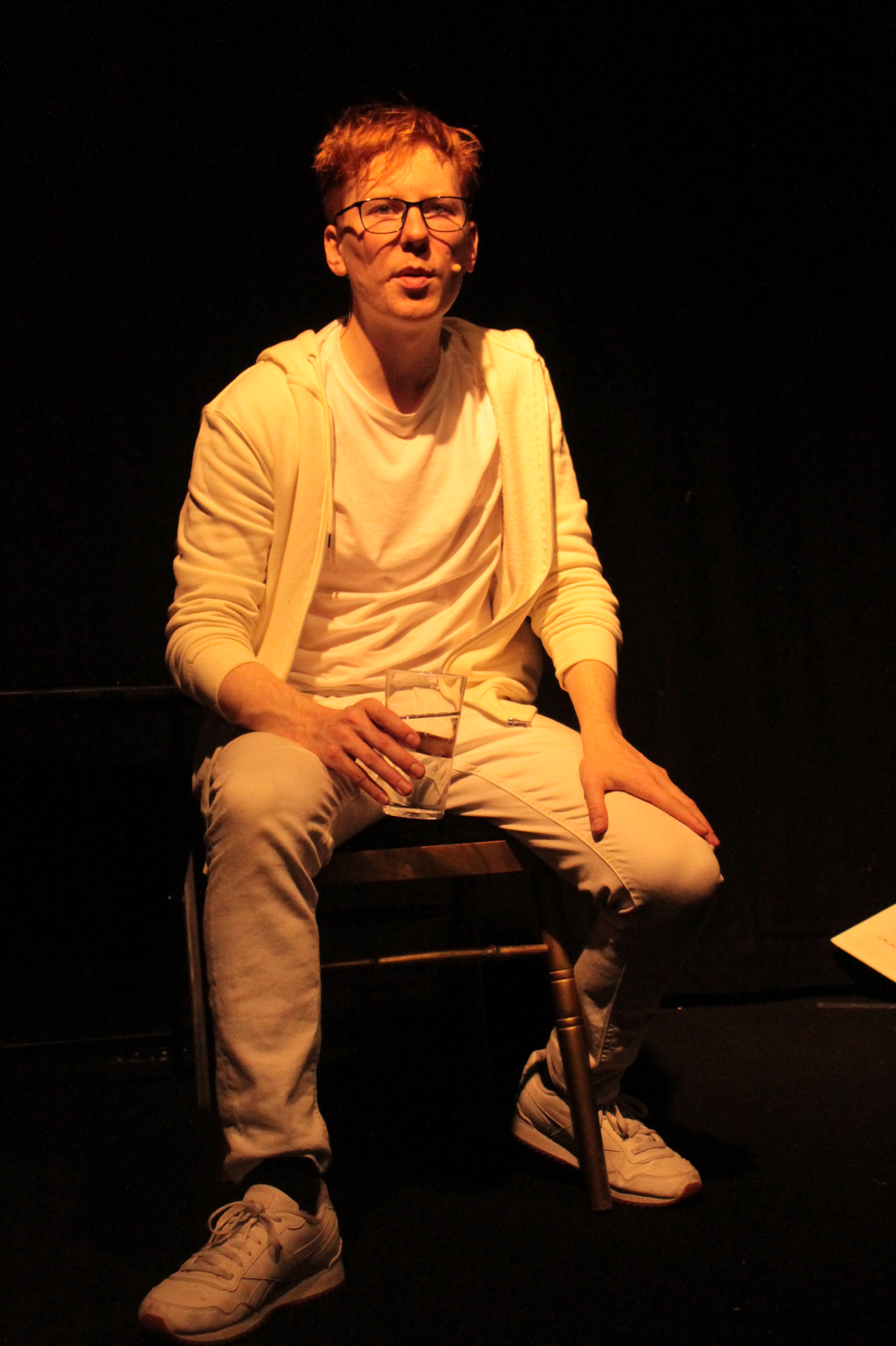
David Alnwick at the Edinburgh Free Fringe, 2022

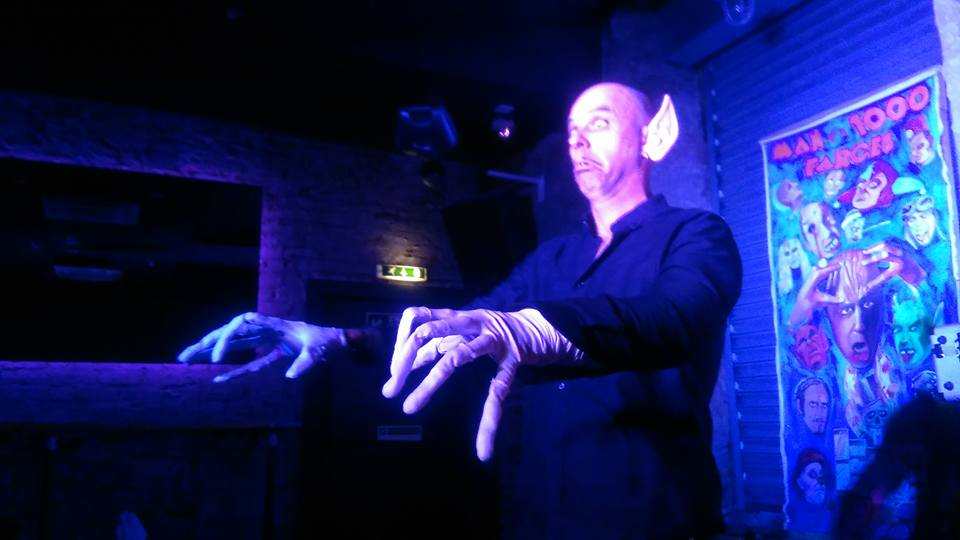
Johnny MacAulay as Nosferatu in The Man of 1000 Farces, Edinburgh Free Fringe

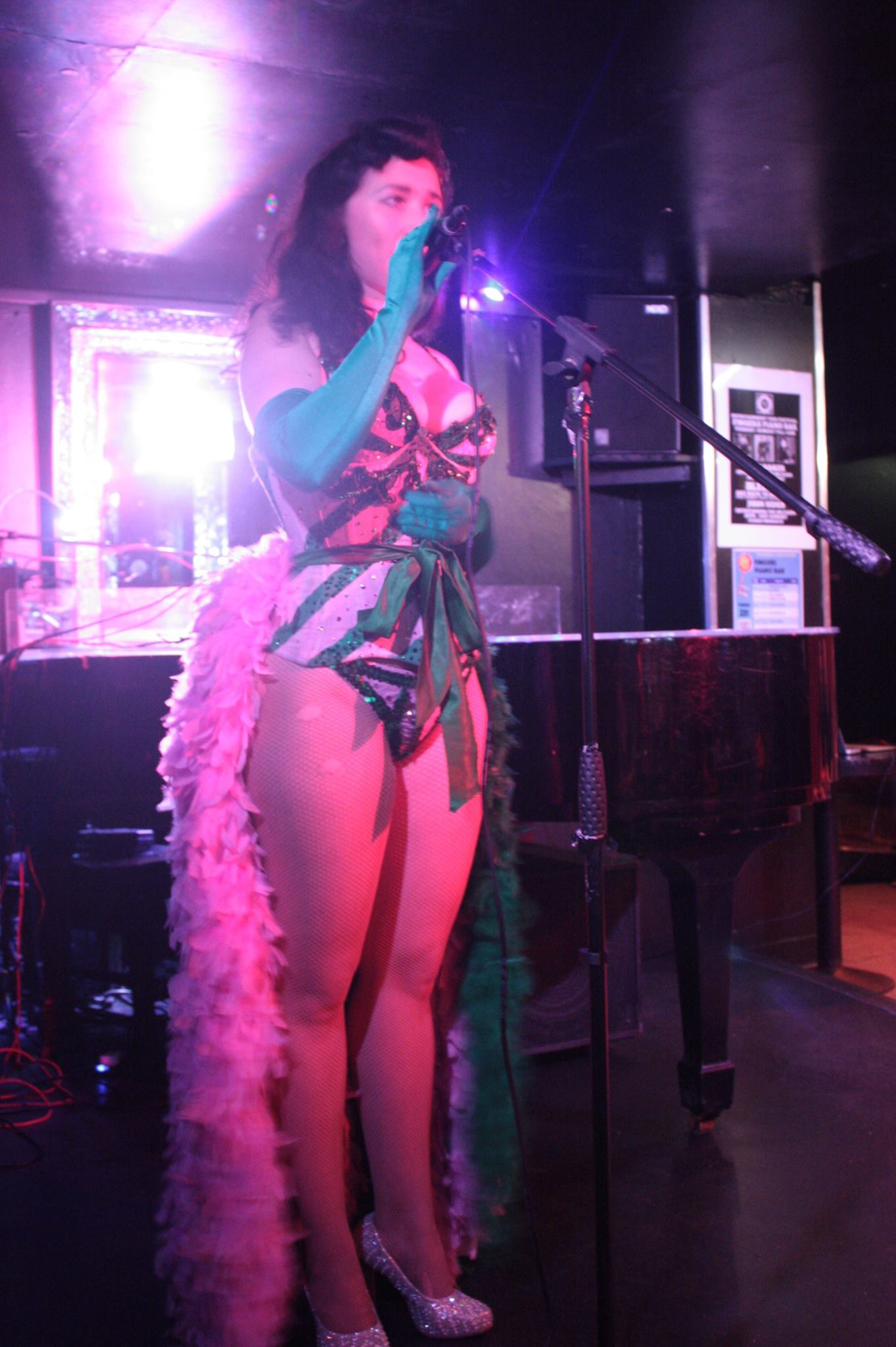
Elsie Diamond in a cabaret show, Edinburgh Free Fringe

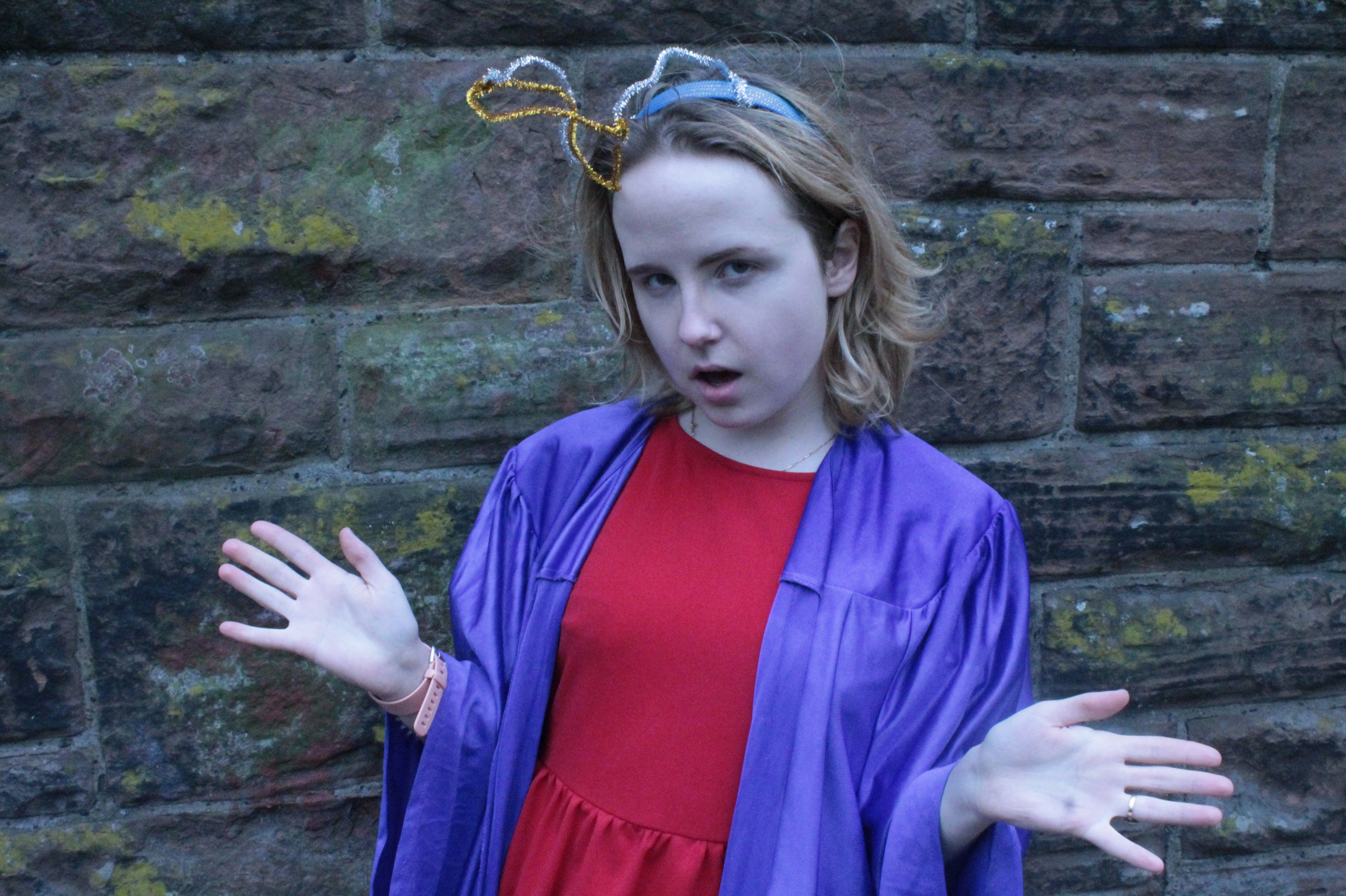
Angel Baby (Victoria Watson) at the PBH Free Fringe, 2024

== Locations ==
Both Free Fringe companies focus on venues in Edinburgh's Old Town, especially the Cowgate and its side streets, PBH has a strong presence on Niddry Street but also a satellite group at Picardy Place and extending down Leith Walk.

== Awards ==
Since 1996, the Free Fringe has won several awards including:

- Tap Water Awards: Spirit of the Fringe 2006
- Chortle Award for Innovation 2007
- Chortle Award for Best Off—Stage Contribution 2007
- Three Weeks: Editor's Choice Award

Additionally, in 2009, Peter Buckley Hill won the Edinburgh Comedy Awards Panel Prize, in recognition of his work on the Free Fringe. He was also nominated for the Malcolm Hardee Award for Comic Originality in 2008 and in the "Most Likely To Make A Million Quid" category at the 2014 Malcolm Hardee Awards, where organisers said he would have won the "Least Likely To Win A Million Quid" Award

The Free Fringe has been described as 'the true spirit of the Fringe' by comedian Sean Lock.

== Controversies ==
In 2015, there was a dispute between PBH's Free Fringe and rival promoters Freestival over the Cowgatehead venue. Freestival believed they had secured the lease for the building and booked a full programme of over 120 events. After the Fringe brochure deadline, by which time most acts had already paid to register their show, PBH Free Fringe announced that they had secured the building and would be booking a programme of their own. Peter Buckley-Hill stated that he would consider applications from Freestival acts if they agreed to the Free Festival "Ethos and Conditions", which forbid being a permanent member of a show in any rival free venue. The majority of shows were eventually rehoused in venues organised by Just the Tonic and Laughing Horse.

Later in 2015, Stephen Carlin was ejected from the Free Fringe and not allowed to continue his run at The Canon's Gait when the Free Fringe organisers realised that he also had a permanent role in a play at a Laughing Horse show. This action was against the PBH Terms and Conditions that Carlin had previously agreed to.

In 2016, Peter Buckley Hill issued an instruction that Free Fringe acts could not use flyering companies which also promoted other free shows, saying that "by using a service that leaflets for both without distinction, you are endorsing their tactics of riding on our coat-tails and taking our credit".

== See also ==
- Free Edinburgh Fringe Festival, The Free Festival
