= Abby Wambaugh =

American comedian based in Copenhagen

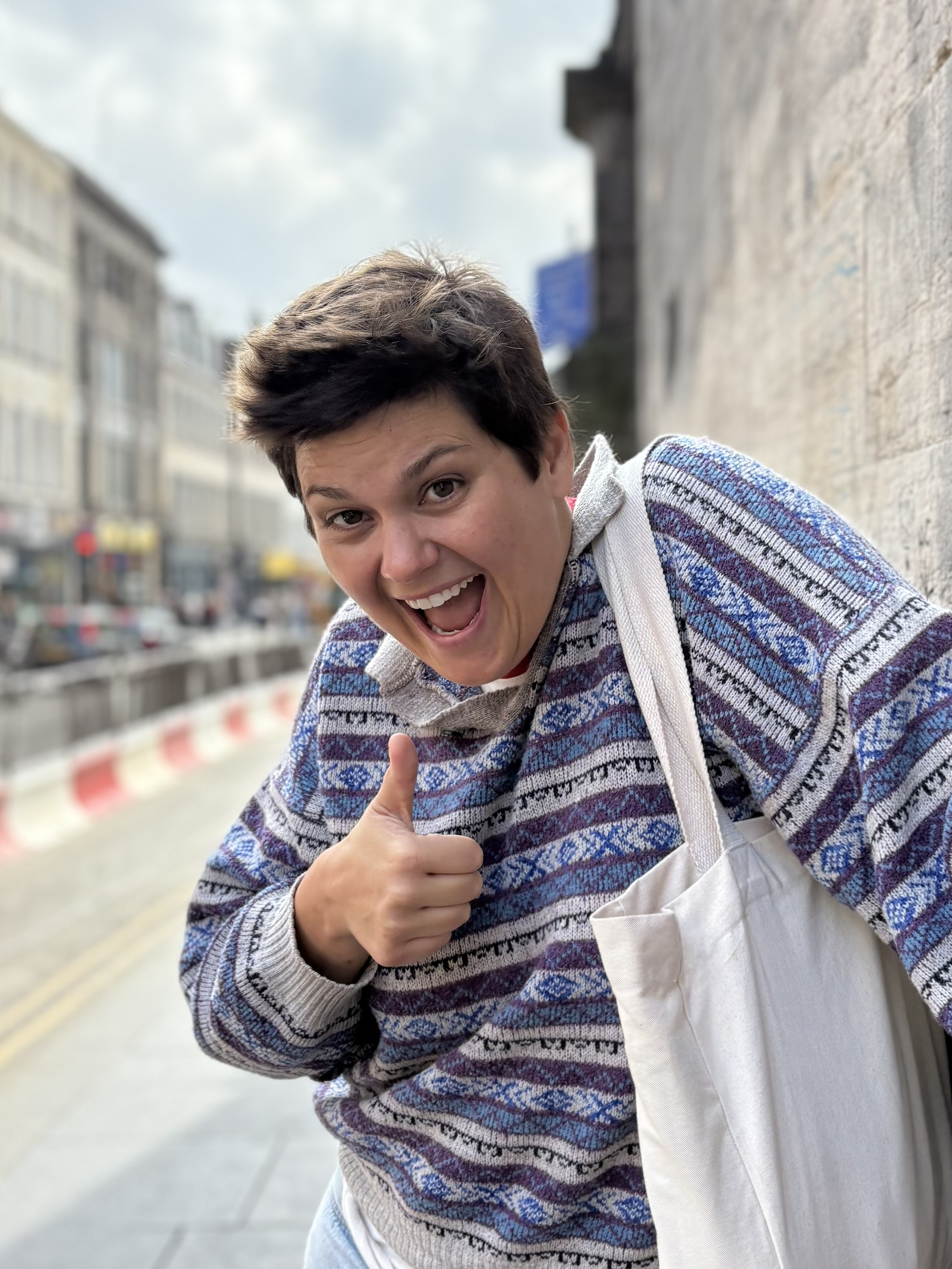
- Abby Wambaugh at the Edinburgh Fringe Festival 2026
- Education: Long Island University
- Notable work: The First 3 Minutes of 17 Shows

Comedy career
- Years active: 2021–present
- Website: abbywambaugh.com

Abby Wambaugh is an American stand-up comedian, writer, and director based in Copenhagen, Denmark. She frequently performs in the United Kingdom.

== Early life and education ==
Wambaugh is from Pennsylvania. Wambaugh graduated with a BA in Humor and Social Change from Long Island University in 2008. She ran a summer camp in Brooklyn before beginning her comedy career.

== Career ==
After performing stand-up "around eight times", Wambaugh was a finalist for the Funny Women Stage Award in 2021. In 2022, she was shortlisted for the BBC New Comedy Awards, and appeared on the BBC's Comedians vs. the News.

In 2023, Wambaugh appeared on BBC programmes Arts Hour International Comedy Show. She was selected for the Pleasance Comedy Reserve and performed at the Edinburgh Fringe Festival alongside Li Jin Hao, Will Robbins, and Kyrah Gray.

The following year, Wambaugh debuted the showThe First 3 Minutes of 17 Shows at Edinburgh Fringe 2024 and received positive critical reception. It utilised a structure of miniature sketches and was described by The Guardian as "a masterpiece of construction".

Wambaugh won the ISH Comedy Award for Best Newcomer, European Comedy Award for Best Show, Theatre Weekly's Best of the Fest and Best Comedy, and On The Mic: Best Ticketed Show. She was also nominated for Edinburgh Comedy Awards Best Newcomer, Comedian's Choice Awards Best Newcomer, and Next Up Comedy Best Show.

The First 3 Minutes of 17 Shows returned to Edinburgh Fringe in 2025 before touring to London, Los Angeles, Adelaide, and Melbourne International Comedy Festival, where she was nominated for Most Outstanding Show. In October 2025, the show had a four-week off-Broadway run at the Dixon Place theater in New York City, presented by Hannah Gadsby.

From 2023 to 2024, Wambaugh co-hosted the weekly podcast Coping in Copenhagen with comedians Owen O'Sullivan and Marius Lathey, an English-language podcast about living in Denmark. Wambaugh has co-hosted Help Hole, a podcast discussing self-help books, with Sophie Hagen since 2024.

Abby has a long-running creative collaboration with the comedian Lara Ricote, who has described Wambaugh as her "soul collaborator". Ricote directed The First 3 Minutes of 17 Shows, and Wambaugh directed Ricote's 2026 show Inkling, which was nominated for the Edinburgh Comedy Award for Best Show, and long-listed for the ISH Comedy Award for Best Show. They currently co-host the podcast Rala and Baby: The Big Idea.

Wambaugh directed Marty Gleeson's debut show Dog Ear at Edinburgh Fringe 2026, which won the Edinburgh Comedy Award for Best Newcomer and the Comedian’s Choice Award for Best Newcomer. It was also nominated for the ISH Comedy Award for Best Newcomer.

== Personal life ==
Wambaugh identifies as a non-binary woman, a subject she explored in the 2022 audio project Mombinary. Wambaugh lives in Copenhagen with her Danish partner and their two children. She has a dog named Bobby.

In October 2020, Wambaugh experienced a late-stage miscarriage, and decided to do stand-up comedy while waking up from anesthesia.
