= Bruce Morton =

Bruce Morton may refer to:

- Bruce Morton (comedian), Scottish comedian, playwright and actor
- Bruce Morton (journalist) (1930–2014), American journalist and television news correspondent
- Bruce Morton (mathematician) (1926–2012), Australian/New Zealand applied mathematician
