= Prague International Festival of Comedy =

The Prague International Festival of Comedy (PIFCO) is the largest international comedy festival in the Czech Republic. Established in 2018, it takes place annually in Prague over ten days, typically running through the first ten days of November. Performances are held in venues throughout the city. The PIFCO follows the steps of the PRAHAha International Comedy Festival, which took place in 2016, hosting 53 artists both from the Czech Republic and abroad. The festival was a huge success, nevertheless it was only a one-time event. The PIFCO plays host to a plethora of local and international artists; in 2018 the festival will list 29 shows, (including 4 free performances) by 50 artists. Although it is mainly a vehicle for stand-up and cabaret acts, the festival has also included sketch shows, improvisational theatre, debates, musical shows and workshops.

== 2016 Edition ==
One of the Festival Venues

2016 Festival Performers

Petr "Nasty" Cerha facing chirps

The international festival was organized by the endowment fund “Nadační Fond Comedy in Prague,“ a nonprofit trust in accordance with Czech Law. Its mission was to provide a humorous, international, and multilingual cultural exchange where people from different countries, backgrounds & ages meet and connect through comedy.

The festival welcomed more than 4,500 guests in several venues around Prague, attracting both tourists and residents of Prague. Audience members were of all ages and nationalities, with a strong focus on comedy, travel, and other cultures.

57 comedians coming from 17 different countries were performing in three different languages (Czech, German, English). The headliners were Andrew Maxwell, Alfred Dorfer and Lars Reichow.

The festival director was Lynn Tourki, a small person loving witty humor and sarcasm.

=== Czech Shows ===
(Czech Republic) Adéla Elbel	(Czech Republic) Arnošt Frauenberg	(Czech Republic) Dominik Heřman Lev	(Czech Republic) Ester Kočičková
(Czech Republic) Jakub Žáček	(Czech Republic) Jiří Harnach	(Czech Republic) Karel Hynek	(Czech Republic) Lucie Macháčková
(Czech Republic) Martin Vasquez	(Czech Republic) Ondřej "En.Dru" Havlík	(Czech Republic) Pavel Tomeš	(Czech Republic) Petr "Nasty" Cerha
(Czech Republic) Petr Vydra	(Czech Republic) Radek Petráš	(Czech Republic) Vojta Záveský	

=== German Shows ===
(Austria) Alfred Dorfer	(Germany) Caroline Ebner	(Germany) Lars Reichow	(Germany) Christian Schulte-Loh
(Germany) Frank Smilgies	(Germany) Norbert Bürger	(Germany) Sebastian Rüger	(Germany) Urban Priol

=== English Shows ===
(Argentina) Adrián Minkowicz	(Australia) Yianni Agisilaou	(Bulgaria) Ivan Kirkov	(Canada) David Tsonos
(South Africa) Mark Palmer	(Denmark) Sophie Hagen	(Republic of Ireland) Andrew Maxwell	(Republic of Ireland) Ryan McDonnell
(France) Marcel Lucont	(United Kingdom) Zoe Lyons	(United Kingdom) Becky Brunning	(United Kingdom) Carly Smallmann
(United Kingdom) Charmaine Davies	(United Kingdom) Dave Thompson	(United Kingdom) Gareth Berliner	(United Kingdom) Geoff Whiting
(United Kingdom) Jason Patterson	(United Kingdom) John Gordillo	(United Kingdom) Joseph Wilson	(United Kingdom) Mark Meier
(United Kingdom) Matt Price	(United Kingdom) Matthew Bayliss	(United Kingdom) Maureen Younger	(United Kingdom) Nathan Caton
(United Kingdom) Simon Feilder	(United Kingdom) Tamar Broadbent	(United Kingdom) Tom Toal	(Greece) Johnny Kats
(Hungary) Péter Felméri	(Poland) Kris Szumowski	(Poland) Marcin Stempień	(Poland) Peter Szumowski
(Romania) Isac Radu	(Russia) Anastasia Goncharuk		

== 2018 Edition ==
The Festival is currently being planned. More updates will be available very soon.

== Awards ==
As of 2018, the PIFCO ends its run by recognizing the most outstanding show and performer with an award for his or her outstanding lifetime achievement to comedy. The award is presented to the best act as selected by a special committee and festival sponsors

== See also ==
- Edinburgh Festival Fringe
- Just for Laughs
- Quatsch Comedy Club
- Designblok
