= The Comeback King =

- Theatrical release poster
- Directed by: Judd Apatow
- Written by: Judd Apatow; Glen Powell
- Produced by: Judd Apatow; Glen Powell; Dan Cohen; Kevin Misher
- Starring: Glen Powell; Cristin Milioti; Madelyn Cline; Stavros Halkias; Li Jin Hao; Leanne Morgan; Kumail Nanjiani; Vanessa Bayer; Atsuko Okatsuka; Tig Notaro; Chris Fleming; Mike Birbiglia; Big Fella
- Cinematography: Eric Steelberg
- Music by: Theodore Shapiro
- Production companies: Apatow Productions; Barnstorm Entertainment; Misher Films
- Distributed by: Universal Pictures
- Release date: February 5, 2027
- Country: United States
- Language: English

The Comeback King is an upcoming American comedy film directed by Judd Apatow and co-written by Apatow and Glen Powell, who stars in the main role alongside Cristin Milioti, Madelyn Cline, Stavros Halkias, Jin Hao Li, Vanessa Bayer, Tig Notaro, and Kumail Nanjiani.

The Comeback King is scheduled to be released in the United States on February 5, 2027, by Universal Pictures.

== Premise ==
Aubrey King used to have it all – musical talent, country music stardom, and a gorgeous pop-superstar girlfriend. But a false online rumour that he cheated on her throws Aubrey's career into freefall. To pick up the pieces, Aubrey's manager advises him to leave the spotlight and build his comeback from the ground up, among the one group that hasn't rejected him, by returning to college to earn his long-abandoned degree.

== Cast ==
- Glen Powell as Aubrey King
- Cristin Milioti as Sam, a professor at Aubrey's college
- Madelyn Cline as Missy, Aubrey's pop-star ex-girlfriend
- Stavros Halkias as Aubrey's manager
- Jin Hao Li as Jeff, Aubrey's roommate
- Vanessa Bayer
- Tig Notaro
- Kumail Nanjiani
- Leanne Morgan
- Atsuko Okatsuka
- Chris Fleming
- Mike Birbiglia
- Big Fella
- Jillian Evanoff
- Kasey Short
- Jelly Roll as himself
- Reba McEntire as herself
- Shaboozey as himself
- Luke Bryan as himself
- Brad Paisley as himself
- Miranda Lambert as herself
- Brandi Carlile as herself
- Chris Stapleton as himself
- Megan Moroney as herself

== Production ==
In April 2025, it was announced that Judd Apatow would co-write a comedy with Glen Powell for Universal Pictures. Apatow later stated that Powell and himself had started writing it in 2024 with Apatow adding: "it’s been really funny just being in the foxhole with him and he really makes me laugh". In January 2026, Cristin Milioti and Madelyn Cline joined the cast. In March 2026, Stavros Halkias and Jin Hao Li joined the cast.

Principal photography began on April 6, 2026. In April 2026, the title was revealed as The Comeback King. In May 2026, the rest of the cast was announced.

On June 7, 2026, a scene for The Comeback King was filmed during the closing night of the 2026 CMA Fest at Nissan Stadium. Powell appeared in character before the festival audience to film a concert sequence featuring his character, a declining country music star named King. The appearance was not announced in advance and was presented as a surprise for concert attendees. It also filmed in Macon, Georgia, Evans County, Georgia, and Savannah, Georgia in April and June.

== Release ==
The film is scheduled to be released in the United States by Universal Pictures on February 5, 2027.
