= The Brass Band =

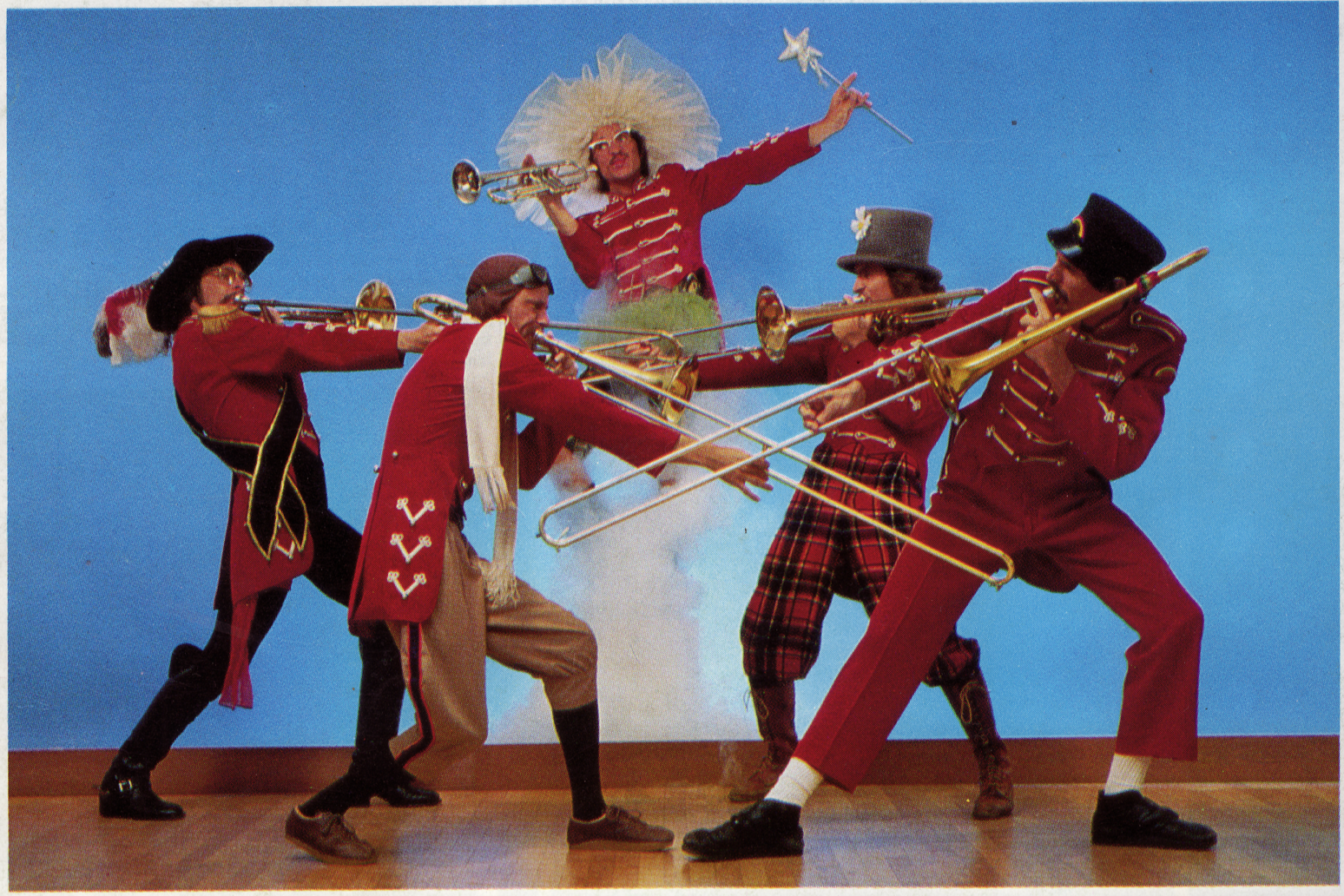
The Brass Band performing "Sabre Dance" by Aram Khachaturian. Performers left to right - The Captain, Jimby, Loois Tooloose, Fritz Frumheimer, Buford

The Brass Band were an American musical comedy troupe, based in San Francisco, who won the Edinburgh Comedy Award in 1984. They comprised five members - Loois Tooloose, Jimby, Fritz van der Vol (or Frumheimer), The Captain and Buford (Phineas T Buford III).

Van der Vol (real name Johannes Mager) played the tuba, The Captain (real name Bob Jennings) played the trombone, Buford (George Wallace) played the baritone horn, Jimby (Jim Aron) and Loois Tooloose (Bob Leach) both played the trumpet. Often they would play lengths of garden hose with mouthpieces attached. They wore costumes which collectively formed a band uniform. Aron, for example, wore an aviator's helmet. They each adopted distinct personas. For example, Van der Vol was the center of attention, the Captain was the straight man and Loois, Jimby and Buford were Van der Vol's main foils.

All were classical musicians. Mager and Aron were involved in avant-garde or "New Music", while Leach and Aron also had backgrounds in jazz and rock. Their act was described by the Los Angeles Times as "an antic blend of in-your-face street theater, sublime musical warblings and a few other spices" and "as if the Marx Brothers, stoned to the gills on laughing gas, decided they'd have a stab at playing a transcription of a Bach toccata. While dancing."

They formed in 1971, starting out as straight musicians. They began to lampoon themselves between gigs which led to comedy. They were hired as a street group to play period music at the San Francisco Dickens Fair. They were each expected to dress as a character from a Dickens novel and to affect an English accent. They were unable to take this seriously, and dismayed organizers with their rendition of Blue Moon. The comedy routine became so popular they ended up on stage." In 1980, an Australian producer named John Pinder booked them for a five-month tour of the country, with many performances at The Last Laugh in Melbourne. They broke box office records, and follow-up engagements arose in London, Boston, several cities in Canada and back in San Francisco. Then in 1984, they played the Edinburgh Festival Fringe, winning the Edinburgh Comedy Award (then known as the Perrier). Not finding a strong following in America, they continued to mainly play overseas, primarily in Australia, Europe and Japan.

In later years, they began naming their show "Tour de Farce", taking the name from a comment by a reviewer. Still, they kept their original namesake of "The Brass Band." Buford left, and classically-trained euphonium player Kevin Linscott joined as "Waldo Chompski".

The band went on hiatus in 1991 after a final tour of Japan, due to unforeseen pressures and family matters. They briefly re-united in 1994 to play Harvest Festivals along the West Coast, and through cities in Nevada and Arizona.

Leach died on Christmas Eve 2016 from Lou Gehrig's disease.

George Wallace died on July 11, 2026.

== Recordings ==
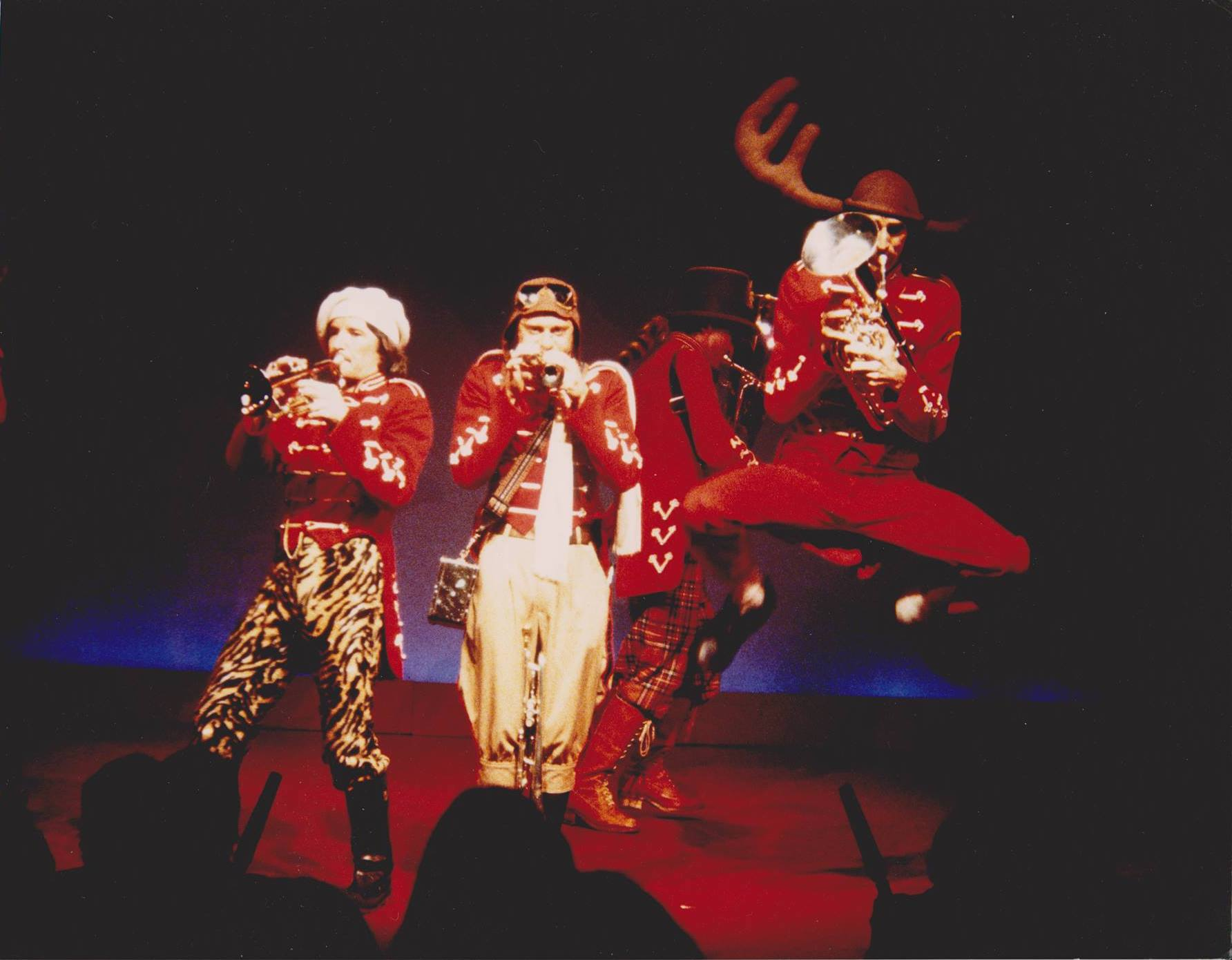
The Brass Band performing live at The Last Laugh in Melbourne, Australia. Buford is captured mid-jump while Frumheimer prances around behind him, Jimby, and Loois.

In 1977, they released a 7" single version of Rossini's William Tell Overture and Scott Joplin's Peacherine Rag.

In Australia, they recorded another 7", Rocky Meets Moose and The Stars and Stripes Forever, and a full live album, Just A Tiny Boo-Boo . . . The Brass Band Live In Australia

Back in America in 1984, they released another single, The Russians Aren't Coming (The Russians Aren't Coming), a satirical song about the Russian's withdrawal from the 1984 Summer Olympics.

Three years later in 1987, they released another live album, Live and in Debt - recorded at the Westwood Playhouse (currently known as the Geffen Playhouse) in Los Angeles.
