= Sam Nicoresti =

British comedian

- Nicoresti at the 2026 Edinburgh Fringe Festival
- Born: 1993 or 1994 (age 32–33)
- Education: University of Sheffield
- Website: samnicoresti.com

Sam Nicoresti is a British comedian. She won the Edinburgh Comedy Award for Best Show in 2025.

== Career ==
While studying at the University of Sheffield, Nicoresti formed a three-person sketch comedy troupe called Staple/Face with fellow students Tom Burgess and Michael Bentley. In 2013, the trio won Best New Sketch Act at the inaugural So You Think That's Funny? competition, described by Nicoresti as the "sketch arm of the prestigious and fame-breaking 'So You Think You're Funny?' at the Gilded Balloon". Staple/Face disbanded in 2014, and Nicoresti formed a double act called Sam & Tom with Burgess; Sam & Tom took shows to the Edinburgh Festival Fringe in 2017 and 2018. Nicoresti also performed a solo show, Bedtime, in 2018, and another, UFO, the following year.

In 2021, Nicoresti was named the Leicester Square Theatre New Comedian of the Year. Her 2022 show, Cancel Anti Wokeflake Snow Culture, was a parody of "edgelord" comedians; she went on to perform the show in a run at the Soho Theatre in March 2023. In 2024, a recording of the show was uploaded to YouTube under the shortened name Wokeflake.

At the 2025 Edinburgh Festival Fringe, Nicoresti's show Baby Doomer, which "discusses a recent mental health wobble and a gender transition", was awarded The Taffner Family Best Comedy Show at the Edinburgh Comedy Awards. She is the first transgender winner in the history of the awards. In October 2026, Nicoresti's Baby Doomer show also won her the Sky Arts Award for Comedy.

== Personal life ==
Nicoresti is from Birmingham.

Nicoresti is transgender. (Note: Nicoresti uses the pronouns she/her and they/them. This article uses she/her for consistency.)
