= Dominic Holland =

English actor and comedian (born 1967)

- Born: Dominic Anthony Holland; 6 May 1967 (age 59); London, England
- Education: Leeds University
- Occupations: Actor; comedian; author; broadcaster
- Years active: 1991–present
- Spouse: Nicola Frost (m. 1994)
- Children: 4, including Tom
- Relatives: Zendaya (daughter-in-law)
- Website: dominichollandbooks.com

Dominic Anthony Holland (born 6 May 1967) is an English actor, comedian, author, and broadcaster. He won the 1993 Perrier Best Newcomer Award at the Edinburgh Festival Fringe. His BBC Radio 4 series, The Small World of Dominic Holland (a reference to his 5'6" height), won a Comic Heritage Award.

== Early life and family ==
Holland was born in Brent, London, the son of Teresa (née Quigley) and John Holland. His father was from the Isle of Man and his mother is Irish American. Raised Catholic, he attended the Cardinal Vaughan Memorial School. He later studied textile management at Leeds University, where he met his future wife, photographer Nicola Frost. He has four sons, including actor Tom Holland.

He is a fan of Brentford F.C., stating on his website: "When I was a kid, I didn't miss a Brentford home game for five years or so."

== Career ==
In 1990 and 1991, a young Holland spent evenings presenting a radio show on Radio North Mid, North Middlesex University Hospital's internal radio station. This helped build his confidence as he moved to bigger stages.

=== Stand-up comedy ===
Holland started performing stand-up comedy in 1991, making his debut at The Comedy Café, Rivington Street, London. In 1993, he was briefly managed by Eddie Izzard. In Holland's first year at the Edinburgh Fringe his one-man show won the Perrier Best Newcomer award and good notices. Later in the autumn of 1993, Holland supported Izzard on his national tour. In 1994, Holland returned to Edinburgh. In 1996, his show at the Edinburgh festival was nominated for the Perrier Award. Holland returned to the Edinburgh festival in 2006. In October 2012, Holland recorded his first stand up DVD at the Court Theatre in Tring.

The Sunday Times described Holland as "The UK's master of observational comedy" and The Daily Telegraph commented that "he is a top notch stand up who everyone should see". Bob Monkhouse called him "Britain's funniest not yet famous comedian".

=== Television ===
Holland made his TV debut appearance in 1993 on Central Television's Lafter Hours with Harry Hill. He was a team captain for two series of Bring Me the Head of Light Entertainment for Channel Five – with Graham Norton hosting in 1998. In 1999 and 2000, Holland appeared twice as a guest on Have I Got News for You (as well as being its regular warm-up act), They Think It's All Over, and in 2000, The Royal Variety Performance. He has appeared on Rob Brydon's Annually Retentive. He has been a regular panellist on the daytime debate show The Wright Stuff.

Holland has made numerous guest appearances on numerous television shows, including The Clive James Show, The Brian Conley Show, Des O'Connor Tonight, and Never Mind the Buzzcocks. He has written for the animated British sitcom, Warren United, originally titled The Wild World of Warren, produced for ITV by Baby Cow Productions. Six episodes were made, two of which co-written by Holland.

=== Radio ===
Holland's first foray into radio was on hospital radio when he joined North Middlesex Hospital's radio station, Radio North Mid in 1990.

The Small World of Dominic Holland was a radio programme written and presented by Holland, featuring his stand-up work and sketches. One series of the show was commissioned in 2000. This was first broadcast on BBC Radio 4 and won a Comic Heritage Award. It has been repeated on BBC 7.

His second radio series on Radio 4, Holland's Shorts. was a series of comic monologues written and performed by Holland. In 2011, he appeared on Radio 4's The News Quiz, hosted by Sandi Toksvig. Holland was co-writer of Hal, a 2017 sitcom commissioned by BBC Radio 4, that starred Hal Cruttenden, in which Holland also appeared. He also made regular appearances in the early seasons of BBC Radio 5 Live's comedy sports panel show, Fighting Talk.

=== Film ===
Holland debuted in 1982 in a small role as a schoolboy in the Channel 4 film P'tang, Yang, Kipperbang. In 1998, he played "Bob" in The Young Person's Guide to Becoming a Rock Star. In 1999, he appeared as "Cello Player" in Tube Tales. Holland has written four screenplays, three of which have been sold to producers, but as yet, have not been made into films.

=== Writing ===
Holland has written material for Bob Monkhouse, Lenny Henry, Harry Enfield, Des O'Connor, Clive Anderson and many others. Holland has published two comic novels, Only in America and The Ripple Effect. His third novel, A Man's Life, was published in 2013. For two years, Holland wrote the Funny Money column for The Guardian. In January 2013, Holland published How Tom Holland Eclipsed His Dad. He published The Fruit Bowl on July 13, 2020. Published on November 22, 2020, Takes on Life Vol. 1 contains thirty-one autobiographical essays or "Takes" on the life of Dominic Holland. This was followed, in 2023, by Takes on Life Vol. 2 and Open Links in 2024.

== Bibliography ==
- Open Links, 2024
- Takes on Life Vol. 2, 2023
- Takes on Life Vol. 1, 2020. ISBN 978-1999765651.
- The Fruit Bowl, 2020. ISBN 9781999765620.
- How Tom Holland Eclipsed His Dad, Amazon.co.uk, 2013. ASIN: B00B0XBSG6.
- A Man's Life (novel), Smashwords, 2012. ISBN 9781301463633.
- The Ripple Effect (novel), Flame, 2003. ISBN 0-340-81987-1; ISBN 978-0-340-81987-6.
- Only in America (novel), Flame, 2002. ISBN 0-340-82128-0; ISBN 978-0-340-82128-2.
- Sit-Down Comedy (contributor to anthology, ed. Malcolm Hardee & John Fleming), Ebury Press/Random House, 2003. ISBN 0-09-188924-3; ISBN 978-0-09-188924-1.
- Ha Bloody Ha: Comedians Talking (contributor, ed. William Cook), Fourth Estate, 1994. ISBN 1-85702-180-0; ISBN 978-1-85702-180-6.
