= Writer's Inc =

British comedy troupe

Writer's Inc was a sketch comedy troupe who won the 1982 Edinburgh Comedy Award, then known as the Perrier Award for sponsorship reasons. The troupe consisted of Gary Adams, Steve Brown, Vicki Pile, Trevor McCallum, Helen Murry, Jamie Rix, and Nick Wilton, with additional material by Kim Fuller.

Compared to the previous year's winners, Cambridge Footlights, and many subsequent winners, the post-award public profile of the group's members has been relatively low. It has been reported that they largely vanished into comedy obscurity and by 1997, the award's official archivist was reported to have no record of what had happened to them.

However, many have continued to work within the comedy industry, occasionally in collaboration, but more often separately. Pile went on to be producer of sketch comedy show Smack the Pony. McCallum wrote for series including Not The Nine O'Clock News, The Two Ronnies, Spitting Image and Three of a Kind, set up his own production company and has written plays. Rix became a TV comedy producer, forming a production company with Nigel Planer, as well as a children’s author, animation writer and director. He is married to Murry. Wilton was in Sony Award winning radio comedies Son of Cliche and In One Ear (which was produced by Rix) and has more recently been in EastEnders, while Fuller also wrote for shows like Not The Nine O'Clock News.
