= Amy Gledhill =

British comedian (active 2012–present)

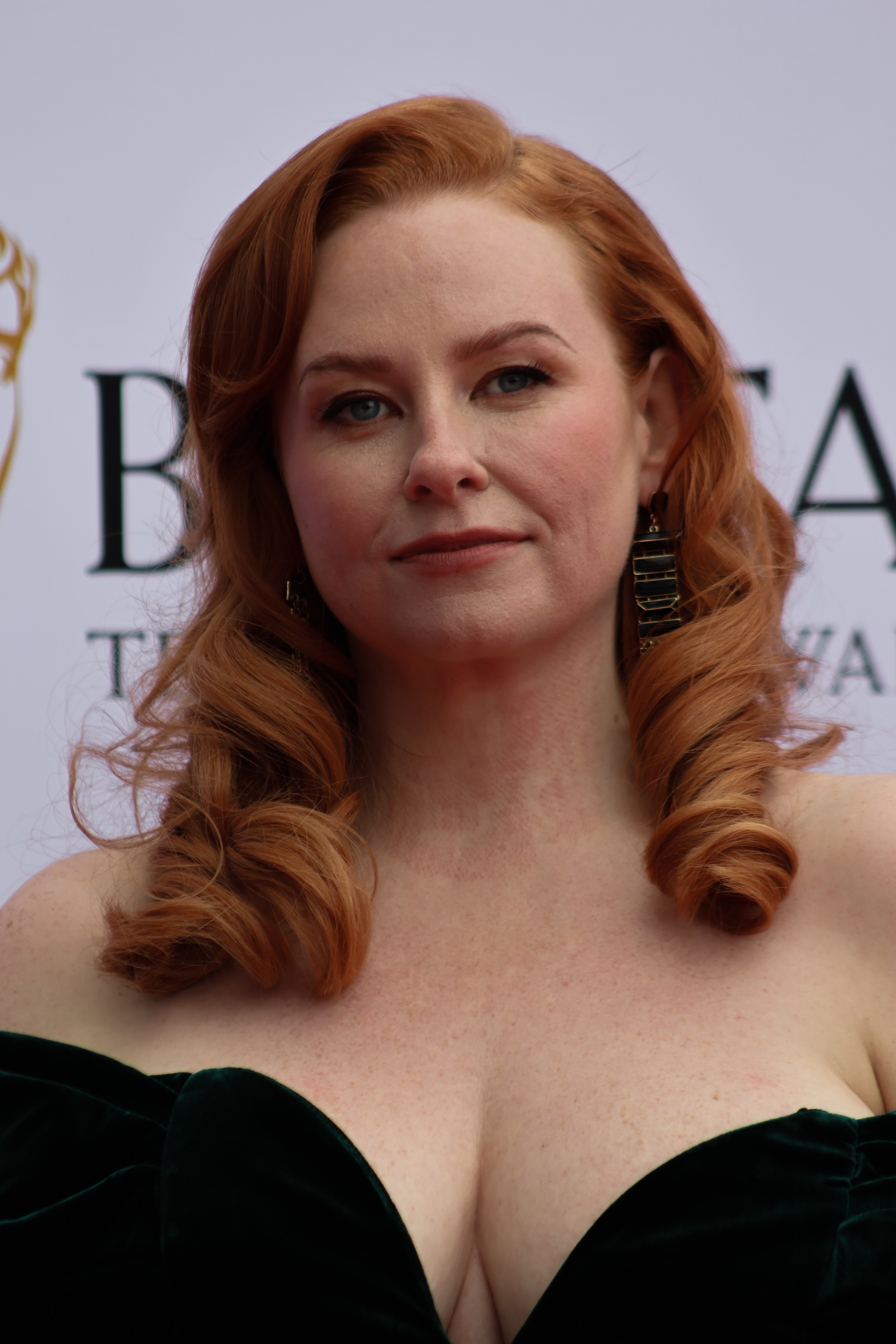
- Gledhill at the 2026 British Academy Television Awards
- Notable work: The Delightful Sausage; The Girl Before The Girl You Marry

Comedy career
- Years active: 2012–present
- Website: amygledhill.co.uk

Amy Gledhill is a British stand-up comedian and actress from Hull, East Yorkshire. She has been nominated for Best Show at the UK National Comedy Awards and for Best Show and Best Newcomer at the Edinburgh Fringe Festival, winning the former in 2024. She performs solo and as half of The Delightful Sausage with Chris Cantrill.

== Early life ==
Gledhill is from Hull, and as part of her stand-up routine has said she is the youngest of seven children.

== Career ==
Gledhill started her career in various sketch groups in the north of England. In 2018, it was announced on the BBC One programme The One Show that she was the second winner of the Caroline Aherne Bursary. She received a cash prize and mentoring from a BBC commissioning editor.

In 2019, as part of the double act The Delightful Sausage, Gledhill was nominated for Best Show at the Edinburgh Fringe Festival's Comedy Awards for their show Ginsters Paradise.

Between 2020 and 2021, Gledhill appeared as various characters in the CBBC and BBC iPlayer children's sketch show Big Fat Like. She also contributed to the show as a writer.

In 2021 and 2024, Gledhill appeared as Leslie in the BBC Two comedy series Alma's Not Normal.

Gledhill made her solo show debut at the 2022 Edinburgh Fringe Festival with The Girl Before The Girl You Marry. She was nominated for Best Newcomer for that show at the Edinburgh Comedy Awards. That year she was also nominated for Best Show as part of The Delightful Sausage – she was the first person to be nominated for involvement in two shows in the same year since Dan Antopolski in 2000.

In 2023, Gledhill embarked on her first solo UK tour after a sold-out run at the Soho Theatre in London. In January, she hosted the BBC Sounds podcast Obsessed with... Happy Valley alongside fellow comedian Isy Suttie, in which they "discuss fan theories and chat to familiar faces from the cast". In February, Gledhill was nominated at the UK National Comedy Awards in the Best Stand-Up category for her show The Girl Before The Girl You Marry. She also appeared in the second series of the Channel 4 comedy Hullraisers.

Since 2023, Gledhill is co-host on the Northern News podcast with Ian Smith.

In February 2024, Gledhill appeared on the BBC panel comedy show Would I Lie to You?. That month, she was nominated in the Best Best Breakthrough Act category, and Northern News was nominated in the Best Podcast category at the Chortle Awards.

In summer 2024, Gledhill returned to the Fringe with her new show, Make Me Look Fit on the Poster. It was nominated for Best Show at the ISH Edinburgh Comedy Awards, and won the Edinburgh Comedy Award for Best Show.

In October 2024, Gledhill and fellow comedian Harriet Kemsley launched a podcast called Single Ladies In Your Area, where they discuss, with guests, modern dating after the break-up of their respective long-term relationships.

In January 2026, Gledhill appeared in the Netflix series Run Away as DC Ruby Todd. In March 2026, she was a contestant on the second series of LOL: Last One Laughing UK. In May 2026, she was a contestant on the 21st series of Taskmaster and appeared in 2026 supernatural comedy film Ghosts: The Possession of Button House, as well as 2026 comedy television series Make That Movie and the fifteenth series of Not Going Out.

== Personal life ==
Gledhill lived in Leeds and Manchester before moving to London.
