= The Delightful Sausage =

Comedy double act

Comedy career
- Years active: 2016–present
- Members: Christopher Cantrill; Amy Gledhill
- Website: https://www.thedelightfulsausage.com

The Delightful Sausage are a comedy double act, created by Amy Gledhill and Christopher Cantrill. In 2019 and 2022 they were nominated for 'Best Show' at the Edinburgh Fringe.

== Career ==
The Delightful Sausage was created by comedians Christopher Cantrill and Amy Gledhill. Their first comedy show was called Cold Hard Cache, which made its debut at the Edinburgh Fringe Festival in 2017. The Skinny gave the show a 4 star review and declared "Everyone here has met their new favourite double act". ThreeWeeks noted that "it’s a belter. Keep an eye on them”. The Delightful Sausage were featured on Broadcasting House on BBC Radio 4 and also made an appearance in Timeout’s list of 'the ten best gigs this month'. Following the festival, Cold Hard Cache transferred to the Soho Theatre, Greater Manchester's The Lowry and it was also recorded for comedy streaming platform NextUp.

In 2018, Cantrill and Gledhill were finalists in the Sketch Off competition at the Leicester Square Theatre. The Delightful Sausage returned to the Edinburgh Festival in 2018 with their follow-up show, Regeneration Game. The show was featured in The Guardian's list of 'The best shows at the Edinburgh festival 2018'. In Fest Magazine's 4 star review, it was described as "a relentlessly silly show, crafted with considerable care and delivered with aplomb". Chortle.co.uk said "The pair both have funny bones, no doubt about that". Regeneration Game subsequently transferred to The Soho Theatre and The Lowry in Greater Manchester.

Cantrill and Gledhill were selected to be part of the 2018 BBC's Comedy Room scheme which was set up to help develop fledgling comedy writers. In January 2019, Gledhill was awarded the Caroline Aherne Bursary to develop working class comedy voices. In 2019 they took their third show to the Edinburgh Fringe Festival. Ginster's Paradise was nominated for the 'Best Show' award. The Times awarded the show 4 stars and said, “Gledhill and Cantrill have a devotion to finding fun that is without vanity”. The Guardian awarded the duo 4 stars and praised The Delightful Sausage as "a cult hit" and said that the show's "tone veers between wholesomely innocent and darkly shocking". Ginster's Paradise subsequently transferred to the Soho Theatre in December 2019.

The Delightful Sausage made their television debut on 8 November 2019, performing on Harry Hill's Clubnite (Channel 4). They appeared alongside Mawaan Rizwan, Mat Ewins, Phil Dunning and Suzi Ruffell. In 2020, with their live tour put on hold due to the Coronavirus pandemic The Delightful Sausage launched their first podcast, Tiredness Kills. Cantrill and Gledhill also won a Chortle Award for the best 'Character, improv and sketch'. The Delightful Sausage were featured as one of The Guardian's 'top comedy acts to look out for in 2021' and on 6 March, Cantrill and Gledhill made their debut on BBC Radio 2 in 'The Delightful Sausage on: Staycations'. The half hour special kicked off the BBC's 'Festival of Funny' alongside shows by Tommy Tiernan and Anuvab Pal. Cantrill and Gledhill were seen on several TV appearances in the latter half of 2021. They both appeared (albeit in separate episodes) in Sophie Willan’s BAFTA-winning sitcom Alma’s Not Normal (BBC 2). They also made two guest appearances as The Delightful Sausage in Nish Kumar’s Late Night Mash (Dave) and were Richard Ayoade's special guests in the inaugural series of Question Team (Dave).
