= Peter Buckley Hill =

British comedian

Peter Buckley Hill (born Edward Peter Hill on 3 March 1948) is a musical comedian and head of the Free Fringe at the Edinburgh Festival Fringe, for which he was, in 2009, awarded the Panellists' Edinburgh Comedy Award. In 2008, he was nominated for the Malcolm Hardee Award for Comic Originality.

He was born in Burnley, Lancashire and educated at Poynton Primary School, Stockport Grammar School and Leeds Grammar School. Graduating from University College London in 1969 with a degree in English, he embarked on a career with BASF AG in Switzerland and Germany. He returned to the UK in 1973 to complete an MSc at London Business School.

From 1975, he was involved in various small business ventures and in 1980 became a temporary lecturer at the Polytechnic of Central London, now University of Westminster. He served spells with PCL, South Bank Polytechnic and other educational institutions before becoming Senior Lecturer and Co-ordinator of Computing at ILEA Paddington College. He returned to PCL in 1985, became Principal Lecturer in 1989 and Teaching Fellow in 2005. He gained the degree of Doctor of Education from the University of Bristol in 2004.

He embarked on a parallel career in musical comedy in 1980, using as a basis material he had written for LBS revues and for the amusement of friends. He found a niche at the Cambridge Folk Festival, sometimes at marathon solo sessions lasting up to three hours.

Hill guested regularly at folk circuit venues and also played alternative cabaret venues such as the Earth Exchange in the early 1980s. He was present at the outset of the Alternative Comedy movement of the 1980s, but not central to it.

In 1994, he took a solo show to the Edinburgh Fringe for the first time. It was savaged by critics. He repeated the experience in 1995, before realising that the basic model of the Fringe needed altering in favour of the unknown or non-established artist. In 1996, he founded the Free Fringe with a single show, Peter Buckley Hill and Some Comedians, at the Footlights and Firkin.

The Free Fringe works on a moneyless principle: premises charge no rent to the Free Fringe; the Free Fringe charges no fees to the performers (not even voluntary charges) and the performers do not charge the public to get in. For fourteen years, the Free Fringe was financed personally by Buckley Hill; in 2009, a benefit was held to defray the central expenses. Also in that year, Buckley Hill's solo Edinburgh show, 40 Words, earned a five-star review from The Scotsman. Hill stepped down from managing the Free Fringe in 2016.

Buckley Hill published a book on his experience of the Edinburgh Fringe called Freeing The Edinburgh Fringe in 2018. At the 2019 Edinburgh Fringe, he performed reading of the book as part of the PBH Free Fringe.
