= Li Jin Hao =

Singaporean stand-up comedian

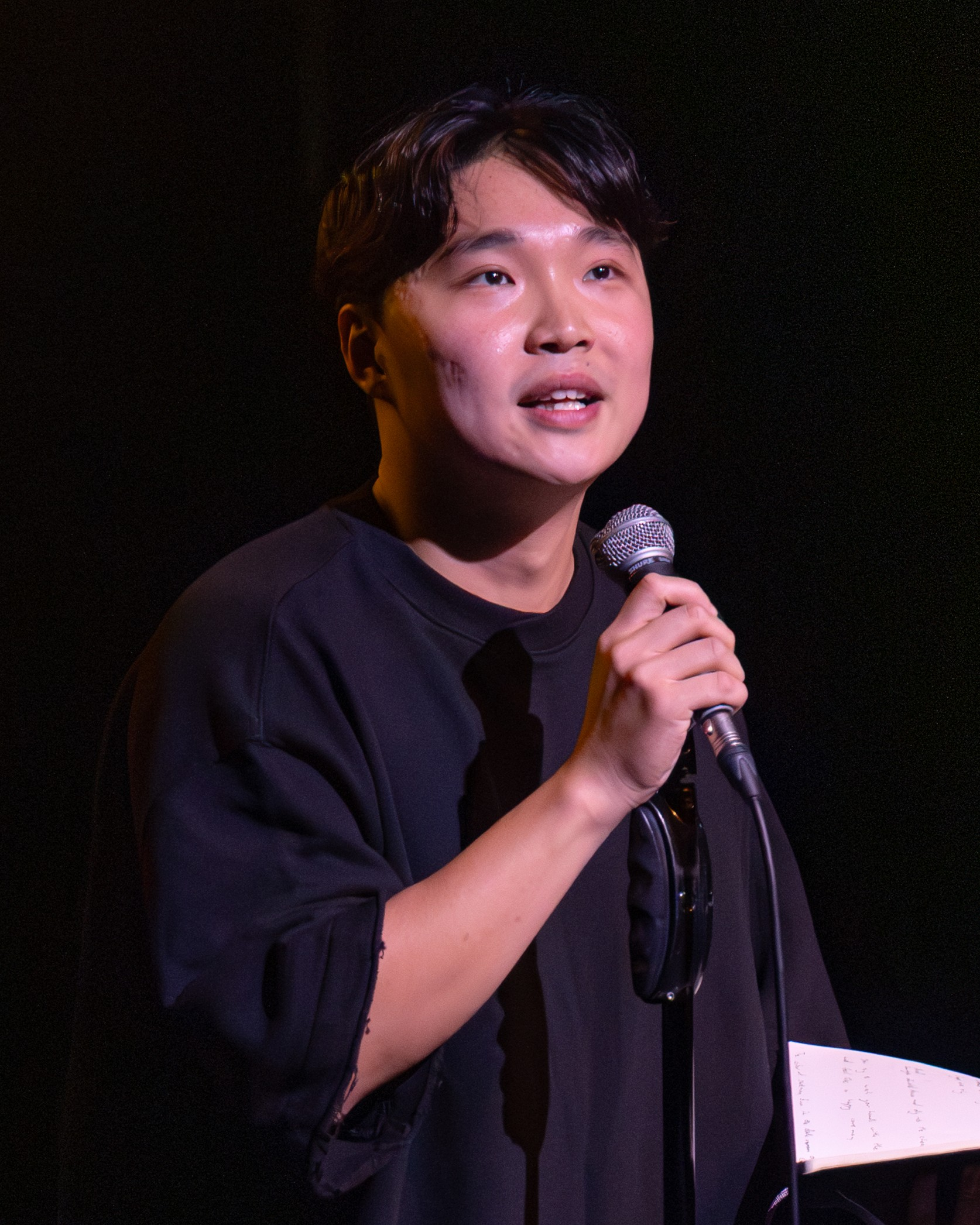
- Li Jin Hao at the Edinburgh Fringe Festival in 2026.
- Born: China
- Education: University of St Andrews
- Occupation: Comedian

Li Jin Hao (李金昊) is a Singaporean stand-up comedian. He was nominated for Best Show by the Edinburgh Comedy Awards in 2026, and the Best Newcomer award at the 2024 Edinburgh Festival Fringe.

== Early life ==
Li was born in China and raised in Singapore, and completed mandatory national service. He was educated in Film Studies at St Andrews University in Scotland, where he was also a member of the comedy revue.

== Career ==
Li reached the final of the Chortle Student Comedy Award in 2022. He was a finalist in the BBC New Comedy Awards in 2023.

He performed his one-man show Swimming in a Submarine at the 2024 Edinburgh Festival Fringe in his one-man Edinburgh debut. The surrealism in the show was noted by The Guardian which described it as combining "dreams with reality", whilst noting that "the whole thing feels like a dizzying trip to the deep underwater unknown", and "nothing short of a revelation" by Rolling Stone. He was nominated for the Best Newcomer award at the Festival. The show was also nominated for Best Newcomer at the Comedians’ Choice Awards at the Festival.

In October 2024, Li was a finalist for the Sean Lock Comedy Award on Channel 4.

In 2026, Li performed his new show Falling From a Moon at the Edinburgh Festival Fringe and was nominated for Best Show by the Edinburgh Comedy Awards.

=== Style of comedy ===
His style has been described as using surrealism combined with a "quietly commanding" delivery, Fellow comedian Raul Kohli described his style as "If Noel Fielding met Stewart Lee and was East Asian".
