= Bruce Morton (comedian) =

Scottish comedian

Bruce Morton is a Scottish comedian, writer, playwright and actor who won the first series of So You Think You're Funny? in 1988.

== Career ==
He was nominated for the Edinburgh Comedy Award in 1992, which led to him getting a Channel 4 series of the same name the following year.

As an actor, he has appeared in Rab C. Nesbitt, Scot Squad, and Still Game, playing the role of an undertaker in the latter. He also played the role of a doctor in the early series, in the storyline of Winston and his amputated leg.

He first play in 1998 was Blood Below the Window, which he also performed at the Traverse Theatre, Edinburgh; and in 2001 he co-wrote the musical comedy Wake Me Up In The Year 2001 for the Pavilion Theatre, Glasgow. In 2016, he wrote a new play, Silver Threads.

In 2005-6, he conducted a series of interviews with other comedians for BBC Radio, broadcast under the title Comic to Comic.
