= Marty Gleeson =

Irish comedian based in the UK

- Marty Gleeson performing at the Edinburgh Fringe Festival 2024
- Born: 1992; Limerick, Ireland
- Notable work: Dog Ear

Comedy career
- Years active: 2022–present

Marty Gleeson is an Irish stand-up comedian based in London, United Kingdom.

== Early life and education ==
Gleeson is from Adare, a village in County Limerick, Ireland. She graduated from Crescent College Comprehensive and went on to study fine arts at the Limerick School of Art and Design. Gleeson moved to London after winning a free laptop in a competition, which she sold to fund the move.

== Career ==
At the Edinburgh Festival Fringe in 2024, Gleeson performed as part of The Pleasance Comedy Reserve, a compilation show of up-and-coming comedians.

Gleeson was a finalist for the Sean Lock Comedy Award on Channel 4, as well as the BBC New Comedy Award in 2024. In the same year, Gleeson was awarded LGBTQ+ New Comedian of the Year.

In 2026, Gleeson performed Dog Ear, her first solo show at Edinburgh Fringe, which was inspired by her experience in art school. The show, which was directed by Abby Wambaugh, featured Gleeson playing the bodhrán. Gleeson won Best Newcomer at the Comedians' Choice Awards and the Edinburgh Comedy Awards for Dog Ear. A critic described it as "one of the most original debuts I’ve ever seen."

Gleeson has performed tour support for Vittorio Angelone.

== Personal life ==
Gleeson has an older sister, who is an accountant. She often performs comedy about her distinctively deep voice.
