= Yianni Agisilaou =

Australian-born comedian (born 1978)

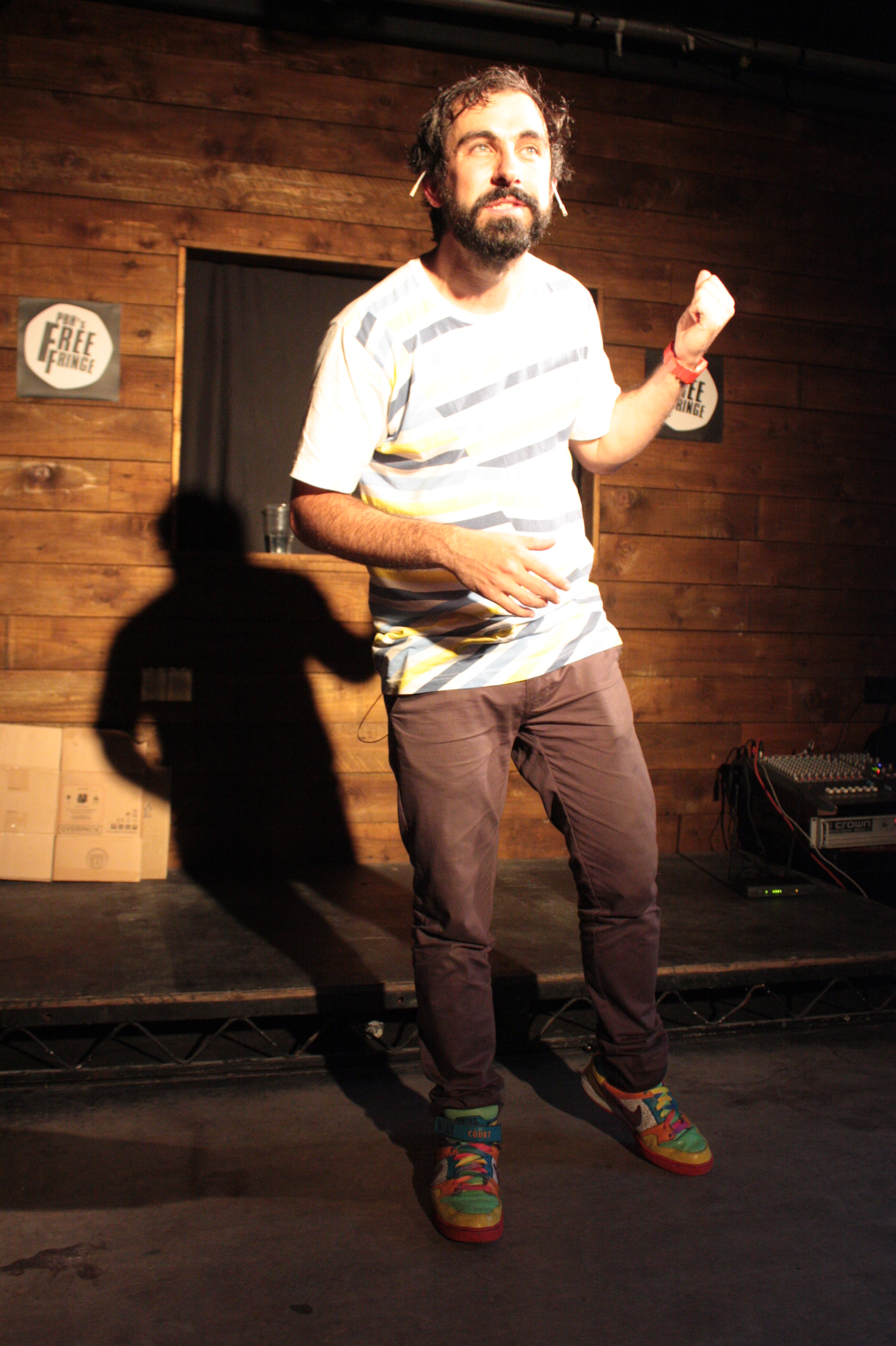
- Agisilaou at the Free Fringe in Edinburgh, 2013
- Born: 5 April 1978 (age 48); Melbourne, Victoria, Australia
- Education: Scotch College, Melbourne; University of Melbourne
- Occupation: Comedian
- Years active: 2000–present
- Website: www.ycomedian.com

Yianni Agisilaou (born 5 April 1978) is an Australian-born comedian based in the United Kingdom. His comedy normally takes the form of an illustrated lecture on a single central theme. He is a frequent performer at both the Edinburgh Fringe and the Melbourne Comedy Festival. He has appeared on television shows such as Take The Mike (ITV) and Raw Comedy (ABC).

== Life ==
He was born on 5 April 1978 in Melbourne, Australia into a family of Greek-Cypriot descent. His secondary education was at Scotch College, Melbourne. He then studied Law and Finance at the University of Melbourne graduating LLB BCom (Hons) and began working in the legal firm of Baker & McKenzie. However, he abandoned his legal career in favour of a life on the comedy circuits.

He began stand-up in 2000 in Australia whilst still at university and found fairly success as Best New Act of 2001. He then appeared in the TV show Raw Comedy, reaching the final in Melbourne Town Hall in front of a live audience of 1,500. In 2002 he performed acts in both the United States and Great Britain during a 6-month break from the legal world. He moved to London in August 2004.

One of his largest shows was the 1200 capacity Edinburgh International Conference Centre during the 2013 Edinburgh Fringe Think Big tour. He was also one of the performers at a 4000 crowd in Johannesburg in South Africa. He regularly comperes and/or performs at music festivals and comedy festivals. He has entertained British troops in Afghanistan, Cyprus and the Falkland Islands.

His 2017 show "Pockets of Equality" is part of the Australian Broadcasting Company's "Comedy Next Gen" series beginning in November 2017.

== Performances ==
- Raw Prawns (2002) new Australian talent at the Edinburgh Fringe
- The World Stands Up (2005) (contributor)
- Yianni's Head Free Fringe, Edinburgh Festival (2006)
- Maybe You'd Like To Teach The Class Free Fringe, Edinburgh Festival (2007)
- MP3some Free Fringe, Edinburgh Festival (2009)
- The Universe: A User's Guide Free Fringe, Edinburgh Festival (2010)
- They @#@~ You Up, Greek Parents Free Fringe, Edinburgh Festival (2010)
- Things That Make You Go Ooooh Free Fringe, Edinburgh Festival (2011)
- Numb and Number Free Fringe, Edinburgh Festival (2012)
- Think Big Free Fringe, Edinburgh Festiva] (2013)
- Why Did The Chicken Cross The Line? Free Fringe, Edinburgh Festival (2015)
- Comedians Against Humanity Free Fringe, Edinburgh Festival (2015–2017)
- The Simpsons Taught Me Everything I Know, Free Fringe, Edinburgh Festival (2016)
- The Un-Pinchable Pink Pen, Perth Fringe, Australia (2017)
- Pockets of Equality, Free Fringe, Edinburgh Festival (2017)
- I, Human, Edinburgh Fringe 2018
