= Chris Cantrill =

British comedian

- Born: Bradford, England
- Notable work: The Delightful Sausage
- Website: http://christopher-cantrill.com/

Chris Cantrill is a British stand-up comedian, writer, and actor. He won Best Show at the Edinburgh Comedy Awards for his one-man show in 2026, after previously being nominated in 2024 and as half of The Delightful Sausage with Amy Gledhill in 2019 and 2022.

== Career ==
Cantrill began performing comedy at the age of 28 years-old, having previously had an office job working as a marketing manager.

Cantrill made his television debut on Harry Hill’s ClubNite for Channel 4. His television credits include Alma's Not Normal on BBC 2 and Don't Hug Me I’m Scared on Channel 4, and he provided voices for BAFTA-winning videogame Thank Goodness You're Here. He was the co-creator and star of BBC Radio 4’s comedy, Icklewick FM, which won a BBC Audio Drama Awards for Best Comedy Performance. In 2026, he was a writer on SNL UK.

Cantrill performs solo and as half of The Delightful Sausage with Amy Gledhill. In 2018 with their follow-up show Regeneration Game, the show was featured in The Guardian's list of 'The best shows at the Edinburgh festival 2018' with the review of the show having "very smart writing amid the chaos. It’s not tidy, it’s not subtle – but it’s fun". They were nominated for Best Show at the Edinburgh Fringe Festival's Comedy Awards for their show Ginsters Paradise in 2019. In 2022, they were nominated again with their show Nowt but Sea.

He first performed a solo show at the Edinburgh Festival in 2015. Cantrill was nominated for Best Show by the Edinburgh Comedy Awards in August 2024 for his one-man show Easily Swayed. In 2026, he won Best Show for his show Rewilding. The winning show, a spoof whodunit and satire on the global outrage caused by the felling of the Sycamore Gap tree and set within the fictionalised village of Gaskill, also continued a fish-out-of-water theme explored in his 2024 show, relating to his move from city-life to the countryside. He was the oldest winner of the award, at the age of 42, since Bridget Christie in 2013.

== Personal life ==
Born in Bradford, he later lived in Manchester and on the border of Cumbria and Northumberland. He became a father for the first time in 2016.
