= Bob Slayer =

Comedian and promoter

Bob Slayer is an Edinburgh Comedy Award winning comedian, musician and promoter. He has been part of a new economic model for venues at the Edinburgh Festival Fringe which has made the event fairer and more affordable for performers and audiences. Acts that have performed at his venues have won and been nominated for a number of prestigious awards.

== Stand-up career ==
Slayer is a former music manager, who was tour and production manager for bands such as Snoop Dogg, The Magic Numbers, Bloodhound Gang and Electric Eel Shock who he worked with since 2003. Prior to that he had been a jockey. He has performed stand-up at the Edinburgh Festival Fringe since 2008. As well as Brighton Fringe, Glasgow International Comedy Festival, Leicester Comedy Festival, Galway Comedy Carnival, Humorfest Bergen, Crap åppå Park Oslo, World Fringe Festival Perth, Adelaide Fringe. He has also toured with Steve-O, Phil Kay, Simon Donald, Jason Rouse.

== Edinburgh Fringe ==
Slayer has performed at the Edinburgh Fringe every year since 2008. Solo Shows

- 2010 - Bob Slayer: Punk Rock Chatshow (aka How to Bully A Welshman)
- 2011 - Bob Slayer: Marmite Gameshow
- 2012 - Bob Slayer: Is A Very Naughty Boy
- 2013 - Bob Slayer: Worldwide Bawbag
- 2014 - Bob Slayer: Fool Members Club (late night)
- 2015 - Bob Slayer: Fat Jockey
- 2016 - Bob Slayer: NeverMind The BusStops (late night)
- 2017 - Bob Slayer: Whatever Next
- 2018 - Bob Slayer Is Bob Slayer
- 2019 - Bob Slayer: Wrote the Copy for This Show in March When He Didn't Have the Foggiest Notion of What Might Happen on Any Given Day in August, He Still Doesn't Really, but At Least He's Found This Snappy Title

Other Fringe shows include: ComedyOpoly (Comedians and Boardgames), How 2 Drive A Bus (Kids Show)

== Iraq Out & Loud ==
In 2016 Slayer produced Iraq Out & Loud at the Edinburgh Fringe. 1500 comedians and members of the public read the entirety of the 2.6 million word Chilcot Report for 24 hours a day, over 13 days. The project was one of the most talked about events at the Fringe that year and won the Edinburgh Comedy Awards Panel Prize for Spirit of the Fringe as well as the TV Bomb Zeitgeist Award.

== BlundaBus ==
Slayer is driver and promoter of a mobile theatre and piano bar on his own converted ex-London double decker bus. The BlundaBus first appeared at the Edinburgh Fringe in 2015, parked outside Potterrow Underpass and has been back each year since. It has also appeared at festivals around the UK such as Glastonbury, Kelburn, Nozstock, Musicport, Freerange, Leicester Comedy Festival, Glasgow Comedy Festival. As well as further afield in Denmark, Norway at Humorfest, Bergen and Galway International Comedy Carnival.

== Heroes of Fringe ==
Under the name Heroes of Fringe, Slayer and associates promote and operate a number of venues at the Edinburgh Festival Fringe, the world's largest arts festival and the Leicester Comedy Festival, and tours around the UK and Europe.

=== History ===
In 2011 Bob Slayer programmed some acts in to the Hive as part of the Laughing Horse Free Festival: Phil Kay, Kunt and the Gang, John Robertson, Lucy Hopkins, Frank Sanazi and Slayer himself. Kunt and The Gang promoted his show with some stickers in the shape of a crudely drawn cock which he suggested punters might want to 'decorate' posters for other shows around the Festival. Established large venue Underbelly and one of the major comedy agents Avalon threatened to sue and 'Cockgate' became one of the most talked about 'events' of the festival. Much discussion followed about how the stunt highlighted the over commercialisation of the Fringe.

The following year 2012 Slayer took over the Hive and launched The Alternative Fringe, which was set up as set up as a statement against venues which charge performers extortionate fees and leave the majority of artists in debt.

In 2013 this was renamed Heroes of Fringe after a series of tours Slayer had promoted around the UK. New venue Heroes @ Bob's Bookshop was added. This was renamed Bob & Miss Behave's Bookshop in 2014 to acknowledge performer Miss Behave's co-production of the venue. In 2015, the Bookshop was replaced with a pop-up bar and venue on a double decker bus, called Bob's BlundaBus. 2016 the dragonfly was added. In 2017 Heroes also programmed the line-up at the Monkey Barrel, a year-round comedy club in Edinburgh. 2018 Boteco, Black Medicine and The SpiegelYurt were all added to the Heroes family.

In 2014, Heroes also promoted at the Leicester Comedy Festival for the first time. The venue, Heroes @ Hansom Hall, was nominated for the best venue award at the festival. Slayer was nominated for best promoter and won the Liberty Award for Spirit of the Festival. Heroes now also promote at the Criterion with Bob's BlundaBus sometimes parked outside.

=== Business model ===
Slayer has been a vocal opponent of the increasing commercialism of Fringe venues. in The Guardian Typically, venues charge acts for the hire of a performance space at the Fringe, including a fee for rent, equipment hire, and a compulsory marketing charge. The sums involved mean that performers are often charged more than they can make back in ticket sales.

Heroes do not charge performers for the space. Audiences can either buy tickets in advance to guarantee a seat, or turn up on spec and pay what they want afterwards. Fringe commentators have commented on how the Fringe is changing because of smaller independent promoters such as Heroes.

=== Awards ===
In 2013 Adrienne Truscott won the Edinburgh Comedy Awards panel prize for spirit of the Fringe thus making Heroes the smallest venue at the Fringe to win one of the highest awards. Comedy critic Bruce Dessau called the award "a victory of the 'Independent' Fringe – for the first time the 'Big Four' venues, went home from the Foster's Awards empty-handed... showing that this year that non 'pay-to-play' has finally arrived as a force to be reckoned with, not just when to comes to good value for audiences, but also when it comes to high quality comedy.”

In 2016 Heroes again won the Edinburgh Comedy Award Panel Prize for innovative performance art piece, Iraq Out & Loud, in which the Chilcot Report was read live in full by a rotating cast of performers and members of the public. Heroes retained the panel prize in 2017.

Edinburgh Fringe

- Four Heroes shows were nominated for Edinburgh Comedy Awards in 2017 and Heroes retained the Panel Prize.
- Edinburgh Comedy Award Panel Prize (2016) - Iraq Out & Loud
- TV Bomb Zeitgeist Award (2016) - Iraq Out & Loud
- Barry Award for 'Best' Person at the Fringe (2016) - Bob Slayer (& Nomination Sorcha Shanahan)
- Malcolm Hardee Award For Comic Originality (2015) - Michael Brunstrom
- Barry Award for Best Show at the Fringe (2015) - Spencer Jones
- Malcolm Hardee Award For Comic Originality (2014) - Candy GiGi
- Barry Award for 'Best' Person at the Fringe (2014) - Bob Slayer
- Fosters Edinburgh Comedy Award Panel Prize (2013) - Adrienne Truscott
- Malcolm Hardee Award For Comic Originality (2013) - Adrienne Truscott
- Malcolm Hardee Pound of Flesh Award (2013) - Ellis & Rose
- Total Theatre Award Nomination (2013) - Adrienne Truscott
- Malcolm Hardee Cunning Stunt Award (2011) - Kunt & The Gang and Bob Slayer

Other Awards

- Chortle Award for Event of the Year (2017): Bob Slayer was co-producer (with Adam LArter and Alex Hardy) and performer (as the Robotic Cheese Grater) in Tony Law on Ice at Alexandra Palace Ice Rink.
- Leicester Comedy Festival: Liberty Award (2014), Best Promoter (2014), Best Small Venue (2015), Best New Venue (2015)
- Most Talented Young Novice Jockey. West Midlands Point to Point Area (1993)
