= Laughing Horse =

British comedy company

Laughing Horse is a British comedy promotion company and venue operator.

The company was established in the UK in 1998, and now operates venues in Aldershot, Brighton, Cirencester, Hitchin, London (Brixton, Covent Garden, Lancaster Gate, Paddington), Manchester, St Neots, Thetford and Wyboston. They run three venues at Brighton Fringe, seventeen at Edinburgh Fringe and also have a presence at the Perth, Adelaide and Melbourne Fringes. It is run by Alex Petty and Kevin McCarron.

At Edinburgh, they have run the Free Edinburgh Fringe Festival since 2004. At these shows, audiences do not have to buy tickets. They simply pay what they choose as a donation at the end of the show.

From 2001-2018, they ran the Laughing Horse New Act of the Year competition, which was won by several famous British comedians at early stages of their career. For that reason, it has been called "a big deal to British newcomers". Greg Davies won the competition on his fourth ever gig, and Russell Kane won it within the first six months of his career. Others to have won or made the final include Rhod Gilbert, Nina Conti, Jack Whitehall and Carl Donnelly. The company also run comedy training courses.

== New Act of the Year Winners & finalists ==
- 2001 - Matt Blaize
- 2002 - Greg Davies
- 2003 - Marek Larwood
- 2004 - Russell Kane
- 2005 - James Branch
- 2006 - Carl Donnelly
- 2007 - Daniel Rigby
- 2008 - Darren Ruddell as "Kev"
- 2009 - Sam Gore
- 2010 - Julian Deane
- 2011 - Adam Belbin
- 2012 - Bobby Mair
- 2013 - Sofie Hagen
- 2014 - Jenny Collier
- 2015 - Donal Vaughan
- 2016 - on hiatus
- 2017 - on hiatus
- 2018 - Janine Harouni

== The Edinburgh Fringe ==
Laughing Horse run numerous venues at The Edinburgh Fringe under the name The Free Edinburgh Fringe Festival with past acts including Joel Dommett, Paul McAffrey, Ahir Shah, and Sean Mcloughlin. In 2011, Imran Yusuf was the first show on a free venue to be nominated for the Edinburgh Comedy Awards Best Newcomer prize.

Ahir Shah's Edinburgh shows on The Free Festival in 2017 and 2018 were both nominated for the Edinburgh Comedy Award.

In 2022, Best in Class - a Free Fringe show since 2018 - won the Edinburgh Comedy Awards Panel Prize.
