= Just the Tonic =

English comedy club chain

- Location: Nottingham; Leicester; Edinburgh Festival Fringe
- Owner: Darrell Martin
- Opened: Nottingham – 1994; Leicester – 2012; Edinburgh – 1996

Website
- www.justthetonic.com

Just the Tonic is a comedy club with branches in Nottingham and Leicester, which also takes acts to the Edinburgh Festival Fringe. The club opened in Nottingham in 1994, followed by a Leicester branch in 2012.

Just the Tonic Nottingham moved to its current venue at The Forum, in the Cornerhouse complex, on 26 September 2010. Johnny Vegas, who has claimed that Just the Tonic is "the best comedy club in the country" and is a long-term collaborator with the club, compered the opening night.

The Leicester branch was a venue for the Dave's Comedy Festival for the first time in 2013, winning the award for best venue with a capacity over 200.

== Comedy shows ==
Just the Tonic's Nottingham venue holds a night every Saturday, with three comedians from the circuit performing and hosted by a compere. Just the Tonic Leicester hosts similar nights on Fridays and Saturdays, alongside the 'Big Value Comedy Showcase' on Thursday nights.

Ricky Gervais performed his first gig at Just the Tonic in 1999. Whilst in the club's previous venue, The Old Vic, Just the Tonic's three regular comperes were Johnny Vegas, Daniel Kitson and Ross Noble.

In 2006 Ricky Gervais, Russell Brand, and Jimmy Carr performed at London's Dominion Theatre in an attempt to raise money for a new venue, at a gig called Save Just the Tonic, raising £80,000.

In a 2010 interview with LeftLion magazine, Stewart Lee said: "It’s always great to do Nottingham. I think Darrell does a really good thing there by running a comedy club that is an alternative. All the major cities in England now have a Jongleurs, but they all need something else too, so that new talent is developed. I think with the Just The Tonic venues in London and Edinburgh as well, Darrell is a really valuable part of the UK comedy scene."

Other comedians to have performed at Just the Tonic include: Michael McIntyre, Peter Kay, Bill Bailey, Tim Vine, Jo Brand, Russell Howard, Kevin Bridges, Dylan Moran, Frankie Boyle, John Bishop, Reginald D Hunter, Mark Watson, Richard Herring, Ed Byrne, Ardal O'Hanlon, Russell Kane, Shappi Khorsandi, Stewart Lee, Jack Whitehall, Jack Dee, Sean Lock, Stephen K Amos, Jo Caulfield, Jason Byrne, Andrew Maxwell, Simon Amstell, Alan Davies, Paul Foot, Rob Rouse, Tony Law, Gary Delaney, Andrew Maxwell, Henning Wehn, Hal Cruttenden, Sean Hughes, Steve Hughes, Phill Jupitus, Josie Long, Andi Osho and Andrew Lawrence.

== Edinburgh Festival Fringe ==
Just the Tonic has taken acts to the Edinburgh Festival Fringe since 1996. It has four venues in Edinburgh: Just the Tonic @ The Caves has several performing spaces in the vaults under the South Bridge, at the Tron pub., at the Mash House, and at the Community Project. Just the Tonic's Tron venue made the headlines in 2012 when Hugh Grant was refused entry by externally employed bouncers due to girls in his party not having proof of age.

== Big Value Comedy Showcase ==
Just the Tonic's 'Big Value Comedy Showcase', which auditions new comedy acts to take to the Edinburgh Fringe, has featured household names such as Jason Manford, Lee Mack, Milton Jones, Micky Flanagan, Sarah Millican, Jon Richardson and Jim Jefferies.

== Darrell Martin ==
Darrell Martin is the owner and manager of Just the Tonic. He founded the club in 1994 as he was 'utterly unemployable' and he 'found there was a gap' in the market for a comedy club in Nottingham. A comedian in his own right, Martin reached the finals of the 1997 Daily Telegraph Awards, and has supported Johnny Vegas in his 1999 tour 'Walking Back To Happiness' and Ed Byrne in 2000.
