= Adrienne Truscott =

American stand-up comedian

- Occupation(s): Choreographer, dancer, stand-up comedian
- Website: www.adriennetruscott.com

Adrienne Truscott is a choreographer, dancer, and stand-up comedian. She won the Edinburgh Comedy Awards Panel Prize and Malcolm Hardee Award for Comic Originality at the 2013 Edinburgh Festival Fringe for her show Adrienne Truscott's Asking For It: A One Lady Rape About Comedy. Originally part of a burlesque duo, The Wau Wau Sisters, Asking For It was her first solo comedy show. She also received a Foundation for Contemporary Arts Grants to Artists award (2017).

Truscott's show …Too Freedom… premiered at The Kitchen in December 2012.

In 2017, she was appointed as one of three Fringe Ambassadors for the Adelaide Fringe.

Truscott is a 1994 graduate of Wesleyan University.
