= Edinburgh Comedy Awards =

Annual awards for comedy shows at the Edinburgh Festival Fringe

- Date: 1981
- Location: Edinburgh Festival Fringe
- Country: Scotland
- Formerly called: Perrier Award, if.comeddies, if.comedy Awards, Dave Awards
- Rewards: £10,000 (Main prize), £5,000 (Other prizes)
- Currently held by: Chris Cantrill, Marty Gleeson, Jonathan Oldfield, Lorna Rose Treen and Liebenspiel (Benjamin Alborough and Ellie BW)

Highlights
- The Audible Best Comedy Show: Chris Cantrill – Rewilding
- The Taffner Family Best Newcomer Award: Marty Gleeson – Dog Ear
- The Audible Panel Prize: One Joke – Jonathan Oldfield, Lorna Rose Treen and Liebenspiel (Benjamin Alborough and Ellie BW)
- Website: www.comedyawards.co.uk

The Edinburgh Comedy Awards (formerly the Perrier Comedy Awards, and also briefly known by other names for sponsorship reasons) are presented to the comedy shows deemed to have been the best at the Edinburgh Festival Fringe in Scotland. Established in 1981, they are the most prestigious comedy prize in the United Kingdom. The awards have been directed and produced by Nica Burns since 1984.

== Format ==
The main prize, which was for many years the only prize, and is now known as The Audible Best Comedy Show, is awarded "for the funniest, most outstanding, up-and-coming comic / comedy show / act" at the Fringe. The winner receives a cash prize of £10,000.

The Taffner Family Best Newcomer Award category was introduced in 1992 for Harry Hill, and is given to the best "performer or act who is performing their first full-length show (50 minutes or more)". The prize is £5,000. Newcomers are eligible for the Best Comedy Show Award, but no act is allowed to appear on both shortlists in the same year.

A further prize, the Audible Panel Prize, was inaugurated in 2006. All shows are eligible, and the award may not be awarded at all, if the panel so choose. This happened in 2017, when for the first time there were joint winners of the main prize. Previously, in 2008, it had been awarded to "every comedian on the Fringe". Like Best Newcomer, the Panel Prize winner receives a cash prize of £5,000.

== History ==
The original award was created by Perrier in 1981 as a way of supporting young talent. Prior to this, there had been no award recognition for comedy shows on the Fringe. The Scotsman had introduced Fringe Firsts in 1973 for theatre. However, revues, then the dominant type of comedy at the Fringe, were excluded. The first Perrier in fact advertised itself as for the "most outstanding revue", thus overlooking stand-up, which was beginning to emerge as a force due to the influence of the alternative comedy scene.

The inaugural award and £1,000 prize was presented to the Cambridge Footlights, a cast that included Stephen Fry, Emma Thompson, Hugh Laurie and Tony Slattery. Their show, entitled The Cellar Tapes played at St Mary Street Hall and was promoted in the programme with the line, "one of the strongest casts for several years, has already toured in southern England with great success." The award was presented by Rowan Atkinson, who had performed with The Oxford Revue in 1976.

The later success of these initial winners would boost the profile of the awards. However, former Oxbridge revue members had always been able to find success in light entertainment, so the effect of the award on their careers may be exaggerated. Nonetheless, the 1981 Award retains symbolic power for new comedians wanting to find fame at the Fringe.

Many other award winners and nominees have gone on to forge successful careers in comedy and the media industry including Lee Evans, Milton Jones, Garth Marenghi's Darkplace creators Richard Ayoade and Matt Holness, double act Alexander Armstrong and Ben Miller, QI panellist Alan Davies, the four members of The League of Gentlemen and Mock the Week panellist Chris Addison. Australian Comedian Brendon Burns has said that he is "arguably the least successful winner" of the award.

A stand-up first won the award in 1987. Sean Hughes was the youngest winner of the award, at the age of 24 in 1990.

A Best Newcomer Award was added in 1992, won by Harry Hill, and in 2006 the inaugural Panel Prize was won by Mark Watson.

The panel prize was awarded to 'all performers' in 2008, and the £4,000 prize money was put behind their bar at the end of August party.

2013 was the first year that all three awards went to shows in independent venues outside the so-called 'big four'. John Kearns (PBH) won Best Newcomer, Bridget Christie (The Stand) won Best Show and Adrienne Truscott (Heroes @ Bob's Bookshop) won the panel prize.

In 2014, John Kearns became the first comedian to win Best Newcomer and Best Comedy Show in consecutive years. In the same year, James Meehan was nominated for the Best Newcomer Award with Gein's Family Giftshop, while winning the panel prize with Funz and Gamez.

In 2017, for the first time, two awards were given for Best Show (John Robins and Hannah Gadsby). No panel prize was awarded in 2017.

In 2018, Rose Matafeo became the first non-white comedian to win Best Comedy Show for a solo show, and the first New Zealander to win the award. Only four other female solo stand-up comedians had won the award before her: Jenny Eclair (1995), Laura Solon (2005), Bridget Christie (2013), and Hannah Gadsby (2017).

In 2022, Amy Gledhill was nominated for best newcomer as a solo act, and best show as part of The Delightful Sausage. She was the first person to be nominated for involvement in two shows in the same year since Dan Antopolski in 2000. In the same year, Sam Campbell was the first winner of the main prize to do a shorter run.

In 2025, Sam Nicoresti became the first transgender winner of the award.

== Sponsorship ==
From their inception in 1981 until 2005 the awards were sponsored by mineral water brand Perrier, during which time they were known as the Perrier Comedy Awards. Sponsorship then passed to the Scottish-based bank Intelligent Finance and for 2006, the first year of their involvement, the awards were known as the if.comeddies, changing to the if.comedy awards for 2007 and 2008.

In March 2009 Intelligent Finance announced it would not be renewing its sponsorship deal. The 2009 awards were known as the Edinburgh Comedy Award, sponsored by AbsoluteRadio.co.uk. From 2010 until 2015 the awards were sponsored by Foster's Lager.

From 2016 the awards have been sponsored by lastminute.com until 2019 when Dave began to sponsor the awards.

For 2023, each award currently has a separate sponsor, being sponsored by Sky TV, DLT Entertainment and The Victoria Wood Foundation, respectively.

2024 saw DLT Entertainment expand its sponsorship to include both the DLT Entertainment Newcomer Award as well as The Don and Eleanor Taffner Best Comedy Show.

In 2026, both the Best Comedy Show award and Panel Prize were sponsored by Audible and the Best Newcomer award was sponsored by the Taffner Family.

In order to avoid confusion due to the frequency of name changes, past winners are now often said to have won "the Eddie", a popular colloquial term for the award, rather than referring to a specific year's sponsor.

== Controversy ==
=== Nestlé ===
In 1995, Perrier was bought by Nestlé, the subject of a long-running boycott based on alleged violations of the International Code of Marketing of Breast-milk Substitutes, leading to calls to boycott or to eliminate the awards taken up by some Fringe venues and performers, including former winners Emma Thompson, Steve Coogan, Stewart Lee and Rob Newman, who led a campaign of protest against the award, beginning in 2001, called Baby Milk Action.

The Nestlé boycott also led to the alternative Tap Water Awards which ran from 2001 to 2006, and aimed to promote access to safe supplies of drinking water and sanitation in developing countries; these awards were suspended for 2007 due to "having beaten Nestlé". Multiple winners were chosen each year, including established comedians like Stewart Lee and Robert Newman, and, in the award's final year, promoter Peter Buckley Hill for his Free Fringe initiative.

=== Inclusivity ===
The 2002 awards were criticised because no female acts were shortlisted, the second consecutive year in which that was the case. In 2009, they were again criticised for all the nominees being male, as well as all being white, English and all performing at the same venue, The Pleasance.

== See also ==
- List of Edinburgh Comedy Award winners
- Funniest Joke of the Fringe
