= Malcolm Hardee =

English comedian (1950–2005)

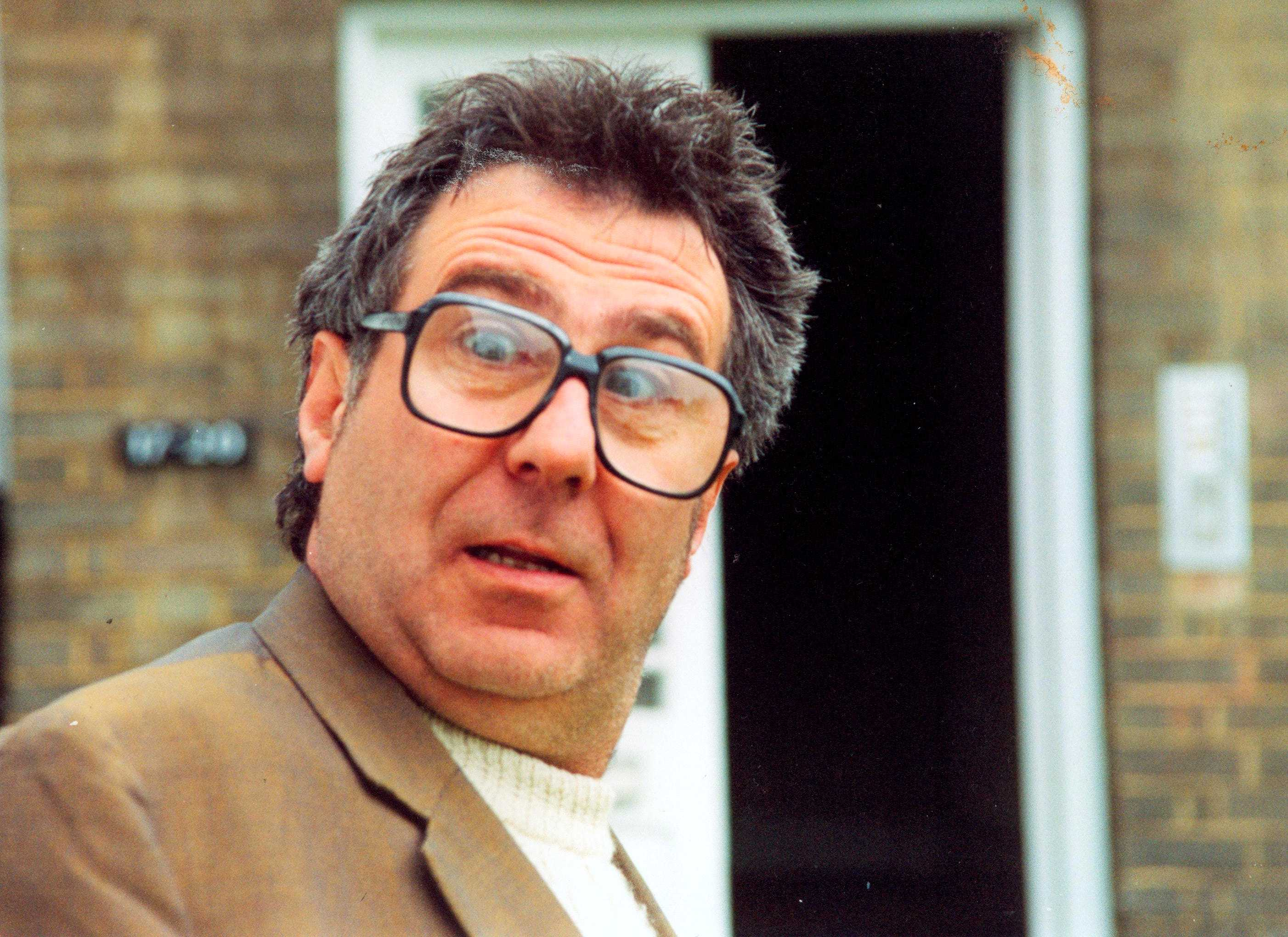
- Hardee in 1995, outside his childhood home in Lewisham
- Born: 5 January 1950; Lewisham, London, England
- Died: 31 January 2005 (aged 55); Rotherhithe, London, England
- Notable work: Autobiography: I Stole Freddie Mercury's Birthday Cake, The Greatest Show on Legs.

Comedy career
- Years active: Mid-1970s–2005
- Medium: Stand-up
- Genres: Physical comedy, Surreal humour
- Subject: Current events
- Website: malcolmhardee.co.uk

Malcolm Hardee (5 January 1950 – 31 January 2005) was an English comedian and comedy club proprietor.

His high reputation among his peers rests on his outrageous publicity stunts and on the help and advice he gave to successful British alternative comedians early in their careers, acting as "godfather to a generation of comic talent in the 1980s". Fellow comic Rob Newman called him "a hilarious, anarchic, living legend; a millennial Falstaff", while Stewart Lee wrote that "Malcolm Hardee is a natural clown who in any decent country would be a national institution" and Arthur Smith described him as "a South London Rabelais" and claimed that "everything about Malcolm, apart from his stand-up act, was original".

Hardee was also a compère and talent-spotting booker at his own clubs, particularly The Tunnel Club in Greenwich, South East London, which gave early exposure to up-and-coming comedians during the early years of British alternative comedy. In his obituary, The Times opined that "throughout his life he maintained a fearlessness and an indifference to consequences" and one journalist claimed: "To say that he has no shame is to drastically exaggerate the amount of shame that he has". In a publicity quote printed in Hardee's autobiography I Stole Freddie Mercury's Birthday Cake, Arthur Smith wrote that Hardee had "led his life as though for the perfect autobiography and now he has paid himself the compliment of writing it."

== Early life ==
Hardee was born in Lewisham, South East London, and came from a long line of lightermen who earned their living on tugs pulling barges on the river. He was the eldest son of Frank and Joan Hardee. He spent his first two years in an orphanage while his mother was in hospital with tuberculosis and was educated at three South East London schools – St Stephen's Church of England primary, Colfe's School, and Sedgehill comprehensive.

Expelled from the latter two schools he drifted into petty crime: stealing Coca-Cola from a local bottling plant, burgling a pawnbrokers and setting fire to a Sunday school piano because he wanted to see "holy smoke". He served prison sentences for cheque fraud, burglary and escaping custody; in 1967, he escaped from Gaynes Hall Borstal dressed as a monk. He also had convictions for arson and once infamously stole a Rolls-Royce which he believed belonged to British cabinet minister Peter Walker. (Walker later wrote to Hardee after reading about this widely reported story and denied it had been his car.)

Hardee decided to turn to showbusiness as a way of staying out of trouble, saying: "There are only two things you can do when you come out of prison and you want immediate employment. You can either be a minicab driver or you can go into showbusiness" and "Prison is like mime or juggling – a tragic waste of time".

== Acts and stunts ==
After his release from prison in 1977 or 1978 (sources vary), Hardee joined Martin Soan's The Greatest Show on Legs – at the time, a one-man adult Punch and Judy act. Revamped as a surreal sketch group, The Greatest Show on Legs became a regular at the Tramshed venue in Woolwich, alongside the likes of Rik Mayall and Ade Edmondson. Soon afterwards, in 1979, The Comedy Store opened in Soho and The Greatest Show on Legs became regulars there as well. Their breakthrough came in 1982, when they performed their Naked Balloon Dance on Chris Tarrant's anarchic late-night TV show O.T.T.

In 1987, as one of his many publicity stunts, Hardee stood for Parliament in the famous 1987 Greenwich by-election, as the "Rainbow Dream Ticket, Beer, Fags & Skittles Party" candidate, polling 174 votes. He stood again in the 1992 election in order to publicise his comedy club because the election rules allowed him a free mailshot to all registered voters in the constituency.

Hardee regularly appeared in his own shows at the Edinburgh Fringe. The Greatest Show on Legs debuted there in 1982. Arguably his most infamous confirmed stunt there was in 1983 when, performing at The Circuit venue – a series of three adjoining tents in a construction site with a different show in each tent – he became annoyed by what he regarded as excessive noise emanating nightly from Eric Bogosian's neighbouring performance tent. Hardee obtained a nearby tractor and, entirely naked, drove it across Bogosian's stage during his performance. Rivalling this stunt in Fringe infamy, in 1989, Hardee and Arthur Smith wrote a rave 5-star review of Hardee's own Fringe show and successfully managed to get it printed in The Scotsman under the byline of the influential newspaper's comedy critic. At the Fringe in 1996, The Independent reported that he attempted to sabotage American ventriloquist David Strassman's Edinburgh show by abducting the act's hi-tech dummy, holding it to ransom and sending it back to Strassman piece by piece in return for hard cash. The plan failed.

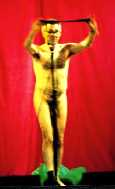
Hardee at the 2003 Glastonbury Festival

Perhaps the most-quoted anecdote concerning Hardee was that, on 9 October 1986 his house was searched by the police – who were looking for crumbs – two days after he and others stole Freddie Mercury's £4,000 40th birthday cake. No crumbs were found at the house as he had already by then donated the cake to a local nursing home. He used this incident as the title of his 1996 autobiography I Stole Freddie Mercury's Birthday Cake which he wrote with John Fleming. In another encounter with the police, Hardee was once questioned by Special Branch officers after being found on the balcony outside government minister Michael Heseltine's hotel room, wearing nothing but a pair of socks and a leather coat containing £5,200 in cash and a pack of pornographic playing cards. He had mistaken the room for that of a friend.

Collaborator John Fleming said of him that "At home, he occasionally put a live goldfish in his mouth to get attention – I saw him do it twice. It was often said of Malcolm, with a lot of justification, that he never had a stage act – his life was his act."

In his autobiography, Hardee claimed he was the first to attempt the 'banger-up-the-bum' routine, later perfected and performed by Greatest Show on Legs co-star Chris Lynam, in which a firework (occasionally a three-stage Roman Candle) was clenched between the buttocks and lit to a recording of Ethel Merman singing "There's No Business Like Show Business".

The claim for which Hardee was arguably best known throughout his performing life was that he was said to have "the biggest bollocks in show business" and he became renowned for a rarely performed but vividly unforgettable act in which he would use his own spectacles atop his genitals to create a unique visual impression of French President Charles de Gaulle with his testicles representing the politician's cheeks; this act pre-dated the Australian show Puppetry of the Penis by several years.

Hardee rarely appeared on television, though he did play minor roles in six Comic Strip TV films and one episode in the first series of Blackadder.

== Clubs ==
Hardee was also renowned as a talent spotter and owner of clubs which gave vital early exposure to up-and-coming comedians including Charlie Chuck, Alan Davies, Harry Enfield, Harry Hill, Paul Merton, Vic Reeves, Frank Skinner, Johnny Vegas and Jo Brand, with whom he had a two-year affair and whom he persuaded to become a comedian. He hosted the first-ever outing of the new circus group Ra-Ra Zoo, who performed comedy mime to a, for once, silenced audience. He also worked for a time as the manager of Jerry Sadowitz and was an occasional promoter and tour manager for his friend and neighbour Jools Holland.

His most infamous venue was The Tunnel Club, which he opened in 1984 next to the southern exit from the Blackwall Tunnel in Greenwich, South East London. He would sometimes introduce inexperienced stand-ups to audiences with the nerve-jangling line: "This next act's probably a bit shit", but once their performance was finished, he would often comfort those he thought showed promise with backstage words of encouragement and urge them to try again. According to Stewart Lee, he would often insult comedians after they had finished their acts while also simultaneously praising them, as a way of protecting their dignity. Lee notes that after his first gig he did for him, Hardee said "That was Stewart Lee. Started off well, got worse, by the end he was shit". His advice to comics who were concerned that a joke might be offensive to an audience was: "If you think it's funny, then fuck 'em."

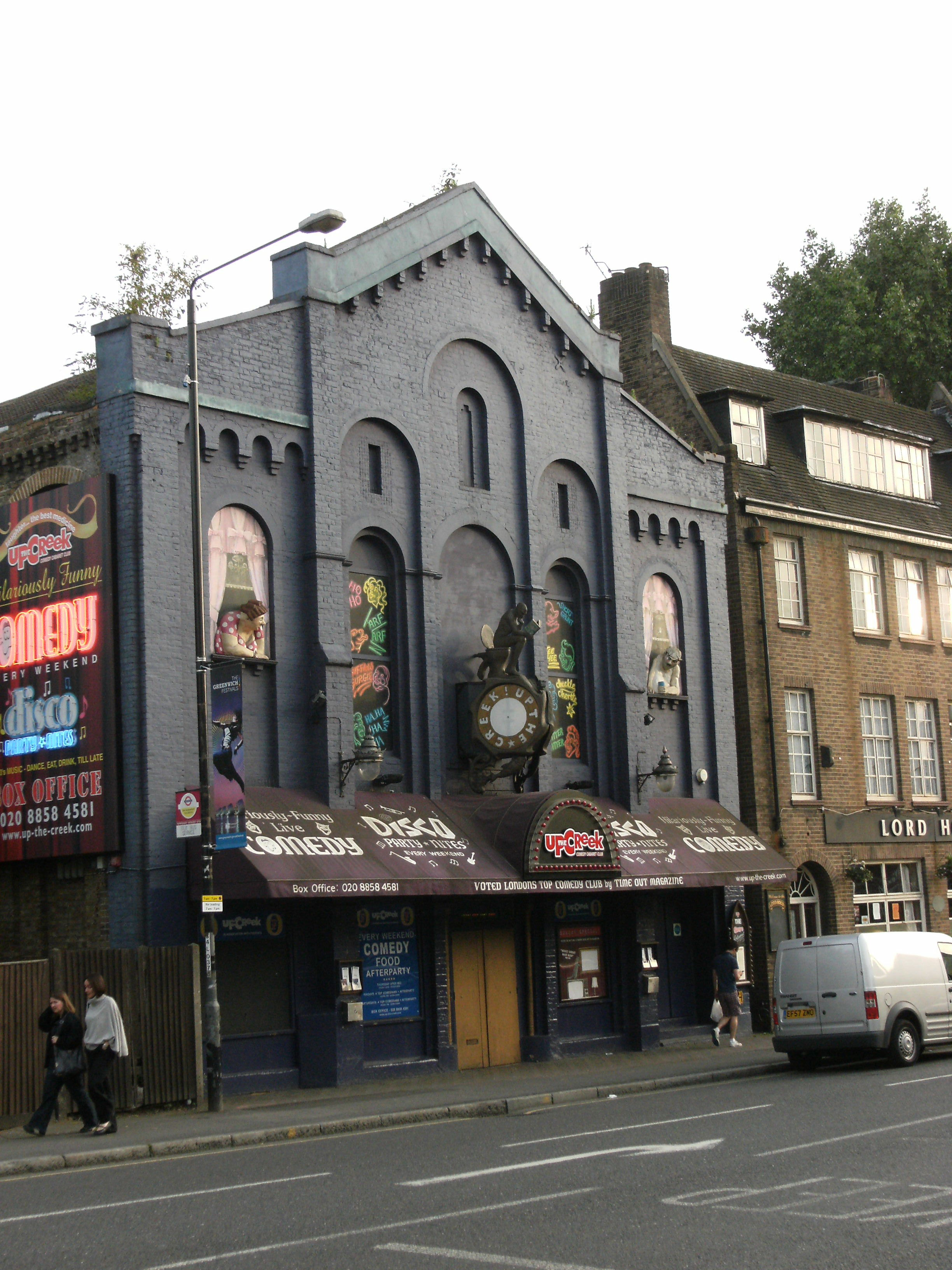
Up The Creek comedy club, Greenwich, 2011

At his weekly Sunday Night at the Tunnel Palladium shows, sometimes even experienced and accomplished comedians failed to complete a whole set against the crowd and razor-sharp heckling. When the club became established, it attracted groups of men apparently from the suburb of Eltham who Hardee referred to as 'Herberts'. They were usually drunk and attending the Tunnel club which offered after hours drinks on a Sunday night, a rarity back then. They usually ended the evening by fighting, usually between themselves, leaving everybody else as spectators. It was at the Tunnel Club that comedian Jim Tavare once began his act with the unwise opener, "Hello, I'm a schizophrenic" – to be met with the lightning rejoinder from a heckler in that night's audience, "Well, you can both fuck off then!". Julian Clary together with Fanny the Wonder dog were surprising hits at such evenings.

The Tunnel closed in 1988 and, in 1991, Hardee opened the Up The Creek comedy club in Creek Road, Greenwich. In an upstairs bar at the club was a mural commissioned by Hardee as a parody of Leonardo da Vinci's The Last Supper. It showed Hardee as Christ with Jo Brand, Julian Clary and other famous British comedians as the Disciples including Ben Elton as Judas Iscariot.

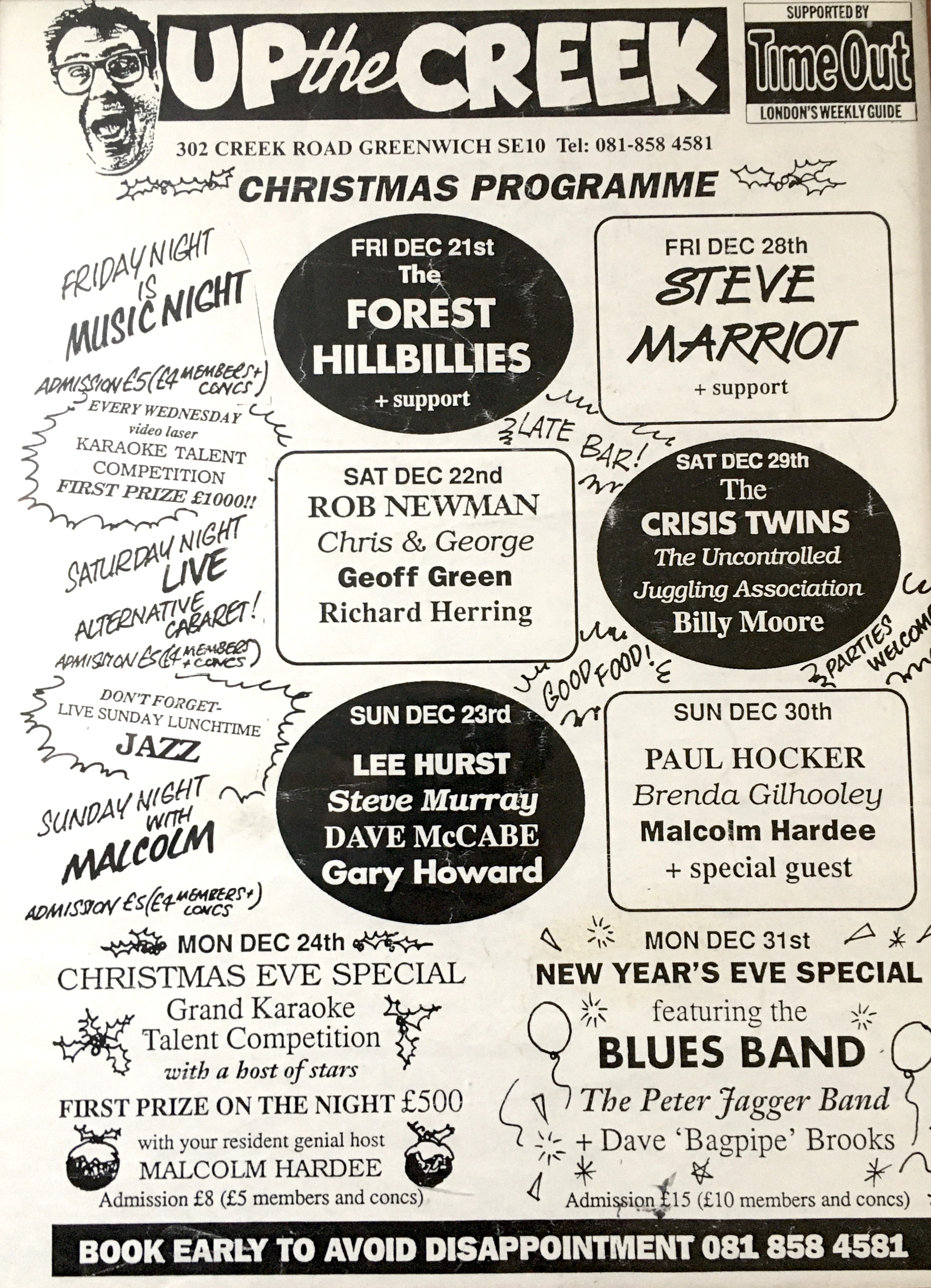

In 2001, after he sold his percentage in Up The Creek, Hardee took over a floating pub, The Wibbley Wobbley, on a converted Rhine pleasure cruiser in Greenland Dock, Rotherhithe, by the River Thames.

== Death and legacy ==
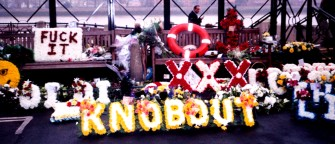
Wreaths at Hardee's funeral

On 2 February 2005, Hardee's body was recovered from Greenland Dock, after he was reported missing from The Wibbley Wobbley on 31 January; he had been last seen late-night on 30 January. A post-mortem soon confirmed he had drowned. In an inquest at Southwark Coroner's Court on 20 July, Coroner John Sampson recorded a verdict of accidental death. It had been assumed in several reports of his death that, while trying to make his way home by dinghy from The Wibbley Wobbley to his houseboat The Sea Sovereign just fifteen yards away across Greenland Dock, Hardee had lost his balance and drowned while drunk. But the Coroner found that, whilst attempting to board The Sea Sovereign from the quayside, Hardee had fallen into the dock while drunk.

Flyer for 2006 memorial show

Police constable Martin Spirito told the court that, on 2 February: "The search commenced at 10:00 am. At 10:24 am one of the officers came up and said he had found a lifeless body. I followed the officer's line down. Six metres down I saw a white male. The male had a bottle of beer clenched in his right hand." Police sergeant Roy Dawson, in charge of overseeing the dive, told the court: "The bottle was held in his right hand. It fell from his hand on the ascent."

Hardee's date of death is usually said to be 31 January, although Coroner John Sampson said, "He was last seen on the quayside outside the Wibbly Wobbly public house at about 6 am on Sunday January 30".

About 700 people attended his funeral at St Alfege Church in Greenwich. Jo Brand, Arthur Smith, Stewart Lee and his son Frank Hardee all delivered eulogies, and the musician Jools Holland played the piano. He was cremated at Lewisham Crematorium in southeast London.

In June 2005, there were two tribute shows at the Glastonbury Festival; in July, a BBC Radio 4 documentary tribute; and, in August, two tribute shows at the Edinburgh Fringe. There were five-hour tribute shows at the Hackney Empire theatre in London on 5 February 2006 and 28 January 2007 to commemorate the anniversary of his death.

== The Annual Malcolm Hardee Awards (2005–present) ==
The Malcolm Hardee Award for Comic Originality are awards given annually at the Edinburgh Fringe Festival "for comic originality of thought or performance". Previous winners:

- 2005 – Reggie Watts
- 2006 – No award presented
- 2007 – Doktor Cocacolamcdonalds
- 2008 – Edward Aczel (nominees: Aindreas de Staic, The Fringe Box Office, Peter Buckley Hill, Otto Kuhnle)
- 2009 – Otto Kuhnle (nominees: Three Gaga Heads, Tim Key, Joey Page, George Ryegold)
- 2010 – Robert White (nominees: Doctor Brown, Bo Burnham, Lewis Schaffer, Bob Slayer)
- 2011 – Johnny Sorrow (nominees: Doctor Brown, James Hamilton, Bob Slayer)
- 2012 – The Rubberbandits (nominees: James Hamilton, Simon Munnery)
- 2013 – Adrienne Truscott (nominees: Ursula Burns, Red Bastard)
- 2014 – Candy Gigi (nominees The Birdmann, Michael Brunström)
- 2015 – Michael Brunström (nominees: Richard Gadd, The Story Beast, Mr Twonkey/Paul Vickers)
- 2016 – Mr Twonkey/Paul Vickers (nominees The Baby (in Come Look at The Baby), Foxdog Studios, Arthur Smith)
- 2017 – Terry Alderton (nominees: Rob Kemp, Elf Lyons, Mark Dean Quinn.
- 2018 - no award presented
- 2019 - Julia Masli & The Duncan Brothers: LEGS (nominees Charles Quarterman, Jimmy Slim and Lewis Blomfield, Joz Norris, President Obonjo, Sean Morley)
- 2020 - (No Award made/ No Edinburgh Fringe because of the Covid pandemic)
- 2021 - (No Award made/ No Edinburgh Fringe because of the Covid pandemic)
- 2022 - The Flop: A Band of Idiots (nominee: Mr Chonkers)
- 2023 - Phil Ellis (nominees: Stephen Catling, Ivor Dembina, Mark Silcox)
- 2024 - Mark Dean Quinn (nominees: Vinay Sagar, the Duncan Brothers; Elliot Wengler; Garry Starr; Nate Kitch; Paulina Lenoir; Neil Davidson)
- 2025 - Paul Campbell (nominees: Alan Resnick, Johhny White Really-Really, Joz Norris, Liebenspiel, Lucy Pearman, Nate Kitch, Stephen Catling)
- 2026 - Yogie Belle (nominees: Jim Judges, Harriet Dyer, Kate Smurthwaite, Mad Ron, Thermos Museum Books)

The Malcolm Hardee Cunning Stunt Award is given for the best Fringe publicity stunt of the year. Previous winners:

- 2008 – Gill Smith, awarded retrospectively in 2009, for nominating herself for a Malcolm Hardee award and putting "Malcolm Hardee Award Nominee" on her posters
- 2009 – Lewis Schaffer, after convincing several publications he was sponsoring the Edinburgh Comedy Awards (or "Lewies") for the modest sum of £99 (nominees: Shed Simove, Oliver Moore, Jennifer Warren and Charlotte Jo Hanbury)
- 2010 – Stewart Lee, for successfully encouraging people to vote for little-known Japanese act Frank Chickens in a poll for best fringe performer (nominees: Manos The Greek, Arthur Smith)
- 2011 – Kunt and the Gang and Bob Slayer, for getting fans to put stickers depicting penises on the posters of rival acts (nominees: Tim FitzHigham, Sanderson Jones)
- 2012 – Stuart Goldsmith, for YouTube videos about the censorship of his show Prick (nominees Nathan Cassidy, Chris Dangerfield)
- 2013 – Barry Ferns, for printing fake copies of Broadway Baby which gave his show 6-out-of-5 star reviews and reported that his show had been nominated for the Fosters Comedy Awards, in both the main category and the newcomer category. (nominees: Richard Herring, Lewis Schaffer, Gareth Morinan)
- 2014 – Christian Talbot, for using his 12-year-old daughter Kate to go up to strangers, looking sad, asking them, "Have you seen my daddy?", and if they said "No" she would hand out flyers to them. (nominees Luke McQueen, Mark Dean Quinn)
- 2015 – Matt Roper, for hacking into the Facebook account of Malcolm Hardee judge Kate Copstick and posting fake messages "bigging himself up". (nominees Miss Behave, Abigoliah Schamaun)
- 2016 – Becky Fury, for claiming on her flyer she was a 'Last Minute Comedy finalist' - implying it was for the last minute.com awards when, in fact, it was for a Hertfordshire comedy club contest (nominees: Richard Gadd, Arthur Smith)
- 2017 – Mark Dean Quinn, for putting other acts' stars and quotes on his own flyers and thus undermining the 'star' system. (nominees Damian Kingsley, Martha McBrier)
- 2018 - no award presented
- 2019 - West End Producer, for using quotes from the names of normal people with the same names as reviewers. (nominees: Jimmy Slim & Lewis Blomfield, E4 and BBC Studios)
- 2020 - (No Award made/ No Edinburgh Fringe because of the Covid pandemic)
- 2021 - Will Mars, for mirroring the Dave TV channel's 'Dave's Joke Of The Fringe' (not awarded in 2021) by announcing that the '(Some guy called) Dave Joke of the Fringe 2021' was won by Masai Graham... The winner was chosen by a random member of the public called Dave whom Mars found by walking up the Royal Mile in Edinburgh.
- 2022 - Ivor Dembina, for his reaction to the Edinburgh bin collection strike, promoting the growing piles of uncollected rubbish as performance art.
- 2023 - (nominees: Batsu!, Lee Kyle, Tom Mayhew)
- 2024 - Thom Tuck, for performing a show which took place at a different location and a different time every day, giving out cryptic clues giving details to when and where each performance took place. (nominees: Huge Davies; Luke Rollason; Tim Reeves)
- 2025 - Dru Cripps, for fishing for punters using his flyers as bait. (nominees: Dan Boerman, Narin Oz, Rob Duncan)
- 2026 - Nate Kitch, for giving himself the award through the website Chortles.co.uk, which also gave him a 6 star review. Zoe Wohfeld was also reported to have received the award for staging a funeral for Greyfriars Bobby. (nominees: Dru Cripps, Kate Smurthwaite, Thermos Museum Books)

The Malcolm Hardee 'Act Most Likely to Make a Million Quid' Award was started in 2010. In 2024, the name of the award was changed to 'Act That Should Make a Million Quid' Award.

- 2010 – Bo Burnham (nominee: Greg Davies)
- 2011 – Benet Brandreth (nominee: Josh Widdicombe)
- 2012 – Trevor Noah (nominees: Tim FitzHigham, The Rubberbandits)
- 2013 – No award presented
- 2014 – Luisa Omielan (nominees: Peter Buckley Hill (would have won The Malcolm Hardee 'Act Least Likely to Win a Million Quid' Award))
- 2015 – Laurence Owen (nominees Sarah Callaghan, Phil Ellis, Al Porter)
- 2016 - 'The Baby' (nominees Foxdog Studios, Al Porter, Arthur Smith; The Baby was added in by the judges after the nominations were first announced)
- 2017 - Rob Kemp (nominee: Al Porter)
- 2018 - no award presented
- 2019 - President Obonjo (Nominees Candy Gigi, Catherine Cohen, Sophie Duker and Tom Crosbie)
- 2020 - (No Award made/ No Edinburgh Fringe because of the Covid pandemic)
- 2021 - (No Award made/ No Edinburgh Fringe because of the Covid pandemic)
- 2022 - Jerry Sadowitz
- 2023 - Julia Masli (nominees: Sam Campbell, Larry Owens, Seymour Mace, Natalie Perlin
- 2024 - Garry Starr (nominees: Finlay Christie; Dylan Mulvaney)
- 2025 - Phil Ellis (nominees: Alice Cockayne, Andrew O'Neill, Christopher Macarthur-Boyd, Molly McGuinness, Sam Nicoresti, Toussaint Douglass)
- 2026 - Kate Smurthwaite (nominees: Demi Adejuyigbe, Harriet Dyer, Kate Dolan, Lou Wall, Peter Michael Marino)

The Malcolm Hardee 'Pound of Flesh' Award was given in 2013 to an act which created "the kind of publicity money cannot – and perhaps should not – buy"

- 2013 – Gareth Ellis (and Richard Rose), for faking a story that they had been attacked in the street following bad reviews, which involved Rose punching Ellis so he got a black eye.

The Malcolm Hardee FirstMinute Award was given in 2016, to the show with the funniest first minute (to spoof the Edinburgh Comedy Awards that year being sponsored by lastminute.com).

- 2016 - Cat Call, performed by Cally Beaton and Catherine Bohart

== Writing ==
- I Stole Freddie Mercury's Birthday Cake (autobiography; co-writer John Fleming) Fourth Estate, 1996. ISBN 1-85702-385-4.
- Sit-Down Comedy (anthology, ed Malcolm Hardee & John Fleming) Ebury Press/Random House, 2003. ISBN 0-09-188924-3.

Hardee also wrote a number of columns in comedy magazines in which he gave tips and told anecdotes about life as a comic.
