= ISH Edinburgh Comedy Awards =

Annual awards for comedy shows at the Edinburgh Festival Fringe

The ISH Edinburgh Comedy Awards are presented to the comedy shows deemed to have been the best at the Edinburgh Festival Fringe. Established in 2023, awards are given to Best Show, Best Newcomer and a Panel Prize and are judged by a panel of judges on a voluntary basis who see all eligible comedy shows. In 2024, the awards were sponsored by Jones Bootmaker becoming the Jones Bootmaker ISH Edinburgh Comedy Awards. and since 2025 the Awards have been sponsored by figures from the Entertainment industry including James Corden.

== Format ==
The Best Comedy Show is awarded to the comedy show that the Judges and/or the audience think is the funniest.

The Best Newcomer Award is given to the best show, the one the Judges and/or the audience think is the funniest from an act doing their first full-length (45 mins and over) show at the Edinburgh Fringe.

The Panel Prize is awarded by the Judges to any individual or group that is deemed to have done something 'amazing' at the Fringe.

The Best Tech Prize is awarded by the Judges to an innovative technician and operator who creates for and aids the vision of performers through dynamic lighting and sound.

The Joke of the Fringe Prize is awarded by the Judges to a joke seen live that is deemed to be the funniest seen at the Fringe.

== History ==
Originally the ISH Edinburgh Comedy Awards were created to plug a gap when the Edinburgh Comedy Awards lost their sponsorship deal with Dave. When these Awards got a new sponsorship deal in 2023, the ISH Awards went ahead as planned.

In 2023, there were joint winners for Best Comedy Show and Best Newcomer. Paul Foot and Julia Masli jointly won Best show, and Dan Tiernan and Fiona Ridgewell jointly won Best Newcomer. The Panel Prize was awarded to Mark Simmons and Danny Ward for 'A Show for Gareth', a compilation show set up to raise money for the family of fellow comedian Gareth Richards.

In 2024, Elf Lyons won Best show, and Abby Wambaugh won Best Newcomer. The Panel Prize was awarded jointly to Alex Petty, Best in Class, Dion Owen, Elaine Robertson and Funny Women Glitter Project.

In 2025, Mark Forward and Phil Ellis jointly won Best show, and Ayo Adenekin and Amelia Hamilton jointly won Best Newcomer.

== Sponsorship ==
In 2024, the ISH Edinburgh Comedy Awards secured a sponsor Jones Bootmaker initially with an investment of £15,000 to cover the three prizes of £5,000 each for Best Show, Best Newcomer and Panel Prize. It was also announced at the May 2024 Press Launch that the winners would each receive a year's supply of Jones Bootmaker shoes. 100% of the sponsorship goes to the prizes as the awards are run on a voluntary basis.

In 2025, the ISH Edinburgh Comedy Awards were sponsored by artists and figures from the world of entertainment including James Corden, Rhod Gilbert, TakeOver Radio 106.9FM and Elf Lyons.

In 2026 it was confirmed that all four sponsors were returning along with new sponsors Sarah Millican, Mark Silcox and Romesh Ranganathan.

== Long Lists and Short Lists ==
In 2023, a list of shows were made halfway through the Fringe for the Long List and these were whittled down to shows on the Short List. For Best Show these were Ed Byrne, Ian Smith, Janine Harouni, Julia Masli, Luke Kempner, Marjolein Robertson, Paul Currie, Paul Foot, Phil Ellis, Seymour Mace and Sid Singh. For Best Newcomer these were Dan Tiernan, Fiona Ridgewell, Kelly McCaughan, Lachlan Werner, and Lorna Rose Treen.

In 2024, nominated acts for Best Show were Alfie Brown, Amy Gledhill, Ashley Haden, Colin Hoult, David Eagle, Elf Lyons, Gareth Mutch, Jordan Brookes, Mark Thomas, Mat Ewins, Phil Ellis, Raul Kohli, and Seymour Mace.

== 2023 Ceremony ==
In 2023, the ceremony was presented by Patrick Monahan and covered by BBC News. Presenters at the awards included Awards Producer Sarah Bowles, and comedians Ed Byrne and Nathan Cassidy. It was revealed at the ceremony that Cassidy was behind the inception of the Awards. Cassidy said at the ceremony he was proud of the Awards as 'it was a community coming together for something good and different – comedians, producers, critics on the panel being supportive of artists.'

== 2024 Ceremony ==
In 2024, the ceremony was again presented by Patrick Monahan. Presenters at the awards included Awards Producer Sarah Bowles, Milton Jones, Bobby Davro and awards founder Nathan Cassidy.

== 2025 Ceremony ==
In 2025, the ceremony was again presented by Patrick Monahan. Presenters at the awards included Awards Producer Sarah Bowles, Tom Stade, Mark Watson and awards founder Nathan Cassidy.

== Industry Recognition ==
In 2023, Awards Producer Sarah Bowles was awarded the Funny Women Industry Award 2023 for her work on the ISH Awards. Bowles said: "We wanted to being some positivity to the Edinburgh Fringe to help boost comedians who have struggled since Covid. We have been overwhelmed with the support we have received and recognition would only make it easier to increase the benefits to all those who work so hard in the industry."
