= Barry Ferns =

British stand up comedian

Barry Ferns is a British stand up comedian, writer, director, and a trained physiotherapist. Barry is also one of the founding members of Angel Comedy.

He is currently developing a series of podcasts whilst performing with Angel Comedy. He has developed a comedy shorts series Why Are You Doing This To Me?, films from which have been shown at the LA Comedy Film Festival and New York's Southside Film Festival. He has performed shows at the Edinburgh Festival, most recently with his show titled Barry Loves You, before then he held shows on Arthur's Seat, in 2012 and 2013 he performed at the peak for the month long festival. Barry introduced the first audio tour of Edinburgh Festival Fringe, Dial-A-Sketch, and This Show Belongs To Lionel Richie for 7 years Barry changed his name to Lionel Richie for the purpose of that show. He also runs and hosts the Angel Comedy club in Islington. He has written for School of Comedy on E4,The Bearded Ladies on BBC Radio 4, and The Milk Run on BBC Radio 1.

== Awards and recognition ==
In 2014, Ferns was nominated for a Chortle Award for Best Compere, and was retrospectively awarded the Mervyn Stutter Spirit Of The Fringe Award for his 2013 Edinburgh Fringe show The Barry Experience. In 2013 he won the Malcolm Hardee Cunning Stunt Award. In March 2015, he collected the Chortle Award for Best Small Club for his club Angel Comedy.

As a stand up comedian he has won the Comedy Store New Act competition, and was a finalist in the Leicester Square Comedian Of The Year competition.

== YouTube ==
In 2025 Barry started a YouTube channel titled Barry's Economics. It explores the psychology behind inequality and was inspired by Gary’s Economics.
