= Nathan Cassidy =

British comedian

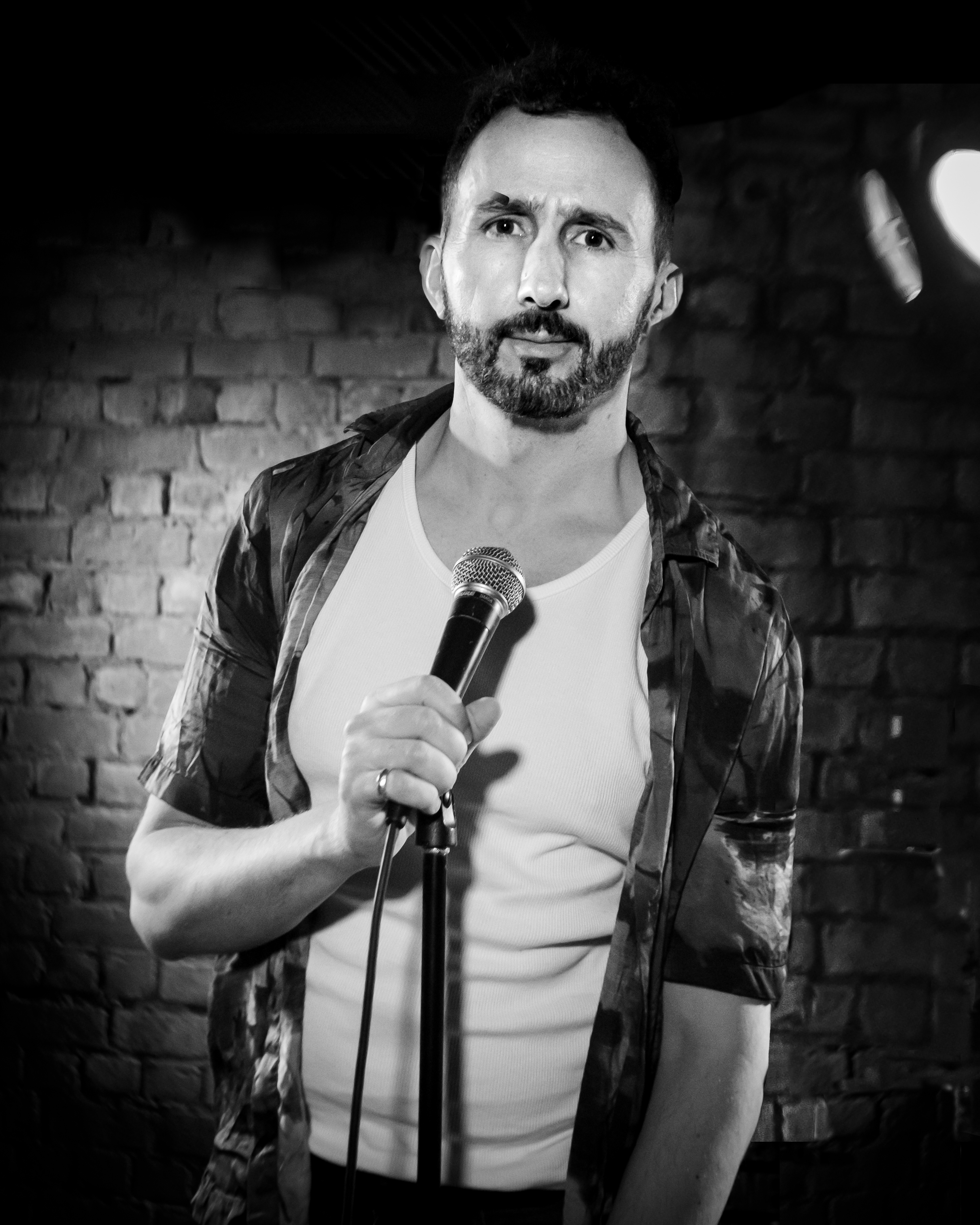
Nathan Cassidy

Nathan Cassidy is a British comedian, writer, actor and podcaster.

== Stand-up Comedy ==
After a brief spell on the UK comedy circuit in 2000–01, Cassidy became a regular on the UK Comedy circuit in 2009, and has performed solo shows at the Edinburgh Festival Fringe every year since 2010 including being the only live performer at the 2020 Edinburgh Fringe which was otherwise cancelled due to the COVID-19 pandemic.

In 2025, Cassidy's two shows 'Piracy' and 'It's Not The End Of The World' were critically acclaimed including by Kate Copstick at The Scotsman who wrote that 'Few have been as deeply moving as Cassidy' and One4Review in their 4 and a half star review calling Cassidy 'an excellent comedian'. Cassidy picked up the Best Standup Award (ongoing) again from the Pegasus Awards. The ISH Edinburgh Comedy Awards that he founded in 2023 were backed by many comedians and institutions in the industry including a £10,000 donation from James Corden. Cassidy announced a 2025 European tour of his show Observational taking in the UK, The Netherlands, Spain, Switzerland, Belgium and Luxembourg and the YouTube special of his show 'Piracy' was released in August.

In 2024, Cassidy was nominated for his show 'The Spine That Shagged Me' for Best Standup at the Shaftesbury Fringe and Buxton Fringe. At the Brighton Fringe 2024 they retired Cassidy from the Best Standup award after winning the award the two previous years, renaming the award the Nathan Cassidy Memorial Award. At the Edinburgh Festival Fringe in 2024, Cassidy picked up the Best Standup Award from the Pegasus Awards.

In 2023, his shows 'Amnesia' and 'Fifty' he was awarded with the Best Standup Award at the Brighton Fringe and 'Fifty' was nominated for Best Standup at the Buxton Fringe. 'Fifty' was subsequently released as an Amazon Prime Special.

In 2022, Cassidy was nominated for Best Standup at the Buxton Fringe for his show 'Hot Tub God' and this show along with his show 'Observational' were awarded with the Best Standup Award at the Brighton Fringe. ‘Observational’ was subsequently released as an Amazon Prime Special.

Cassidy was nominated for the 2021 Off West End Stage Awards for his show 'Bumblebee' along with nominations for Best Comedy Show at the Greater Manchester Fringe and Buxton Fringe. 'Bumblebee' was subsequently released as an Amazon Prime Special. His show 'Bumblebee' was featured in several publications as being offered up to be performed at people's houses as part of the Edinburgh Festival Fringe.

In February 2020, Cassidy's show 'Observational' was nominated for Best Show at the Leicester Comedy Festival. This show was widely reported in the press as the only live show at the Edinburgh Festival Fringe 2020. The show was given four stars by The Times which reviewed it as 'The best show at the Fringe. A classic, structured, rollercoaster Fringe hour...star-in-waiting...he is untouchable.' Also in 2020 his show 'Roses From Joe' at the Buxton Fringe was named in several online publications as the 'first solo UK comedy show after lockdown due to the COVID-19 pandemic'. In an interview with the British Comedy Guide Cassidy said that the show is about 'putting love out into the world, not to anyone in particular', like the public applauding the NHS during lockdown.

Cassidy's 2019 show 'Observational' was nominated for Best Individual Comedy at the Buxton Fringe as was his 2017 show 'The Man in the Arena' and 2016 show ‘42’ Fringe alongside comedians including Jerry Sadowitz. At the Edinburgh Fringe 2017 he won the World's Best MC Award and a 2017 Terrier Award.

In 2015, Cassidy's 2015 trilogy of Back to the Future shows were discussed in a Guardian article on how popular films have been used to 'inspire Fringe shows'. In this article Cassidy said how these shows reflected the Back to the Future films which evoke 'not only flying cars and hoverboards but ideas about different stages of life, expectations and disappointments'. He performed the shows at the Leicester Comedy Festival, at the Brighton Fringe, at the Buxton Fringe where he was nominated for Best solo comedy show and at The Gilded Balloon in Edinburgh.

In 2014 Cassidy's show 'Date of Death' won Best solo comedy show on the Buxton Fringe.

In 2012 and 2013, Cassidy gave money away to his audience in his shows 'Free Pound' and 'Edinburgh Comedy Award Winner', in the latter giving each audience member a £1 bet on him winning the Edinburgh Comedy Award. In 2013, Cassidy talked about 'Free Pound' and 'Edinburgh Comedy Award Winner' in a feature Tuesday night interview with Phil Williams on BBC Radio 5 Live, in which he said that how his grandfather saved all his life and then was unable to spend the money he had saved had inspired shows where he was now giving money away. Cassidy became the 10/1 Ladbrokes favourite for the Edinburgh Comedy Award in 2013 – after starting at 50/1, Ladbrokes dropped the odds first to 20/1 at the Brighton Fringe (as featured by The Argus) then to 10/1 during the Fringe in August 2013.

In 2010 and 2011 Cassidy performed his first two solo stand-up shows at Just The Tonic venue at the Edinburgh Festival Fringe.

Cassidy is a regular host of The Rat Pack stand-up comedy which was a multiple critics choice of Time Out. It played at the Leicester Square Theatre from 2014 to 2015 and currently has a weekly Friday night residence at the Camden Comedy Club in London.

== ISH Edinburgh Comedy Awards ==
Nathan founded the ISH Edinburgh Comedy Awards in 2023, an alternative to the long-running Edinburgh Comedy Awards. In 2024, the ISH Edinburgh Comedy Awards secured a sponsor Jones Bootmaker with an investment of £15,000 to cover the three prizes of £5,000 each for Best Show, Best Newcomer and Panel Prize. In 2025, the sponsorship was £12,500 for five prizes including new Awards Best Tech and Best Joke. The money was donated by artists and institutions within the entertainment industry, including a £10,000 donation from James Corden. 100% of the sponsorship goes to the prizes as the awards are run on a voluntary basis.

== Podcasts ==
Nathan presents the podcast Psycomedy about the Psychology of stand-up comedy and the ongoing daily comedy/piano podcast Daily Notes. Guests on Psycomedy have included Marcus Brigstocke, Shazia Mirza, Nick Helm and Stephen Bailey. His other podcast Daily Notes gathered over a million downloads by April 2024 and has been number one podcast in several countries.

== Television and Film ==
As an actor, Cassidy appeared in West End musical The Donkey Show and Channel 5 (UK) and Discovery Channel's "Serial Killers" playing the part of Stephen Sinclair, Dennis Nilsen's final victim. Cassidy has also done TV warm-up work for the Clare Balding Show (BT Sport). In 2024, Nathan played the part of the Captain in the booking.com adverts with Melissa McCarthy. In 2012 he produced feature documentary 'I am Orig' which charted a year giving money away; this was shown at the Edinburgh Banshee Labyrinth in August 2012.

== Theatre ==
In 2017 Cassidy performed “Watch This. Love Me. It’s Deep” at the Buxton Fringe and at the Edinburgh Festival Fringe. Nathan won the Sir Michael Caine Award for new writing in theatre for his play “The Cure for the Common Cold” in 2007. In 2003 his play “F-List Celebrity” was performed at the Finborough Theatre London. In 1997 his musical “DIY-The Musical” was performed at the Edinburgh Festival Fringe and in 1996 his play “Double Murder” was performed at the Connaught Theatre in Worthing.

== Radio ==
Cassidy’s radio appearances have included:

- The Colin Murray Show BBC Radio 5 Live
- The Gordon Smart Show BBC Radio 5 Live
- The Phil Williams Show BBC Radio 5 Live
- The Phil Williams Show Times Radio

== Comedy Specials ==
- Bumblebee Amazon Prime Video Released May 2022.
- Observational Amazon Prime Video Released January 2023.
- Fifty Amazon Prime Video Released December 2023.
- Amnesia YouTube Released December 2024.
- Piracy YouTube Released August 2025.

== Books ==
In 2021, Cassidy released “Resurrection’, the spoof Post-Covid Diaries of Boris Johnson. In 2022 he released his first novel “Believing in God” and in 2024 he released the book of his million downloaded podcast “Daily Notes”.

== Awards ==
- Best standup Buxton Fringe Nominee 2026
- Best standup MedFringe Nominee 2026
- Best standup Pegasus Awards Edinburgh Festival Fringe Winner 2025
- Best standup Pegasus Awards Edinburgh Festival Fringe Winner 2024
- Best standup Buxton Fringe Nominee 2024
- Best standup Shaftesbury Fringe Nominee 2024
- Best standup Buxton Fringe Nominee 2023
- Best standup Brighton Fringe Winner 2023
- Best standup Brighton Fringe Winner 2022
- Best standup Buxton Fringe Nominee 2022
- Off West End Stage Awards Nominee 2021
- Best comedy show Greater Manchester Fringe Nominee 2021
- Best solo comedy show Buxton Fringe Nominee 2021
- Best show Leicester Comedy Festival Nominee 2020
- Best solo comedy show Buxton Fringe Nominee 2019
- Terrier Award Edinburgh Fringe Winner 2017
- Best solo comedy show Buxton Fringe Nominee 2017
- Best solo comedy show Buxton Fringe Nominee 2016
- Best solo comedy show Buxton Fringe Nominee 2015
- Best solo comedy show Buxton Fringe Nominee 2015
- Best solo comedy show Buxton Fringe Winner 2014
- Malcolm Hardee Award Nominee 2012
- Sir Michael Caine Award for new writing in theatre Winner 2007

== Personal life ==
Nathan Cassidy has two children, Millie Cassidy and George Cassidy, a student at Brit School, member of band May Contain and a solo artist with three runs at the Edinburgh Festival Fringe in 2023, 2024 and 2025. He lives in London.
