= Paul Foot (comedian) =

English comedian

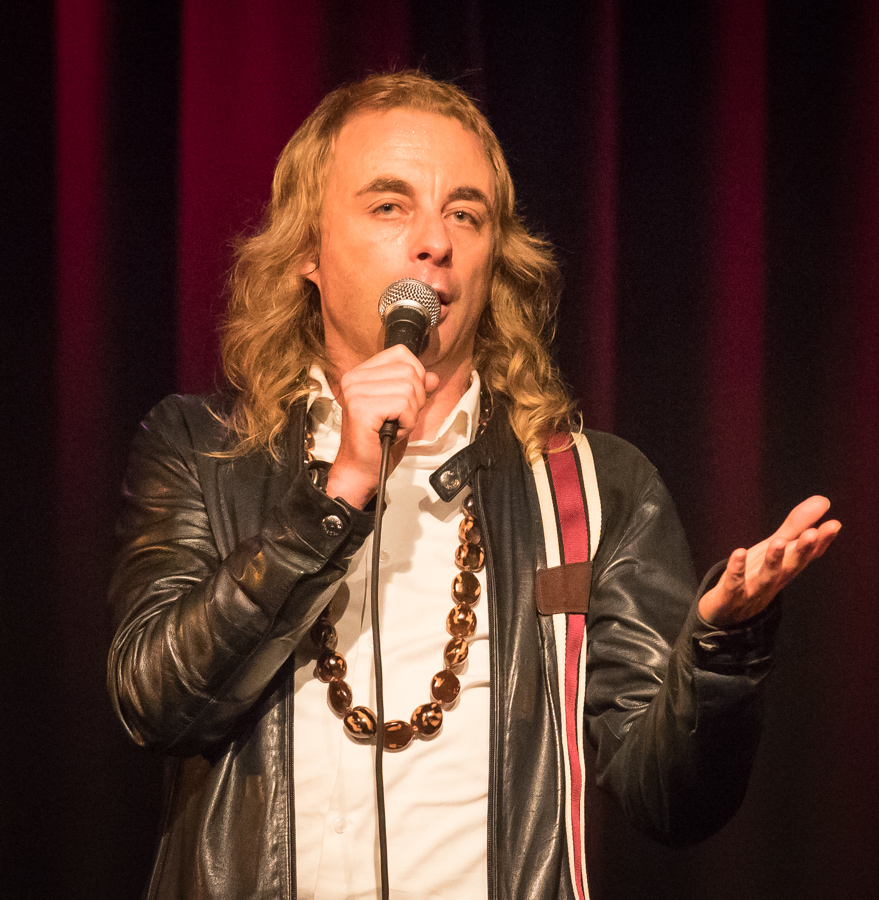
- Foot on stage at the Crap Comedy Festival in 2017
- Born: 24 December 1973 (age 52); Amersham, Buckinghamshire, England
- Education: Merton College, Oxford

Comedy career
- Years active: 1997–present
- Medium: Stand-up, television
- Website: paulfoot.tv

Paul Foot (born 24 December 1973) is an English comedian. Foot is known for his musings, rants, "disturbances" and apparent aversion to pop culture. The Daily Express likened him to "a rare exotic bird", and six national newspapers including The Independent and The Age have described him as "a comedy genius".

== Biography ==
Foot was born and raised in Amersham, Buckinghamshire, and has a younger brother. He studied mathematics at Merton College, Oxford. It was during his studies that he first started performing stand-up. Since 2011, Foot has refused to discuss his years at Oxford or former pursuits as a mathematics student. Graduating from Oxford in 1995, Foot was head-hunted by a computer software company in the run-up to the dot-com bubble, but he loathed the industry: "I had to read manuals on HTML and just write websites from scratch. None of us really knew what we were doing". He started to pursue a career in comedy by doing open mic slots at various venues.

He is gay. He has been described as "a little bit vegetarian", but has said that occasionally he does return to eating meat due to nutrition-related health issues. He has stated on his video log that he has face blindness.

For many years, Foot has sported a distinctive modified mullet hairstyle, which his hairdresser created in 2003 based on Foot's "personality". The unique haircut, which is seldom worn by other men, was reportedly christened by said hairdresser as the "Paul Foot".

== Live performances ==
Foot frequently performs live, with resident slots at various London comedy clubs. He has taken shows to the Edinburgh Fringe, such as By the Yard (2009), Ash in the Attic (2010) (which was directed by Noel Fielding) and Words (2013).

Following Edinburgh, Foot usually tours Britain with his current show before taking it to Australia after Christmas for the Australian festival circuit. He has also given runs at Montreal Comedy festival as well as performing in Sweden.

In January 2003 he often performed at London's Bearcat Comedy Club.

In 2003, Foot and Russell Brand appeared in a double act at Cafe Royal. Foot's style of comedy had a strong influence on Brand, who was inspired by Foot's eccentric hair, quirky mannerisms and love for florid language. In The Guardian, Paul MacInnes wrote about their similarities in an article that explored the notion of "copycat comedians". Bruce Dessau made similar observations in The Standard. Although a sector of Foot's fan base felt Brand had stolen Foot's act, the two were amicable at the time. In 2012, Brand made a special appearance at one of Foot's Secret Shows and they improvised a play in which Brand played Foot and Foot played actress Angela Lansbury.

== Shows ==
- Most Wanted (2003)
- Simple Pleasures (2004)
- Comedy For Connoisseurs (2007)
- Off The Top Of/With His Head (2008)
- By The Yard (2009)
- Ash in the Attic (2010)
- Still Life (2011)
- Kenny Larch Is Dead! (2012)
- Words (2013)
- Hovercraft Symphony in Gammon Sharp Major (2014)
- The Paul Foot Experience (2015)
- Paul Foot's Game of Dangers (2016)
- 'Tis a Pity She's a Piglet (2016)
- Image Conscious (2018)
- Swan Power (2021)
- Dissolve (2023)

=== Ash in the Attic ===
Foot's 2010 Edinburgh show Ash in the Attic was directed by comedian Noel Fielding and enjoyed two sell-out runs at London's Soho Theatre in February 2011. Ash in the Attic was then taken to Melbourne for the 2011 Melbourne International Comedy Festival as part of the official gala selection where it received a 5-star review in The Age. Australian Chortle wrote in its review that Ash in the Attic was "One of the best comedy shows ever to have been performed in Melbourne". A CD of the show was released.

=== Still Life ===
Foot performed eight secret London previews for his 2011 Edinburgh show Still Life before taking it to the Fringe where the show had a sell-out run at the Underbelly. Foot toured the UK in autumn 2011 with Still Life starting at the Soho Theatre on 26 September. Foot took Still Life to the 2012 Melbourne International Comedy Festival where he starred in the Comedy Festival Gala on Australia's Network Ten and was nominated for a Barry Award. Still Life also featured at the Just for Laughs festival in Montreal. The poster image for Still Life is an original artwork, a portrait of Foot amidst various fruits, by Victoria Brook.

=== Kenny Larch Is Dead ===
Foot's 2012 Edinburgh show was called Kenny Larch Is Dead. As ever with Foot, the show had nothing to do with the title. Following the Fringe the sell-out show toured Britain, before being taken to the Melbourne International Comedy Festival. The show won the Best of Fest award at the Sydney Comedy festival, and Best International Show at the Perth comedy awards.

=== Secret shows and fan following ===
In September 2006, Foot started a regular London-based solo variety show called Paul Foot's Comedy for Connoisseurs. The title comes from the name given to his fans and significant cult following, "The Guild of Paul Foot Connoisseurs", for whom Foot arranges "secret" events advertised only via his official website and mailing list. In the secret shows, Foot often enters a surreal territory, taking on the personae of his own character creations such as "Penny" and "Skeleton Johnson", and sometimes improvising elaborate mini-dramas in which he plays all of the parts. Some of Foot's characters feature on his website which also has a secret page for his Guild of Connoisseurs.

Foot's television appearances in 2010 introduced a new generation to his style of comedy, leading some "Connoisseurs of The Guild of Paul Foot Connoisseurs" unable to attend Foot's Secret Shows due to this new wave of popularity with a younger, student demographic booking them out. Foot addressed this problem by organising his first "Secret Secret Show" for his longest-serving fans. The show was not advertised anywhere on his website.

As well as secret stand-up comedy shows, Foot arranges events for The Guild of Connoisseurs such as secret picnics, spoof lectures and guided tours. In July 2011, he scheduled an event at Stepney City Farm at which connoisseurs attempted to complete a 32,000 piece jigsaw puzzle.

Foot hosts competitions within the Guild too, such as an annual tie design competition and portrait painting competitions.

=== The Paul Foot Festival ===
In 2009, Foot hosted his own all-day festival at Bethnal Green Working Men's Club in East London. Sketches included 'Foot of the Yard', a whodunnit, an Invisible Man Contest, Flamingo I-Spy, an Erotic Menu, and Paul's Rants. Foot painted portraits of members of the audience. The festival included Paul's Protégé's featuring the comedians Tom Bell and Joel Dommett. Musical performers at the festival were Birmingham gonzo-ska band Misty's Big Adventure and Antony Elvin.

== Other work ==
=== Television ===
Foot has appeared on numerous television shows including:

- FAQ U (Channel Four)
- Edinburgh and Beyond (Paramount Comedy Channel)
- Rob Brydon's Annually Retentive (BBC Three)
- Come Dine with Me (Channel 4)
- Richard & Judy (Channel 4)
- Never Mind the Buzzcocks (BBC Two)
- Russell & Katy Get Married (FIVE)
- Big Brother's Big Mouth (Channel 4)
- The 50 Funniest Moments of 2010 (Channel 4)
- Greatest Christmas TV Ads (FIVE)
- Melbourne International Comedy Festival All Star Supershow (Channel Ten – Australia)
- Russell Howard's Good News Extra (BBC Three)
- 8 out of 10 Cats / 8 Out of 10 Cats Does Countdown (Channel 4)
- Would I Lie To You (BBC One)

In 2008, Foot was a finalist in NBC's Last Comic Standing.

In 2011, Foot filmed a series of TV advertisements for Virgin Mobile in Australia. He helped to devise his character in the campaign called "Robin Da Hood", a bizarre fusion of medieval eccentricities and modern-day Australian urbanity. The first of these adverts featured an emergency phone conversation between Foot and head of the Virgin Group Sir Richard Branson.

=== Radio ===
- The Infinite Monkey Cage (BBC Radio 4) – November 2010, May 2011, August 2014, February 2016
- Chequebook And Pen (BBC Radio 4) – December 2010
- The Late Show (talkSPORT) – February 2011
- The Dave Gorman Show (Absolute Radio) – June 2012 Show 119, 120, 121
- Paul Foot Podcast (self published) – July 2009–present

==== Paul Foot Podcast ====
Since 2009, Foot has released a podcast, the Paul Foot Podcast. It was originally the highlights from his show on Resonance FM, and featured fellow stand-up comedian Joel Dommett, among other regulars. After the Resonance FM show ended, a few episodes were released independently up to May 2010. Episodes of the podcast then became more sporadic, being released every few months or so; these episodes included guests such as Trevor Lock and Paul's tour support act Malcolm Head, as well as recordings from Paul's Secret Shows.

== Awards ==
In 1997, Foot won both the BBC New Stand-up Award and the Daily Telegraph Open Mic Award, and was a finalist for the So You Think You're Funny award for newcomers. In 1998, he was nominated for the Perrier Best Newcomer Award in Edinburgh.

In 2011, Foot was nominated for a Barry Award at the Melbourne International Comedy Festival. In 2012, Foot was nominated again for a Barry Award at the Melbourne International Comedy Festival. In 2013, Foot won the top award at the Sydney Comedy festival for Kenny Larch Is Dead, which won the best show award.

In 2023, Paul's show Dissolve won jointly for best show in the ISH Edinburgh Comedy Awards,
