= Endless (private equity) =

British private equity firm

Endless LLP
- Type: Private
- Industry: Private equity
- Founded: 2005; 21 years ago
- Headquarters: Ground Floor, 12 King Street, Leeds LS1 2HL, England
- Key people: Garry Wilson (co founder and managing partner); Darren Forshaw (co founder and senior partner)
- Website: http://www.endlessllp.com/

Endless is a British private equity firm. It is headquartered at Ground Floor, 12 King Street, Leeds, with an office at 102 Park Street, London W1.

Endless has invested in West Cornwall Pasty Company, Crown Paints, and Theo Fennell. In April 2006, the firm acquired GlynWebb, which it sold on four months later. In March 2011, Endless acquired T. J. Hughes for an undisclosed sum.

In March 2017, Endless bought Jones Bootmaker, saving 840 jobs according to the BBC. In July 2017, the firm bought the luggage company Antler Luggage from fellow private equity firm Lloyds Development Capital (LDC). In July 2018, it announced that The Works, which it bought out of administration (rescued from insolvency) in May 2008 for around £17 million, would have an IPO, and a valuation of £100 million. In 2019, Endless acquired Victoria Plum.

In November 2020, the company bought Hovis. Endless agreed a sale of the firm in August 2025 to Associated British Foods for £75m, which was brought before the Competition and Markets Authority, who agreed the sale could proceed in June 2026.

In November 2026, Endless acquired Weston Homes, a residential developer.
