= Pavers Shoes =

Footwear business in the UK and Ireland

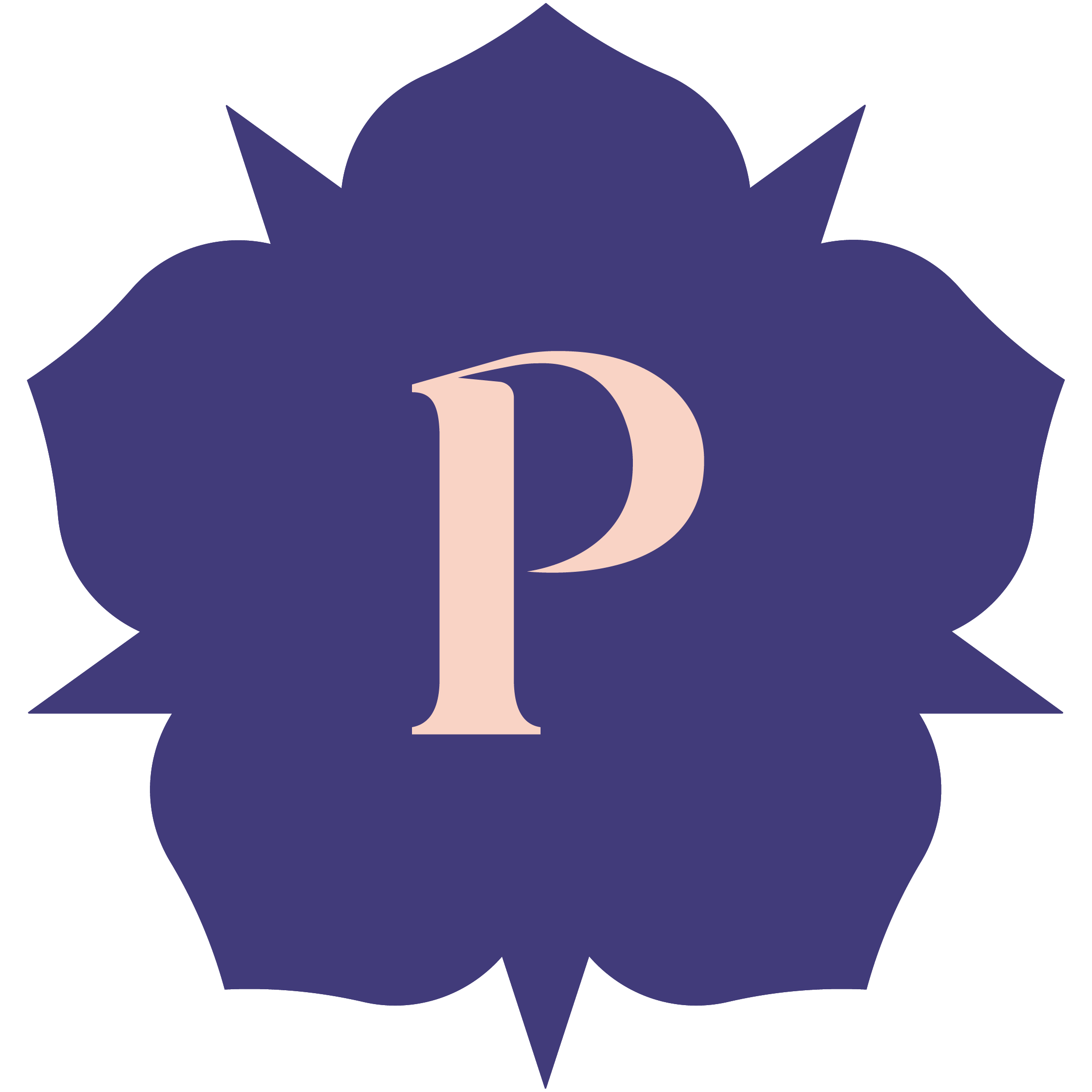

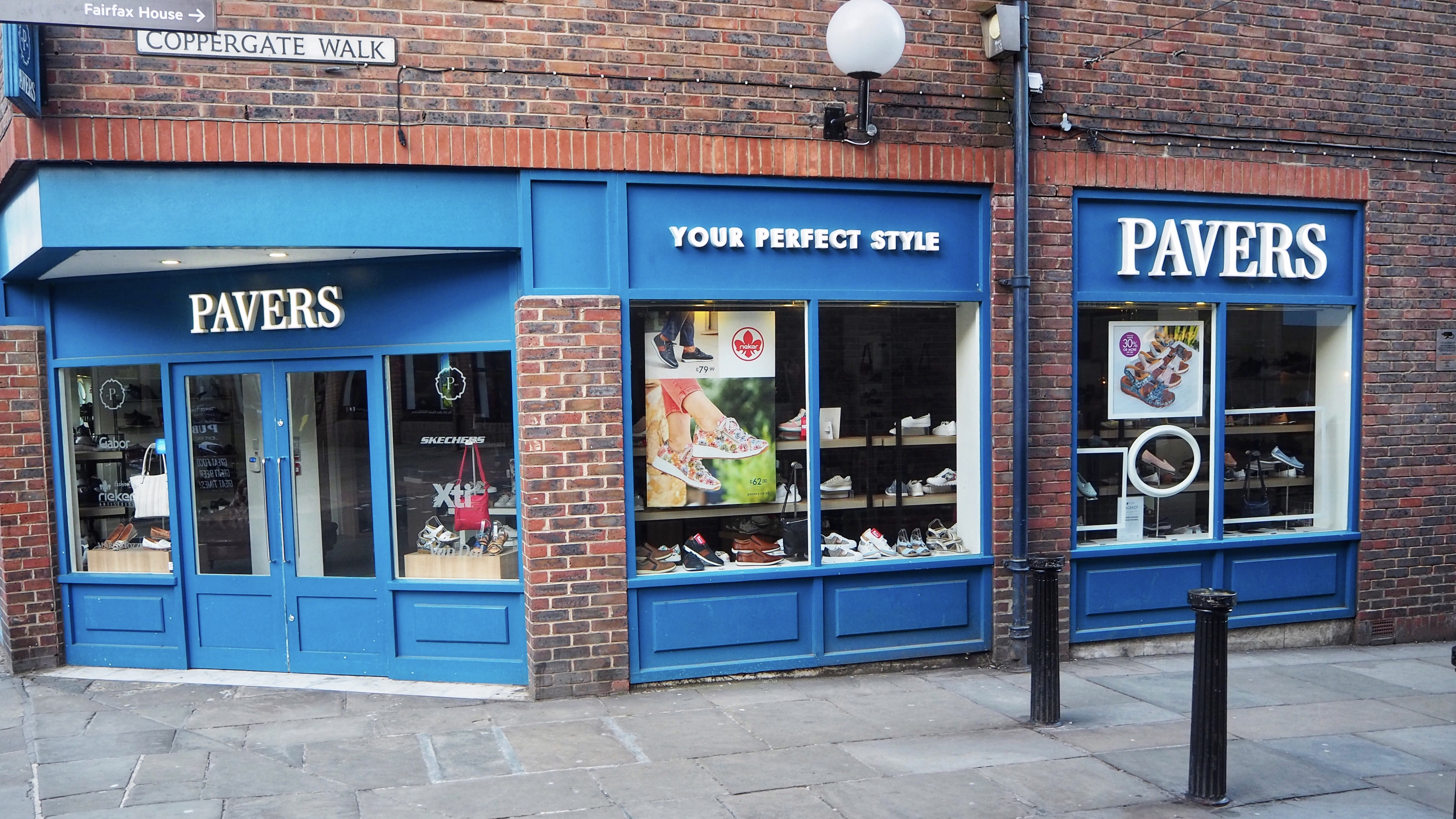
- Shop on Coppergate, York
- Type: Family business
- Industry: High Street retail
- Founded: 1971; 55 years ago York, England
- Founder: Catherine Paver
- Headquarters: York, England
- Number of locations: 100+ shops (2013)
- Area served: United Kingdom; Ireland; United States
- Products: Footwear
- Revenue: £65,000,000 (2008 estimated)
- Number of employees: 1000+ (2013)
- Website: www.pavers.co.uk; pavers.ie; pavers.us

Pavers Ltd, also known as Pavers Shoes, is a family-owned footwear business operating in the UK and Ireland. Pavers currently has more than 100 stores, all managed from the head office in York.

The company has grown rapidly in recent years and online. In 2011, Pavers launched its 24-hour TV footwear shopping channel on Sky.

Pavers was established by Catherine Paver in 1971, with a £300 bank loan (equivalent to £4,000 in 2025), initially by organising shoe parties with clearance stock from shoe catalogues. The first shop was opened in Scarborough, along with stores in York and Hull. The shop in Newcastle soon followed.

The first shop was opened in 1996 at the Royal Quays outlet centre in North Shields. The company currently has outlet stores from Loch Lomond in Scotland, to Trerulefoot in southeast Cornwall.

== Directors ==
Pavers continues to be a family-run business, run by Cathy's son Stuart Paver as the managing director. Ian and Graham Paver, Cathy's two other sons, have now both retired.

Stuart, along with Middlesbrough-based Steve Cochrane, owner of the Psyche Department Store, set up a sister company in 2000 to sell footwear online. This company recently amalgamated with Pavers, which brought the online shoe ordering ability with it.

== Lifetime achievement award ==
Founder Cathy Paver was given a lifetime achievement award by her peers at the 2007 Drapers Footwear awards, 36 years after starting the company.

== Charity work ==
Pavers supports several UK-based and international charities. In 2006, through a limited edition shoe design, they raised £45,000 for Marie Curie Cancer Care.

For the past 10 years, the company has been involved with sponsoring and supporting children in third-world countries. Currently, Pavers is sponsoring three children through Compassion International.

== Expansion ==
In 2008, Pavers announced the opening of its new business, Pavers England Footprints Limited, in Chennai, India.

Pavers England Limited (PEL) is a joint venture between Pavers Ltd. and the Foresight Group. At a press launch, Pavers revealed that they expected a sales turnover of $10 million.

As part of the project, Pavers announced they would commission a $3 million footwear design studio in Chennai.

In February 2018, Pavers acquired Jones Bootmaker from administrators in a pre-pack deal. They also purchased specialist online retailer Herring Shoes in July 2018.
