= Will Mars =

British comedian

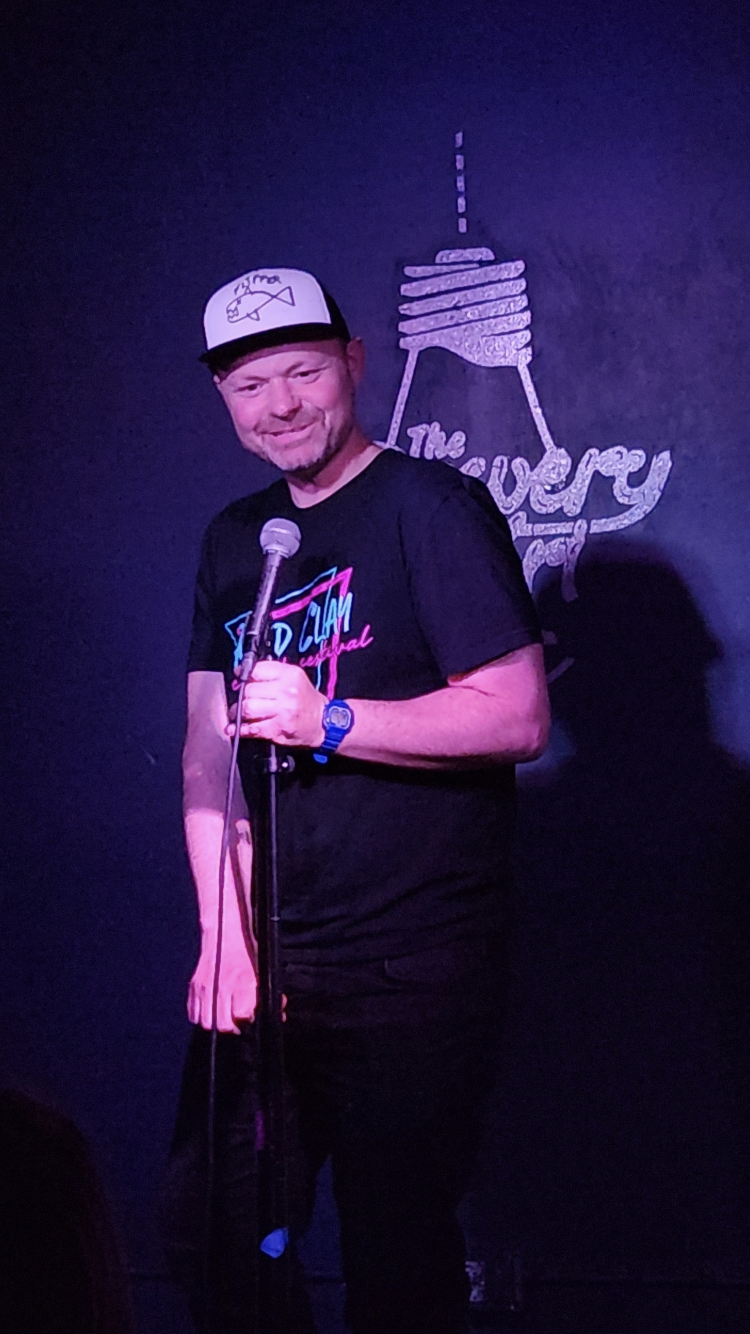
- Mars performing in New York [circa 2022]
- Born: William Mars; 1980-1982 (aged 41-43); Warwickshire, England
- Partner: Sarah Lee (2018-present)
- Children: 2

Comedy career
- Years active: 2009-present
- Medium: Stand-Up, Television
- Genre: autobiographical . black humour . satire . one-liners
- Website: www.willmars.com

William Mars is a British comedian, writer, producer and director.

== Career ==
Mars began performing stand-up comedy in the United Kingdom in early-2009.

During these early years, Mars created and produced the critically acclaimed, Joke Thieves show. This show has appeared regularly at the Edinburgh Festival Fringe since 2013 and has been produced for television in both the U.K. and the U.S. The show is now hosted by Mars and recorded regularly as a podcast on Spotify.

Mars relocated to the United States in early 2014. In late 2016 he attended an open-call audition at the Apollo Theater, Harlem, as an amateur comedian, and became a finalist in the venue's talent hunt. This led to him making his U.S. network television debut on the 25th Anniversary Special of Fox's Showtime at the Apollo alongside comedians Steve Harvey, Tracy Morgan and Gabriel Iglesias.

In 2018, Mars made several appearances on Season 8 of NBC's Trial by Laughter becoming a series finalist.

Mars won the only award given out at the Edinburgh Fringe in 2021, The Malcolm Hardee Cunning Stunt Award.

At the Edinburgh Fringe in 2022, Mars debuted his 10th solo hour show, Will Mars: My Life in One-Liners. The show received favourable reviews from well-known fringe critics including Sharon Lougher of Metro, Kate Copstick from The Scotsman and Bruce Dessau of the Evening Standard and beyondthejoke.co.uk. Mars was also nominated for best show in the Amused Moose Comedy Awards.

== Television appearances ==
- Stand Up for Comic Relief BBC [2012]
- Showtime at The Apollo FOX [2016]
- Trial by Laughter NBC [2018]

== Live shows ==
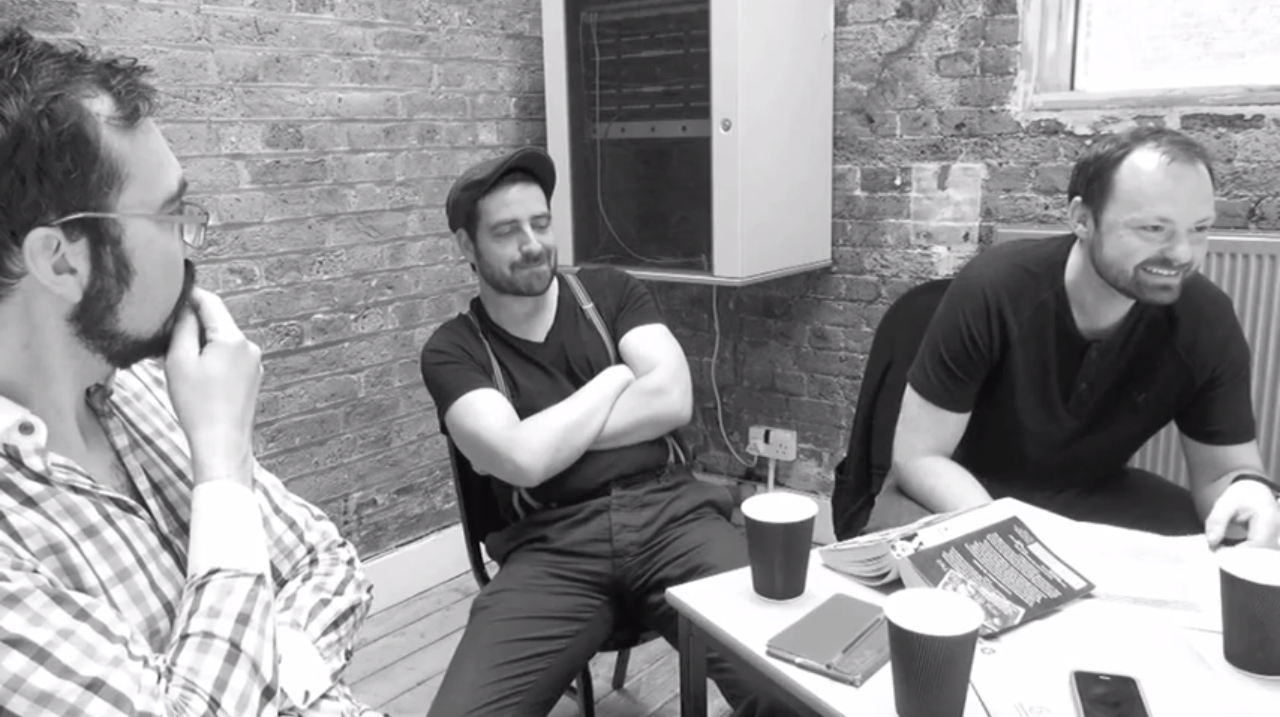
Mars in London rehearsals for the 'Routines' show [2015]

- 2012 Will Mars - Ruination (Edinburgh Festival Fringe)
- 2013 Will Mars - Americana (Edinburgh Festival Fringe & UK Tour)
- 2013-19 & 2021 Joke Thieves (Edinburgh Festival Fringe)
- 2014 Will Mars - As Good As My Audience (Edinburgh Festival Fringe)
- 2015 Will Mars - Outspoken White Guy (Edinburgh Festival Fringe & World Tour)
- 2015-19 Sketch Thieves (Edinburgh Festival Fringe)
- 2015 Routines (Edinburgh Festival Fringe)
- 2016 Will Mars - Schtick Shift (Edinburgh Festival Fringe & Asia Tour)
- 2017 Will Mars - This (Edinburgh Festival Fringe)
- 2018 Will Mars - Candid Cafe (Edinburgh Festival Fringe)
- 2019 Will Mars - Phoenix (Edinburgh Festival Fringe)
- 2019 The Mars & Lee Show (Edinburgh Festival Fringe)
- 2021 Will Mars - My Life's A Joke (Edinburgh Festival Fringe)
- 2022 Will Mars - My Life in One-Liners (Edinburgh Festival Fringe)
