= Trevor Lock =

English comedian, actor and playwright

- Born: 2 September 1973 (age 53); Lincolnshire

Comedy career
- Years active: 1997 – present
- Medium: comedian, actor, playwright
- Website: trevorlock.co

Trevor Lock (born 2 September 1973) is an English comedian, actor and playwright. He is noted for the circuitous and surreal nature of his comedy.

== Early life ==
Trevor Lock grew up in the Northamptonshire villages of Flore and Bugbrooke and joined Flore cubs and later Bugbrooke Scouts. In 1983 he was awarded cub of the year by the Flore cub pack. As a young teen he played cricket for both Bugbrooke Cricket Club and Bugbrooke St Michael's 74 as well as U13 and U14 cricket for Northamptonshire County Cricket Club and Little Houghton where he was a teammate of Mal Loye. When he was 15 he became ill with ME (Myalgic Encephalomyelitis) and a missed a year of schooling at Campion School before going on to study philosophy at University College London.

== Career ==
=== Stand up ===
He has toured the UK supporting both Stewart Lee and Russell Brand and appeared at the Edinburgh Fringe. He is a founder member and co-host of the comedy cabaret Kool Eddy's in London, which he also took to the Edinburgh Fringe festival. In 1999 Lock appeared in Number One Show with Daniel Kitson and Andrew Maxwell at The Gilded Balloon.

In 2006 he performed a one-off hour of stand-up Edinburgh Fringe show, When I was a Little Girl – The Very Best of Trevor Lock, at the Gilded Balloon Teviot Wine Bar, Edinburgh and appeared in Cloud Cuckooland, a work-in-progress for a forthcoming BBC Radio show with Russell Brand and Matt Morgan, at the Smirnoff 'Underbelly', Cowgate. Trevor also supported Russell Brand on a number of dates for his stand-up show Shame. In November 2007 Lock addressed the Oxford Union on the meaning of life, 'disproving' Descartes' maxim "Cogito ergo sum" by tipping a glass of water over his head. In 2009, Trevor Lock performed a warm up show for the Edinburgh Fringe Festival at a fundraiser for Boxmoor Cricket Club. He had two shows in the 2009 Edinburgh fringe; a stand-up show called Some Kind of Fool and a play titled The One and the Many

Lock presented a live comedy night 'Trevor Lock's Philosophy Society' at the Ku Bar in Lisle Street near Leicester Square. In early 2011 Lock revealed plans to tour with Chris Dangerfield in the UK with a series of gigs held exclusively in people's living rooms called Live in My Living Room. and went on to tour living rooms from the likes of Sadie Frost to students who charged on the door.

In 2017 The Scotsman awarded Lock's new show 'Community Circle' five stars, describing it as 'an absolute masterclass in comedy performance'. Lock continues to perform Community Circle at each year's Edinburgh Fringe, and in 2021 and 2022 he also performed 'We Are Each Other' which The Guardian describes as satisfying 'our yearning for the community'

Between 2005 and 2008 he worked with Paul Foot as a writer and a double act partner appearing live and on Television in 'Edinburgh And Beyond'.

=== Radio ===
Lock has had two of his plays broadcast on Afternoon Play on BBC Radio 4: Something You Should Know and Travel Sick. Both of which were co-written with his then-partner Sem Devillart and the latter deals with his time travelling in Peru.

Lock appeared with Russell Brand and Matt Morgan on Brand's Saturday night BBC Radio 2 show, and appeared alongside the pair on Brand's Sunday morning show on BBC Radio 6 Music. He was often referred to by the nickname 'Cocky Locky'.

He was often teased by his co-hosts for supposedly being cruel to animals, as well as for telling several stories involving a boot coming through a ceiling and lying or inventing anecdotes. The first of these themes came after a show based on the theme, "What Have I Done To Deserve This?" in which Lock told a story in which the parish vicar noticed a mouse had drowned in Lock's fish-tank. Brand and Morgan would regularly deride Lock about this and other anecdotes, exaggerating them for comedic purposes.

The show also featured "Trevor's Sonic Enigma" which Brand and Morgan dubbed "Trevor done a Noise". This was meant to be a short clip of sound effects and voices (all done by Lock) which would enable listeners to guess the title of a song. These enigmas were mocked for being misleading, confusing or overly long. Winners were invited to join the presenters in the studio the next week. Another regular item was "Challenge Trevor" in which Lock was set a list of undesirable challenges by the listeners. These ranged from eating lemons to serenading Noel Gallagher with an Oasis song in Lock's Elvis Presley voice.

A running joke was that Brand would shout at Lock: "Eat your fudge!". This catchphrase stemmed from a particular broadcast when Brand presented him with large quantities of the foodstuff (in a short-lived attempt to "be nice" to him). The catchphrase was continued for the duration of the 6 Music show, and people went as far to shout out the phrase at his stand-up shows.

=== Television ===
Between 1998 and 1999, Lock regularly appeared in the Lee and Herring BBC Sunday lunchtime show, This Morning With Richard Not Judy. He was mocked weekly by Stewart Lee for having a "small face", but was not allowed to speak as this would mean him having to be paid more. He also appeared in two episodes of Time Gentlemen Please, once in the first series in 2000, and once in the second series in 2002. In 2003, he appeared in BBC3's Brain Candy. Lock played a variety of roles in Channel 4's Star Stories including Michael Parkinson, Billy Bob Thornton, Glenn Hoddle, Emilio Estevez and Ant McPartlin.

=== Theatre ===
Since the late 2010s he has moved away from stand-up and towards staging largely improvised events where the focus is on the audience rather than the performer. In 2018 he presented The Trevor Lock Experience at the Edinburgh Fringe, which involved audience members sitting in a circle observing and commenting on each other, under Lock's loose guidance. In 2021 he presented We Are Each Other at Summerhall in Edinburgh. This theatre piece involved Lock acting as a facilitator to let audience members get to know each other and form an impromptu family-like group.
