= Anna Thomas (comedian) =

Welsh comedian

- Born: 3 November 1993 (age 32)
- Education: University of York
- Occupation: comedian
- Known for: winner of the BBC New Comedy Award in 2021

Anna Rose Thomas is a Welsh comedian who won the BBC New Comedy Award in 2021.

== Life ==
Thomas was brought up in Burry Port in Wales.

Thomas has appeared on British TV when she won the BBC's New Comedy Award in November 2021. She came through one of the six regional heats won £1,000 and a 30-minute mentored audio slot for the BBC.

In 2023, Thomas was a finalist in the inaugural Sean Lock Comedy Award.

In October 2025, Thomas began co-hosting a weekly podcast with Phil Ellis, Early Worms.

In 2026, Thomas took her debut show How to Juggle a Ferret to the Edinburgh Fringe Festival, detailing her experiences with grief.A joke from the show was listed as one of the Ten Funniest Joke of the Fringe by The Guardian.
