= Raul Kohli =

English stand-up comedian

- Born: Raul Kohli
- Occupations: Comedian and broadcaster

Raul Kohli is an English stand-up comedian and broadcaster from Newcastle upon Tyne. He initially performed as Rahul Kohli, but changed his stage-name to differentiate himself from the actor with the same name. He won the NATYs award in 2017, and was nominated for Best Show at the ISH Edinburgh Comedy Awards in 2024.

== Career ==
=== Broadcasting ===
Kohli presents the podcast Tyne Travel, A Comedian’s History Of The North-East with co-host Mike Milligan. He also presented the podcast Comic Sanskrit for BBC Asian Network. He also wrote and starred in his own BBC radio show How We Ruined the Internet and performed stand-up comedy recorded live for BBC Asian Network.

He was a member of the Channel 4 presenting team for England national football team friendly international against Bosnia and Herzegovina in June 2024. He is a supporter of Newcastle United and presented podcasts for BBC Sounds on the club. He also appeared as a guest on the live football coverage for BT Sport.

=== Stand-up comedy ===
He made his Edinburgh Fringe Festival with his debut one man show Newcastle Brown Male in 2016.

Kohli performed a completely improvised stand-up comedy hour at the Edinburgh Festival for four consecutive years.

He performed his stand-up comedy show Raul Britannia at the 2024 Edinburgh Festival. It was nominated for Best Show by the ISH Edinburgh Comedy Awards.

== Personal life ==
He became interested in comedy by watching Comedy Store stand-up on television as a teenager. He is the son of a Hindu Indian and a Sikh Singaporean, raised in Newcastle upon Tyne.
