= Gerard Lyons =

British economist (born 1961)

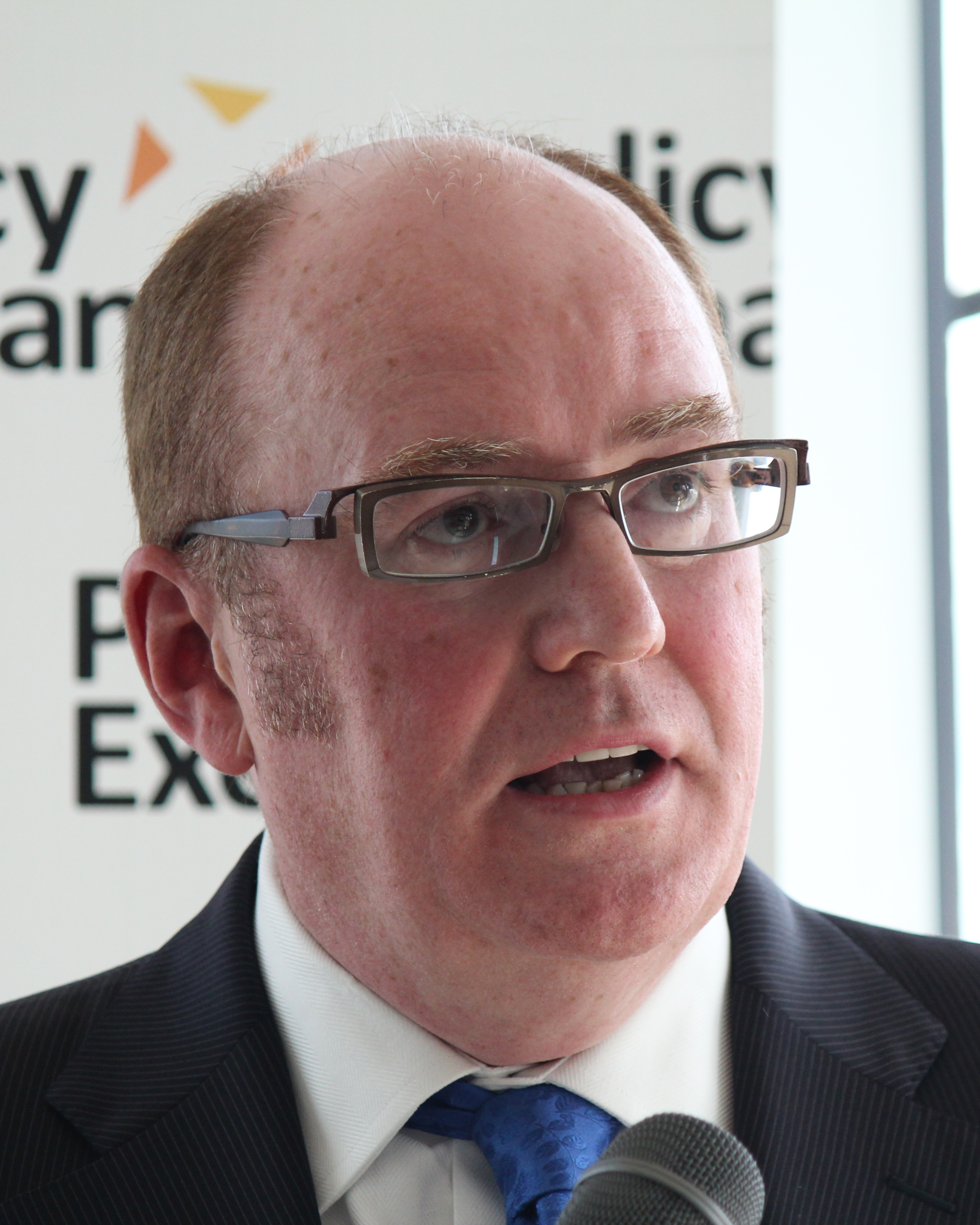
- Lyons at a Policy Exchange conference, September 2014
- Born: Gerard Patrick Lyons; 31 March 1961 (age 65); Marylebone, London, England

Academic background
- Education: University of Liverpool (BSc); University of Warwick (MA); Queen Mary, University of London (PhD)

Academic work
- Discipline: Political economy International economics Financial economics
- School or tradition: New Keynesian economics
- Website: www.drgerardlyons.com

Gerard Patrick Lyons (born 31 March 1961) is a British economist.

== Early life ==
Gerard Lyons belongs to an immigrant Irish Catholic family from Kilburn, North West London.

Lyons attended St Mary's Primary School in Kilburn and Cardinal Vaughan Memorial School in Holland Park, London. He studied at the University of Liverpool followed by a Masters in Economics at the University of Warwick. In 1985, he completed his PhD at Queen Mary, University of London.

== Career ==
=== Financial sector ===
Lyons started his career as an economist at Chase Manhattan Bank in the Europe Area Office from 1985 to 1986. From 1986 to 1989 he was the Chief UK Economist at Swiss Bank Corporation. From 1989 to 1999 he was Chief Economist and Executive Director at Dai-Ichi Kangyo Bank. Then from 1999 to 2012, Lyons was the Chief Economist and Group Head of Global Research at Standard Chartered Bank, where he was in charge of a division of about 180 staff. In 2010 and 2011, Lyons' team at Standard Chartered was ranked as the top forecasting team globally by Bloomberg. On leaving Standard Chartered, The Times wrote that Lyons "(had) become one of the most influential pundits on the global economy".

Prior to this Lyons reinforced his own reputation as an accurate forecaster with being one of two British economists predicting in August 2008, a month before Lehman Brothers collapsed, a deep imminent recession. He anticipated a GDP fall of 1.6% for the third quarter of 2008 when the consensus predicted a rise of 0.9%. Other accurate contrarian calls include correctly predicting that the Lawson Boom would end in a bust, as well arguing for the economic benefits of leaving the European Exchange Rate Mechanism. Regarding the latter, Lyons wrote in The Observer in 1992 that "[S]omething will have to give: either the government's exchange-rate commitment or the economy," and he has called the euro "probably the worst economic idea ever thought up by anyone anywhere at any time".

Lyons is Chief Economic Strategist at Netwealth, an independent non-executive director at the Bank of China, and a Senior Fellow at the think tank Policy Exchange. Lyons also sits, since 2008, on the Advisory Board of the Grantham Institute – Climate Change and Environment; and has been a member of the Advisory Board of Warwick Business School since 2014.

=== Public sector ===
In 1999, Lyons was a member of the 'Commission on the £ Sterling', established by the Leader of the Opposition William Hague. He and Ruth Lea wrote up the Commission's findings.

He has testified to United States Congress and Senate about the rise of State Capitalism and Sovereign Wealth Funds.

He was the Lead Advisor on Prime Minister Gordon Brown's first Business Council for Britain, 2007–08.

He sat on Councils of the World Economic Forum between 2009 and 2014.

On 11 December 2012, the Mayor of London, Boris Johnson, announced that Lyons was to join his team as his Chief Economic Adviser. During his first term, Lyons had been a member of Johnson's informal panel of economic and business advisers, speaking at a number of events at City Hall on London's global position during the term of the previous Mayor, Ken Livingstone. He began the role a month later in January 2013 and left in April 2016, at the conclusion of the Mayor's term. While at City Hall Lyons championed the London living wage, co-chaired, with Munira Mirza, the London Strategic Migration Partnership Panel, represented the Mayor on the Board of City UK and sat as a member of the GLA's Investment Performance Board and gave testimony to the Commission's second report, in 2016.

Because of his connection with Johnson and knowledge of emerging economies, he was considered for the 2019 appointment of Governor of the Bank of England.

Lyons was described to have been then-prime minister Liz Truss's "favourite economist", and provided external advisor during her leadership bid, although he did not have contact with her once she became prime minister. He was initially a prominent supporter of the supply-side reforms in Truss's "mini-budget", writing two days after its unveiling that it "will boost growth and everyone will benefit." However, as reported in The Guardian and the Financial Times, Lyons co-authored a paper for Truss before she became prime minister which warned: "The markets are nervous about the UK and about policy options. If immediate economic policy announcements are handled badly then a market crash is possible."

== Books ==
- The Consolations of Economics
- Clean Brexit: How to Make a Success of Leaving the European Union (co-authored with the journalist Liam Halligan).

== EU Referendum ==
Previously a vocal opponent of the UK joining the Exchange Rate Mechanism and euro currency, Lyons is an advocate of "Clean Brexit", and co-founded Economists for Brexit to provide the economic case for leaving. He publicly criticised the use of the £350 million figure on the side of the Vote Leave bus, and suggested that a net figure of £163 million a week should have been used.

In April 2016, Lyons suggested that food would be suddenly cheaper after Brexit.

== Personal life ==
Lyons is married to painter Annette Lyons, with whom he has three children, including comedian and actress Elf Lyons. Together with his daughter Elf, they host a podcast about economics.
