= Sean Lock Comedy Award =

British awards ceremony

- Awarded for: Talented new writers and performers who embody the alternative comedic spirit of Sean and Channel 4
- Country: United Kingdom
- First award: 2023

Television/radio coverage
- Network: Channel 4

The Sean Lock Comedy Award is an annual award created by Channel 4 in 2023, awarded to the best new writer or performer who embodies the "alternative comedic spirit of Sean and Channel 4".

Recipients of the award receive £5,000 to support their performing work, plus a £1,000 commission from Channel 4 to create a comedy script. Winners receive support and mentoring sessions from Channel 4's commissioning teams and comedy department.

The award was created to honour the memory of Sean Lock, who died from cancer in 2021. Fellow comedian and close friend Bill Bailey worked closely with Channel 4 to create the award. Bailey said, "I am delighted that Channel 4 have created the Sean Lock Comedy Award. It's a way to honour Sean's memory and to inspire others to pursue their own unique comic brilliance."

The inaugural winner of the award in 2023 was Eric Rushton. The following year, the award was given to Harriet Dyer, and in 2025 it went to Tom Towelling.

== Winners and Nominees ==
=== 2023 ===
- Eric Rushton
- Alex Bertulis-Fernandes
- Mamoun Elagab
- Kyrah Gray
- Kuan-wen Huang
- Christopher Macarthur-Boyd
- Tadiwa Mahlunge
- Mike Rice
- Lorna Rose Treen
- Anna Thomas
- Lily Webb

=== 2024 ===
- Harriet Dyer
- Jin Hao Li
- Shalaka Kurup
- Marty Gleeson
- Elaine Robertson
- Leah Davis
- Pravanya Pillay
- Ricky Balshaw
- Millie Malone
- Marjolein Robertson

=== 2025 ===
- Tom Towelling
- Samira Banks
- Emer Maguire
- Paul Hilleard
- Limahl Germain
- Dane Buckley
- Thor Stenhaug
- Sharon Wanjohi
- Sydney May
- Roger O’Sullivan
