= Lewis Schaffer =

American comedian

- Born: March 30, 1957 (age 69); Brooklyn, New York
- Other name: Brian Simpson
- Occupation: Stand-up comedian
- Website: www.lewisschaffer.co.uk

Lewis Schaffer is an American broadcaster and comedian, based in Nunhead, south-east London, England, where he moved in 2000. He hosts a weekly radio show on Resonance 104.4FM in London, once appeared regularly on GB News, occasionally tours Britain as a stand-up comedian. He does not have a 2026 calendar.

== Career ==
Schaffer's show "Free until Famous" ran from October 2008 until April 2014 at a venue in Soho and later at The Rancho Grill in Mayfair, London. His show was the "longest running solo stand-up show in London and perhaps all of Britain", running in excess of 400 performances.

Schaffer performed his show "Lewis Schaffer: American in London" every Sunday at the Leicester Square Theatre in London for over three years until June 2014.

He has hosted "Nunhead American Radio with Lewis Schaffer" on Resonance 104.4FM London since 2009. The show is broadcast live every Monday at 5:00PM GMT.

In 2009, he won the Malcolm Hardee Cunning Stunt Award for best publicity stunt at the Edinburgh Festival Fringe for persuading the magazine The List that he would be sponsoring the Edinburgh Comedy Awards. Schaffer said he had purchased the naming rights to the awards for £99 and his mother would be on the judging panel.

On July 3, 2025, while appearing on GB News discussing the cost of disability benefits, Schaffer suggested that disabled people should be killed off, either by starvation or by shooting them. After his comments received backlash for echoing Nazi rhetoric about disabled people he repeated them on X.

On October 12, 2025, while appearing as a guest on GB News, Schaffer was asked to comment on remarks made by another guest about Donald Trump. In response, Schaffer made a personal remark about the guest’s appearance, stating, “I can’t even listen to him—look at how fat he is.” The comment prompted criticism from the programme’s host, Dawn Neesom, and fellow guest James Matthewson, who condemned the remark and criticized the channel, stating, “These are the Donald Trump supporters.”

Lewis Schaffer has been livestreaming daily on Lewis Schaffer: Uncooked on YouTube, generally at 5PM UK (12Noon NYC) since June, 2025. He streamed 355 dates in his first year.

== Personal life ==
In September 2019, Schaffer was assaulted while he was cycling in south London. He received treatment for a broken nose and facial wounds at King's College Hospital in Denmark Hill.

In addition to his radio work, Schaffer hosts a daily livestreamed broadcast on his YouTube channel titled "Lewis Schaffer Uncooked", alongside occasional late-night live streams. The streams typically feature unscripted commentary, interactions with viewers, and discussions on current events and comedy.

In his personal life, Schaffer is single and has frequently incorporated his search for a partner into his public commentary and comedy material.
