= Joke Thieves =

Joke Thieves is a conceptual stand-up comedy show format created and hosted by the British comedian Will Mars. It was first staged at the London comedy club Downstairs at the King's Head in June 2013. The show later debuted at the Edinburgh Festival Fringe that year, drawing capacity crowds nightly, and again at the 2014 and 2015 festivals. Joke Thieves has since toured internationally, featuring a changing line-up of established stand-up comics, character comedians and occasional sketch groups. After a couple of years of one off performances, the Sketch group version of the show enjoyed its first full run at the Edinburgh Fringe in 2015.

In August 2014, Joke Thieves was piloted for BBC television by The Comedy Unit, prior to a feature on the BBC Radio 4 Extra Edinburgh Festival edition of The Comedy Club.

In 2015 Joke Thieves made its North American debut in New York and later went on to debut in Los Angeles during 2016

In 2021, Joke Thieves was piloted for Comedy Central U.S. by Hat Trick Productions,

In 2023, Joke Thieves began recording regular live shows at the Backyard Comedy Club in London for release via Spotify,

== Format ==
Four or six comedians are introduced to the audience, who then divide into pairs. Each act performs a selection of their own material that their allocated partner must then perform in the latter half of the show, allowing the audience to see each comedian deconstructing each other’s acts.

== Critical response ==
Joke Thieves has received critical acclaim and was described as "appallingly funny", "savage" and "truly electric". The Independent describes the attraction of the format: "The appeal is obvious. Joke Thieves gives audiences a glimpse of the workings behind the mic stand. Acts deliver sure-fire laughs with their usual material in the first half before having the rug pulled from under them as they step up a second time with unfamiliar set-ups and punchlines. Most enjoyably, it really brings out the comedians’ competitive side. Determined that someone else should not spin more laughs out of their material than they do, acts often perform their hardest-to-imitate routines in the first half."

The Guardian observed that "In music, you only cover the work of an artist you admire. In Joke Thieves, you don't have that choice. The event made me think less of the opportunities for cover-version comedy than the obstacles to it – how possessive comics are of their material; how blurred is the line between a comic's material and their very soul."

Critics observed that the tackling of another comedian's material in the latter half of show can - albeit rarely - lead to potential battles between comedians. The Guardian described such exchanges as "deep professional antipathy reconstituted as comedy", while reviewing the paired performances of Tania Edwards and Des Clarke: "Performing their own material, neither seemed to have made life particularly tricky for the other. But when they swapped, sparks flew."

== 2015 international tour ==
Joke Thieves announced a tour for March/April 2015, playing to houses at the Adelaide Fringe and the Melbourne International Comedy Festival, in addition to seasons in Hong Kong, Manila, Singapore and Iceland.
