= Ed Aczel =

British stand-up comedian

Edward Aczel, also billed as Ed Aczel is a British stand-up comedian and actor. He is known for his "anti-comedy" style of clumsy delivery presenting as uninterested and lacking belief in both his material and performing skills.

His 2008 Edinburgh Fringe Festival show, "Do I Really Have to Communicate with You?", was described by Zadie Smith in The New Yorker as "one of the strangest, and finest, hours of live comedy I’d ever seen". James Kettle in The Guardian called him "perhaps Britain's greatest living anti-comedian".

Winner of the 2008 Malcolm Hardee Award for Comic Originality, he was the runner-up in both the 2005 BBC New Comedy Awards and Jimmy Carr's Comedy Idol in 2004, which was filmed for the extras on Jimmy's 2005 Live DVD).

His 2010 Edinburgh show featured in the BBC Comedy Collection.

As an actor, he has appeared in two episodes of the soap opera EastEnders, 2018 film The Favourite, series 2 of Mandy, Lee and Dean and Doctors.
