= Phil Ellis =

English stand-up comedian

- Ellis in 2026
- Born: Phillip Michael Ellis; 16 October 1981 (age 45); Preston, Lancashire, England
- Occupation: Stand-up comedian
- Years active: 2008–present
- Known for: Taskmaster (2025)
- Notable work: Phil Ellis Is Trying (2018–2020)

Phillip Michael Ellis (born 16 October 1981) is an English stand-up comedian, actor, and writer. His TV appearances include Drunk History (2016), The Russell Howard Hour (2017), The Tez O'Clock Show (2019), Roast Battle (2019), and Redknapp's Big Night Out (2021).

In 2023, Ellis's Edinburgh Festival Fringe show Phil Ellis's Excellent Comedy Show won the Malcolm Hardee Award for Comic Originality and was nominated for the Edinburgh Comedy Award. He competed in the 20th series of Taskmaster in 2025.

== Early life ==
Ellis was born in Preston, Lancashire. He grew up in the Fulwood and Plungington areas of Preston. He attended Archbishop Temple School in Preston, and then Runshaw College in Leyland.

His interest in comedy began as a child when he would ask his mother for comedy VHS tapes, which she would buy from the Asda where she worked, including Bottom, The Young Ones, The League of Gentlemen, and Red Dwarf. Ellis cites Rik Mayall, Bob Mortimer, Sean Lock, Lee Mack, Steve Pemberton, and Reece Shearsmith among his influences.

Ellis later attended University of Staffordshire, graduating in 2002, and was awarded a third in media and production. Afterwards, he moved to Sandbach in Cheshire, and worked at an airbag factory for a number of years and at Domino’s as a pizza delivery driver.

== Career ==
=== Stand-up ===
Ellis "started writing down all the silly, funny and absurd thoughts I had", which led to him trying out stand up. His first gig was at the Comedy Balloon in Manchester. Deciding to pursue a career in comedy, Ellis spent most of his twenties "moving from one house share to another" in order to fund his gigs.

In autumn 2025, Ellis announced his show Bath Mat will tour from 9 December 2025 through 15 January 2027, including a 5-night run at the Soho Theatre in London.

=== Edinburgh Fringe ===
Ellis has performed at the Edinburgh Fringe every year since 2013. He won the Edinburgh Comedy Award Panel prize in 2014 for Funz and Gamez, a children's game show featuring adult jokes. In his shows, he is known for making up lies about his personal life; a major premise of his 2013 show Phil Ellis: Unplanned Orphan is that his parents told him at 30 he was adopted, and in a later show he claimed to have two children. In 2023, his show Phil Ellis's Excellent Comedy Show won the "Malcolm Hardee Award for Comic Originality" and was nominated for the Edinburgh Comedy Award.

Ellis's 2025 show Soppy Stern won the "Malcolm Hardee Award for Act That Should Make a Million Quid" and was a joint-winner for Best Show for the ISH Edinburgh Comedy Awards; speaking about winning the award, Ellis said: "Winning one Malcolm Hardee award was a dream, but winning two is overwhelming. It means a lot to have so much support from people". Ellis also brought back Funz and Gamez for a two-week run entitled Funz and Gamez Rebootz, which won Best Fringe Kids Show at The List Festival Awards.

=== Television ===
In 2016, Ellis appeared as a seaman on series 2 episode 6 of Drunk History, during Joe Lycett's re-telling of the Battle of Trafalgar. In 2017, he performed stand up on an episode of Russell Howard's Good News. In 2019, Ellis appeared in Roast Battle, competing against Johnny Vegas, who ultimately won the episode. Also in 2019, he appeared as himself on Jack & Phil's Power Hour. Ellis featured on an episode of Sunday Brunch in 2025.

In July 2025, Ellis was announced as a contestant of the 20th series of Taskmaster along side Ania Magliano, Maisie Adam, Reece Shearsmith and Sanjeev Bhaskar. He initially tied for first place with Magliano and Adam, but lost a tiebreaker challenge to Adam and ultimately came joint-second.

=== Radio and podcast ===
Ellis wrote and starred in three series of his own BBC Radio 4 show, Phil Ellis is Trying, which ran for twelve episodes from 2018 to 2020. He starred as "a man trying – and failing – to make a success of his life". Written by Ellis alongside Fraser Steele, additional cast included Johnny Vegas, Lolly Adefope, Amy Gledhill, Katia Kvinge, Terry Mynott, and Mark Lamarr.

In October 2025, Ellis launched his podcast Early Worms with comedian Anna Thomas.

== Reception ==
Ellis's shows at the Edinburgh Fringe have received many positive reviews: he was described by The Guardian as "a helter-skelter hour of fun", by Broadway Baby as "one of the finest and funniest comedians in the UK today", and by The Skinny as a "conductor of chaos".

== Personal life ==
Ellis briefly moved back into his parents house in Preston in his early thirties where he shared residence with a rat (as mentioned on the Shagged Married Annoyed podcast, but eventually moved back out again and rented a flat with five other people in Finsbury Park.

In 2026, Ellis had a hair transplant.

In 2026, Ellis started wearing corrective eye glasses

== Awards and nominations ==
Ellis has been nominated for, and won, several awards including:

- 2014: Winner – Edinburgh Comedy Awards Panel Prize (Funz and Gamez)
- 2019: Nominee – BBC Audio Awards (Phil Ellis is Trying)
- 2023: Nominee – Edinburgh Comedy Awards Best Show
- 2023: Winner – The Malcolm Hardee Award for Comic Originality
- 2025: Winner – Best Compere - The Chortle Awards
- 2025: Winner – The List’s Best Fringe Kids Show (Funz and Gamez)
- 2025: Winner – The ISH Edinburgh Comedy Awards Best Show (award shared with Mark Forward)
- 2025: Winner – The Malcolm Hardee Award Act That Should Make a Million Quid

== Filmography ==
=== Film ===
Year	Title	Role	Note
2018	Eaten By Lions	Ice Cream Man	

=== Television ===
Year	Title	Role	Note
2010	Phil's III	Writer	
2012	The Tape Face Tapes	Various	BBC Comedy Feeds, pilot
2015	Funz and Gamez	Writer, host, and associate producer	BBC Comedy Feeds, pilot
2016	Drunk History	Second English Seaman	One episode
2017	The Russell Howard Hour	Himself	One episode
2017	Born Silly	Writer	
2018	Life Lessons	Phil	One episode
2019	The Tez O'Clock Show	Ensemble	Two episodes
2019	Jack & Phil's Power Hour	Himself	One-off comedy special
2019	Roast Battle	Himself	One episode
2020	There She Goes	Captain Banana Crackers	One episode
2021	Redknapp's Big Night Out	Hooligan	One episode
2025	Tell Me When You're Bored from Rob Copland	Ensemble	
2025	Sunday Brunch	Himself	
2025	Taskmaster	Himself	Contestant; series 20

=== Radio ===
Year	Title	Role	Notes
2018–2020	Phil Ellis Is Trying	Phil	3 series, BBC Radio 4
2021	Backchat	Hans	BBC Radio 4
2023	Where To, Mate?	Phil	BBC Radio 4
2024–2025	Icklewick FM	Mayor Stanley Power	BBC Radio 4
2025	Humanwatch	Roving Reporter	BBC Radio 4
2025	Loose Ends	Himself	BBC Radio 4

=== Edinburgh Fringe shows ===
Year	Title	Notes
2008	Phil Ellis: Why I Bathe In Ajax	
2011	Comx	
2013	Phil Ellis: Unplanned Orphan	
2014	Funz And Gamez	
2015	Funz And Gamez Tooz	
2016	Phil Ellis Is Alone Together (But Mostly Alone)	
2017	Phil Ellis Has Been On Ice	
2017	Funz And Gamez: Flogging A Dead Horze	
2018	Phil Ellis Is Ready For The Big Time	
2019	Phil Ellis: An Revoir	
2022	Phil Ellis: Hedgehog	
2023	Phil Ellis's Excellent Comedy Show	
2024	Funz And Gamez - Returnz	
2024	Phil Ellis: Come On And Take The Rest Of Me	
2025	Funz And Gamez rebootz	
2025	Phil Ellis: Soppy Stern	
