= Angel Comedy =

Comedy night in London, England

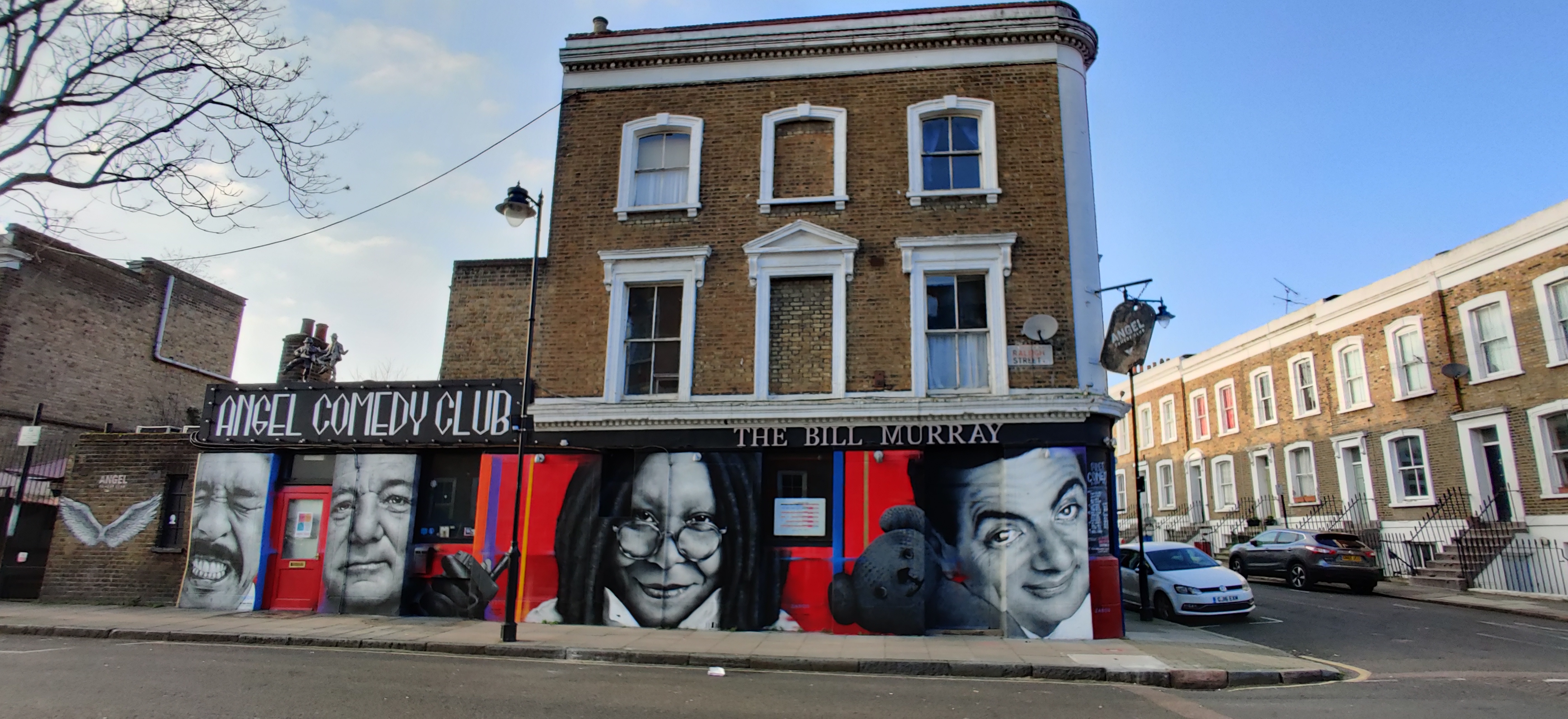
The Bill Murray Pub, home to Angel Comedy

Angel Comedy is a comedy night in London, based at pubs such as The Camden Head and the Bill Murray.

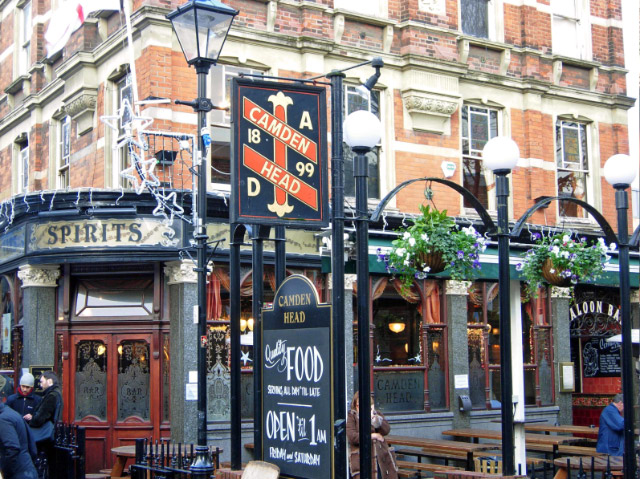
The Camden Head

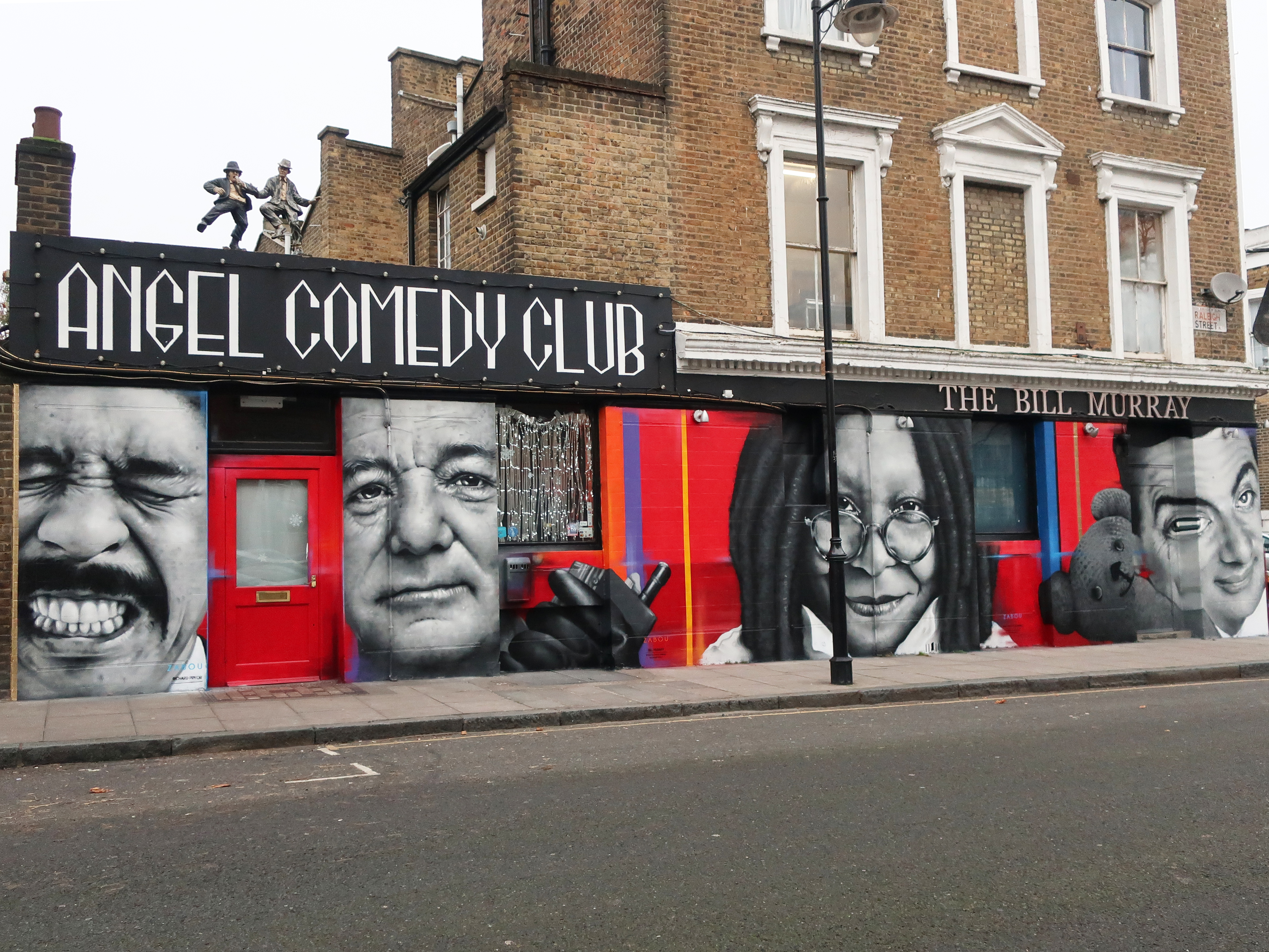
The outside of The Bill Murray (2019)
