= Harriet Dyer (comedian) =

English stand-up comedian and writer

- Born: Harriet Louise Dyer; 1983 or 1984 (age 42–43); Truro, England
- Education: University of Wolverhampton

Comedy career
- Years active: 2010–present
- Medium: Stand-up; television
- Subjects: Mental health; Neurodiversity

Harriet Louise Dyer (born 1983 or 1984) is a Cornish stand-up comedian and writer. Her comedy specialises in topics surrounding mental health and neurodiversity. While having appeared numerous times at the Edinburgh Fringe, she has also notably appeared on television in Live at the Apollo and 8 Out of 10 Cats Does Countdown. In 2024, she received the second Sean Lock Comedy Award, handed out by Channel 4.

Dyer has been open about her mental health difficulties, which have formed the basis for her comedy.

== Personal life ==
Dyer was born and grew up in Truro, Cornwall. She was abused in her teenage years, which she touches upon in her later works and which led to addiction and mental health issues as an adult.

Dyer completed a BTEC in Performing Arts at Truro College in 2004 and went on to graduate with a Bachelor of Arts (BA) in Drama and Performance from the University of Wolverhampton in 2008. During university, Dyer suffered from alcoholism and almost dropped out. She later moved to Birmingham, and then Manchester for eight years, where she resided notably close to Strangeways Prison. She currently lives in Bristol, with a male partner.

Dyer has bipolar disorder. During the COVID-19 pandemic, she realised she experienced partial deafness — having previously relied on lip-reading, which mass masking heavily restricted — for which she now wears hearing aids. A clip of her recounting this on 8 Out of 10 Cats Does Countdown went viral, with over three million views.

== Career ==
Originally intent on becoming a nurse as a child, she began dabbling in comedy while at university. She recalls her course containing a module dedicated to stand-up comedy; her issues with alcohol at the time limited her ability to work with others, and she had not prepared for the module assessment. She produced a piece ad-hoc, which she described as her "waffling on about some eventful occurrences that had happened in my life and everyone loved it", and that she "knew then that that's what I wanted to do".

While based in Manchester, she set up Barking Tales, described as "a night for comedians to speak candidly about mental health issues while still being funny". The idea for this came from her 2014 Fringe show, Barking at Aeroplanes.

Her other shows at the Edinburgh Fringe include What a Palaver! (2011 and 2012), Ain't it Awkward (2013), We'd Prefer Someone a Bit More Mainstream (2016), Dyergnosis Murder (2017), That's Not a Lizard, That's My Grandmother and The Dinosaur Show (both 2019), Trigger Warning (2022), Mother (2023), Skin (2024), produced by Phil McIntyre Live. Her latest show is Easily Distra..., which debuted at the Fringe in summer 2025, and toured throughout autumn 2025. Trigger Warning won the Neurodiverse Review's inaugural Neurodiversity Representation Award. She released a version filmed in Bristol online in 2023.

She has appeared numerous times on television, on Live at the Apollo and 8 Out of 10 Cats Does Countdown (both in 2025), as well as The Russell Howard Hour, Rosie Jones' Disability Comedy Extravanganza, Comedy Central Live and Meet the Richardsons (for which she has also written). On radio, she has appeared on Elephant in the Room, The 13 Million Club (both BBC Radio 4), and The Good, The Bad & The Unexpected (BBC Radio Scotland). She was also a judge in the first heat of the 2025 BBC New Comedy Awards.

In 2020, she released a book entitled Bipolar Comedian.
