= Chris Dangerfield (writer) =

English writer, raconteur

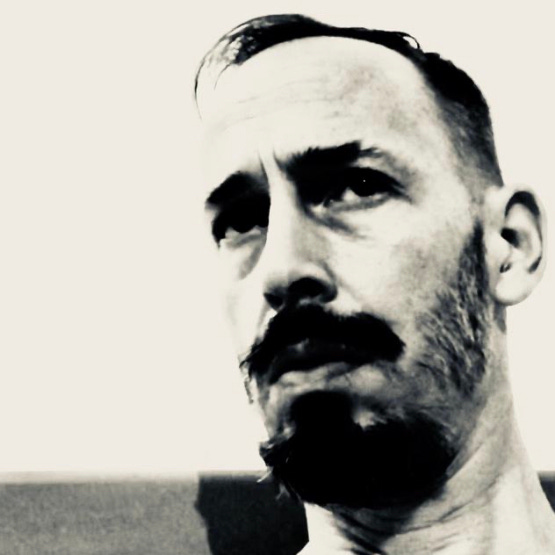
- Dangerfield in Cambodia taken by himself and used with permission
- Born: Christopher Stuart Dangerfield; Dartford, Kent, England

Comedy career
- Years active: 2008–
- Medium: YouTube, Author, Spoken word
- Website: chrisdangerfield.com

Christopher Stuart Dangerfield is an English writer, story teller, and former stand-up comedian. His material often discusses prostitution and drug use based on his own life experiences.

He has regularly attended the Edinburgh Festival Fringe. Since 2018 he lived in Cambodia, having previously lived in Soho, London.

== Early life ==
Dangerfield was born in Dartford, Kent, attending The Downs School. He studied contemporary art and music at Dartington College of Arts before going on to post-graduate study at Leeds University where he read Marxism, psychoanalysis and French post-structural thought, achieving a master's degree. After years describing himself as a Marxist he rejected the idea in 2016 on his YouTube channel named 'Dangerfield'

== Career ==
=== Stand-up comedy ===
His stand-up show Sex Tourist was performed as a one-off special at The Comedy Cafe, Shoreditch in August 2012. It sold out in 2 days, beating the 20-year record of the venue. that established Dangerfield as a radical and original comedy voice.

During his 2014 show Sex With Children, Dangerfield was sent a courgette by the feminist organisation, Feminist Avengers, who also targeted Jimmy Carr and Jim Jefferies, with the instruction to "Go fuck himself".

Dangerfield has claimed that he once toured with fellow comic Trevor Lock, performing for people in their own front rooms, from Sadie Frost and Boy George , to Student kitchens. He has appeared with Rupert Everett on the Channel 4 show Love for Sale discussing how he once spent £150,000 on Chinese prostitutes and BBC Three's Prostitution: What's The Harm where he defended the right of prostitutes and punters alike.

=== Cultural criticism and YouTube ===
After ten years of performing stand-up, Dangerfield quit and began a solo podcast 'Dangerfield's Sunday Prescription'. Dangerfield later started a YouTube channel, where he has live streamed almost daily, chatting with his subscribers about culture, art, politics, literature, drugs and current affairs. He also interviews guests occasionally, such as psychologist Jeffrey Schaler who discussed the weaponisation of mental health with Dangerfield.

=== Writing ===
Dangerfield's first novel, Tired, etc, was published in 1998. On the 1st of December 2025 Ugly Mink published a new novel by Dangerfield called 'Love in the Time of Nudie Mags'. Dangerfield continues to upload short stories regularly on his Substack.
