= Elf Lyons =

British stand-up comedian, writer and actress

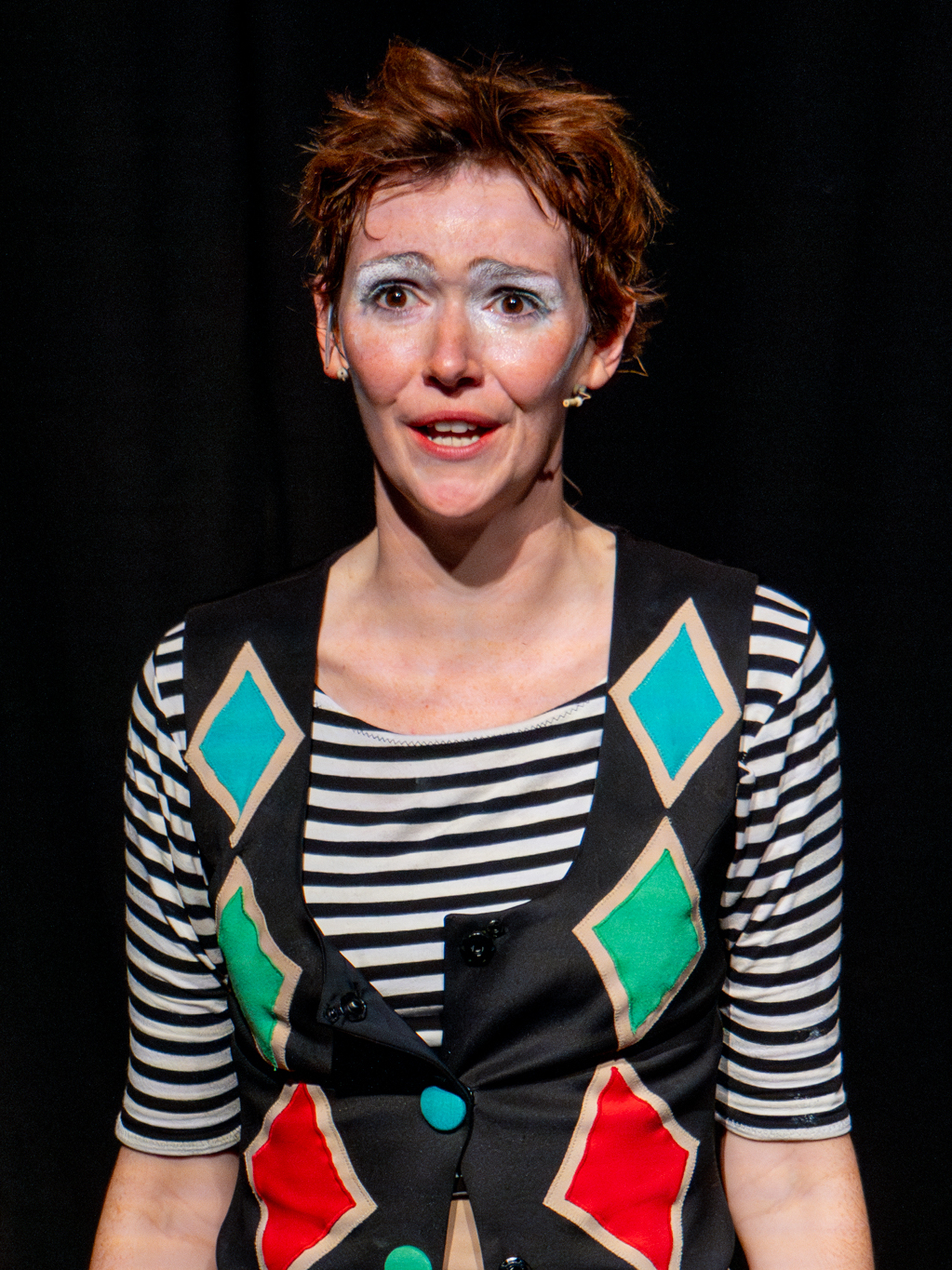
- Lyons at the 2024 Edinburgh Festival Fringe
- Born: 1991 (age 34–35)
- Education: Bristol University BA; Queen Mary University of London MA
- Occupations: Comedian, writer, actress
- Parent(s): Gerard Lyons; Anette Lyons

Emily-Anne "Elf" Lyons (born 1991) is a British stand-up comedian, writer and actress.

== Early life ==
Lyons is the daughter of economist Gerard Lyons. Her mother, Annette, is a painter and she has two siblings. She earned a BA in Drama from Bristol University and an MA in Theatre & Performance from Queen Mary University of London. She then studied at École Philippe Gaulier in Étampes, France.

== Career ==
Lyons was the runner up for a Funny Women award in 2013. Her solo show Being Barbarella was an IdeasTap award winner at the Vault Festival at The Vaults, Waterloo, before Lyons travelled to Australia to perform it at the Adelaide Fringe Festival in 2015. She was a founder of "The Secret Comedians", a collective who run comedy nights in East London and was a regular compere at the Camden Comedy Club in Camden, London. She was a co-director of OddFlock, a London-based theatre company made up of a group of Drama graduates from the University of Bristol. She also directed at Riverside Studios, The Lion & Unicorn Theatre, Etcetera Theatre, and was a General Manager of the Finborough Theatre.

Vogue called Lyons one of the five best new British female comics. In 2017 her show Swan was nominated for Best Show at the Edinburgh Comedy Awards. Stephen Armstrong, in The Times wrote: "It was ludicrous and hilarious." Bruce Dessau, reviewing her 2018 musical show ChiffChaff in The Evening Standard, gave the show four out of five stars. He called Lyons "a compelling physical presence" and judged that "as a loopy, unique mash-up ChiffChaff is bang on the money". Later in 2018 she performed a new show, Medusa. An early 2019 show was called "Love Songs to Guinea Pigs". Unlikely Darlings, a collaboration with Helen Duff exploring the life of painter Leonora Carrington. Unlikely Darlings was selected as one of The Daily Telegraph's Top Cultural Moments of 2020. Brian Logan of The Guardian wrote in 2022 that Lyons “can’t be accused of treading the conventional career path ... None of her shows ever remotely resembles the next.” Her 2026 show The Woman on the Edge reflects the breakup of Lyons' engagement the previous year. Reviewing the Edinburgh Fringe run, Logan said "It’s potent stuff, building to a fierce finale in which she claws back something defiant, celebratory even, from the wreckage of her love life."

She has written for The Guardian on polyamory. and The Scotsman on the importance of play..
