= Jones Bootmaker =

British footwear retailer

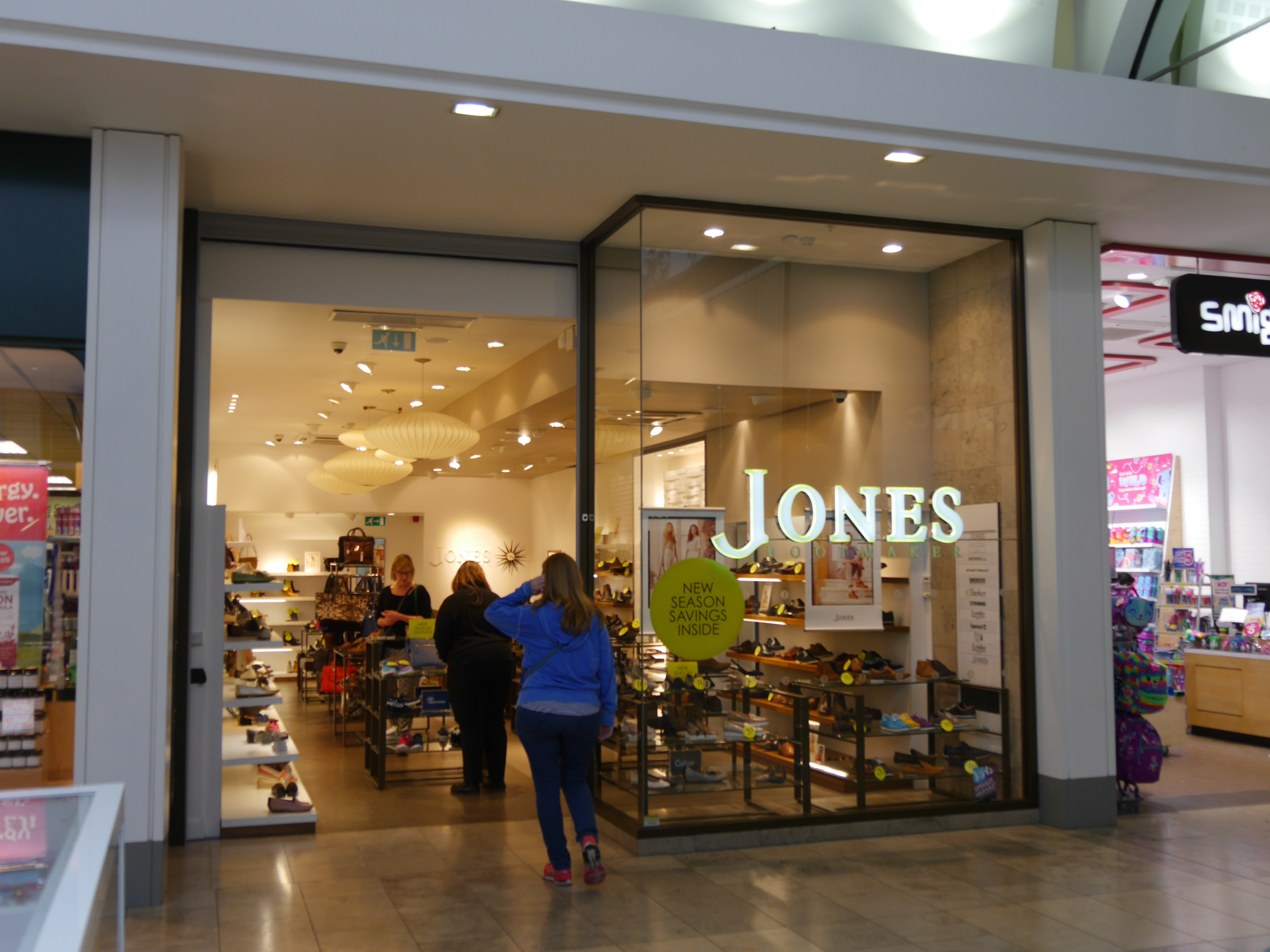
- Jones, Southside Wandsworth, London
- Type: Private
- Genre: Retailer
- Founded: Bayswater, London, England 1857
- Founder: Alfred Jones
- Headquarters: York, North Yorkshire, England
- Number of locations: 42
- Area served: United Kingdom; United States
- Products: Shoes
- Owner: Pavers Shoes
- Website: www.jonesbootmaker.com us.jonesbootmaker.com

Jones Bootmaker is a footwear retailer based in the United Kingdom, with forty-two retail outlets throughout the United Kingdom.

== History ==
In 1857, Alfred and Emma Jones opened a footwear shop in Bayswater, London. Jones was a pioneer in the installation of electric lighting in retail premises. Nine of their eleven sons became apprentices and subsequently store owners, trading as A. Jones and sons. A company innovation was the supply of ready made shoes in three widths.

After the Second World War, the company expanded, with a warehouse in Eastbourne, the modernisation of existing stores, and the opening of new branches. The growth in Jones' retail outlets outstripped production at their factory; in 1955, the company became a member of the group Church's. A 'City Bootmaker' shop was opened in Manchester in 1994, and in 1996, the company began trading as Jones Bootmaker.

After the acquisition of Church's by Prada, Jones Bootmaker was sold to a private investor in 2001, and then in 2006 to a financial consortium. It was sold in 2010 to the Macintosh Retail Group, and again in 2015 to Alteri Investors (part of Apollo Global Management) for £12 million. Alteri filed an intention to appoint administrators for Jones on 15 March 2017, and the company was purchased in a pre pack administration deal by Endless LLP on 26 March 2017, which saved seventy two of the stores. The chain was purchased from Endless by Pavers Shoes in February 2018.
