= James Tom =

American comedian and actor

- Born: 1990 or 1991 (age 35–36); San Francisco, California, U.S.
- Education: Smith College
- Occupations: Comedian, actor, writer
- Family: Edison Uno (grandfather)

James Setsuo Tom (formerly Jes Tom, born 1990/1991) is an American comedian, actor, and writer based in New York City. His work explores themes including sex, gender identity, and Asian American representation.

== Early life and education ==
Tom was born and raised in San Francisco, California. Tom’s grandfather is Japanese-Chinese American activist Edison Uno. He enjoyed acting in high school, and later joined the improvisation team at Smith College.

Tom graduated from Smith in 2013. In 2016, he completed a two-year acting program at the Maggie Flanagan Studio.

== Career ==
In 2011, Tom started performing at open mics in San Francisco. In 2013, he moved to New York City to pursue a career in comedy.

In 2021, Tom was named a New Face of Comedy at the Just for Laughs comedy festival.

In 2022, Tom's solo show, Less Lonely, had its off-Broadway premiere at the Cherry Lane Theatre. The show returned to off-Broadway in 2023 for a limited engagement at the Greenwich House Theater, presented by his friend Elliot Page.

Tom worked as a story editor for the HBO Max series Our Flag Means Death. His other credits include the animated series Tuca & Bertie, the Netflix/Funny or Die short film Soojung Dreams of Fiji, and an Instagram live advice show for Netflix, Dear Jes.

In March 2024, Tom appeared in a Netflix comedy special, Hannah Gadsby's Gender Agenda, hosted by Hannah Gadsby and also featuring fellow genderqueer comedians Alok, Chloe Petts, DeAnne Smith, Krishna Istha, Asha Ward, and Mx. Dahlia Belle.

== Personal life ==
Tom is a fifth-generation Asian American, of Japanese and Chinese descent. He is non-binary and transmasculine, and goes by he/him and they/them pronouns. In March 2025, Tom publicly announced his name change to James Setsuo Tom on Instagram, referencing that he had been going by James for some time. He subsequently published an article in them titled Why I'm Changing My Name to James, where he explores moving on from his "placeholder name" of "Jes Tom" explaining the change as a "demand that other people see what I see".
