= Asha Ward =

American comedian

- Education: Columbia College Chicago
- Occupations: Comedian, writer
- Employer: Saturday Night Live

Asha Ward is a Trinidadian American comedian and writer. In 2022, she became the youngest-ever writer on the staff of Saturday Night Live.

Ward, whose family is from Trinidad, was raised in Maryland. Her parents divorced when she was young.

Ward became interested in performing comedy after taking an improv class at the age of 17. She graduated from Columbia College Chicago in 2021 with a bachelor's degree in comedy writing and performance. As many comedy venues in Chicago had shut down during the COVID-19 pandemic, she left the city soon afterward, staying with relatives in Baltimore and Queens until she could afford to rent a room of her own in Brooklyn.

Ward was working a day job as a receptionist and nights as a stand-up comedian when she got a meeting with Saturday Night Live cast member Ego Nwodim. Ward was hired to write for SNL in December 2022. In 2023, she was nominated for a Primetime Emmy Award for Outstanding Writing for a Variety Series.

In 2023, Ward was featured by the Just For Laughs comedy festival as one of their "New Faces of Comedy".

In March 2024, Ward appeared in a Netflix comedy special, Hannah Gadsby's Gender Agenda, hosted by Hannah Gadsby and also featuring fellow genderqueer comedians James Tom, Alok, Chloe Petts, DeAnne Smith, Krishna Istha, and Mx. Dahlia Belle.
