= Krishna Istha =

Indian comedian

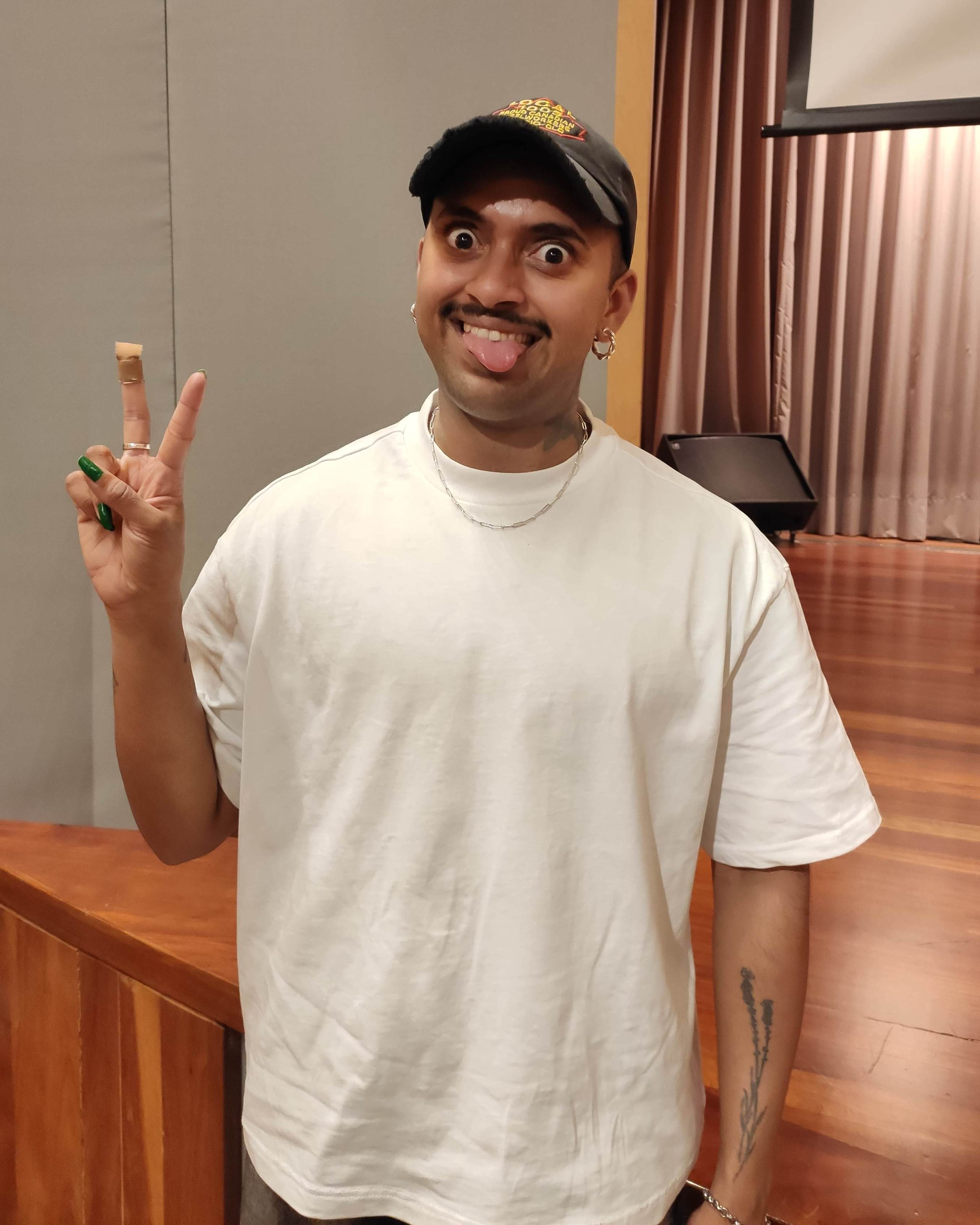
- Born: 1993 or 1994 (age 31–32); Bangalore, Karnataka, India
- Occupations: Comedian, writer, performance artist
- Website: krishnaistha.com

Krishna Istha (born 1993/1994) is a comedian, writer, and performance artist based in London. They have performed across the United Kingdom, Germany, Australia, and the United States of America.

== Early life and influences ==
Istha, who is of Indian descent, is originally from Bangalore. They grew up in Sydney.

Istha first became interested in stand-up comedy after seeing performances by Zoë Coombs Marr and Hannah Gadsby. This experience broadened their perspective on the potential of stand-up comedy and its inclusivity. Growing up, Istha recalls being a "goofy" child, often engaging in performances to make others laugh.

== Career ==
Since 2013, Krishna Istha has been involved in various artistic endeavors across theatre, opera, comedy, and performance art.

Istha’s first solo show, Beast, directed by Zoë Coombs Marr, is a stand-up comedy piece that reflects on their experience being transgender. They've also been part of Fck Fabulous*, a variety show by Yana Alana and have collaborated on a play with Travis Alabanza and Emma Frankland for a company of young trans actors.

In 2017, Istha helped establish the Australian chapter of the Cocoa Butter Club, alongside Dani Boi. The cabaret and performance night showcases and celebrates Indigenous and performers of colour, with events running quarterly at the Melba Spiegeltent in Melbourne. The Cocoa Butter Club Australia also staged a sold-out show at Arts Centre Melbourne as part of the Midsumma Festival in 2018.

In 2020, Istha was awarded a bursary from Artsadmin to support their artistic work.

Istha wrote for season 4 of the Netflix series Sex Education, which was released in 2023.

In 2023, Istha won a grant from Arts Council England to produce their show, First Trimester, which was performed at Battersea Arts Centre. This performance explored their journey to start a family as a transmasculine person with their partner. The show featured intimate live interviews between Istha and participants in search of a suitable sperm donor, focusing on qualities beyond genetics. The performance was also the subject of the documentary short film Sperm Donors Wanted!, directed by Logan Rea, with the help of a Netflix Documentary Talent Fund.

In March 2024, Istha appeared in a Netflix comedy special, Hannah Gadsby's Gender Agenda, hosted by Hannah Gadsby and also featuring fellow genderqueer comedians Alok, Chloe Petts, DeAnne Smith, James Tom, Asha Ward, and Mx. Dahlia Belle.

== Personal life ==
Istha is non-binary and transmasculine, and goes by they/them pronouns.
