= Chloe Petts =

English comedian (born 1993 or 1994)

- Born: 1993 or 1994 (age 32–33); Sittingbourne, Kent, England
- Education: University College London
- Occupation: Comedian
- Years active: 2014–present
- Website: chloepetts.org

Chloe Petts (born 1993 or 1994) is an English comedian. Their act includes discussion of transphobia from their perspective as "a six-foot lesbian from Kent who is often mistaken for a man".

== Early life and education ==
Petts was born and raised in Sittingbourne, Kent. They have a brother. Petts played football as a goalkeeper for a football academy until they were sixteen and were elected head girl at their school. They moved to London to attend UCL, where they joined a drama society and developed an interest in comedy. Petts started doing stand-up when they were twenty-one. Before they did comedy, they were in a Christian rock band.

== Career ==
In 2016, Chloe Petts co-founded the LOL Word, a collective of queer and non-binary comedians. In 2022, they supported fellow comedian Ed Gamble on his tour of the UK. That same year, they had their debut performance at the Edinburgh Fringe with their first full-length show, Transience. Petts' performances with the LOL Word and their solo act were well received by critics.

In 2023, Petts returned to the Edinburgh Fringe with their new show, If You Can’t Say Anything Nice. This was followed in 2024 with a third show, How You See Me, How You Don't, which Petts also took up to the Fringe and toured around the United Kingdom. In 2025, Big Naturals became their fourth show at the Edinburgh Fringe, with another UK tour following in early 2026, and for the first time they performed headline shows in Northern Ireland and the Republic of Ireland.

Petts has appeared on TV shows including Hypothetical, Jonathan Ross's Comedy Club, The Stand-Up Sketch Show, Pointless Celebrities, Richard Osman's House of Games, Have I Got News For You, and Celebrity Mastermind.

In March 2024, Petts appeared in a Netflix comedy special, Hannah Gadsby's Gender Agenda, hosted by Hannah Gadsby and also featuring fellow genderqueer comedians Alok, Krishna Istha, DeAnne Smith, James Tom, Asha Ward, and Mx. Dahlia Belle.

In 2025 on YouTube, Petts hosted the webseries 'Comedians Taking Penalties', with guests including Nish Kumar, Mathew Baynton, and Sophie Duker.

In 2026, Petts was in the U&Dave escape room-style comedy series The Way Out, and became a contestant on the 22nd series of Taskmaster. They were declared the winner of Taskmaster in November 2026.

In September 2026, Petts announced a new stand-up tour, Call Me By My Surname, which is scheduled to be performed across the UK and Ireland from January to May 2027.

== Personal life ==
Petts has described themself as "a radical feminist and queer", and has described their gender identity as "non-conforming" and "fluid". They use they/them pronouns. An avid football fan, Petts holds season tickets for Crystal Palace.
