= Mx. Dahlia Belle =

American comedian and writer

- Born: 1980 or 1981 (age 44–45); Orlando, Florida, U.S.
- Occupations: Comedian, writer
- Children: 1
- Website: mxdahliabelle.com

Mx. Dahlia Belle (born 1980/1981) is an American comedian and writer based in Portland, Oregon.

Belle was born in Orlando, Florida, and spent part of her youth in the Midwest. She performed as a musician for over ten years before shifting to stand-up comedy.

Belle moved to Portland in 2003. She helps produce the Portland Queer Comedy Festival.

In addition to performing comedy, Belle has written for various publications, including Cosmopolitan and Portland Mercury. In 2021, she gained attention for publishing an open letter to comedian Dave Chappelle in The Guardian. She was among a number of comedians who criticized his Netflix special The Closer for including jokes they considered to be transphobic.

In March 2024, Belle appeared in the Netflix comedy special, Hannah Gadsby's Gender Agenda, hosted by Hannah Gadsby and also featuring fellow genderqueer comedians James Tom, Alok, Chloe Petts, DeAnne Smith, Krishna Istha, and Asha Ward.
