= Hannah Gadsby: Douglas =

Comedy show by Hannah Gadsby, launched 2019

Douglas
- Film poster
- Directed by: Madeleine Parry
- Written by: Hannah Gadsby
- Starring: Hannah Gadsby
- Distributed by: Netflix
- Release date: May 26, 2020
- Running time: 72 minutes
- Country: Australia
- Language: English

Hannah Gadsby: Douglas is a live comedy performance written and performed by Australian comedian Hannah Gadsby, which debuted in 2019. The show follows on the success of their previous show Nanette, which helped Gadsby expand their international audience. The show toured internationally, and a video of their Los Angeles performance of this show was released as a Netflix comedy special in May 2020.

== Performances ==
Gadsby performed Douglas globally, opening at the Arts Centre Melbourne in Melbourne, Australia. In their first US tour, they performed in over 10 states as well as at a five-week stint at the Daryl Roth Theatre in New York City.

The show toured internationally in the UK, US, Canada, the Netherlands and across Europe.

On May 26, 2020, Netflix released a film of Gadsby performing the show at the Ace Hotel Theatre in Los Angeles. Gadsby cut a portion of the live show from the Netflix release that discussed a slur that a former girlfriend insulted them with.

== Content ==
The show begins with Gadsby outlining the chronology of the show in a move they say is to manage expectations. It begins with mundane observational humor, including mocking American culture. The main thrust of the show continues on topics first highlighted in their previous show Nanette such as their experiences with misogyny and as a lesbian woman and their autism diagnosis often through the lens of historical art.

"Douglas" is the name of Gadsby's dog. They explain to a stranger at a dog park that the pouch of Douglas is the space between the rectum and vagina of a woman. Gadsby expresses surprise that a male physician (James Douglas) made this discovery. They joke that men have hormones, and "sometimes you get testy" (a pun on "testy" meaning "irritable" and the hormone testosterone produced by the testes).

Gadsby riffs on the naming of the Teenage Mutant Ninja Turtles, who are all named after Italian Renaissance artists, Leonardo (da Vinci), Raphael and Michelangelo. The fourth Ninja Turtle is named after Donatello, while Gadsby argues that it would have made more sense to choose Titian, but the "target demographic of that television show could not handle a name that begins with 'tit' because of their fucking hormones."

== Reception ==
On review aggregator Rotten Tomatoes, the film has an approval rating of 93% based on 27 reviews with an average rating of 7.5/10. The website's critics consensus reads: "Humorously human and poignantly hilarious, Douglas is an expertly constructed hour of comedy that further affirms Hannah Gadsby's mastery of her craft." On Metacritic it has a score of 75% based on reviews from 8 critics, indicating "generally favorable reviews".

Inkoo Kang of The Hollywood Reporter wrote: "If Nanette demonstrated Gadsby's mastery of tone and command of the audience, Douglas is an even richer showcase for the comic's technical prowess." Entertainment Weekly's Leah Greenblatt called it "a natural extension of Nanette and a gentle buffering of it." Brian Logan of The Guardian in commented that "it’s a well-constructed set, with a high hit-rate of jokes". New York Times' Jason Zinoman in his review of the film called it a "surprisingly slick, joke-dense show" and ambitious like their previous special, while also saying that the show's "cleverness gets in its own way". Brian Lowry of CNN contrasted it with their previous work Nanette saying "While there are some very funny bits, clever observations and yes, personal information strewn along the way, perhaps inevitably nothing lands with quite the raw intensity of her debut."

== Accolades ==
Year	Award	Category	Recipient(s)	Result	Ref.
2020	Primetime Emmy Awards	Outstanding Variety Special (Pre-Recorded)	Hannah Gadsby, Kevin Whyte, Kathleen McCarthy, John Irwin, Casey Spira and Jenney Shamash	Nominated	
2020	Primetime Emmy Awards	Outstanding Writing for a Variety Special	Hannah Gadsby	Nominated	
2021	Critics' Choice Television Awards	Best Comedy Special	Hannah Gadsby: Douglas	Nominated	
