= Barry Award =

Barry Award is the name of several different awards:

- Melbourne International Comedy Festival Award, an Australian award for comedy formerly known as the Barry Award
- Barry Award (crime novel prize), an American award
