= Perth International Comedy Festival =

The Perth International Comedy Festival is an Australian not-for-profit festival.

== History ==
The PICF organizing committee was created in mid-2011 and went on to launch an inaugural festival in May 2012. This festival was 19 days in length and was held in the Mount Lawley area of Perth, Western Australia, across four different venues. 150 performances of an international, national and local calibre were presented to an audience of more than 26,000. 51 of the performances were sold out, and 82% of the total audience capacity was reached. Acts included Henry Rollins, Stephen K Amos, Steve Hughes, The Pajama Men, Des Bishop, Daniel Kitson, Neil Hamburger, Peter Powers, Glenn Wool, DeAnne Smith, Tripod, Sammy J & Randy, Fiona O'Loughlin, Charlie Pickering, Tom Gleeson, Greg Fleet, Dave Callan, Brendon Burns, Felicity Ward, Lawrence Mooney, Asher Treleaven, Hannah Gadsby and Joel Creasey. The Festival Director and curator was Jo Marsh.

In 2013 the festival was once more held in May, similarly for 19 days. Comedians included Diggy Bones, Daniel Sloss, Paul Foot and Gina Yashere.

The festival includes an Opening Gala with short performances from selected comedians. There is also musical entertainment.
