= Morgan Spurlock's New Britannia =

- Genre: Satire; Talk show
- Written by: Morgan Spurlock; Jeremy Chilnick; Dave Hanson; Marc Haynes; Warren Prentice; Brad Aldous
- Directed by: Gary Brooks
- Presented by: Morgan Spurlock
- Country of origin: United Kingdom
- Original language: English
- No. of series: 1
- No. of episodes: 10

Production
- Running time: 60 mins (inc. adverts)
- Production companies: Thumbs Up Productions; Warrior Poets

Original release
- Network: Sky Atlantic
- Release: 2 April – 4 June 2012

Morgan Spurlock's New Britannia is a British satirical entertainment series and talk show hosted by American documentary maker and television presenter Morgan Spurlock. The series takes a comedic look at the differences between British and American culture, focusing on a number of key areas including food, sport, class and fame. Each episode he is joined by a selection of guests from both sides of the Atlantic who offer their input on the subject.

The series debuted on Sky Atlantic and Sky Atlantic HD on 2 April 2012, after Game of Thrones. The first series ran for 10 episodes.

== Episodes ==
=== Series 1 (2012) ===
Date	Episode number	Subject	Guests	Musical guest	Ratings
2 April 2012	1	Foreigners	Shappi Khorsandi, Andrew Maxwell, Ruby Wax	Jack Savoretti	129,000 viewers
9 April 2012	2	Food	Dave Gorman, Jamie Oliver, DeAnne Smith, Barry Rigby, Crazy Legs Conti	Lisa Hannigan	103,000 viewers
16 April 2012	3	Love	Kurt Braunohler, Andi Osho and Johnny Vegas	The Midnight Beast	TBA
23 April 2012	4	Class	Scott Capurro, Lady Victoria Hervey, Russell Kane	Band of Skulls	TBA
30 April 2012	5	Law and order	Dave Fulton, Howard Marks, Debra Stephenson	Tribes	TBA
7 May 2012	6	Sport	Keith Allen, Joe Calzaghe, Chris Ramsey	Various Cruelties	TBA
14 May 2012	7	Fame	Katy Brand, Corey Feldman, Peter Serafinowicz and The Enemy	Frank Turner	TBA
21 May 2012	8	Fun	Doug Benson, Sara Cox, Jon Richardson	Friends	TBA
28 May 2012	9	Power	Clive Anderson, Roisin Conaty, Rich Hall	Spector	TBA
4 June 2012	10	Awards	Des Bishop, Margaret Cho, Rhys Darby	King Charles	TBA

== Reception ==
The show was met with poor reviews.
