= List of Taskmaster episodes =

British panel show episodes

Taskmaster is a British comedy panel game show created by comedian Alex Horne and presented by both Horne and Greg Davies. In the programme, a group of five celebrities—mainly comedians—attempt to complete a series of challenges, with Horne acting as umpire in each challenge, and Davies judging the work and awarding points based on contestants' performances. The concept for the programme was first created by Horne for the Edinburgh Festival Fringe in 2010; he later secured a deal with Dave to adapt it for television, with the first episode premiering in 2015. After the ninth series in 2019, the programme was acquired by Channel 4. In 2026, after production of series 21, Channel 4 renewed the show for six more series to be broadcast until 2029, alongside further Champion of Champions and New Year Treat specials.

The twenty-second series, featuring Chloe Petts, Isy Suttie, Matt Lucas, Nina Conti, and Richard Ayoade, aired from September to November 2026.

== Series overview ==
Series	Episodes	Originally released		
Series	Episodes	First released	Last released	Network
1	6	28 July 2015	1 September 2015	Dave
2	5	21 June 2016	19 July 2016	Dave
3	5	4 October 2016	1 November 2016	Dave
4	8	25 April 2017	13 June 2017	Dave
5	8	13 September 2017	1 November 2017	Dave
CoC	2	13 December 2017	20 December 2017	Dave
6	10	2 May 2018	4 July 2018	Dave
7	10	5 September 2018	7 November 2018	Dave
8	10	8 May 2019	10 July 2019	Dave
9	10	4 September 2019	6 November 2019	Dave
10	10	15 October 2020	17 December 2020	Channel 4
NYT	1	1 January 2021		Channel 4
11	10	18 March 2021	20 May 2021	Channel 4
12	10	23 September 2021	25 November 2021	Channel 4
NYT II	1	1 January 2022		Channel 4
13	10	14 April 2022	16 June 2022	Channel 4
CoC II	1	23 June 2022		Channel 4
14	10	29 September 2022	1 December 2022	Channel 4
NYT III	1	1 January 2023		Channel 4
15	10	30 March 2023	1 June 2023	Channel 4
16	10	21 September 2023	23 November 2023	Channel 4
NYT IV	1	2 January 2024		Channel 4
CoC III	1	14 January 2024		Channel 4
17	10	28 March 2024	30 May 2024	Channel 4
18	10	12 September 2024	14 November 2024	Channel 4
NYT V	1	29 December 2024		Channel 4
19	10	1 May 2025	3 July 2025	Channel 4
20	10	11 September 2025	13 November 2025	Channel 4
CoC IV	1	22 December 2025		Channel 4
NYT VI	2	2 January 2026	3 January 2026	Channel 4
21	10	9 April 2026	11 June 2026	Channel 4
22	10	3 September 2026	5 November 2026	Channel 4

== Main series ==
=== Series 1 (2015) ===
The first series was aired during 2015 on Dave for six episodes, between 28 July to 1 September. The contestants for this series were Frank Skinner, Josh Widdicombe, Roisin Conaty, Romesh Ranganathan and Tim Key, with the series' overall winner being Widdicombe – both Skinner and Ranganathan tied as runner-ups, Key placed fourth, and Conaty finished in last place. During its broadcast, the series averaged over 420,000 viewers. Following his participation, Key later went on to provide assistance with production of the programme in future series.

For the team tasks, the team of three consisted of Widdicombe, Conaty and Ranganathan, while the team of two consisted of Skinner and Key.

No. overall	No. in series	Title	Winner	Original release date	UK Viewers
1	1	"Melon Buffet"	Frank Skinner	28 July 2015	446,000
2	2	"The Pie Whisperer"	Roisin Conaty	4 August 2015	381,000
3	3	"The Poet and the Egg"	Josh Widdicombe	11 August 2015	305,000
4	4	"Down an Octave"	Josh Widdicombe	18 August 2015	406,000 (Note: 7-day data, as 28-day data is not available.)
5	5	"Little Denim Shorts"	Frank Skinner	25 August 2015	495,000
6	6	"The Last Supper"	Tim Key	1 September 2015	505,000

=== Series 2 (2016) ===
The second series was broadcast during 2016 for five episodes, between 21 June to 19 July. This series started the tradition of awarding a golden trophy of Greg Davies' head, unlike the previous season's prize, won by Josh Widdicombe, which had been a generic sports trophy. The contestants for this series were Doc Brown, Joe Wilkinson, Jon Richardson, Katherine Ryan and Richard Osman, with the series' overall winner being Ryan – Richardson ended as the runner-up, Osman placed 3rd, Brown placed 4th, and Wilkinson finished last. During its broadcast, the series averaged over 710,000 viewers.

For the team tasks, the team of three consisted of Ryan, Brown and Wilkinson, while the team of two consisted of Osman and Richardson.

Danish comedian Sofie Hagen made a voice appearance after Ryan called her during a task attempt in episode 1. Previous contestant Josh Widdicombe appeared in episode 3 to aid Osman and Richardson in a team task.

No. overall	No. in series	Title	Winner	Original release date	UK Viewers
7	1	"Fear of Failure"	Richard Osman	21 June 2016	652,000
8	2	"Pork Is a Sausage"	Jon Richardson	28 June 2016	752,000
9	3	"A Pistachio Éclair"	Katherine Ryan	5 July 2016	764,000
10	4	"Welcome to Rico Face"	Doc Brown	12 July 2016	737,000
11	5	"There's Strength in Arches"	Richard Osman	19 July 2016	666,000

=== Series 3 (2016) ===
The third series was broadcast during 2016 for five episodes, between 4 October to 1 November; it was initially planned for 2017, but was aired earlier due to improved viewing figures for the programme after the second series. The contestants for this series were Al Murray, Dave Gorman, Paul Chowdhry, Rob Beckett and Sara Pascoe, with the series' overall winner being Beckett – Gorman ended as the runner-up, Murray placed 3rd, Pascoe placed 4th, and Chowdhry finished last. During its broadcast, the series averaged over 930,000 viewers.

For the team tasks, the team of three consisted of Murray, Gorman and Chowdhry, while the team of two consisted of Beckett and Pascoe.

Broadcaster and writer Ben Fogle made a cameo appearance in episode 5 due to coincidentally being in the same location during filming of a task.

No. overall	No. in series	Title	Winner	Original release date	UK Viewers
12	1	"A Pea in a Haystack"	Al Murray	4 October 2016	838,000
13	2	"The Dong and the Gong"	Rob Beckett	11 October 2016	849,000
14	3	"Little Polythene Grief Cave"	Paul Chowdhry	18 October 2016	949,000
15	4	"A Very Nuanced Character"	Dave Gorman	25 October 2016	1,002,000
16	5	"The F.I.P."	Rob Beckett	1 November 2016	1,023,000

=== Series 4 (2017) ===
The fourth series was broadcast during 2017 for eight episodes, between 25 April to 13 June. The contestants for this series were Hugh Dennis, Joe Lycett, Lolly Adefope, Mel Giedroyc and Noel Fielding, with the series' overall winner being Fielding – Lycett ended as the runner-up, Giedroyc placed 3rd, Dennis placed 4th, and Adefope finished last. During its broadcast, the series averaged over 800,000 viewers.

For team tasks, the team of three was made up of Lycett, Adefope and Fielding, with the team of two consisting of Dennis and Giedroyc.

Former series 3 contestant Al Murray made a cameo in episode 3, and former series 1 contestant Tim Key made a cameo in episode 8.

No. overall	No. in series	Title	Winner	Original release date	UK Viewers
17	1	"A Fat Bald White Man"	Noel Fielding	25 April 2017	787,000
18	2	"Look at Me"	Mel Giedroyc	2 May 2017	777,000
19	3	"Hollowing Out a Baguette"	Joe Lycett	9 May 2017	752,000
20	4	"Friendship Is Truth"	Mel Giedroyc	16 May 2017	835,000
21	5	"Meat"	Hugh Dennis	23 May 2017	837,000
22	6	"Spatchcock It"	Lolly Adefope	30 May 2017	860,000
23	7	"No Stars for Naughty Boys"	Joe Lycett	6 June 2017	794,000
24	8	"Tony Three Pies"	Mel Giedroyc	13 June 2017	759,000

=== Series 5 (2017) ===
The fifth series was broadcast during 2017 for eight episodes, between 13 September to 1 November. The contestants for this series were Aisling Bea, Bob Mortimer, Mark Watson, Nish Kumar and Sally Phillips, with the series' overall winner being Mortimer – both Watson and Phillips tied as the runner-up, Bea placed 4th, and Kumar finished last. During its broadcast, the series averaged over 700,000 viewers.

For team tasks, the team of three was made up of Bea, Mortimer and Phillips, with the team of two consisting of Watson and Kumar.

Former contestant Dave Gorman appeared as part of Bea's attempt at a prize task in episode 2.

Remote filming took place at Frensham Great Pond, in Surrey.

No. overall	No. in series	Title	Winner	Original release date	UK Viewers
25	1	"Dignity Intact"	Bob Mortimer	13 September 2017	799,000
26	2	"The Leprechaun or the Lesbian"	Sally Phillips	20 September 2017	746,000
27	3	"Phoenix"	Bob Mortimer	27 September 2017	682,000
28	4	"Residue Round the Hoof"	Mark Watson	4 October 2017	656,000
29	5	"A Wind-Dried Puffin"	Mark Watson	11 October 2017	664,000
30	6	"Spoony Neeson"	Sally Phillips	18 October 2017	663,000
31	7	"Boing Boing"	Bob Mortimer	25 October 2017	627,000
32	8	"Their Water's So Delicious"	Sally Phillips	1 November 2017	821,000

=== Champion of Champions (2017) ===
In September 2017, a two-part special titled "Champion of Champions" was announced. The first five winners – Bob Mortimer, Josh Widdicombe, Katherine Ryan, Noel Fielding and Rob Beckett – were set a series of new tasks, with the winner receiving a life-size trophy based on Davies' headless body – designed to attach the winner's trophy from their series on the neck. The special, which featured no team tasks, was aired later that year: the first part on 13 December; and the second part a week later, on 20 December.

The special's overall winner was Widdicombe – Beckett ended as the runner-up, Ryan placed 3rd, Fielding placed 4th, and Mortimer finished last. During its broadcast, the special averaged over 800,000 viewers.

No. overall	No. in series	Title	Winner	Original release date	UK Viewers
33	1	"Wiley Giraffe Blower"	Katherine Ryan	13 December 2017	798,000
34	2	"I've Sinned Again"	Josh Widdicombe	20 December 2017	807,000

=== Series 6 (2018) ===
The sixth series was broadcast during 2018 for ten episodes, between 2 May to 4 July. The contestants for this series were Alice Levine, Asim Chaudhry, Liza Tarbuck, Russell Howard and Tim Vine, with the series' overall winner being Tarbuck – Vine ended as the runner-up, Howard placed 3rd, Chaudhry placed 4th, and Levine finished last. During its broadcast, the series averaged over 900,000 viewers.

For team tasks, the team of three consisted of Chaudhry, Tarbuck and Vine, while the team of two was made up of Levine and Howard.

No. overall	No. in series	Title	Winner	Original release date	UK Viewers
35	1	"The Old Soft Curved Padlock"	Alice Levine	2 May 2018	1,214,000
36	2	"Tarpeters"	Liza Tarbuck	9 May 2018	886,000
37	3	"One Warm Prawn"	Liza Tarbuck	16 May 2018	942,000
38	4	"BMXing!"	Russell Howard	23 May 2018	830,000
39	5	"H"	Tim Vine	30 May 2018	749,000
40	6	"We Met at Mealtimes"	Tim Vine	6 June 2018	730,000
41	7	"Roadkill Doused in Syrup"	Russell Howard	13 June 2018	N/A (Note: BARB's website does not report Dave's viewing figures for this week.)
42	8	"What Kind of Pictures?"	Russell Howard	20 June 2018	795,000
43	9	"The Bubble Brothers"	Alice Levine	27 June 2018	875,000
44	10	"He Was a Different Man"	Asim Chaudhry	4 July 2018	1,090,000

=== Series 7 (2018) ===
The seventh series was broadcast during 2018 for ten episodes, between 5 September to 7 November. The contestants for this series were James Acaster, Jessica Knappett, Kerry Godliman, Phil Wang and Rhod Gilbert, with the series' overall winner being Godliman – Knappett ended as the runner-up, Gilbert placed 3rd, Acaster placed 4th, and Wang finished last. During its broadcast, the series averaged over 1.2 million viewers.

For team tasks, the team of three was made up of Acaster, Wang and Gilbert, with the team of two consisting of Knappett and Godliman.

Previous contestant Richard Osman appeared in episode 5 as part of Acaster's attempt at a task.

No. overall	No. in series	Title	Winner	Original air date (Note: Each episode aired one week earlier on the online service UKTV, with the exception of the finale.)	UK Viewers (Note: Viewers across the first 28 days of broadcast on TV, PC/laptop, tablet or smartphone are counted. Pre-transmission figures are included.)
45	1	"The Mean Bean"	Kerry Godliman	5 September 2018	1,295,000
46	2	"My Eyes Are Circles"	Kerry Godliman	12 September 2018	1,404,000
47	3	"Twelve Blush Majesty Two"	James Acaster	19 September 2018	1,197,000
48	4	"OLLIE"	Rhod Gilbert	26 September 2018	1,007,000
49	5	"Lotta Soup"	Jessica Knappett	3 October 2018	1,341,000
50	6	"A Coquettish Fascinator"	James Acaster	10 October 2018	1,132,000
51	7	"The Perfect Stuff"	Rhod Gilbert	17 October 2018	1,292,000
52	8	"Mother Honks Her Horn"	Rhod Gilbert	24 October 2018	1,265,000
53	9	"The Pendulum Draws The Eye"	Kerry Godliman	31 October 2018	839,000
54	10	"I Can Hear It Gooping"	James Acaster	7 November 2018	1,268,000

=== Series 8 (2019) ===
The eighth series was broadcast during 2019 for ten episodes, between 8 May to 10 July. The contestants for this series were Iain Stirling, Joe Thomas, Lou Sanders, Paul Sinha and Sian Gibson, with the series' overall winner being Sanders – Stirling ended as the runner-up, Thomas placed 3rd, Gibson placed 4th, and Sinha finished last. During its broadcast, the series averaged over 1.36 million viewers, the highest viewed series of the programme during its time on Dave.

For team tasks, the team of three was made up of Stirling, Sanders and Sinha, with the team of two consisting of Thomas and Gibson.

Previous contestant Romesh Ranganathan appeared as part of Thomas and Gibson's attempt at a task in episode 5.

No. overall	No. in series	Title	Winner	Original air date	UK Viewers
55	1	"Hello"	Iain Stirling	8 May 2019	1,249,000
56	2	"A Novel About Russian Gulags"	Lou Sanders	15 May 2019	1,495,000
57	3	"Stuck in a Mammal Groove"	Lou Sanders	22 May 2019	1,457,000
58	4	"The Barrel Dad"	Sian Gibson	29 May 2019	1,415,000
59	5	"Stay Humble"	Iain Stirling	5 June 2019	1,366,000
60	6	"Rock 'n' Roll Umlaut"	Sian Gibson	12 June 2019	1,387,000
61	7	"This Is Trevor"	Joe Thomas	19 June 2019	1,278,000
62	8	"Aquatic Sewing Machine"	Paul Sinha	26 June 2019	1,324,000
63	9	"I've Been a Bit Ill"	Lou Sanders	3 July 2019	1,298,000
64	10	"Clumpy Swayey Clumsy Man"	Iain Stirling	10 July 2019	1,309,000

=== Series 9 (2019) ===
The ninth series was broadcast during 2019 for ten episodes, between 4 September to 6 November, and was the last series to be aired on Dave, before its move to Channel 4 the following year. The contestants for this series were David Baddiel, Ed Gamble, Jo Brand, Katy Wix and Rose Matafeo; due to illness, Wix was unable to attend filming of the studio segments for the fifth and sixth episodes, leading to former contestants (and series champions) Kerry Godliman and Katherine Ryan each standing in for these periods respectively. The series' overall winner was Gamble – Matafeo ended as the runner-up, Wix placed 3rd, Brand placed 4th, and Baddiel finished last. During its broadcast, the series averaged over 1.33 million viewers.

For team tasks, the team of three was made up of Gamble, Wix and Matafeo, with the team of two consisting of Baddiel and Brand, although this changed for the live task in the ninth episode, with Baddiel and Gamble paired up.

No. overall	No. in series	Title	Winner	Original air date	UK Viewers
65	1	"Join Our Cult"	Rose Matafeo	4 September 2019	1,485,000
66	2	"Butter in the Microwave"	Ed Gamble	11 September 2019	1,433,000
67	3	"Five Miles Per Day"	Katy Wix	18 September 2019	1,413,000
68	4	"Quisps"	Rose Matafeo	25 September 2019	1,287,000
69	5	"Another Spoon"	Jo Brand	2 October 2019	1,277,000
70	6	"Bready Bready Bready"	Ed Gamble	9 October 2019	1,215,000
71	7	"A Cuddle"	Katy Wix	16 October 2019	1,151,000
72	8	"Shaqinahat"	Ed Gamble	23 October 2019	1,343,000
73	9	"Don't Like Them Go Bang"	David Baddiel	30 October 2019	1,364,000
74	10	"Think About the Spirit"	Ed Gamble	6 November 2019	1,378,000

=== Series 10 (2020) ===
The tenth series consisted of ten episodes and was the first series to be broadcast on Channel 4, broadcast between 15 October and 17 December 2020. Production on the series was affected by the outbreak of the COVID-19 pandemic and was therefore the first to be filmed without a studio audience. The majority of the tasks had been filmed prior to UK going into lockdown, but some team tasks were modified to follow social distancing. The panellists were Daisy May Cooper, Johnny Vegas, Katherine Parkinson, Mawaan Rizwan and Richard Herring.

For most team tasks, the team of three was made up of Vegas, Parkinson and Rizwan and the team of two was made up of Cooper and Herring, although these teams changed for the live task in the eighth episode.

Herring was the overall winner, with Cooper as runner-up, Rizwan in 3rd, Vegas in 4th and Parkinson finishing last.

During its broadcast, the series averaged over 2.83 million viewers, an improvement on previous figures as a result of its move to a channel with a broader audience.

No. overall	No. in series	Title	Winner	Original air date	UK Viewers
75	1	"God's Haemorrhoid"	Richard Herring	15 October 2020	3,362,000
76	2	"A Documentary About a Despot"	Katherine Parkinson	22 October 2020	3,048,000
77	3	"Point of Swivel"	Daisy May Cooper	29 October 2020	2,930,000
78	4	"Toshwash"	Daisy May Cooper	5 November 2020	2,769,000
79	5	"I Hate Your Trainers"	Richard Herring	12 November 2020	2,891,000
80	6	"Hippopotamus"	Mawaan Rizwan	19 November 2020	2,602,000
81	7	"Legit Glass"	Johnny Vegas	26 November 2020	2,578,000
82	8	"Moments of Silence"	Richard Herring	3 December 2020	2,674,000
83	9	"Air Horn Andy"	Richard Herring	10 December 2020	2,811,000
84	10	"Dog Meat Trifle"	Richard Herring	17 December 2020	2,662,000

=== New Year Treat (2021) ===
A one-off festive special of Taskmaster was announced following the tenth series, and aired on 1 January 2021 under the title Taskmaster's New Year Treat. The special consisted of one episode and there were no team tasks. The special's contestants were John Hannah, Krishnan Guru-Murthy, Nicola Coughlan, Rylan Clark and Shirley Ballas.

Ballas was the overall winner, with Clark as runner-up, Guru-Murthy in 3rd, and Coughlan and Hannah tied last.

No. overall	No. in series	Title	Winner	Original air date	UK Viewers
85	1	"The Fastest Duck"	Shirley Ballas	1 January 2021	3,336,000

=== Series 11 (2021) ===
The eleventh series was broadcast during 2021 with the usual ten-episode format, from 18 March to 20 May, and the contestants for that series were Charlotte Ritchie, Jamali Maddix, Lee Mack, Mike Wozniak and Sarah Kendall.

For team tasks in this series, the team of three was made up of Ritchie, Maddix and Kendall and the team of two was made up of Mack and Wozniak.

Kendall was the overall winner, with Wozniak as runner-up, Mack in 3rd, Maddix in 4th, and Ritchie finishing last.

As Britain was still dealing with the COVID-19 pandemic and maintaining strict social distancing guidelines, filming was done in compliance with these, with virtual audiences allowed to watch complete footage and their laughter tracks recorded for the final edit of an episode before it is broadcast.

During its broadcast, the series averaged over 2.71 million viewers.

No. overall	No. in series	Title	Winner	Original air date	UK Viewers
86	1	"It's Not Your Fault"	Sarah Kendall	18 March 2021	3,438,000
87	2	"The Lure of the Treacle Puppies"	Mike Wozniak	25 March 2021	2,974,000
88	3	"Run Up a Tree to the Moon"	Sarah Kendall	1 April 2021	2,952,000
89	4	"Premature Conker"	Sarah Kendall	8 April 2021	2,751,000
90	5	"Slap and Tong"	Charlotte Ritchie	15 April 2021	2,522,000
91	6	"Absolute Casserole"	Jamali Maddix	22 April 2021	2,619,000
92	7	"You've Got No Chutzpah"	Lee Mack	29 April 2021	2,489,000
93	8	"An Orderly Species"	Lee Mack	6 May 2021	2,335,000
94	9	"Mr Octopus and Pottyhands"	Charlotte Ritchie	13 May 2021	2,542,000
95	10	"Activate Jamali"	Lee Mack	20 May 2021	2,518,000

=== Series 12 (2021) ===
The contestants for the twelfth season were announced on 20 May 2021. The line-up includes Alan Davies, Desiree Burch, Guz Khan, Morgana Robinson and Victoria Coren Mitchell. It began airing from 23 September 2021.

Robinson was the overall winner, with Khan as runner-up, Burch and Davies tied in 3rd, and Coren Mitchell finishing last.

For team tasks in this series, the team of three was made up of Burch, Khan and Robinson and the team of two was made up of Davies and Coren Mitchell.

This series was filmed without a live studio audience.

During its broadcast, the series averaged over 2.56 million viewers.

No. overall	No. in series	Title	Winner	Original air date	UK Viewers
96	1	"An Imbalance in the Poppability"	Morgana Robinson	23 September 2021	2,946,000
97	2	"Oatmeal and Death"	Guz Khan	30 September 2021	2,359,000
98	3	"The End of the Franchise"	Desiree Burch	7 October 2021	2,561,000
99	4	"The Customised Inhaler"	Alan Davies	14 October 2021	2,556,000
100	5	"Croissants Is Croissants"	Guz Khan	21 October 2021	2,730,000
101	6	"A Chair in a Sweet"	Guz Khan	28 October 2021	2,619,000
102	7	"The Integrity of the Product"	Victoria Coren Mitchell	4 November 2021	2,603,000
103	8	"A Couple of Ethels"	Alan Davies	11 November 2021	2,503,000
104	9	"Nothing Matters"	Desiree Burch	18 November 2021	2,401,000
105	10	"Caring Uncle Minpict"	Guz Khan	25 November 2021	2,349,000

=== New Year Treat II (2022) ===
On 3 December 2021, Avalon announced that Taskmaster would have a second "New Year Treat" special, featuring Adrian Chiles, Claudia Winkleman, Jonnie Peacock, Lady Leshurr and Sayeeda Warsi. Due to illness, Peacock could not attend the studio recording, so series 12 contestant Alan Davies was present in his place. The special was the first since Series 9 to include a studio audience and not have the contestants or hosts socially distanced.

Chiles was the overall winner, with Peacock as runner-up, Warsi in 3rd, Leshurr in 4th, and Winkleman finishing last.

No. overall	No. in series	Title	Winner	Original air date	UK Viewers
106	1	"Basic Recipe 28"	Adrian Chiles	1 January 2022	2,264,000

=== Series 13 (2022) ===
Following the final of series 12 on 25 November 2021, the cast for the show's thirteenth series was announced, set to begin on 14 April 2022. Series 13 features Ardal O'Hanlon, Bridget Christie, Chris Ramsey, Judi Love and Sophie Duker.

For team tasks in this series, the team of three was made up of Christie, Love and Duker and the team of two was made up of O'Hanlon and Ramsey.

Duker was the overall winner, with Ramsey as runner-up, Christie in 3rd, O'Hanlon in 4th, and Love finishing last.

This was the first full series to see the return of a live studio audience.

During its broadcast, the series averaged over 2.06 million viewers.

No. overall	No. in series	Title	Winner	Original air date	UK Viewers (Note: As of series 13, ratings were no longer regularly available in 28-day consolidated. Unless otherwise specified, ratings are 7-day consolidated on TV only, excluding device viewership.)
107	1	"The Noise that Blue Makes"	Chris Ramsey	14 April 2022	2,159,000
108	2	"Birdy Hand Finger"	Chris Ramsey	21 April 2022	2,234,000
109	3	"I Think I've Got This"	Bridget Christie	28 April 2022	1,974,000
110	4	"Shoe Who"	Ardal O'Hanlon	5 May 2022	2,268,000
111	5	"Having a Little Chuckle"	Ardal O'Hanlon	12 May 2022	2,046,000
112	6	"The 75th Question"	Sophie Duker	19 May 2022	2,050,000
113	7	"Heg"	Sophie Duker	26 May 2022	1,923,000
114	8	"You Tuper Super"	Bridget Christie	2 June 2022	1,895,000
115	9	"It Might Be Wind"	Chris Ramsey	9 June 2022	2,001,000
116	10	"The House Queens"	Sophie Duker	16 June 2022	2,130,000

=== Champion of Champions II (2022) ===
On 17 December 2020, Avalon announced that Taskmaster would have a second "Champion of Champions" special, featuring the winners from series 6–10—Ed Gamble, Kerry Godliman, Liza Tarbuck, Lou Sanders and Richard Herring. The episode was aired on 23 June 2022, a week after the Series 13 final. Herring was the special's overall winner, with Tarbuck placing second, Godliman and Sanders tying for third, and Gamble finishing last.

Previous contestant James Acaster made a cameo appearance in Godliman's attempt at a task.

No. overall	No. in series	Title	Winner	Original air date	UK Viewers
117	1	"The Alpine Darling"	Richard Herring	23 June 2022	2,009,000

=== Series 14 (2022) ===
Following the broadcast of Champion of Champions II on 23 June 2022, the cast for the show's fourteenth series was announced, to premiere on 29 September 2022. Series 14 features Dara Ó Briain, Fern Brady, John Kearns, Munya Chawawa and Sarah Millican.

For team tasks in this series, the team of three was made up of Ó Briain, Brady and Kearns, with the team of two consisting of Chawawa and Millican.

Remote filming was done at the South Terminal of Gatwick Airport, which was closed due to reduced traffic caused by the COVID-19 pandemic.

Ó Briain was the overall winner, with Millican as runner-up, Chawawa in 3rd and Brady and Kearns tied in last.

During its broadcast, the series averaged over 2.04 million viewers.

No. overall	No. in series	Title	Winner	Original air date	UK Viewers
118	1	"The Chassis, the Wings"	Sarah Millican	29 September 2022	2,041,000
119	2	"Enormous Hugeness"	Dara Ó Briain	6 October 2022	2,103,000
120	3	"Dafty in the Middle"	John Kearns	13 October 2022	2,196,000
121	4	"Crumbs in My Bralette"	Sarah Millican	20 October 2022	1,959,000
122	5	"Chip Biffington"	John Kearns	27 October 2022	2,160,000
123	6	"Long-Legged Lobster"	Sarah Millican	3 November 2022	2,172,000
124	7	"The System of Endless Plates"	Dara Ó Briain	10 November 2022	1,966,000
125	8	"The One that Bats Do"	Munya Chawawa	17 November 2022	1,788,000
126	9	"A New Business End"	Fern Brady	24 November 2022	1,926,000
127	10	"Did I Meet These Potatoes Before?"	Dara Ó Briain	1 December 2022	2,155,000

=== New Year Treat III (2023) ===
On 21 November 2022, it was revealed that the cast for the third New Year special would be Amelia Dimoldenberg, Carol Vorderman, Greg James, Mo Farah and Rebecca Lucy Taylor.

Farah was the overall winner, with Dimoldenberg, Vorderman, James and Taylor all tied as runner-up.

No. overall	No. in series	Title	Winner	Original air date	UK Viewers
128	1	"That's a Swizz"	Mo Farah	1 January 2023	2,260,000 (Note: 2.41m in 28-day consolidation.)

=== Series 15 (2023) ===
Following the final of series 14 on 1 December 2022, the cast for the show's fifteenth series was announced. Series 15 features Frankie Boyle, Ivo Graham, Jenny Eclair, Kiell Smith-Bynoe and Mae Martin.

For team tasks in this series, the team of three was made up of Eclair, Smith-Bynoe and Martin, with the team of two consisting of Boyle and Graham.

Martin was the overall winner, with Smith-Bynoe as runner-up, Eclair in 3rd, Boyle in 4th, and Graham finishing last.

Remote filming for some tasks took place at Frogmore Paper Mill.

During its broadcast, the series averaged over 2.00 million viewers.

No. overall	No. in series	Title	Winner	Original air date	UK Viewers
129	1	"The Curse of Politeness"	Mae Martin	30 March 2023	2,299,000
130	2	"Trapped in a Loveless Marriage"	Ivo Graham	6 April 2023	2,237,000
131	3	"I Love to Squander Promise"	Ivo Graham	13 April 2023	2,044,000
132	4	"How Heavy Is the Water?"	Jenny Eclair	20 April 2023 (Note: This episode was shown at the later time of 10:30pm to accommodate for the finale of Scared of the Dark. It was made available at the usual broadcast time of 9pm on All4.)	1,636,000 (Note: This does not include viewers who watched the episode on All4 prior to its linear broadcast.)
133	5	"Old Honkfoot"	Mae Martin	27 April 2023	1,919,000
134	6	"It's My Milk Now"	Mae Martin	4 May 2023	1,783,000
135	7	"Schrödinger's Egg"	Kiell Smith-Bynoe	11 May 2023	1,706,000
136	8	"100% Bosco"	Kiell Smith-Bynoe	18 May 2023	2,209,000
137	9	"A Show About Pedantry"	Kiell Smith-Bynoe	25 May 2023	2,145,000
138	10	"A Yardstick for Failure"	Jenny Eclair	1 June 2023	2,034,000

=== Series 16 (2023) ===
Following the final of series 15 on 1 June 2023, the cast for the sixteenth series was announced. Series 16 features Julian Clary, Lucy Beaumont, Sam Campbell, Sue Perkins and Susan Wokoma.

For the team tasks in this series, the team of three was made up of Clary, Beaumont and Campbell, with the team of two consisting of Perkins and Wokoma.

Campbell was the overall winner, with Clary as runner-up, Wokoma in 3rd, Perkins in 4th, and Beaumont finishing last.

During its broadcast, the series averaged over 2.16 million viewers.

No. overall	No. in series	Title	Winner	Original air date	UK Viewers
139	1	"The Natural Friends"	Sam Campbell	21 September 2023	2,277,000
140	2	"Hell Is Here"	Sue Perkins	28 September 2023	2,169,000
141	3	"Languidly"	Sam Campbell	5 October 2023	2,193,000
142	4	"Dynamite Chicks"	Sue Perkins	12 October 2023	2,119,000
143	5	"Skateboard Division"	Julian Clary	19 October 2023	2,240,000
144	6	"Brother Alex"	Lucy Beaumont	26 October 2023	2,226,000
145	7	"I'm Off to Find a Robin"	Lucy Beaumont	2 November 2023 (Note: This episode was shown at the later time of 10pm to accommodate for the penultimate episode of Don't Look Down. It was made available at the usual broadcast time of 9pm on Channel 4's streaming service.)	1,998,000
146	8	"Never Packed a Boot"	Susan Wokoma	9 November 2023	2,251,000
147	9	"Fagin at the Disco"	Sue Perkins	16 November 2023	2,182,000
148	10	"Always Forks and Marbles"	Julian Clary	23 November 2023	2,014,000

=== New Year Treat IV (2024) ===
On 23 November 2023, following the broadcast of the series 16 finale, it was revealed that the cast for the fourth New Year special would be Deborah Meaden, Kojey Radical, Lenny Rush, Steve Backshall and Zoe Ball.

Rush was the overall winner, with Backshall as runner-up, Radical in 3rd, and Meaden and Ball tied last.

No. overall	No. in series	Title	Winner	Original air date	UK Viewers
149	1	"Huh?"	Lenny Rush	2 January 2024	2,020,000

=== Champion of Champions III (2024) ===
Airing in early 2024, this special features the winners of series 11 through 14, namely Sarah Kendall, Morgana Robinson, Sophie Duker and Dara Ó Briain; series 15 winner Mae Martin was unavailable at the time of filming, and runner-up Kiell Smith-Bynoe took their place.

Ó Briain was the special's overall winner, with Duker as runner-up, Robinson in third, and Kendall and Smith-Bynoe tied last.

No. overall	No. in series	Title	Winner	Original air date	UK Viewers
150	1	"Spider in My Pocket"	Dara Ó Briain	14 January 2024	1,710,000

=== Series 17 (2024) ===
Following the broadcast of Champion of Champions III on 14 January 2024, the cast for the show's seventeenth series was announced, featuring Joanne McNally, John Robins, Nick Mohammed, Sophie Willan and Steve Pemberton.

For the team tasks in this series, the team of three is made up of McNally, Robins and Willan, with the team of two consisting of Mohammed and Pemberton.

Robins was the overall winner, with McNally as runner-up, Pemberton in 3rd, Willan in 4th, and Mohammed finishing last. The series averaged 1.90 million viewers, including viewership within a week of broadcast; including viewership within four weeks of broadcast and on devices, it was approx. 2.66 million.

No. overall	No. in series	Title	Winner	Original air date	UK viewers (millions)
151	1	"Grappling with My Life"	Steve Pemberton	28 March 2024	2.03 (Note: Total viewership across devices within 28 days of broadcast was 3.15m.)
152	2	"Jumungo"	Steve Pemberton	4 April 2024	1.95 (Note: Total viewership across devices within 28 days of broadcast was 2.82m.)
153	3	"Some Impropriety?"	John Robins	11 April 2024	1.91
154	4	"Apropos of Apoppo"	John Robins	18 April 2024	1.94
155	5	"Snooker Cue Umbrella Chin"	John Robins	25 April 2024	1.85
156	6	"A Three Ring Man"	Joanne McNally	2 May 2024	1.89 (Note: Total viewership across devices within 28 days of broadcast was 2.59m.)
157	7	"Dream Date Territory"	Nick Mohammed	9 May 2024	1.85 (Note: Total viewership across devices within 28 days of broadcast was 2.59m.)
158	8	"The Umbrella Wink"	John Robins	16 May 2024	1.81 (Note: Total viewership across devices within 28 days of broadcast was 2.42m.)
159	9	"Assistantbury"	John Robins	23 May 2024	1.91
160	10	"Ambience and Information"	Sophie Willan	30 May 2024	1.88 (Note: Total viewership across devices within 28 days of broadcast was 2.40m.)

=== Series 18 (2024) ===
Following the broadcast of the final episode of series 17 on 30 May 2024, the cast for the show's eighteenth series was announced, featuring Andy Zaltzman, Babatunde Aléshé, Emma Sidi, Jack Dee and Rosie Jones.

For the team tasks in this series, the team of three is made up of Zaltzman, Aléshé and Sidi, with the team of two consisting of Dee and Jones.

Remote filming took place at Thorpe Park.

Zaltzman was the overall winner, with Dee as runner-up, Sidi in 3rd, Aléshé in 4th, and Jones finishing last. During its broadcast, the series averaged over 1.64 million viewers.

No. overall	No. in series	Title	Winner	Original air date	UK viewers (millions)
161	1	"The Faceless Facilitators"	Rosie Jones	12 September 2024	1.80 (Note: Total viewership across devices within 28 days of broadcast was 2.57m.)
162	2	"...And Then a Detective Comes In"	Jack Dee	19 September 2024	1.69
163	3	"The Gangsters of the Sea"	Andy Zaltzman	26 September 2024	1.60
164	4	"I'm a Girl Who Likes a Clean Line"	Babatunde Aléshé	3 October 2024	1.62
165	5	"Big Stupid Things"	Emma Sidi	10 October 2024	1.62
166	6	"A Dance as Old as Time Itself"	Andy Zaltzman	17 October 2024	1.53
167	7	"Captain Jackie and the Hotdog"	Emma Sidi	24 October 2024	1.53
168	8	"The Nexus of Truth"	Andy Zaltzman	31 October 2024	1.53
169	9	"The Cockle Children"	Emma Sidi	7 November 2024	1.72
170	10	"Le Goose"	Emma Sidi	14 November 2024	1.75

=== New Year Treat V (2024) ===
On 14 November 2024, following the broadcast of the series 18 finale, it was revealed that the cast for the fifth New Year special would be David James, Hannah Fry, Martin Lewis, Melanie Blatt and Sue Johnston.

Sue Johnston was the overall winner, with Hannah Fry as the runner up, Martin Lewis in third, David James in fourth, and Melanie Blatt in last place.

No. overall	No. in series	Title	Winner	Original air date	UK Viewers
171	1	"412 Steps"	Sue Johnston	29 December 2024	N/A

=== Series 19 (2025) ===
The studio elements of the nineteenth series were recorded from 18 September to 24 September 2024.

The cast for the show's nineteenth series was announced on 22 January 2025, featuring Fatiha El-Ghorri, Jason Mantzoukas, Mathew Baynton, Rosie Ramsey and Stevie Martin. For the team tasks in this series, the team of three is made up of El-Ghorri, Baynton and Ramsey, with the team of two consisting of Mantzoukas and Martin.

In the ninth episode, former contestants Aisling Bea and Nish Kumar were individually featured during separate task attempts by Mantzoukas.

Baynton was the overall winner, with Martin as runner up, Mantzoukas in 3rd, Ramsey in 4th, and El-Ghorri finishing in last. The series, including viewership within a week post-broadcast, averaged approx. 2.27 million viewers; with viewership within four weeks of broadcast, this rose to a 2.84 million average.

No. overall	No. in series	Title	Winner	Original air date	UK viewers (m) (7-day / 28-day)
172	1	"Sometimes Spit"	Mathew Baynton	1 May 2025	2.31 / 2.96
173	2	"An Invisible Jump Rope"	Mathew Baynton	8 May 2025	N/A (<2.37) (Note: Not reported in the weekly top 50 programmes for four-screen viewer ratings.) / 2.97
174	3	"My Presumably Scrotum"	Mathew Baynton	15 May 2025	2.22 / 2.80
175	4	"Midnight Picnic"	Rosie Ramsey	22 May 2025	2.24 / 2.92
176	5	"Maybe We're the Monsters"	Jason Mantzoukas	29 May 2025	N/A (<2.27) / 2.86
177	6	"It's Got to Be Obsolete"	Fatiha El-Ghorri	5 June 2025	2.23 / 2.80
178	7	"Glass Half Most"	Mathew Baynton	12 June 2025 (Note: This episode was shown at the later time of 10:05pm to accommodate for the England v Czechia match of the 2025 UEFA European Under-21s Championship. Contrary to previous similar occasions, the episode was not uploaded early to Channel 4 on-demand, however the Bleeped version of the episode was made available at 9pm as usual.)	2.31 / 2.80
179	8	"Science All Your Life"	Stevie Martin	19 June 2025	2.31 / 2.78
180	9	"Getaway Sticks"	Jason Mantzoukas	26 June 2025	2.22 / 2.75
181	10	"The Clever Side?"	Stevie Martin	3 July 2025	2.28 / 2.73

=== Series 20 (2025) ===
Following the broadcast of the final episode of series 19 on 3 July 2025, the cast for the show's twentieth series was announced, featuring Ania Magliano, Maisie Adam, Phil Ellis, Reece Shearsmith and Sanjeev Bhaskar. The series was broadcast from September to November 2025.

For the team tasks in this series, the team of three is made up of Magliano, Ellis and Bhaskar, with the team of two consisting of Adam and Shearsmith (although the fourth episode featured a task in which Magliano and Adam swapped teams).

Remote filming took place at Sandown Park Racecourse.

This is the first series which required a tiebreaker due to multiple contestants tying in series points; Adam, Magliano and Ellis initially tied for first, but Adam won a tie-breaker challenge to win the series. Shearsmith placed fourth and Bhaskar finished in last.

No. overall	No. in series	Title	Winner	Original air date	UK viewers (m) (7-day / 28-day)
182	1	"9 x 7"	Maisie Adam	11 September 2025	2.31 / 2.93
183	2	"Cows Are Made of Milk"	Reece Shearsmith	18 September 2025	N/A (<2.15) / 2.61
184	3	"Thompson"	Maisie Adam	25 September 2025	N/A (<2.24) / 2.52
185	4	"Hey Mate"	Ania Magliano	2 October 2025	N/A (<2.44 / <2.84)
186	5	"Bats, Bats, Hang Up"	Phil Ellis	9 October 2025	N/A (<2.32 / <2.83)
187	6	"Is That Number Got Curves?"	Phil Ellis	16 October 2025	N/A (<2.45 / <2.63)
188	7	"Drier Than You Think, Chalk"	Ania Magliano	23 October 2025	N/A (<2.52 / <2.64)
189	8	"Am I an Idiom?"	Reece Shearsmith	30 October 2025	N/A (<2.65 / <2.89)
190	9	"A 1970s Camping Kettle"	Phil Ellis	6 November 2025	N/A (<2.56 / <2.77)
191	10	"Supping from the Fountain"	Maisie Adam	13 November 2025	N/A (<2.38 / <2.60)

=== Champion of Champions IV (2025) ===
The winners of series 16–20 featured in a Champion of Champions special, namely Andy Zaltzman, John Robins, Maisie Adam, Mathew Baynton, and Sam Campbell.

Baynton was the special's overall winner, with Adam as runner-up, Robins in third, Zaltzman in fourth and Campbell last.

No. overall	No. in series	Title	Winner	Original air date	UK viewers (millions)
192	1	"Put That on My Gravestone"	Mathew Baynton	22 December 2025	2.25 (7-day, excl. devices)

=== New Year Treat VI (2026) ===
Two episodes with contestants Big Zuu, Jill Scott, Rose Ayling-Ellis, Sam Ryder and Susie Dent were confirmed to be broadcast.

Ayling-Ellis won the second episode and the two part special. Scott won the first episode and finished runner-up, with Ryder in third, Zuu in fourth and Dent finishing last.

No. overall	No. in series	Title	Winner	Original release date	UK viewers (millions)
193	1	"Welcome to My Pumpathon"	Jill Scott	2 January 2026	1.99 (7-day, excl. devices)
194	2	"The Opposite of Ducking?"	Rose Ayling-Ellis	3 January 2026	1.59 (7-day, excl. devices)

=== Series 21 (2026) ===
Following the broadcast of the final episode of New Year's Treat on 3 January 2026, the cast for the show's twenty-first series was announced, featuring Amy Gledhill, Armando Iannucci, Joanna Page, Joel Dommett and Kumail Nanjiani. The series began on 9 April 2026.

For team tasks in this series, the team of three is made up of Gledhill, Dommett and Nanjiani, with the team of two consisting of Iannucci and Page.

During the sixth episode, former contestant Jason Mantzoukas features as a voiceover announcer in a task.

Remote filming took place at Hampton Court Palace.

Page won the series, with Iannucci finishing as runner-up. Nanjiani finished third, Gledhill fourth and Dommett in last place.

No. overall	No. in series	Title	Winner	Original air date	UK viewers (m) (7-day / 28-day)
195	1	"Cube Is Good"	Joanna Page	9 April 2026	N/A (<2.21) / 2.86
196	2	"Leg Up, Johnny!"	Amy Gledhill	16 April 2026	N/A (<2.23) / 2.63
197	3	"A Creepy Bit of Advice"	Amy Gledhill	23 April 2026	N/A (<2.05) / 2.47
198	4	"Lou Reed and The Wombles"	Joel Dommett	30 April 2026	N/A (<1.97) / 2.42
199	5	"I Corroborate"	Armando Iannucci	7 May 2026	N/A (<2.07 / <2.45)
200	6	"An Even Bigger Spoon"	Kumail Nanjiani	14 May 2026	N/A (<1.96) / 2.26
201	7	"Putting Things on Things"	Armando Iannucci	21 May 2026	N/A (<2.11) / 2.29
202	8	"I Don't Got Any"	Amy Gledhill	28 May 2026	N/A (<1.99) / 2.30
203	9	"Maybe Someone Else Wrote Veep?"	Armando Iannucci	4 June 2026	N/A (<2.18 / <2.20)
204	10	"Domestic Bumfluff"	Joel Dommett	11 June 2026	N/A (<2.14 / <2.20)

=== Series 22 (2026) ===
Following the finale of Series 21 on 11 June 2026, the cast for the show's twenty-second series was announced, featuring Chloe Petts, Isy Suttie, Matt Lucas, Nina Conti and Richard Ayoade. The series began on 3 September 2026.

For the team tasks in this series, the team of three is made up of Petts, Lucas and Ayoade, with the team of two consisting of Suttie and Conti.

Former series 3 contestant Paul Chowdhry appeared as part of a task in episode 7.

Remote filming took place at the London Museum of Water & Steam.

Petts won the series, with Conti finishing as runner-up, Suttie finishing third, Lucas fourth and Ayoade in last place.

No. overall	No. in series	Title	Winner	Original air date	UK viewers (m) (7-day / 28-day)
205	1	"In My Mind There's a River"	Chloe Petts	3 September 2026	N/A (<2.19) / 2.92
206	2	"This Is Food Glue"	Richard Ayoade	10 September 2026	N/A (<2.06) / 2.42
207	3	"The Butterfly Centurion"	Chloe Petts	17 September 2026	N/A (<2.12) / 2.38
208	4	"An Act of Self-Erasure"	Isy Suttie	24 September 2026	N/A (<2.01) / TBD
209	5	"You're Nice"	Chloe Petts	1 October 2026	N/A (<2.20) / TBD
210	6	"To Void an Oblong"	Chloe Petts	8 October 2026	N/A (<2.10) / TBD
211	7	"The Oldest I've Ever Looked"	Chloe Petts	15 October 2026	N/A (<2.13) / TBD
212	8	"The Unfairity"	Nina Conti	22 October 2026	TBD
213	9	"A Very Televisual Torso"	Isy Suttie	29 October 2026	TBD
214	10	"Big, Clumsy Emu Steps"	Matt Lucas	5 November 2026	TBD

== Junior Taskmaster ==
Junior Taskmaster is a spinoff series hosted by Rose Matafeo and Mike Wozniak featuring contestants aged between 9 and 11. Each of the first five episodes pits five new contestants against each other, with the two top scorers in each heat returning for two semi-finals. The top two scorers in each semi-final, along with the highest-scoring third-placer, then compete in the final to win the series.

The winner of the series was Shenaya, who originally competed in the third episode.

The contestants who progressed to the next stage of the competition are marked in bold.

No. overall	No. in series	Title	Contestants	Winner	Original air date	UK viewers (millions)
Heats
1	1	"Happy Birthday Bandana"	**Anita**, Lazer, Nyarah, **Persia** and Reuben	Anita	8 November 2024	0.88
2	2	"Would a Bird Fly?"	Cyra, **Gwen**, Maisie, Ollie and **Zac**	Gwen	15 November 2024	0.59
3	3	"Rustic Shin Pad"	Ebrima, **Finley**, George, Liana and **Shenaya**	Finley	22 November 2024	0.63
4	4	"Overthinking Overthinking"	Billy, Emilie, **Jamie**, Kaif and **Kyra**	Kyra	29 November 2024	0.49
5	5	"Nice Shiny Buttons"	**August**, Olivia, Reuben, **Scarlett** and Sid	Scarlett	6 December 2024	0.58
Semi-Finals
6	6	"You Can't Milk A Pigeon"	**Anita**, August, Finley, **Persia** and Scarlett	Persia	13 December 2024	0.48
7	7	"Shout-Out to Slow Maths"	**Gwen**, **Jamie**, Kyra, **Shenaya** and Zac	Jamie	20 December 2024	0.52
Final
8	8	"Balloon Carcasses"	Anita, Gwen, Jamie, Persia, Shenaya	Shenaya	23 December 2024	0.45

== Taskmasterclass ==
Taskmasterclass is a series of occasional specials narrated by Davies and Horne in character as the Taskmaster and the Taskmaster's Assistant, that acts as a clip show looking back at tasks over the years, with specific emphasis on how they were attempted and focus on certain contestants and outcomes.

A press release prior to the first special's broadcast detailed that it would feature past contestants discussing previous task attempts, as well as a behind-the-scenes look at the show; this was not the case.

No.	Title	Original air date	UK viewers (millions)
1	"What's the Point?"	6 June 2024	1.01
Contains special focus on tasks featuring Paul Chowdhry, and tasks in which Alex Horne suffered at the hands of the contestants.
2	"Education For All"	10 January 2025	N/A
Explores how the show has provided contestants with a "rounded educational experience", via tasks incidentally representing and exploring the various subjects of a standard school curriculum.
3	"The State of Comedy"	16 January 2026	0.53
Investigates how the show - with contributions from such a wide variety and history of contestants - defies restriction, in justification for viewership and the senses of humour appealed to.
4	"The End of the World"	23 January 2026	0.50
Post-societal collapse, an examination of how the portents were there, through the displays of blatant cheating, subterfuge, and exploitation of greed and wealth to gain an advantage, as well as the moments of unadulterated anger that exposed how quickly contestants' true nature could be revealed.

== Podcasts ==
On 15 October 2020, an official podcast began. It is hosted by Ed Gamble, the winner of Series 9, who comments on each featured episode with a special guest. Initially it focused on Series 10, with each podcast released immediately after each Taskmaster episode was broadcast. Episode 12 of the podcast focused on the 2021 "New Year Treat", and then from episode 13 onwards it returned to the very beginning starting with Taskmaster Series 1 Episode 1, returning to "real-time" episodes during the broadcast run of the new series and returning to the older series in the off-season.

Episode	Topic	Guest	Guest's series	Released
1	Series 10, episode 1	Alex Horne	Taskmaster's Assistant	15 October 2020
2	Series 10, episode 2	Nish Kumar	Series 5	22 October 2020
3	Series 10, episode 3	Jo Brand	Series 9	29 October 2020
4	Series 10, episode 4	Paul Chowdhry	Series 3	5 November 2020
5	Series 10, episode 5	James Acaster	Series 7	12 November 2020
6	Series 10, episode 6	Jessica Knappett	Series 7	19 November 2020
7	Series 10, episode 7	Rose Matafeo	Series 9, The Taskmaster (Junior)	26 November 2020
8	Series 10, episode 8	Richard Osman	Series 2	3 December 2020
9	Series 10, episode 9	Katy Wix	Series 9	10 December 2020
10	Series 10, episode 10	Richard Herring	Series 10 & CoC II Winner	17 December 2020
11	Series 10	Greg Davies	The Taskmaster	24 December 2020
12	New Year Treat	Scroobius Pip	Not a former contestant	1 January 2021
13	Series 1, episode 1	Alex Horne	Taskmaster's Assistant	7 January 2021
14	Series 1, episode 2	Tim Key	Series 1	14 January 2021
15	Series 1, episode 3	Josh Widdicombe	Series 1 & CoC I Winner	21 January 2021
16	Series 1, episode 4	Nicola Coughlan	New Year Treat	28 January 2021
17	Series 1, episode 5	Jayde Adams	Not a former contestant	4 February 2021
18	Series 1, episode 6	Romesh Ranganathan	Series 1	11 February 2021
19	Series 2, episode 1	Joe Wilkinson	Series 2	18 February 2021
20	Series 2, episode 2	Sian Gibson	Series 8	25 February 2021
21	Series 2, episode 3	Doc Brown	Series 2	4 March 2021
22	Series 2, episode 4	Kerry Godliman	Series 7 Winner	11 March 2021
23	Series 2, episode 5	Richard Osman	Series 2	11 March 2021
24	Series 11, episode 1	Richard Herring	Series 10 & CoC II Winner	18 March 2021
25	Series 11, episode 2	Jamali Maddix	Series 11	25 March 2021
26	Series 11, episode 3	Katherine Parkinson	Series 10	1 April 2021
27	Series 11, episode 4	Rick Edwards	Not a former contestant	8 April 2021
28	Series 11, episode 5	Sarah Kendall	Series 11 Winner	15 April 2021
29	Series 11, episode 6	Mike Wozniak	Series 11, Taskmaster's Assistant (Junior)	22 April 2021
30	Series 11, episode 7	Charlotte Ritchie	Series 11	29 April 2021
31	Series 11, episode 8	Lee Mack	Series 11	6 May 2021
32	Series 11, episode 9	Margaret Cabourn-Smith	Not a former contestant	13 May 2021
33	Series 11, episode 10	Alex Horne	Taskmaster's Assistant	20 May 2021
33	Series 11, episode 10	Sarah Kendall	Series 11 Winner	20 May 2021
34	Series 3, episode 1	Al Murray	Series 3	27 May 2021
35	Series 3, episode 2	Dave Gorman	Series 3	3 June 2021
36	Series 3, episode 3	Katy Wix	Series 9	10 June 2021
37	Series 3, episode 4	Paul Chowdhry	Series 3	17 June 2021
38	Series 3, episode 5	Maisie Adam	Series 20 Winner	24 June 2021
39	Series 4, episode 1	Mark Watson	Series 5	1 July 2021
40	Series 4, episode 2	Jack Bernhardt	Taskmaster Statistician	8 July 2021
41	Series 4, episode 3	Hugh Dennis	Series 4	15 July 2021
42	Series 4, episode 4	Mel Giedroyc	Series 4	22 July 2021
43	Series 4, episode 5	Iain Stirling	Series 8	29 July 2021
44	Series 4, episode 6	Phil Wang	Series 7	5 August 2021
45	Series 4, episode 7	Margaret Cabourn-Smith	Not a former contestant	12 August 2021
46	Series 4, episode 8	Jack Bernhardt	Taskmaster Statistician	19 August 2021
47	Series 12, episode 1	Mike Wozniak	Series 11, Taskmaster's Assistant (Junior)	23 September 2021
48	Series 12, episode 2	Paul Williams	Taskmaster's Assistant (NZ Version)	30 September 2021
49	Series 12, episode 3	Desiree Burch	Series 12	7 October 2021
50	Series 12, episode 4	Victoria Coren Mitchell	Series 12	14 October 2021
51	Series 12, episode 5	David Correos	Series 2 (NZ Version)	21 October 2021
52	Series 12, episode 6	Alan Davies	Series 12	28 October 2021
53	Series 12, episode 7	Al Murray	Series 3	4 November 2021
54	Series 12, episode 8	Liza Tarbuck	Series 6 Winner	11 November 2021
55	Series 12, episode 9	Richard Herring	Series 10 & CoC II Winner	18 November 2021
56	Series 12, episode 10	Morgana Robinson	Series 12 Winner	25 November 2021
57	Series 5, episode 1	Nish Kumar	Series 5	2 December 2021
58	Series 5, episode 2	Guy Montgomery	Series 2 (NZ Version)	9 December 2021
59	Series 5, episode 3	Josh Widdicombe	Series 1 & CoC I Winner	16 December 2021
60	Series 5, episode 4	Lou Sanders	Series 8 Winner	23 December 2021
61	New Year Treat II	Adrian Chiles	New Year Treat II Winner	1 January 2022
62	Series 5, episode 5	Mark Watson	Series 5	6 January 2022
63	Series 5, episode 6	Jack Bernhardt	Taskmaster Statistician	13 January 2022
64	Series 5, episode 7	Aisling Bea	Series 5	20 January 2022
65	Series 5, episode 8	Kerry Godliman	Series 7 Winner	27 January 2022
66	Champion of Champions, episode 1	Guz Khan	Series 12	3 February 2022
67	Champion of Champions, episode 2	Alex Horne	Taskmaster's Assistant	10 February 2022
68	Series 6, episode 1	Tim Vine	Series 6	17 February 2022
69	Series 6, episode 2	Greg Jenner	Not a former contestant	24 February 2022
70	Series 6, episode 3	Russell Howard	Series 6	3 March 2022
71	Series 6, episode 4	Chloe Petts	Series 22	10 March 2022
72	Series 6, episode 5	Margaret Cabourn-Smith	Not a former contestant	17 March 2022
73	Series 6, episode 6	Tim Key	Series 1	24 March 2022
74	Series 6, episode 7	Sarah Kendall	Series 11 Winner	31 March 2022
75	Series 6, episode 8	Dave Gorman	Series 3	7 April 2022
76	Series 13, episode 1	Desiree Burch	Series 12	14 April 2022
77	Series 13, episode 2	Sophie Duker	Series 13 Winner	21 April 2022
78	Series 13, episode 3	Lou Sanders	Series 8 Winner	28 April 2022
79	Series 13, episode 4	Ardal O'Hanlon	Series 13	5 May 2022
80	Series 13, episode 5	Chris Ramsey	Series 13	12 May 2022
81	Series 13, episode 6	Bridget Christie	Series 13	19 May 2022
82	Series 13, episode 7	Rick Edwards	Not a former contestant	26 May 2022
83	Series 13, episode 8	Rosie Ramsey	Series 19	2 June 2022
84	Series 13, episode 9	Jack Bernhardt	Taskmaster Statistician	9 June 2022
85	Series 13, episode 10	Sophie Duker	Series 13 Winner	16 June 2022
86	Champion of Champions II	Richard Herring	Series 10 & CoC II Winner	23 June 2022
87	Series 6, episode 9	Laura Daniel	Series 2 Winner (NZ Version)	30 June 2022
88	Series 6, episode 10	Jamali Maddix	Series 11	7 July 2022
-	Best of: Part 1	Various	Various	14 July 2022
-	Best of: Part 2	Various	Various	21 July 2022
89	Series 7, episode 1	Kerry Godliman	Series 7 Winner	28 July 2022
90	Series 7, episode 2	Liza Tarbuck	Series 6 Winner	4 August 2022
91	Series 7, episode 3	Phil Wang	Series 7	11 August 2022
92	Series 7, episode 4	Katy Wix	Series 9	18 August 2022
93	Series 7, episode 5	Brynley Stent	Series 1 (NZ Version)	25 August 2022
94	Series 7, episode 6	Tim Key	Series 1	1 September 2022
95	Series 7, episode 7	Jack Bernhardt	Taskmaster Statistician	8 September 2022
96	Series 7, episode 8	Nish Kumar	Series 5	15 September 2022
97	Series 7, episode 9	James Acaster	Series 7	22 September 2022
98	Series 14, episode 1	Chris Ramsey	Series 13	29 September 2022
99	Series 14, episode 2	Dave Gorman	Series 3	6 October 2022
100	Series 14, episode 3	John Kearns	Series 14	13 October 2022
101	Series 14, episode 4	Fern Brady	Series 14	20 October 2022
102	Series 14, episode 5	Rose Matafeo	Series 9, The Taskmaster (Junior)	27 October 2022
103	Series 14, episode 6	Dara Ó Briain	Series 14 & CoC III Winner	3 November 2022
104	Series 14, episode 7	Sarah Kendall	Series 11 Winner	10 November 2022
105	Series 14, episode 8	Richard Herring	Series 10 and CoC II Winner	17 November 2022
106	Series 14, episode 9	Greg Jenner	Not a former contestant	24 November 2022
107	Series 14, episode 10	Sarah Millican	Series 14	1 December 2022
108	Series 7, episode 10	Paul F. Tompkins	Not a former contestant	8 December 2022
109	Series 8, episode 1	Margaret Cabourn-Smith	Not a former contestant	15 December 2022
110	Series 8, episode 2	Paul Sinha	Series 8	22 December 2022
111	New Year Treat III	Greg James	New Year Treat III	1 January 2023
112	Series 8, episode 3	Joe Thomas	Series 8	5 January 2023
113	Series 8, episode 4	Andy Cartwright	Series Producer	12 January 2023
114	Series 8, episode 5	Lou Sanders	Series 8 Winner	19 January 2023
115	Series 8, episode 6	Iain Stirling	Series 8	26 January 2023
116	Series 8, episode 7	John Kearns	Series 14	2 February 2023
117	Series 8, episode 8	Alex Horne	Taskmaster's Assistant	9 February 2023
118	Series 8, episode 9	Rebecca Lucy Taylor	New Year Treat III	16 February 2023
119	Series 8, episode 10	Urzila Carlson	Series 2 (NZ Version)	23 February 2023
120	Series 9, episode 1	David Baddiel	Series 9	2 March 2023
121	Series 9, episode 2	Jo Brand	Series 9	9 March 2023
122	Series 9, episode 3	Nish Kumar	Series 5	16 March 2023
123	Series 9, episode 4	Hugh Dennis	Series 4	23 March 2023
124	Series 15, episode 1	Dara Ó Briain	Series 14 & CoC III Winner	30 March 2023
125	Series 15, episode 2	Kiell Smith-Bynoe	Series 15	6 April 2023
126	Series 15, episode 3	Jenny Eclair	Series 15	13 April 2023
127	Series 15, episode 4	Frankie Boyle	Series 15	20 April 2023
128	Series 15, episode 5	Ivo Graham	Series 15	27 April 2023
129	Series 15, episode 6	Charlotte Ritchie	Series 11	4 May 2023
130	Series 15, episode 7	Chris Parker	Series 3 (NZ Version)	11 May 2023
131	Series 15, episode 8	Andy Devonshire	Series Director	18 May 2023
132	Series 15, episode 9	Sally Phillips	Series 5	25 May 2023
133	Series 15, episode 10	Mae Martin	Series 15 Winner	1 June 2023
-	Best of: Part 3	Various	Various	8 June 2023
134	Series 9, episode 5	Greg Davies	The Taskmaster	15 June 2023
135	Series 9, episode 6	Paul Chowdhry	Series 3	22 June 2023
136	Series 9, episode 7	Sophie Duker	Series 13 Winner	29 June 2023
137	Series 9, episode 8	Paul Williams	Taskmaster's Assistant (NZ Version)	6 July 2023
138	Series 9, episode 9	Jenny Eclair	Series 15	14 July 2023
139	Series 9, episode 10	Rose Matafeo	Series 9, The Taskmaster (Junior)	27 July 2023
140	Series 16, episode 1	Ivo Graham	Series 15	21 September 2023
141	Series 16, episode 2	Sam Campbell	Series 16 Winner	28 September 2023
142	Series 16, episode 3	Lucy Beaumont	Series 16	5 October 2023
143	Series 16, episode 4	Julian Clary	Series 16	12 October 2023
144	Series 16, episode 5	Sue Perkins	Series 16	19 October 2023
145	Series 16, episode 6	Susan Wokoma	Series 16	26 October 2023
146	Series 16, episode 7	Mark Watson	Series 5	2 November 2023
147	Series 16, episode 8	Greg Jenner	Not a former contestant	9 November 2023
148	Series 16, episode 9	John Kearns	Series 14	16 November 2023
149	Series 16, episode 10	Sam Campbell	Series 16 Winner	23 November 2023
-	Series 16 Best of #1	Various	Various	14 December 2023
-	Series 16 Best of #2	Various	Various	21 December 2023
150	New Year Treat IV	Lenny Rush	New Year Treat IV Winner	2 January 2024
151	Champion of Champions III	Dara Ó Briain	Series 14 & CoC III Winner	14 January 2024
152	Series 17, episode 1	John Robins	Series 17 Winner	28 March 2024
153	Series 17, episode 2	Steve Pemberton	Series 17	4 April 2024
154	Series 17, episode 3	Lou Sanders	Series 8 Winner	11 April 2024
155	Series 17, episode 4	Nick Mohammed	Series 17	18 April 2024
156	Series 17, episode 5	Joanne McNally	Series 17	25 April 2024
157	Series 17, episode 6	Paul F. Tompkins	Not a former contestant	2 May 2024
158	Series 17, episode 7	Chris Ramsey	Series 13	9 May 2024
159	Series 17, episode 8	Sophie Willan	Series 17	16 May 2024
160	Series 17, episode 9	Kiell Smith-Bynoe	Series 15	23 May 2024
161	Series 17, episode 10	John Robins	Series 17 Winner	30 May 2024
-	Series 17 Best of #1	Various	Various	20 June 2024
-	Series 17 Best of #2	Various	Various	27 June 2024
162	Series 1, episode 1 (NZ version)	Jack Bernhardt	Taskmaster Statistician	4 July 2024
163	Series 1, episode 2 (NZ version)	Brynley Stent	Series 1 (NZ Version)	11 July 2024
164	Series 1, episode 3 (NZ version)	Paul Williams	Taskmaster's Assistant (NZ Version)	18 July 2024
165	Series 1, episode 4 (NZ version)	Guy Williams	Series 1 (NZ Version)	25 July 2024
166	Series 1, episode 5 (NZ version)	Alice Snedden	Series 6 (NZ Version)	1 August 2024
167	Series 1, episode 6 (NZ version)	Angella Dravid	Series 1 Winner (NZ Version)	8 August 2024
168	Series 1, episode 7 (NZ version)	Madeleine Sami	Series 1 (NZ Version)	15 August 2024
169	Series 1, episode 8 (NZ version)	Chris Parker	Series 3 (NZ Version)	22 August 2024
170	Series 1, episode 9 (NZ version)	Kura Forrester	Series 3 (NZ Version)	29 August 2024
171	Series 1, episode 10 (NZ version)	Leigh Hart	Series 1 (NZ Version)	5 September 2024
172	Series 18, episode 1	Babatunde Aléshé	Series 18	12 September 2024
173	Series 18, episode 2	John Robins	Series 17 Winner	19 September 2024
174	Series 18, episode 3	Emma Sidi	Series 18	26 September 2024
175	Series 18, episode 4	Andy Zaltzman	Series 18 Winner	3 October 2024
176	Series 18, episode 5	Jack Dee	Series 18	10 October 2024
177	Series 18, episode 6	Jack Bernhardt	Taskmaster Statistician	17 October 2024
178	Series 18, episode 7	Ivo Graham	Series 15	24 October 2024
179	Series 18, episode 8	Desiree Burch	Series 12	31 October 2024
180	Series 18, episode 9	Rosie Jones	Series 18	7 November 2024
181	Series 1, episode 1 (Junior)	Mike Wozniak	Series 11, Taskmaster's Assistant (Junior)	9 November 2024
182	Series 18, episode 10	Andy Zaltzman	Series 18 Winner	14 November 2024
183	Series 1, episode 2 (Junior)	Emma Sidi	Series 18	15 November 2024
184	Series 1, episode 3 (Junior)	Jenny Eclair	Series 15	22 November 2024
185	Series 1, episode 4 (Junior)	Alex Horne	Taskmaster's Assistant	29 November 2024
186	Series 1, episode 5 (Junior)	Jack Bernhardt	Taskmaster Statistician	6 December 2024
187	Series 1, episode 6 (Junior)	Lou Sanders	Series 8 Winner	13 December 2024
188	Series 1, episode 7 (Junior)	Nish Kumar	Series 5	20 December 2024
189	Series 1, episode 8 (Junior)	Rose Matafeo	Series 9, The Taskmaster (Junior)	23 December 2024
190	New Year Treat V	Melanie Blatt	New Year Treat V	29 December 2024
-	Series 18 Best of	Various	Various	14 December 2024
-	Junior Best of	Various	Various	14 December 2024
191	Series 2, episode 1 (NZ version)	David Correos	Series 2 (NZ Version)	31 January 2025
192	Series 2, episode 2 (NZ version)	Guy Montgomery	Series 2 (NZ Version)	6 February 2025
193	Series 2, episode 3 (NZ version)	Matt Heath	Series 2 (NZ Version)	13 February 2025
194	Series 2, episode 4 (NZ version)	Guy Williams	Series 1 (NZ Version)	20 February 2025
195	Series 2, episode 5 (NZ version)	Urzila Carlson	Series 2 (NZ Version)	27 February 2025
196	Series 2, episode 6 (NZ version)	Melanie Bracewell	Series 4 Winner (NZ Version)	6 March 2025
197	Series 2, episode 7 (NZ version)	Brynley Stent	Series 1 (NZ Version)	13 March 2025
198	Series 2, episode 8 (NZ version)	Jack Bernhardt	Taskmaster Statistician	20 March 2025
199	Series 2, episode 9 (NZ version)	Ray O'Leary	Series 4 (NZ Version)	27 March 2025
200	Series 2, episode 10 (NZ version)	Laura Daniel	Series 2 Winner (NZ Version)	3 April 2025
-	Series 2 (NZ Version) Best of #1	Various	Various	17 April 2025
-	Series 2 (NZ Version) Best of #2	Various	Various	25 April 2025
201	Series 19, episode 1	Nick Mohammed	Series 17	1 May 2025
202	Series 19, episode 2	Mathew Baynton	Series 19 Winner	8 May 2025
203	Series 19, episode 3	Sophie Duker	Series 13 Winner	15 May 2025
204	Series 19, episode 4	Fatiha El-Ghorri	Series 19	22 May 2025
205	Series 19, episode 5	Jason Mantzoukas	Series 19	29 May 2025
206	Series 19, episode 6	Emma Sidi	Series 18	5 June 2025
207	Series 19, episode 7	Stevie Martin	Series 19	12 June 2025
208	Series 19, episode 8	Chris Ramsey	Series 13	19 June 2025
209	Series 19, episode 9	Rosie Ramsey	Series 19	26 June 2025
210	Series 19, episode 10	Mathew Baynton	Series 19 Winner	3 July 2025
-	Series 19 Best of #1	Various	Various	10 July 2025
-	Series 19 Best of #2	Various	Various	17 July 2025
211	Series 20, episode 1	Jason Mantzoukas	Series 19	11 September 2025
212	Series 20, episode 2	Ania Magliano	Series 20	18 September 2025
213	Series 20, episode 3	Reece Shearsmith	Series 20	25 September 2025
214	Series 20, episode 4	Sanjeev Bhaskar	Series 20	2 October 2025
215	Series 20, episode 5	Phil Ellis	Series 20	9 October 2025
216	Series 20, episode 6	Maisie Adam	Series 20 Winner	16 October 2025
217	Series 20, episode 7	Mike Wozniak	Series 11, Taskmaster's Assistant (Junior)	23 October 2025
218	Series 20, episode 8	Stevie Martin	Series 19	30 October 2025
219	Series 20, episode 9	Paul F. Tompkins	Not a former contestant	6 November 2025
220	Series 20, episode 10	Maisie Adam	Series 20 Winner	13 November 2025
-	Series 20 Best of #1	Various	Various	20 November 2025
-	Series 20 Best of #2	Various	Various	20 November 2025
221	Champion of Champions IV	Mathew Baynton	Series 19 & CoC IV Winner	22 December 2025
222	New Year Treat VI, episode 1	Sam Ryder	New Year Treat VI	2 January 2026
223	New Year Treat VI, episode 2	Rose Ayling-Ellis	New Year Treat VI Winner	3 January 2026
224	Series 21, episode 1	Phil Ellis	Series 20	9 April 2026
225	Series 21, episode 2	Armando Iannucci	Series 21	16 April 2026
226	Series 21, episode 3	Joanna Page	Series 21	23 April 2026
227	Series 21, episode 4	Jenny Eclair	Series 15	30 April 2026
228	Series 21, episode 5	Joel Dommett	Series 21	7 May 2026
229	Series 21, episode 6	Amy Gledhill	Series 21	14 May 2026
230	Series 21, episode 7	John Kearns	Series 14	21 May 2026
231	Series 21, episode 8	Jason Mantzoukas	Series 19	28 May 2026
232	Series 21, episode 9	Kumail Nanjiani	Series 21	4 June 2026
233	Series 21, episode 10	Joanna Page	Series 21 Winner	11 June 2026
234	Series 22, episode 1	Reece Shearsmith	Series 20	3 September 2026
235	Series 22, episode 2	Chloe Petts	Series 22	10 September 2026
236	Series 22, episode 3	Lou Sanders	Series 8 Winner	17 September 2026
237	Series 22, episode 4	Isy Suttie	Series 22	24 September 2026
238	Series 22, episode 5	Richard Ayoade	Series 22	1 October 2026
239	Series 22, episode 6	Nina Conti	Series 22	8 October 2026
240	Series 22, episode 7	Armando Iannucci	Series 21	15 October 2026
241	Series 22, episode 8	Joanna Page	Series 21 Winner	22 October 2026
242	Series 22, episode 9	Joel Dommett	Series 21	29 October 2026
243	Series 22, episode 10	Chloe Petts	Series 22 Winner	5 November 2026

Taskmaster: The People's Podcast began 15th April 2022. From the launch of the podcast until September 2023, the podcast was hosted by Series 8 champion Lou Sanders and "stats-master" Jack Bernhardt. In September 2023, Jenny Eclair, 3rd place contender in series 15, took over from Lou Sanders as co-host. The hosts chat stats and facts about the show, and are joined by guests, ranging from the biggest Taskmaster Superfans, to the production team and international contestants/TMs/TM assistants.
