= Sue-Ann Post =

Australian comedian and writer

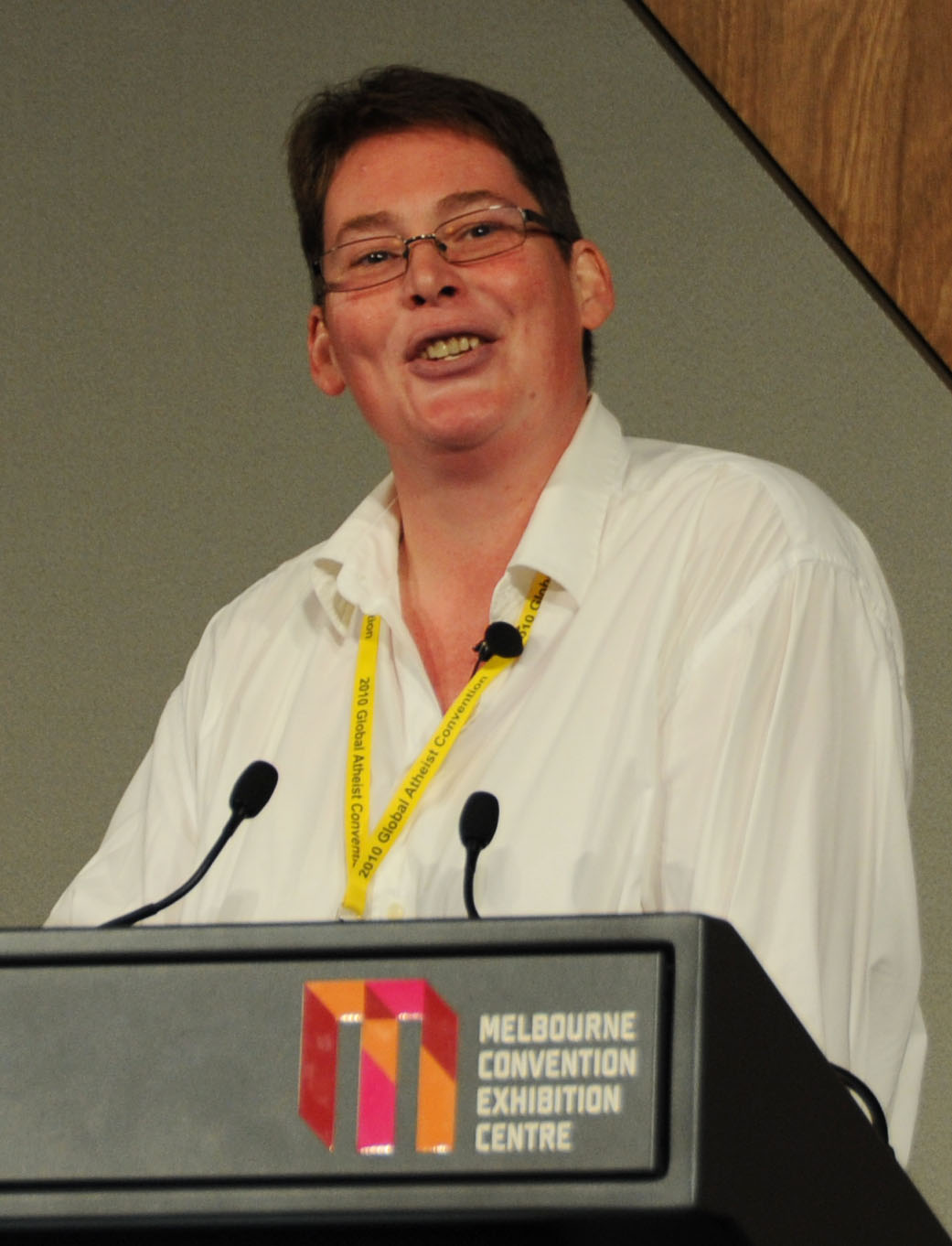
Sue-Ann Post at the 2010 Global Atheist Convention

Sue-Ann Post (born 1964) is an Australian comedian and writer.

Self described as "Australia's favourite six-foot, lesbian, ex-Mormon, diabetic, comedian and writer", Post has performed as a stand-up comedian internationally and throughout Australia since 1991.

Her debut stand-up show, A Bit of a Postscript (1991), toured internationally and received awards at the Melbourne Fringe and Wellington Arts Festivals. The show was later adapted into a book. Before her career in entertainment, she held various positions as a shelf stacker, housemaid, shop assistant, printer's assistant, and wood splitter.

She has written an autobiography A Bit of a Postscript (1997) and a book The Confession of an Unrepentant Lesbian Ex-Mormon (2005) which is about her journey to Salt Lake City, Utah, United States, to deliver a talk to a group of Mormon and ex-Mormon gays and lesbians. A documentary about her journey, The Lost Tribe, aired on ABC's Compass (2005).

She wrote a weekly column for the Melbourne Age for three years and was nominated for the 2002 Human Rights and Equal Opportunity Commission's Print Media Award. Her articles have also appeared in the West Australian, the Freethinker (UK) and Versal (The Netherlands).

== Awards ==
- 1999 Barry Award, for G Strings and Jockstraps

== Television ==
In 1997 her original comedy show "An Ordinary Life" was featured on ABC's "The Smallest Room in the House".

Other Television appearances include Outland (2012), Kath & Kim (2004), The Genie from Down Under, (1996), The Bedroom Commandments (2012) The Glass House (2005), The Lost Tribe (2005), Standing Up (1999), The Panel (1999), Mouthing Off (1996), Something Hot Before Bed (1995).

== Personal life and religion ==
Sue-Ann Post's comedy and writings have dealt with religion, sexuality, incest and disability.

As a child, Post attended six hours of church every Sunday for study and worship. But, after her father was killed in the Granville Train crash in 1977, Post suffered incest, realised she was a lesbian and questioned whether God existed. She broke all ties with the church at age 20. A staunch atheist, Post has described religion as being "like going without the lobster in favour of the invisible dessert" and speaks regularly on the topic at events such as the Global Atheist Convention (2010).
