= Women's Beat League =

The Women's Beat League, founded by Felisha Ledesma, Daniela Karina Serna and Alyssa Beers, is an organization based in Portland, Oregon, that provides space for female and non-binary individuals to learn how to DJ and/or produce music in a safe and inclusive environment. Women's Beat League supports skill sharing and equipment sharing through classes, workshops, lectures and events.
