= Hannah Gadsby's Gender Agenda =

- Starring: Hannah Gadsby; Asha Ward; James Tom (Note: Credited as Jes Tom); Alok; Chloe Petts; DeAnne Smith; Krishna Istha; Mx. Dahlia Belle
- Distributed by: Netflix
- Release date: March 5, 2024
- Running time: 75 minutes
- Country: England
- Language: English

Hannah Gadsby's Gender Agenda is a 2024 Netflix stand-up comedy special starring Hannah Gadsby and seven genderqueer comedians: Asha Ward, James Tom (Note: credited as Jes Tom), Alok, Chloe Petts, DeAnne Smith, Krishna Istha and Mx. Dahlia Belle.

The show was filmed in 2024 at the Alexandra Palace Theatre in London, England and debuted on Netflix on March 5, 2024.

== Origins ==
In regards to what Hannah Gadsby was trying to accomplish with the special, they said, "I wanted to help a diversity of voices, so this was my best guess."

== Critical reception ==
NBC News wrote, "During the special, the seven comedians joke about everything from being competitive at the bouquet toss at weddings to the idea that the word cisgender, which refers to someone who is not transgender, is a slur."

The Los Angeles Times said, "So with this latest offering, Gadsby plays ringleader while showcasing incredible genderqueer comedic talent from all over the globe," jokingly referring to lesbian comedian DeAnne Smith as "a weird little guy."

Rachel Kiley of Out magazine wrote "Move over Dave Chappelle; Hannah Gadsby is bringing a new lineup of genderqueer comedians to Netflix! Gender Agenda shines the spotlight on "seven emerging voices" from the comedy scene."
