= Melbourne International Comedy Festival Award =

Annual prize

- Description: Most outstanding comedy act at the festival
- Location: Melbourne
- Country: Australia
- Presented by: Melbourne International Comedy Festival
- Website: www.comedyfestival.com.au

The Melbourne International Comedy Festival Award (formerly the Barry Award and the Stella Award) is an annual prize presented to the most outstanding comedy act at the Melbourne International Comedy Festival.

== History ==
It has been awarded since 1998, when it was introduced as the Stella Award. It was renamed in 2000 in honour of Barry Humphries, and again renamed in 2019 following comments about transgender people by Humphries. It is generally regarded as the most prestigious award of the festival, and the winner receives a trophy and cash prize.

== Winners ==
- 1998: Linda Haggar and Fahey Younger – Miss Itchy's Crème De Menthe Breakfast Show (Australia)
- 1999: Sue-Ann Post - G Strings and Jockstraps (Australia)
- 2000: The Boosh - Arctic Boosh (UK)
- 2001: Brian Munich - Brian Munich & Friends (Australia)
- 2002: Ross Noble - Slacker's Playtime (UK)
- 2003: Mike Wilmot (Canada)
- 2004: Maria Bamford (USA)
- 2005: The Drowsy Drivers - Keating! The Opera (Australia)
- 2006: Demetri Martin - Dr Earnest Parrot Presents Demetri Martin (USA)
- 2007: Daniel Kitson - It's the Fireworks Talking (UK)
- 2008: Nina Conti - Complete and Utter Conti (UK) and Kristen Schaal - As You Have Probably Never Seen Her Before (USA) (Shared)
- 2009: The Pajama Men - Versus vs Versus (USA)
- 2010: Sammy J and Randy (Heath McIvor) - Ricketts Lane (Australia)
- 2011: Russell Kane - Smokescreens and Castles (UK)
- 2012: Dr Brown - Befrdfgth (USA)
- 2013: Rich Hall - [Untitled show] (USA)
- 2014: Denise Scott - Mother Bare (Australia)
- 2015: Sam Simmons - Spaghetti for Breakfast (Australia)
- 2016: Zoe Coombs Marr aka Dave - Trigger Warning (Australia)
- 2017: Hannah Gadsby - Nanette (Australia)
- 2018: Sam Campbell - The Trough (Australia)
- 2019: James Acaster - Cold Lasagne Hate Myself 1999 (UK)
- 2020: Festival cancelled due to COVID-19 pandemic
- 2021: Geraldine Hickey - What a Surprise (Australia)
- 2022: Rhys Nicholson - Rhys! Rhys! Rhys! (Australia)
- 2023: Gillian Cosgriff - Actually, Good (Australia)
- 2024: Sarah Keyworth - My Eyes Are Up Here (UK)
- 2025: Garry Starr – Classic Penguins (Australia)
- 2026: Celia Pacquola - Gift Horse (Australia)
