= Garry Starr =

Australian comedian

Garry Starr, the stage name of Australian performer Damien Warren-Smith, is a comedian known for his one-man clown shows including "Garry Starr: Classic Penguins", in which he purports to stage every book of the Penguin classics in 70 minutes while completely naked besides a tailcoat, a top hat, and white Elizabethan ruff.

== Performances ==
Starr's has performed a range of shows covering many genres of performance. In one of his shows, he covered the breadth of Greek mythology.

=== Classic Penguins ===
Since 2024, Starr has performed a 70-minute stage show "Classic Penguins", which has had direction from Cal McCrystal and production by Francesca Moody. In both 2024 and 2026, “Classic Penguins” was a buzzy hit at the Edinburgh Festival Fringe, with the 2026 performances at the very large Pleasance Grand venue.

In the show, Starr claims to be a half-penguin creature intent on preventing the death of literature. In Starr's worldview, each of the works published by Penguin Books were written by actual penguins. To save these written works from falling into obscurity, he performs brief and often absurd performances of them. For example, while displaying a copy of Dracula on a document projector, he puts on fangs and chugs "several liters" of tomato juice. When The Grapes of Wrath is displayed, he invites an audience volunteer on stage and instigates an explosive fight in which they throw grapes at each other. For Wuthering Heights, a rope descends from the ceiling and he uses it to swing himself over the audiences' heads, as an audience member holds a leaf blower at him to illustrate wuthering. Starr stages Moby Dick by playing a song by Moby and dancing, in the words of The New York Times, "pendulously".

In The New York Times, theater critic Helen Shaw called it an "explosively silly one-penguin show" and called nudity "both the content and moral of the night", noting his use of his genitals as not only a costume but a prop: "he dangles, he sproings, he helicopters". Shaw compared it to props like Charlie Chaplin's small cane and Groucho Marx's cigar. Starr is praised for his warm and inviting presence, and his use of "sausage" as a term of endearment for audience volunteers.
