= Hannah Gadsby =

Australian comedian, writer, actor (born 1978)

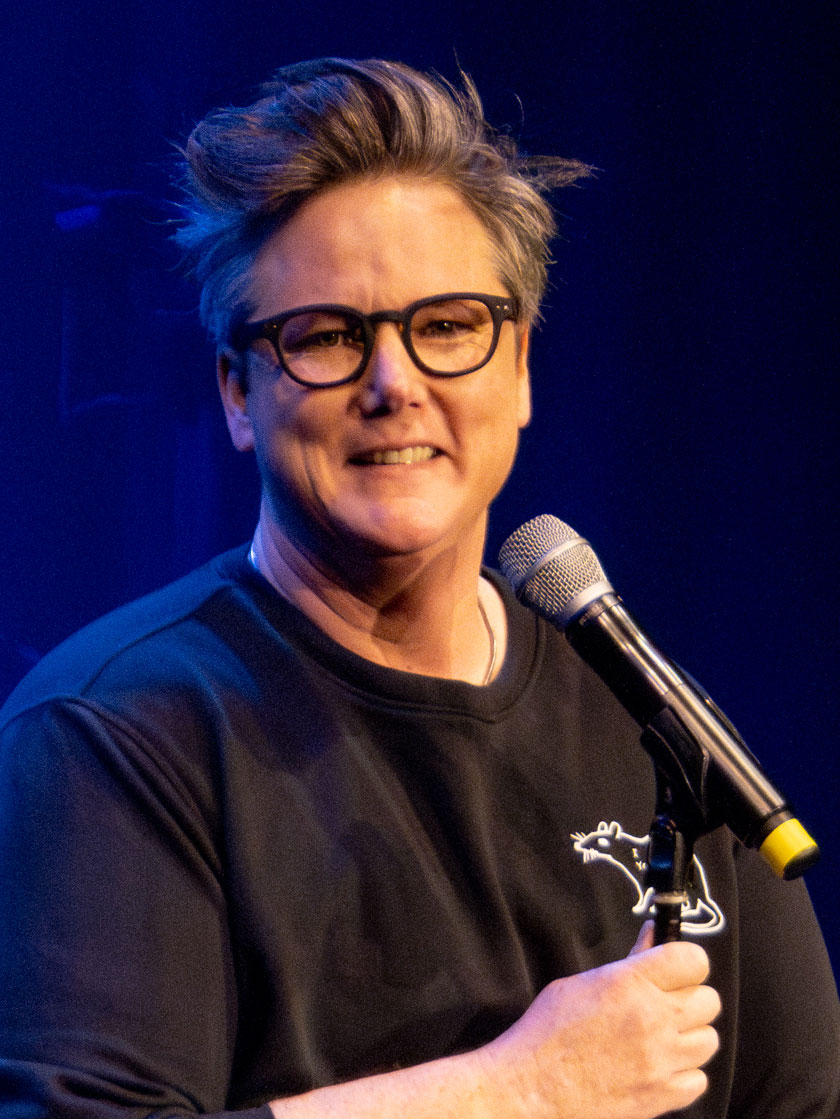
- Gadsby in 2024
- Born: 12 January 1978 (age 48); Burnie, Tasmania, Australia
- Education: University of Tasmania; Australian National University (BA)
- Spouse: Jenney Shamash (m. 2021)

Comedy career
- Years active: 2006–present
- Medium: Stand-up; television; theatre
- Genres: Observational comedy; dark humour; deadpan; wit
- Subjects: Art history; dysfunctional family; homosexuality; homophobia; mental illness; misandry; misogyny; trauma; autism; ADHD
- Website: www.hannahgadsby.com.au

Hannah Gadsby (born 12 January 1978) is an Australian comedian, writer and actor. They began their career in Australia after winning the national final of the Raw Comedy competition for new comedians in 2006. In 2018, their show Nanette on Netflix won the Primetime Emmy Award for Outstanding Writing for a Variety Special and a Peabody Award.

Starting in 2019, Gadsby toured internationally with their show Douglas and the recorded special was released on Netflix in 2020. In March 2022, their book Ten Steps to Nanette: A Memoir Situation was published. They appeared as a recurring cast member in season four of Netflix's Sex Education as Celia, a radio show host.

== Early life ==
Autism diagnosis

My meltdowns had always been a mystery to me, so when I was finally diagnosed, I was able to reframe the way I thought about my strange little outbursts. For a start, I became far more compassionate toward myself, which probably halved the distress of the occasions.

— Hannah Gadsby, The Guardian, 19 March 2022

Gadsby was born on January 12, 1978, at North West Regional Hospital in Burnie, Tasmania. They grew up in Smithton, a small town on the remote north-west coast of Tasmania, as the youngest of five children. Gadsby attended Smithton High School from 1990 to 1995. In year 12, Gadsby attended Launceston College, where they had a nervous breakdown. They began studying at the University of Tasmania in Hobart transferred to the Australian National University, where they earned a bachelor's degree in art history and curatorship in 2003.

Gadsby worked in bookshops in Canberra and became a projectionist at an outdoor cinema in Darwin. They spent two years picking vegetables and planting trees along the east coast of Australia. Gadsby became unhoused, which they later attributed in part to their ADHD, and ill enough with acute pancreatitis to require hospitalisation.

== Career ==
=== Stand-up comedy ===
On a visit to their sister in Adelaide in 2006, Gadsby entered Raw Comedy, progressing through the heats to win the national prize. As the winner, they were sent to the So You Think You're Funny? competition at the Edinburgh Fringe Festival, where they won second prize. Their first solo show was titled Hannah Gadsby is Wrong and Broken, and won the 2007 Best Newcomer Award at the Edinburgh Fringe Festival before they went on tour with the show in Edinburgh and New York. In 2008, they performed Meat the Musical with Amelia Jane Hunter at the Melbourne International Comedy Festival. They continued to perform at festivals, including the Melbourne International Comedy Festival, Kilkenny Comedy Festival, Montreal Just for Laughs Festival, Edinburgh Fringe Festival and New Zealand International Comedy Festival. In September 2022, Gadsby signed a multi-title deal with Netflix.

==== Nanette ====
Gadsby created the stand-up show Nanette, partly as a response to the public debate which took place in Australia before the law was changed to allow same-sex marriage, and also after their diagnosis of autism. Nanette explores topics such as homophobia, xenophobia, sexism, and gendered violence. Elahe Izadi of The Washington Post states although Nanette is a comedy, Gadsby insists the audience recognize the dark truth of trauma and assault. During the show, Gadsby says they are quitting comedy.

In a review for Time Out of their next show Douglas, Ben Neutze wrote, "Yes, it was funny, but Gadsby's main objective was to deliver a fiery and furious takedown of the heterosexual patriarchy." According to Mary Luckhurst, writing in Persona Studies, Gadsby's "stand-up has to be set against the epidemic of gender-based violence which continues to infect Australian life and which was declared a 'national crisis' by the Federal Government in 2015."

After Gadsby won the Melbourne International Comedy Festival Barry award, the Edinburgh Festival Fringe Comedy Award, and the Helpmann Award for Best Comedy Performer, Netflix released the film version of Nanette in 2018. On Rotten Tomatoes, Nanette received an approval rating of 100% based on reviews from 49 critics.

==== Douglas ====
In March 2019, Gadsby previewed their show, Douglas, in Adelaide, before touring the U.S. and Australia, where many shows were sold out in advance. In the show, they explore personal revelations "with empathy, wit and some extremely relatable metaphor", and create something "bigger than comedy" according to one reviewer of the preview show. In Douglas, they discuss their autism diagnosis, aiming to help people understand neurodiversity as part of a normal variation of the human condition. In a review of the show for Time Out, Anne-Marie Peard wrote, "Douglas will create change and help people, especially undiagnosed women, to see that they may not have the right words to describe how they experience life; it's describing that experience to those who still say or think the words that belittle and damage." In 2020, Netflix released a filmed version of the live show.

==== Body of Work ====
In July 2021, Gadsby started a solo show, title Body of Work in several venues in Australia, New Zealand, Europe, and the UK. Dates were also announced in the United States. A review of Body of Work for The Guardian by Brian Logan describes the show as "a winning return for Gadsby, to whose heavy-hitting accomplishments can now be added a flair for comedy with a light heart." In 2022, Netflix announced its plans to release a recording from the Body of Work tour in 2023. In April 2023, Netflix announced the television special about this tour was going to be titled Something Special. On May 10 2023, the show was released on Netflix.

==== Gender Agenda ====
In February 2024, Gadsby announced a comedy special on 5 March on Netflix, Hannah Gadsby's Gender Agenda, by seven genderqueer comics: James Tom, Alok, Asha Ward, Chloe Petts, DeAnne Smith, Krishna Istha and Mx. Dahlia Belle.

=== TV roles ===
Gadsby co-wrote and co-starred in the Australian ABC TV show Adam Hills Tonight through three seasons from February 2011 to July 2013. They had regular segments called "On This Day" and "Hannah Has A Go" and also featured on the couch, contributing as host Adam Hills interviewed his guests. They co-wrote (with Matthew Bate) and presented a three-part series on ABC, Hannah Gadsby's Oz, which aired in March 2014. Produced by Closer Productions, this series set out to "debunk the myths of the Australian identity perpetuated by [its] national art". From 2013 to 2016, they co-wrote 20 episodes of the television series Please Like Me with fellow comedian Josh Thomas. In it, they played Hannah, a fictional version of themself. They appeared as a recurring cast member in season four of Netflix's Sex Education as Celia, a radio show producer.

Gadsby's Australian and international television appearances include Rove Live (2009), Good News Week (2009), Spicks and Specks (2010), Agony Aunts (2012), QI (2018), The Tonight Show Starring Jimmy Fallon (2018, 2020), and TV3's game show, 7 Days. They were a presenter at the 70th Primetime Emmy Awards in 2018, presenting the award for Outstanding Directing for a Drama Series. Gadsby was also a guest on Conan O'Brien's podcast Conan O'Brien Needs a Friend in 2019.

== Other ventures ==
=== Art exhibitions ===
Between 2009 and 2013, Gadsby presented comedy art tours in conjunction with the National Gallery of Victoria, with themes such as paintings of the Holy Virgin, Dadaism, Modernism, Impressionism and the nude in art. They have given talks on art and opened exhibitions. Gadsby has written and presented two documentary specials for the Artscape program on ABC TV: Hannah Gadsby Goes Domestic (2010) and The NGV Story (2011). In 2015, they wrote and performed Hannah Gadsby: Arts Clown, a series for BBC Radio 4 based on their comedy art shows.

From June through September 2023, coinciding with the fiftieth anniversary of Pablo Picasso's death, the Brooklyn Museum hosted It's Pablo-matic: Picasso According to Hannah Gadsby. The exhibition, curated by Gadsby, was meant to explore Picasso's "complicated legacy through a critical, contemporary, and feminist lens, even as it acknowledges his work's transformative power and lasting influence". It was co-curated with Catherine Morris of the Elizabeth A. Sackler Center for Feminist Art and Lisa Small of the Brooklyn Museum. The show was lambasted by art critics; Alex Greenberger of ARTnews called the show "disastrous", and Jason Farago of The New York Times commented, "if you thought Gadsby had something to say about Picasso, the joke — the only good joke of the day, in fact — is on you. [...] This new exhibition backs away from close looking for the affirmative comforts of social-justice-themed pop culture."

=== Memoir ===
In March 2022, Gadsby's book Ten Steps to Nanette: A Memoir Situation was published. The book was a New York Times bestseller and is published in more than ten languages.

The audiobook version is read by Gadsby, and was an April 2022 Earphones Award Winner, and was a finalist for the Audie Award for Narration by the Author category in the 2023 Audie Awards. The AudioFile Magazine review of the audiobook states that Gadsby "delivers this audiobook in the same way [they perform] on stage, demonstrating a mastery of expression and pacing that allows [their] words and stories to have maximum impact."

A review in Time by Trish Bendix stated the book "addresses the weighted issues of historical gender-based violence, misogyny, sexual abuse, homophobia, ableism and fatphobia, all of which Gadsby has directly experienced", and that Gadsby wrote, "I am triggering all the warnings." Kirkus Reviews described the memoir as a "witty and provocatively written life story" and wrote, "Consistently self-effacing and contemplative, Gadsby acknowledges that [their] unique brand of deadpan observational comedy isn't for everyone, especially since it often skewers 'the two most overly sensitive demographics the world has ever known: straight white cis men and self-righteous comedians.'"

Thomas Floyd wrote in a review for The Washington Post, "For a comic critiqued by some misguided souls as not being funny enough, Gadsby sure understands how to get the last laugh." Publishers Weekly wrote, "This stirring tale of resilience laughs in the face of the 'inspiration porn' industry." Dana Dunham wrote for the Chicago Review of Books that Gadsby "describes Nanette's inception, its iterations, and its careful layering, representing [their] thinking in actual images of [their] early notes and through artistic metaphor: the shapes of ideas, the palette of thoughts. Any artist, any creator should value the chance to examine the composition of this revolutionary work, and the context from which it came."

== Personal life ==
Gadsby is lesbian and often includes LGBTQ-related themes in their stand-up routines. They are genderqueer and use they/them pronouns. In the introduction to the program 'Gender Agenda', Gadsby says:

I haven't picked a team. 'Gender-fluid', but also.... 'Non-binary' works, kind of, in theory, but the term 'non-binary' distresses me. Because to define yourself by something you are not... is the cornerstone of binary thinking. If I was to make up a gender for myself, it would be 'gender-surprised', because it doesn't matter how people gender me. Because I get the whole set everyday. She/her, he/him, they/them, every day. And none of them offend me, but all of them surprise me. Every interaction with a stranger is a tiny gender reveal party for me.

Gadsby was diagnosed with ADHD and autism in 2017.

In January 2021, Gadsby married producer Jenney Shamash.

Gadsby is an active supporter of various charities. Organisations they have assisted include Big Brothers Big Sisters of Melbourne, Edmund Rice Camps of Victoria, and the Sacred Heart Mission.

== Awards ==
- 2006: Melbourne International Comedy Festival Raw Comedy winner
- 2006: Edinburgh Festival Fringe, So You Think You're Funny? – Second place
- 2007: Adelaide Fringe, Best Newcomer Award for Hannah Gadsby is Wrong and Broken
- 2010: Helpmann Award for Best Comedy Performer – nominee for The Cliff Young Shuffle
- 2010: Melbourne International Comedy Festival – Directors' Choice Award
- 2011: Helpmann Award for Best Comedy Performer – nominee for Mrs Chuckles
- 2011: Melbourne International Comedy Festival Barry Award nominee
- 2017: Helpmann Award for Best Comedy Performer for Nanette
- 2017: Melbourne International Comedy Festival, Barry Award winner for Nanette
- 2017: Edinburgh Festival Fringe Comedy Award – joint winner for Nanette, tied with John Robins for The Darkness of Robins
- 2017: Adelaide Fringe Best Comedy Award
- 2018: 7th AACTA International Awards Best Comedy Program – nominee
- 2018: AACTA Award for Best Performance in a Television Comedy
- 2019: Helpmann Award for Best Comedy Performer for Douglas
- 2019: MTV Movie & TV Awards – nominee for Best Real-Life Hero
- 2019: Peabody Award for Nanette
- 2019: Primetime Emmy Award for Outstanding Writing for a Variety Special – winner for Nanette
- 2020: Primetime Emmy Award for Outstanding Writing for a Variety Special – nominee for Douglas
- 2021: Honorary Doctorate, Doctor of Literature honoris causa, awarded by the University of Tasmania, in recognition of their role as "an ambassador for all LGBTIQ+ people world-wide"
- 2023: Audie Award for Narration by the Author – finalist for audiobook Ten Steps to Nanette: A Memoir Situation

== Tours ==
- Kiss Me Quick I'm Full of Jubes (2009)
- The Cliff Young Shuffle (2010)
- Mrs Chuckles (2011)
- Hannah Wants a Wife (2012)
- Happiness Is a Bedside Table (2013)
- The Exhibitionist (2014)
- Dogmatic (2015)
- Donkey (2016)
- Nanette (2017–2018)
- Douglas (2019)
- Body of Work (2021–2022)
- Woof! (2024)

== Filmography ==
=== Television ===
Year	Title	Role	Notes
2009–2010	The Librarians	Carmel	2 episodes
2011	Warehouse Comedy Festival	Self	Episode: "Hannah Gadsby: Kiss Me Quick, I'm Full of Jubes"
2012-2014	The Agony of...	Self	20 episodes
2011–2013	Adam Hills Tonight	Self	Presenter in 36 episodes. Co-writer in 24 episodes.
2013	Warehouse Comedy Festival	Self	Episode: "Hannah Gadsby: Mrs Chuckles"
2013	Underbelly: Squizzy	Charlie	3 episodes
2014	Hannah Gadsby's Oz	Host	Documentary mini-series (3 episodes); Also writer; produced by Rebecca Summerton
2014–2016	Please Like Me	Hannah	Also co-writer
2015	Hannah Gadsby: Renaissance Woman	Host	Also writer and producer
2018	Hannah Gadsby's Nakedy Nudes	Host	Documentary mini-series Also writer
2018	QI	Self - Panellist	Series 16 Episode 6 Pictures
2023	Sex Education	Celia	Recurring role
2023	Queerstralia	Self	Documentary. Episode 1.
2024	Outstanding: A Comedy Revolution	Self	Documentary written and directed by Page Hurwitz
2025	Guy Montgomery's Guy Mont-Spelling Bee	Self - Panellist	

=== Film ===
Year	Title	Role	Notes
2018	Hannah Gadsby: Nanette	Self	Comedy special
2020	Hannah Gadsby: Douglas	Self	Comedy special
2023	Hannah Gadsby: Something Special	Self	Comedy special
2024	Gender Agenda	Self	Comedy special
2024	Hitpig!	Lola (voice)	Animated film

== Bibliography ==
- Gadsby, Hannah (2022). Ten Steps to Nanette. Sydney: Allen & Unwin. ISBN 978-1-742-37403-1. OCLC 1014018703.
