= Hannah Gadsby: Nanette =

2017 stand-up comedy act by Hannah Gadsby

- Directed by: Madeleine Parry; John Olb
- Written by: Hannah Gadsby
- Starring: Hannah Gadsby
- Distributed by: Netflix
- Release date: 2018
- Running time: 69 minutes
- Country: Australia
- Language: English

Hannah Gadsby: Nanette is a live comedy performance written and performed by Australian comedian Hannah Gadsby, which debuted in 2017. The work includes social commentary, punctuated by comedy and emotive narration of Gadsby's life, lessons and what their story offers to the world. In June 2018, Netflix released a video of Gadsby's performance of the work at the Sydney Opera House, directed by Madeleine Parry and John Olb. The special was well received by critics, winning a Peabody Award as well as Outstanding Writing for a Variety Special at the 2019 Primetime Emmy Awards.

== Development ==
Gadsby created the stand-up show Nanette partly as a response to the public debate which took place in Australia before the law was changed to allow same-sex marriage, and soon after their diagnoses of ADHD and autism.

The show was originally named after a woman Gadsby had met, who they thought could be turned into an hour's worth of material. During the writing process, they realized this wasn't the case, but the name had already been chosen. They ended up ignoring this inconsistency and wrote an hour of material unrelated to Nanette. The initial shows were more combative with the audience, and made Gadsby feel victimised, despite being the aggressor, so to get the audience more on their side, they added more jokes and relieved more tension throughout the show's run.

== Synopsis ==
Gadsby uses Nanette to deconstruct the nature of comedy and its conventions by having the audience undergo the same tension in which marginalised people suffer on a daily basis. Gadsby shares personal anecdotes related to Gadsby's experiences as a lesbian and gender-nonconforming person, explaining how their comedic style is influenced by their identity. Gadsby was raised in conservative Tasmania surrounded by people prejudiced towards LGBTQ people. To deal with the social inequality Gadsby faced, Gadsby had earlier in their career turned to self-deprecating humour. They later realised the self-deprecating humour common to standup comedy is doubly painful for marginalised people because it adds another voice to the chorus of people who already insult and belittle the comedian. This led Gadsby to decide to quit standup comedy and so they structured the Nanette piece around explaining that decision.

In addition to the stories shared about their lesbian and gender-nonconforming experiences, Gadsby relates personal stories about their comedy career, family, and university experiences among other things. Gadsby expresses the need to use stories in their comedy because they are frustrated with the form of standup comedy. They do not feel as if their story, because their identity and victimisation do not fit comfortably into society's narrative, is being listened to properly. The representation of their story through Nanette affords Gadsby hope their experiences will be "felt and understood by individuals with minds of their own," and that Gadsby's story will finally be heard.

Gadsby discusses the mental health of Vincent van Gogh. Later, they talk about Pablo Picasso's contributions to Cubism and how they regard him as a misogynist artist.

== Performances ==
Gadsby has performed Nanette throughout Australia, at the Edinburgh Festival Fringe, and in the United States. Their 2018 performances in New York City received positive reviews. The show was performed for the final time on 27 July 2018, in Montreal. On 20 June 2018, Netflix released a film of Gadsby's performance of the work at the Sydney Opera House under the title Hannah Gadsby: Nanette.

== Reception ==
On review aggregator Rotten Tomatoes, the film has an approval rating of 100% based on 48 reviews, with an average rating of 9.2/10. The site's critical consensus reads: "Hannah Gadsby: Nanette brilliantly moves modern comedy into nakedly honest new territory, pivoting from dry humor to raw, powerful storytelling." The performance has been described as a "game changer" for what comedy can achieve and has been called a form of "post comedy."

Daniel Fienberg of The Hollywood Reporter stated "Hannah Gadsby's Nanette stands alone...It's a detailed summation of joke construction that could be a textbook on its own. It's an art history lesson. It's hilarious, because Gadsby's timing and perspective fuel every sentence. It's painful, because Gadsby's emotions and perspective fuel every sentence." Ashley Hoffman in Time listed Nanette as the Best Stand Up Comedy Special of 2018, and added "Nanette kickstarted a global conversation, ensuring that underrepresented perspective was finally seen and heard—and when Gadsby wrenches out pain on stage, reveals strength, rage, and yes, winning humor."

Anna Leszkiewicz in the New Statesman voiced praise for Nanette: "Gadsby's show is a tricksy, self-conscious beast, full of sleight of hand... It is a strange, rare thing: a comedy show that hopes you don't leave laughing." Brian Logan of The Guardian helps to explain the significance and allure of Nanette by reporting Gadsby's "show is about the power of stories and how, if the stories we tell ourselves are simplified or smoothed over, we leave unchallenged the wider stories society tells itself (in this case, about gender, sexuality and power)."

Helen Razer, writing in The Saturday Paper, wrote that Nanette "is very good...It is a worthy and well-paced specimen of a long-established form." However, Razer also added that she believed some American reviewers of Nanette had overpraised the show, saying "We cannot say that Gadsby’s Nanette definitively prescribes a style or ethics of remembering trauma. We can say that it's pretty good."

By contrast, in The Outline magazine, P.E. Moskowitz gave Nanette a negative review, arguing that the special "makes for boring, trite, and even dangerous art: in order to convey [their] trauma, Gadsby dismisses all of comedy, the uses of queer anger, and the entire premise of self-deprecation as inadequate". In The Baffler, Soraya Roberts writes, "In terms of overall quality, Nanette is mediocre," and "While other high profile comedians take a break from standup to give TED Talks, Gadsby's special erodes the separation between the two, down to the oversized, antiseptic set and the comic's persistently neutral affect, physically restrained, with a voice that often sounds like a soothingly patronizing life coach."

=== Accolades ===
The show received critical acclaim, including a 2018 Peabody Award.

| Award Ceremony | Date of ceremony | Category | Result | Ref. |
|---|---|---|---|---|
| Melbourne International Comedy Festival Award | 22 April 2017 | Barry Award (for comedy) | Won | |
| Helpmann Awards | 24 July 2017 | Best Comedy Performer | Won | |
| Edinburgh Comedy Awards | July 2017 | Best Comedy Show | Won | |
| Adelaide Fringe | 28 August 2017 | Best Comedy Award | Won | |
| 7th AACTA International Awards | 5 January 2018 | Best Comedy Program | Nominated | |
| 7th AACTA International Awards | 5 January 2018 | Best Performance in a Television Comedy | Won | |
| Peabody Award | 18 May 2019 | Peabody 30 | Won | |
| MTV Movie & TV Awards | June 2019 | Best Real-Life Hero | Nominated | |
| Primetime Emmy Awards | September 2019 | Outstanding Writing for a Variety Special | Won | |
| Primetime Emmy Awards | September 2019 | Outstanding Variety Special (Pre-Recorded) | Nominated | |
