= DeAnne Smith =

Canadian and American comedian, writer, and columnist

- Born: July 22, 1979 (age 47); Endicott, New York, United States

Comedy career
- Years active: 2005–present
- Medium: Live performance, television, radio, writing
- Genre: Stand-up comedy
- Website: deannesmith.com

DeAnne Smith (born July 22, 1979) is a Canadian and American comedian, writer and columnist. They first gained notice as a comedian in 2008 touring their debut full-length solo stand-up show to popular and critical acclaim, culminating in winning the Sydney Comedy Festival's Time Out Best Newcomer Award and a nomination for Best Newcomer in the 2008 Canadian Comedy Awards. Smith has since continued to tour internationally, with shows proving to be both commercial and critical successes. Their shows have seen them nominated for numerous awards, including the Melbourne Comedy Festival's prestigious Barry Award in 2011 and being consistently rated amongst Montreal's Top 10 comedians. In addition to their live solo shows, Smith is also known for appearances on television and radio, most notably on Australia's Good News Week on the Channel 10 network and HBO series Funny As Hell.

Smith began performing stand-up in 2005 at the age of 25, and has produced four solo shows which have toured internationally. Smith has also created and hosts four live comedy show series in Montreal, and co-wrote a show with Sarah Quinn and Samuel Booth which made its festival debut in 2011.

Smith is agender and uses they/them pronouns.

== Career ==
In March 2024, Smith appeared in a Netflix comedy special, Hannah Gadsby's Gender Agenda, hosted by Hannah Gadsby and featuring several other genderqueer comedians.

=== Festival appearances ===
- 2011, 2012 – Edinburgh Fringe Festival; Edinburgh
- 2007, 2009, 2010, 2011, 2012, 2013, 2014 – Just for Laughs; Montreal
- 2010, 2011, 2012, 2013 – Melbourne International Comedy Festival
- 2009, 2010, 2011, 2012 – Melbourne International Comedy Festival Roadshow
- 2008, 2009, 2010, 2011, 2012 – Sydney Comedy Festival
- 2008, 2009, 2010, 2011, 2012, 2013 – Adelaide Fringe Festival
- 2012 – Perth International Comedy Festival; Perth
- 2012 – Brisbane Comedy Festival; Brisbane
- 2010 – Hobart Comedy Festival

=== Media appearances ===
Smith was rated amongst Montreal's Top 10 Comedians over five years in the 2010s, ranking #3 in 2010–2012, and #4 from 2007 to 2009. as reported in The Montreal Mirror, which also named them a Noisemaker in 2009. Smith regularly appears on television and radio in Canada and Australia. Their radio appearances, include Australia's ABC, Triple J, and Canada's CBC Radio One, where they have appeared as a regular on Definitely Not the Opera, and The Debaters. In 2012 they appeared on British TV for the first time, on Morgan Spurlock's Sky Atlantic programme New Britannia.

- 2013 – The Late Late Show with Craig Ferguson; CBS, US
- 2012 – New Britannia; Sky Atlantic, Britain
- 2012 – Melbourne International Comedy Festival Opening Night Gala for Oxfam; Channel Ten, Australia
- 2011 – Funny As Hell; HBO, Canada
- 2009, 2010, 2011 – Good News Week; Channel Ten, Australia
- 2009 – The Comedy Network, Canada
- 2007, 2014 – Last Comic Standing; NBC, US

=== Solo shows ===
- 2013 – DeAnne Smith: Let's Do This!
- 2012 – DeAnne Smith: Livin' the Sweet Life
- 2011 – DeAnne Smith: The Best DeAnne Smith DeAnne Smith Can Be
- 2011 – About Freakin' Time
- 2010 – DeAnne Smith: BALLSY
- 2009 – DeAnne Smith Lacks Focus
- 2008 – Shouting Over Drunks

== Other work ==
=== Creator and host ===
- 2010–present – Happenglad's New Hat
- 2010–present – Freedom Nation
- 2008–present – Stand Up / Strip Down
- 2008–2010 – Tale Spin!
- 2005 – 2009 – Comedy OFF the Main

=== Co-writer ===
- 2011 – Sarah Quinn in Other People's Problems; with Sarah Quinn and Samuel Booth

=== Podcasts ===
- 2013–2016 – DeAnne Smith's Questionable at Best

== Awards ==
- 2012 – Edinburgh Fringe Festival – Amused Moose Top Ten; shortlisted
- 2011 – Canadian Comedy Awards – Best Female Stand-Up; nominated
- 2011 – Melbourne International Comedy Festival – Barry Award for Most Outstanding Comedy Show; nominated
- 2009 – Adelaide Fringe Festival – Best Established Comedian; nominated
- 2008 – Canadian Comedy Awards – Best Newcomer; nominated
- 2008 – Sydney Comedy Festival – Time Out Best Newcomer; won

== Personal life ==
While hosting Comedy Up Late at the Melbourne International Comedy Festival 2017, DeAnne described themself as agender.
