= Postlethwaite =

- Pronunciation: /ˈpɒsəlθweɪt/ POSS-əl-thwayt
- Language: English

Origin
- Derivation: Postlethwaite (a placename in Cumbria)
- Meaning: 'Postle's (small) farm'

Postlethwaite is an English surname. Notable people with the surname include:

- Billy Postlethwaite (born 1989), English actor
- Claire Postlethwaite, New Zealand mathematician
- Harvey Postlethwaite (1944–1999), British Formula One engineer
- Jane Postlethwaite, British comedian
- Jude Postlethwaite (born 2002), Irish rugby union player
- Lily Postlethwaite (born 2001), Australian rules footballer
- Matt Postlethwaite (born 1996), English rugby union player
- Matthew Postlethwaite (born 1991), British actor
- Pete Postlethwaite (1946–2011), British actor
- Thomas Postlethwaite (1731–1798), English mathematician
- William Postlethwaite (1829–1908), New Zealand politician

== See also ==
- James Postlethwaite, a schooner
- Malachy Postlethwayt (1707–1767), British commercial expert and specialist lexicologist
- Kathy Postlewait (born 1949), American golfer
