= Funny Women =

Female comedy network

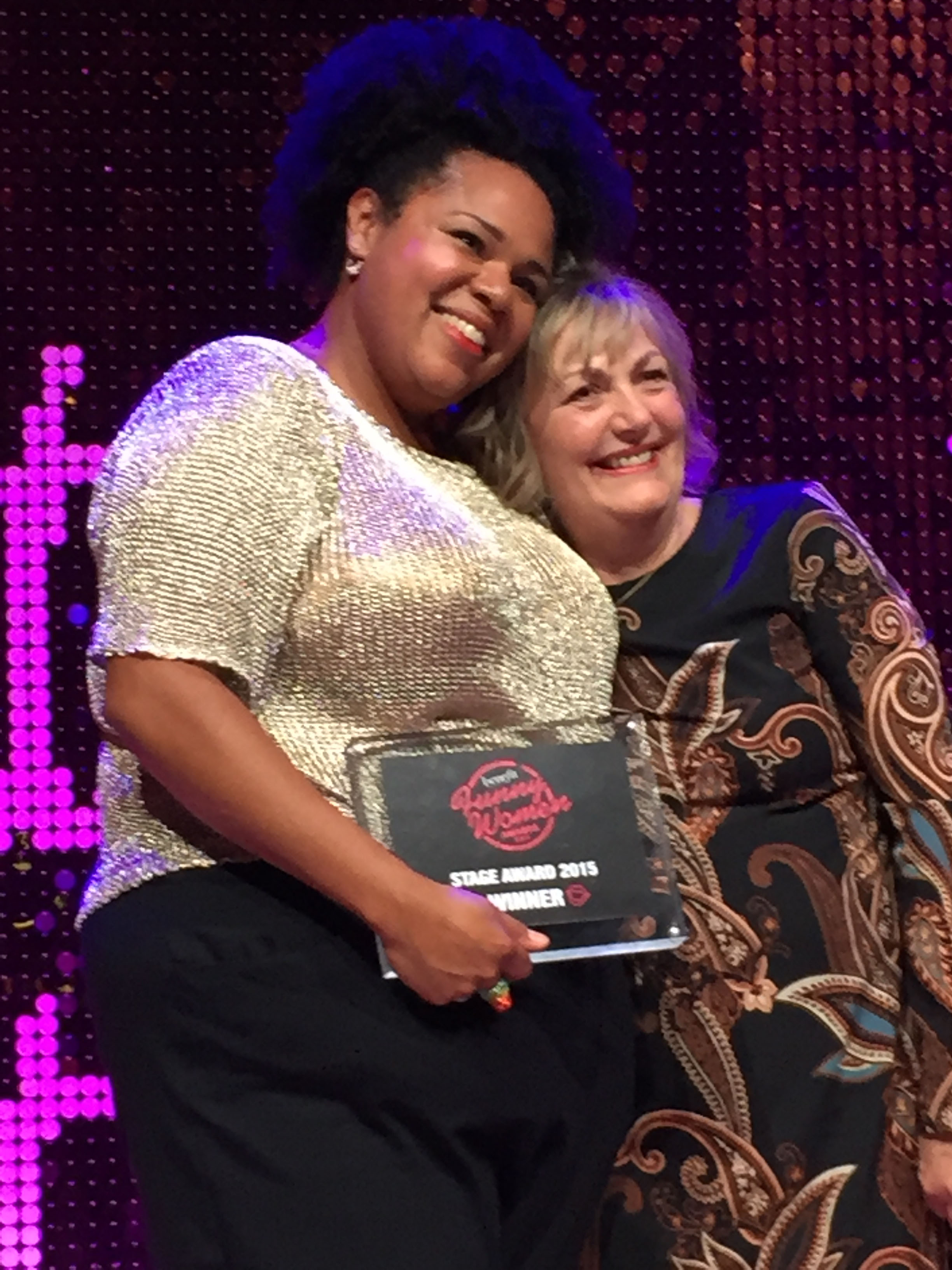
Desiree Burch gaining the award in 2015 (with Lynne Parker)

Funny Women is an online and in-person workshop community dedicated to the support of female comedians. It was founded by Lynne Parker in 2002 as a reaction to misogynistic comments from a comedy promoter. Funny Women helps women find their voice, promote them, and assists charities.

During the 2019 Funny Women Awards Final, Funny Women announced that their new Patron (renamed Matron), would be Jo Brand.

== Live events ==
Funny Women runs "Stand Up to Stand Out" comedy workshops hosted by Parker.

In 2013, Funny Women hosted the first Workshop Weekend at the women-only business club B.Hive in Covent Garden. This comprised two days of intensive comedy and confidence training, including a Stand-Up to Stand Out comedy workshop run by Lynne Parker, an improvisation workshop facilitated by Courtney Cornfield, writing for radio hosted by Paul Dodgson and character creation with Hattie Naylor.

Funny Women also hosts regular comedy showcases in London and Brighton; residencies include comedy venues at the Leicester Square Theatre and Komedia. Following a successful trial at the Richmond Literature Festival, Funny Women is now also branching out into literary festivals with a new format discussing writing female comedy with a panel of writers and performers.

== Website ==
The Funny Women website contains a ‘magazine’ containing opinion pieces, podcast reviews & recommendations. It also contains live show critiques and actively encourages submissions from budding writers wanting to sharpen their comedy writing skills. They also offer feedback and help develop writers.

== The Funny Women Awards ==
The Funny Women Awards were launched in 2003. Contestants include female talents such as Bridget Christie, Susan Calman, Katherine Ryan, Andi Osho, Kerry Godliman, Sara Pascoe, Zoe Lyons, Holly Walsh and Sarah Millican.

The Awards have attracted national television and radio coverage (Richard & Judy, This Morning, The Culture Show), and national press (The Guardian, The Times, The Telegraph). The Awards have also been featured as a series of podcasts with The Sun (semi final, final), and footage from the 2007 final at the Comedy Store, London is featured on the Paramount Comedy website.

Due to the numbers entering, this competition has three stages. Heats take place over April, May and June and from these heats, 20 acts are selected. Four semi-finals are held in Brighton, Manchester, London and Edinburgh and from these, ten acts are selected to go through to the final. Previous venues include Leicester Square Theatre and Kings Place in London.

It was announced at the 2019 Funny Women Awards that Jo Brand would be the Patron of Funny Women. The prize for the Stage Award 2019 would include mentoring from Brand.

=== 2025 ===
==== Stage Award Finalists ====
- ‘Zoe’ Nicola Mantalios (Winner)
- Madeleine Brettingham (Runner-up)
- Maple Zuo (Runner-up)
- Kate Hammer
- Kay Nicholson
- Rachel Galvo
- Samantha Day
- Shalaka Kurup
- Sharifa Butterfly
- Sophie Garrad

=== 2023 ===
==== Stage Award Finalists ====
- Kate Cheka (Winner)
- Hannah Platt (Runner-up)
- Victoria Comedy (Runner-up)
- Blank Peng
- Charlie Vero-Martin
- Nikola McMurtrie
- Rachel Baker
- Sascha LO
- Su Mi
- Tal Davies

==== Content Creator Award ====
- Serena Terry (Winner)
- Soph Galustian (Runner-up)
- Nerine Skinner (Runner-up)

=== 2022 ===
==== Stage Award ====
- Lorna Rose Treen (winner)
- Marjolein Robertson (2nd)
- Jessie Nixon (3rd)
- Anshita Koul (finalist)
- Fathiya Saleh (finalist)
- Julia Stenton (finalist)
- Kate Martin (finalist)
- Leah Davis (finalist)
- Sharlin Jahan (finalist)
- Tatty Macleod (finalist)

==== Comedy Writing Award ====
- Ruby Carr (winner)
- Nicki Lucas (finalist)
- Ellie Silver (finalist)

==== Comedy Shorts Award ====
- Lorna Rose Treen (winner)
- Lorelei Mathias (finalist)
- Sarah Grant & Katrina Allen (finalist)

==== Industry Award ====
- Amy Annette (winner)
- Anna Leong Brophy (finalist)
- Hannah George (finalist)

==== Content Creator Award ====
- Chan Wills (Chanel Williams) (winner)
- Anne Crowther (Christiana Brockbank)
- Bluenbroke (Kate Harding)
- Cocosarel
- Castmeimjane (Jane Postlethwaite)
- Katerina Robinson
- Martha Writes (Martha Macdonald)
- Mrs Smith Says It
- Nikola McMurtrie
- Quirks & Foibles (Amy, Amelia, Katie)
- Rants and Big Pants (Neens and DB)
- Rosie Holt
- Sooz Kempner
- Stacey Annor
- The Sugarcoated Sisters
- Thenjiwe Comedy

=== 2021 ===
==== Stage Award ====
- Lara Ricote (winner)
- Bronwyn Sweeney (runner-up)
- Ola Labib (runner-up)
- Abby Wambaugh (finalist)
- Amelia Stubberfield (finalist)
- Beau Holland(finalist)
- Caitlin Powell(finalist)
- Louisa Keight (finalist)
- Natalie Bellingham(finalist)
- Sharon Wanjohi (finalist)

==== Comedy Writing ====
- Kathryn Bond
- Sophie Duker

==== Comedy Shorts Award ====
- Ada Player

==== Content Creator Award ====
- Hayley Morris

=== 2020 ===
- Izzy Askwith (winner)
- Mary O’Connell (runner-up)
- Eryn Tett (runner-up)
- Naomi Cooper (finalist)
- Katie Green (finalist)
- Ania Magliano (finalist)
- Fiona Ridgewell (finalist)
- Christina O’Sullivan (finalist)
- Victoria Olsina (semi-finalist)
- Taran O’Sullivan (semi-finalist)
- Suchandrika Chakrabarti (semi-finalist)
- Olivia Flood-Wylie (semi-finalist)
- Kathy Maniura (semi-finalist)
- Karen Hobbs (semi-finalist)
- Gillian Fitzgerald (semi-finalist)
- Ambika Mod (semi-finalist)

=== 2019 ===
- Laura Smyth (winner)
- Sian Davies (runner-up)
- Charlie George (runner-up)
- Sarah Mann (finalist)
- Liz Guterbock (finalist)
- Helena Langdon (finalist)
- Kemah Bob (finalist)
- Shelf (finalist)
- Jen Ives (finalist)
- Celya AB (finalist)

=== 2017–18 ===
- Thanyia Moore (winner)
- Chloe Petts (runner-up)
- Susan Riddell (runner-up)
- Jodie Mitchell (finalist)
- Lily Phillips (finalist)
- Amy Mason (finalist)
- Louise Young (finalist)
- Megan Shandley (finalist)
- Maisie Adam (finalist)

=== 2016 ===
- Harriet Braine (winner)
- Catherine Bohart (finalist)
- Rose Robinson (finalist)
- Rosie Jones (finalist)
- Rivka Uttley (finalist)
- Micky Overman (finalist)

=== 2015 ===
- Desiree Burch (winner)
- Helen Monks (runner-up)
- Sarah Keyworth (runner-up)
- Christine Entwisle (Comedy Writing Award)
- Rachel Marwood (Comedy Shorts Award)
  - Jane Postlethwaite (finalist)
  - Julie-Anne Meaney (finalist)
  - Kate Kennedy (finalist)
  - Maggy Whitehouse (finalist)
  - Rosana Bosanac (finalist)
  - Sophie Duker (finalist)
  - Tamar Broadbent (finalist)

=== 2014 ===
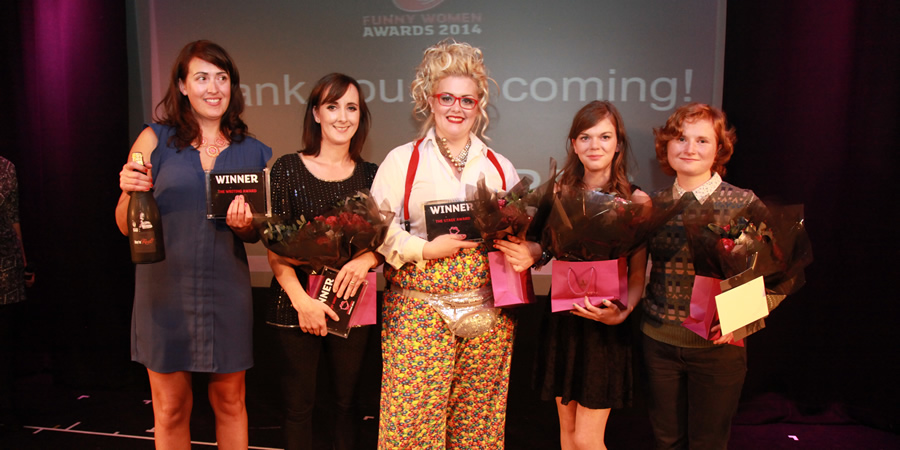
The 2014 awards, left to right: Megan Heffernan, Sally Cancello, Jayde Adams, Lauren Pattison, and Aine Gallagher

- Jayde Adams (winner)

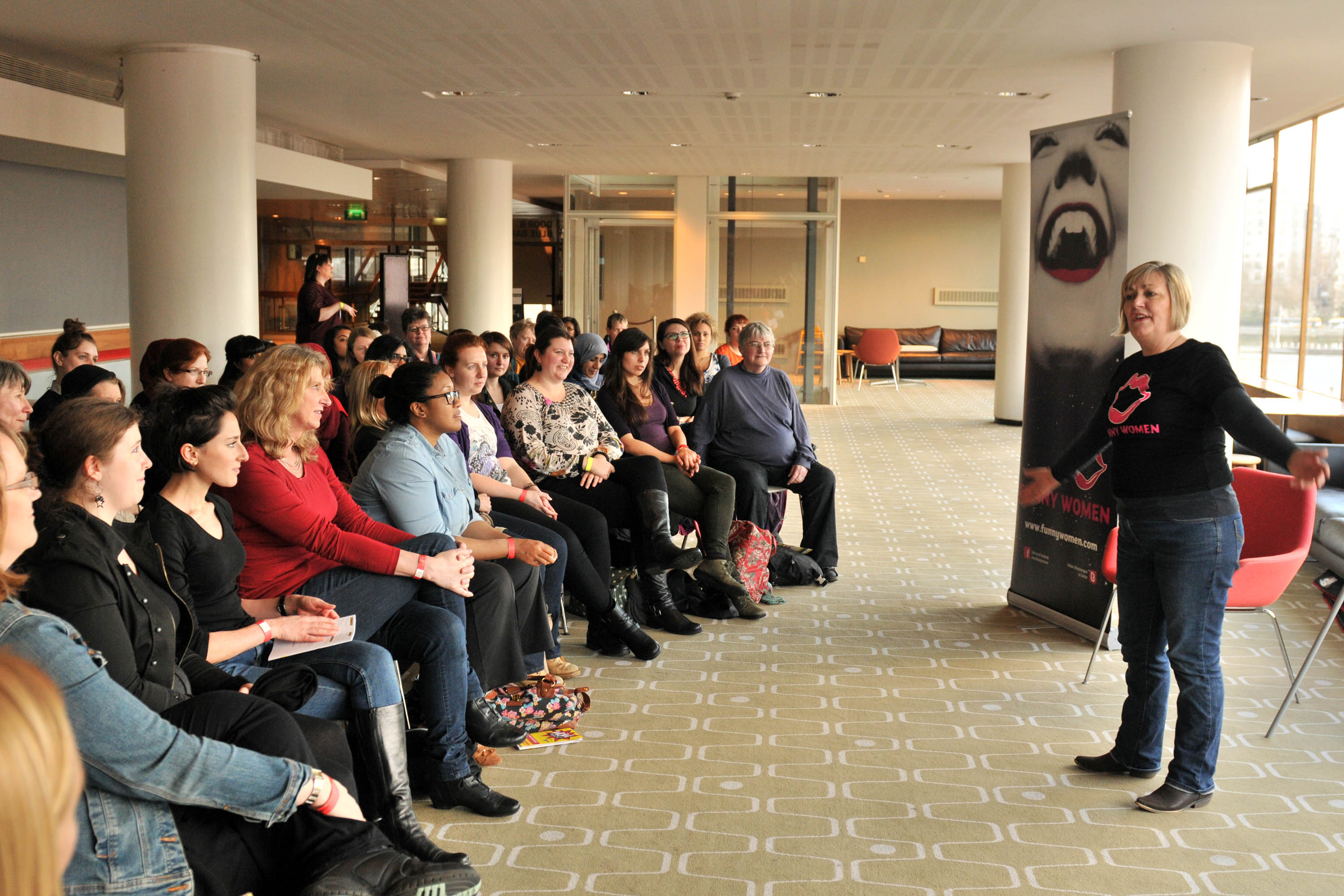
A Funny Women comedy workshop organised by the founder, Lynne Parker, in 2014

- Aine Gallagher (runner-up)
- Lauren Pattison (runner-up)
- Heffernan & Fletcher (Comedy Writing Award)
- Sally Cancello (Comedy Shorts Award)
  - Massive Dad (finalist)
  - Samantha Baines (finalist)
  - Robyn Perkins (finalist)
  - Hawkeye & Windy (finalist)
  - Faye Daniels (finalist)
  - Pauline Shanahan (finalist)
  - Hannah Banana (finalist)

=== 2013 ===
- Twisted Loaf (winner)
- Katie Lane (runner-up)
- Elf Lyons (runner-up)
- Reven & Fennell (Variety Award)
- Cassie Pope (Comedy Writing Award)
- Alex Maher for 'Hope And Gloria' (Best Show Award)
  - Rachel Gleaves (finalist)
  - Bisha Ali (finalist)
  - Tevashnee (finalist)
  - Rachel Slater (finalist)
  - Bethan Roberts (finalist)
  - Becky Brunning (finalist)
  - Sindhu Vee (finalist)
  - Saskia Preston (finalist)
  - Dotty Winters (finalist)

=== 2012 ===
- Gabby Best (winner)
- Niamh Marron (runner-up)
- Katie Tracey (runner-up)
- Suzanna Kempner (Variety Award)
- Sarah Courtauld (Comedy Writing Award)
  - Abi Tedder (finalist)
  - Alice Frick (finalist)
  - Amy Gledhill (finalist)
  - Cerys Nelmes (finalist)
  - General Advice Bureau (finalist)
  - Lucy Frederick (finalist)
  - Lucy Montague-Moffatt (finalist)
  - Sofie Hagen (finalist)
  - The Silky Pair (finalist)
  - Viv Groskop (finalist)

=== 2011 ===
- Lara A King (winner)
- Katherine Bennett (Second)
- Bekka Bowling (Third)
- Ladies Live Longer - Louise Fitzgerald and Victoria Temple-Morris (Variety Award)
  - Gabriella Burnel (finalist)
  - Mel Moon (finalist)
  - Sadia Azmat (finalist)
  - Emily Lloyd-Saini (finalist)
  - Vanessa Bland(finalist)
  - Kerry Gilbert(finalist)
  - Sarah Callaghan(finalist)
  - Checkley & Bush(finalist)
  - Janet Bettesworth (finalist)

=== 2010 ===
- Thankless Child - Liz Black and Freya Slipper (winner)
- Julia Clark (Second)
- Rachel Parris (Third)
- Gemma Whelan (Variety Award)
  - Lindsay Jarman (finalist)
  - Jess Fostekew (finalist)
  - Clare Lomas (finalist)
  - Sarah Hendrickx (finalist)
  - Iona Dudley-Ward (finalist)
  - Alison Thea-Skot (finalist)
  - Abigoliah Schamaun (finalist)
  - Helen Arney (finalist)

=== 2009 ===
- London Hughes as "Miss London" (winner)
- Eve Webster (Second)
- Jo Selby (Third)
  - Charlie Covell (finalist)
  - Tania Edwards (finalist)
  - Giado Garofalo (finalist)
  - Domestic Goddi (finalist)
  - Rhona McKenzie (finalist)
  - Elizabeth Mee (finalist)
  - Catherine Semark (finalist)
  - Marie Vagen (finalist)
  - Katarina Vrana (finalist)

=== 2008 ===
- Katherine Ryan (winner)
- Sara Pascoe (runner-up)
- Rachel Stubbings (runner-up)
  - Sarah Campbell (finalist)
  - Pippa Evans as Loretta Maine (finalist)
  - Rachel Fairburn (finalist)
  - Girl and Dean (finalist)
  - Rowena Haley (finalist)
  - Gráinne Maguire (finalist)
  - Elaine Malcolmson (finalist)

=== 2007 ===
- Andi Osho (winner)
- Joanne Lau (2nd place)
- Sharon Mannion (3rd place)
  - Isma Almas (finalist)
  - Emily Haworth Booth (finalist)
  - Victoria Cook (finalist)
  - Nat Luurtsema (finalist)
  - Missman (Lisa Alabaksh) (finalist)
  - Katie Mulgrew (finalist)
  - Katy Schute (finalist)

=== 2006 ===
- Suzy Bennett (winner)
- Diane Morgan (2nd)
- Christina Martin (3rd)
  - Susan Calman (finalist)
  - Holly Walsh (finalist)
  - Martine Pepper (finalist)
  - Liz Carr (finalist)
  - Maggie Gordon-Walker (finalist)
  - Sonya Kelly (finalist)
  - Rosie Wilby (finalist)

=== 2005 ===
- Debra Jane Appleby (winner)
- Sarah Millican (runner-up)
- Ruth Bratt (runner-up)
  - Wendy Wason (finalist)
  - Steph Baker (finalist)
  - Julie Jepson (finalist)
  - Jude Mahon (finalist)
  - Emma Fryer (finalist)
  - Becky Love (finalist)
  - Helen Keen (finalist)

=== 2004 ===
- Zoe Lyons (winner)
- Anna Crilly (runner-up)
- Janice Phayre (runner-up)
  - Bridget Christie (finalist)
  - Roisin Conaty (finalist)
  - Lindzi Germain (finalist)
  - Susan Hanks (finalist)
  - Sarah Ledger (finalist)
  - Millie & Tillie (finalist)

=== 2003 ===
- Sarah Adams as Jade the Folk Singer (winner)
- Anna Keirle (runner-up)
- Ria Lina (runner-up)
- Kerry Godliman (Highly Commended)
  - Karen Bayley (finalist)
  - Jo Jo Sutherland (finalist)
  - Katy Wix (finalist)
  - Helen Kane (finalist)
  - Debs Gatenby (finalist)
  - Brandy Borr (finalist)

== Charity ==
Funny Women works with organisations that represent aspects of women's wellbeing. It Women has raised awareness and over £70,000 for Refuge, Womankind Worldwide, Rise UK, The Victoria Foundation, Women's Aid, V-Day, ActionAid, Ovarian Cancer Action, the YWCA, Jo's Trust and the Bristol Cancer Help Centre.

== Collections ==
The University of Kent holds material relating to Funny Women as part of the British Stand-Up Comedy Archive. The collection includes material relating to the Funny Women Awards, audiovisual recordings and promotional material for the network.

== See also ==
- List of media awards honoring women
