= Debra-Jane Appleby =

British comedian

Debra-Jane Appelby
- Born: c. 1967; Huddersfield

Debra-Jane Appelby (born c. 1967) is a British award-winning stand-up comedian. She won the third year of the Funny Women competition.

== Life ==
Appelby was born in Huddersfield about 1967.

In 2004 she made the semi-finals of Channel 4’s So You Think You’re Funny. 2005 was her year when she won two awards. She beat Sarah Millican and Ruth Bratt in the third year of the Funny Women competition which Sarah Adams had started in 2003. She also took the main award at the Leicester Comedy Festival that year.

She was later interviewed in 2005 on BBC Radio 4's Woman's Hour by Jenni Murray. It was said that the organisers of the Funny Women competition only found out that she was born a man after the contest. The victory in a women's only competition was considered important.
