= Raw Comedy =

Australian annual comedy award

RAW Comedy
- Awarded for: Stand-up comedy
- Date: 1996
- Country: Australia
- Website: comedyfestival.com.au/raw/

Raw Comedy, stylised as RAW Comedy, is an Australian annual competition for emerging stand-up comedians held by Melbourne International Comedy Festival.

== History and description ==
The Raw Comedy competition was established at the Melbourne International Comedy Festival in 1996. In 2011, there were 1,100 contestants.

The competition is supported by national youth radio station Triple J. As of 2024 the competition attracts around 1,000 entrants annually from all over Australia, and is the largest open-mic comedy competition in the country.

A series of heats take place in major Australian cities through January, February and March. State semi-finals and finals are held in the state capitals in March. Judges select the most impressive state-finalist/s to compete at the Raw Comedy grand finale, which held as part of the Melbourne International Comedy Festival at the Melbourne Town Hall in April and is televised later in June/July of the same year.

The winner of Raw Comedy is sent to the So You Think You're Funny competition at the Edinburgh Festival Fringe. Three Raw Comedy winners (Drew Rokos, Nick Sun, and Demi Lardner) have gone on to win So You Think You're Funny.

== Past winners and finalists ==
Year	Winner(s)	Other finalists
1996	Anthony Menchetti (WA)	Kylie Brickhill & Libby Dempsey are the Plastered Bastard Sisters (Vic)
1997	Subby Valentine (NSW)	Lawrence Mooney; Sue Watt; Adam Richard
1998	Chris Franklin (NSW)	Mickey D (SA); The Dickster (NSW); Lindsay Webb (QLD); Marty Wilson (NSW); Des Dowling (VIC); Sarah Kendall (NSW); Katrina Shiels (QLD); Matthew Sutherland (NSW); Monica (SA)
1999	Chris Wainhouse (Qld)	Adam Rozenbachs (Vic); Gavin Baskerville (WA)
2000	Drew Rokos (Vic)	Penny Pedersen (NSW); Lawrence Leung (Vic); Stav Davidson (Qld); Jyhe Walker (Qld); Fiona O'Loughlin (Qld); Chris Lilley (NSW); Abe Forsythe (NSW)
2001	Emily O'Loughlin (SA)	Alan Rutledge (Qld); Eleven Thh (Tas); Geraldine Hickey (Vic); Luke Whitby (SA); Martin Steel (Qld); Michael Chamberlin (Vic); Penny Tangey (Vic); Robert Nix (NSW); Ronan McChesney (NSW); Ross Janetzki (Qld); Terry North (Vic); Vanessa Hill (NSW); Xavier Michaledes (WA); Yianni Agisilaou (Vic)
2002	Dave Elvins (NSW)	Desh (Qld); Robbie Moore (Qld); Simon Nutt (Qld); Nat Locke (WA); Kai Tier (WA); Ben Richardson (Vic); Mia Timpano (Vic); Andrew McClelland (Vic) Runner Up; Paul Fitzgerald (Vic); Sam Fewings (NT); Jilkamu (Sean Choolburra) (NSW) Runner Up; Jo O'Brien (SA); Zita Whalley
2003	Nelly Thomas (Vic); Steve Sheehan (SA)	Sam Simmons (SA); Jeremy Miller and Chris North (NSW); Shalini Akhil (Vic)
2004	Nick Sun (NSW)	Sam Bowring (NSW); Matt Okine (QLD - Winner); Chris Hague (QLD - Runner Up)
2005	Josh Thomas (Qld)	Ethan Marell (WA)
2006	Hannah Gadsby (SA)	Michael Williams (Vic; runner-up); Celia Pacquola (Vic; Raw Recruit Prize); Dylan Bennett and Kadek Hobman (NT; runner-up); Bart Freebairn (Qld); Bec Hill (SA); Tom Ballard (Vic); Jeff Hewitt (WA); Danii Johnstone (NSW); Paul Ayre (NSW); Sasha Terranova (Vic); Matt Burton (Tas); Ben Jenkins (NSW); Selina Jenkins as "Beau Heartbreaker" (Vic)
2007	Jonathan Schuster (Vic)	Aamer Rahman (Vic; runner-up); Jack Druce (NSW; Raw Recruit Prize); Xavier Susai (WA); Shaun Conroy (Qld); Ellen Briggs (Qld); Maverick (NT); Aleisha McCormack (Tas); Anyone for Tennis (Vic); The D (SA); Tracy Crisp (SA); Saikim Wan (NT)
2008	Neil Sinclair (Vic)	David Cunningham (NSW; runner-up); Laura Davis (WA; Raw Recruit Prize); Mel Buttle (Qld); Ryan Coffey (Vic); John Conway (WA); Michele Fryer (SA); Scott McGowan (NT); Luke McGregor (Tas); Louise Sanz (Vic); Smart Casual (NSW); Jay Sullivan (ACT)
2009	Cassie Workman (WA)	Charles Barrington (Anthony Rogers) (Vic; co-runner-up); Don Tran (Vic; Raw Recruit Prize); Mikey Mileos (NSW); Rhys Nicholson (NSW); Tracey Cosgrove (Tas); Shikhar Thakur (WA); Adam Keily (SA); Nicole Roddy (NT); Pam Rana (Qld); Ben and James Stevenson are The Stevenson Experience (ACT); Ash Walmsley (Qld; co-runner-up); Shannon Woodford as "Adele" (Vic)
2010	Luke Heggie (NSW)	Ronny Chieng (Vic; Special Mention); Geoffrey Windle (Qld; Special Mention); Catherine Hall (Vic); Callan Durlik (WA); Levi Dobson (NT); Moataz Hamde as "Mo-Taz" (SA); James Mullany (WA); David Bakker (Tas); Sam Radford (Vic); Anne Edmonds (Vic); James McCann (SA); Chloe Alison Escott (Tas)
2011	Dayne Rathbone (Vic)	Khaled Khalafalla (Vic; runner-up); Tom Gaynor (SA; runner-up); Xenethor (NT); Adam Knox (Vic); Adam Francis (Vic); Tien Tran (WA); Genevieve Fricker (NSW); Laura Hughes (NSW); Sam Campbell (Qld); Ting Lim (Qld); Claire Sullivan (Tas)
2012	Lessons with Luis (Vic)	Amos Gill (SA; runner-up); Cameron James (NSW; runner-up); Andrew Wolfe (NSW); Hayman Kent (Vic); Mitchell McCutcheon (Qld); Georgie Carroll (SA); Mike Nayna (Vic); Dylan Hesp (Stephen) (Tas); Kyle Walmsley (NT); Jon Pinder (WA)
2013	Demi Lardner (SA)	Cameron Duggan (Qld; runner-up); Andy Matthews (Vic; runner-up); Chris Menezies (Tas); Justin Crooks (NT); Sean Conway (WA); Colin Ebsworth (WA); Jay Morrissey (Vic); Megan McKay (Vic); Aaron Chen (NSW); Becky Lucas (Qld); Tim Noon (ACT)
2014	Matt Stewart (Vic)	Katie Burch (NSW; runner-up); Cyrus Bezyan (NSW); Jennifer Burke (Qld); Michael Kelly (NT); Megan McCrea (Vic); Kerri Gay (Tas); Matt Storer (WA); Marc Ryan (SA); Simon Etheridge (WA); Justin Hayward (Vic); Rohan Desai (Raw India winner and special guest)
2015	Angus Gordon (Qld)	Rohan Ganju (Vic; runner-up); Jess Perkins (Vic; special mention); Sam Taunton (Vic; special mention); Jono Mastrippolito (Tas); Amy Hetherington (NT); Anamarg (ACT); Charlie McCann (NSW); Cory John Rist (WA); David McNevin (NSW); Ismail Ali (Vic); Nicholas Huntley (SA)
2016	Danielle Walker (VIC)	Clinton Haines (NSW; runner-up); Naomi Higgins (VIC); Chris Kearney (NSW); Craig Quartermaine (WA); David Woodhead (NT); Emily Vascotto (QLD); James McMahon (ACT); Lewis Garnham (SA); Maedi Prichard (TAS); Michael Shafar (VIC); Squirly (WA)
2017	Zack Dyer (VIC)	Bonnie Tangey (NSW; runner-up); Shaquille Blackley (WA; runner-up); Andrew Bensley (ACT); Jason Williams (NT); Oliver Twist (QLD); Brad Hollis (SA); Isabella Roldan (TAS); Jared Keen (VIC); Carla Wills (SA); Billy D'Arcy (NSW); Daisy Webb (VIC)
2018	Bec Melrose (NSW)	Emma Holland (ACT; runner-up); Gavin Sempel (VIC; runner-up); Alex Hall-Evans (SA); Bronwyn Kuss (QLD); Emo Majok (WA); Jane New (TAS); Kevin Jin (NSW); Matthew Vasquez (VIC); Ryan McArthur (NT); Scout Boxall (VIC); Sian Smyth (NSW)
2019	Fady Kassab (NSW)	Laura Hutchinson (WA; Runner-up); Suraj Kolarkar (QLD; Runner-up); Rose Bishop (VIC); Steph Broadbridge (NSW); Jacob Jackman (SA); Arun Alexan (NT); Edwin Tetlow (ACT); Double Dee (VIC); Harry Morrissey(VIC); Sam Horton (TAS); Elliott Stewart (NSW); Rakhesh Martyn (VIC); Kathryn Thomas (NSW)
2021	Prue Blake (VIC)	Caitlin Maggs (ACT); Dhruv Iyer (WA; special mention); Hamish Levis (TAS); He Huang (VIC); Jayde O'Brien (QLD; special mention); Kelly Gulliver (NT); Mathew Hespe (VIC); Patrick Golamco (NSW; runner-up); Rudy-Lee Taurua (SA); Tom Witcombe (NSW); Zoë Sitas (NSW)
2022	Alexandra Hudson (NSW) and Bron Lewis (QLD)	Aves Robins (WA); Blake Pavey (VIC); Cathal Leslie (ACT); Delhi Buoy (SA; runner-up); Dom McGovern (WA); Guneet Kaur (NSW); Heather Joan (VIC; runner-up); Iona Colville (TAS); Joshua Coutinho (QLD); Nathan Powell (NT)
2023	Henry Yan (VIC)	Elysia Hall (NSW); Ginny Hollands (VIC); Hadi Kilman (SA); Jack O'Sullivan (TAS); Jacquelyn Richards (ACT; runner-up); Jarryd Prain (NSW); Meg Jager (QLD; runner-up); Nicole Shi (WA); Rapha Manajem (VIC; runner-up); Scott Northover (NT); Trish Hurley (ACT); William Wang (VIC)
2024	Omar Gadd (NT)	Stella Kappos (SA; runner-up); Stephanie Hare (TAS; runner-up); Dylan Murphy (VIC); Jamieson Gilders (QLD); Aaqib Merchant (VIC); Nathan Chin (NSW); Stella Wu (NSW); Cam Muratore (VIC); Kiyanosh Sahebi (NSW); Suma Iyer (ACT); Jazz Bing (WA)
2025	Peter Josip (VIC)	Josh Spyro (QLD; runner-up); Mariah Nickolas (NSW; runner-up); Charlotte Kuruc (ACT); Martin Darcey (WA); Jay Kelly (NT); Freddie Arthur (VIC); Michael Cho (NSW); Montana Papadinis (VIC); Nadun Hetti (VIC); Scott Lleonart (TAS); Nick Starkey (ACT); Jazz King (SA)
