= Mikey Mileos =

Australian stand-up comedian

- Born: William Michael Mileos; 6 December 1980 (age 45); Australia

Comedy career
- Years active: 2006–present
- Medium: Stand-up
- Website: MikeyMileos.com

Mikey Mileos (born 6 December 1980) is a stand up comedian and comedy writer from Sydney, Australia who lives in Japan.

In April 2009, Mileos was a national finalist in Triple J radio's Raw Comedy competition, a nationally televised event. Since then, he has played at almost every major comedy club in Australia. In 2010, he was selected to perform alongside a slew of international comedy veterans in the Sydney Comedy Festival's Cracker Night gala, a rare feat considering he did not actually have a show in the festival.

His comedic style combines observational comedy into one-liners, incorporating political and philosophical ideas.

As a comedy writer Mileos worked on the Australian hit television show Good News Week. Mileos has also worked as a freelance comedy writer for Australian lads magazine Zoo Weekly, but insists that it was only for the money.

== Festival Shows ==
- 2011 Stupid People Will Be Offended - Edinburgh Fringe Festival (as Part of PBH's Free Fringe)
- 2011 They're Just Words - Melbourne International Comedy Festival, Sydney Comedy Festival
- 2010 These Are My Jokes - Melbourne International Comedy Festival
- 2010 Young Guns of Comedy (Sydney Comedy Showcase) - Adelaide Fringe Festival
- 2009 The Night Cap Featuring Jaymie Wilson, Mikey Mileos & Magesh - Melbourne International Comedy Festival
