= Nick Sun =

Australian comedian

Concept art for Nick Sun's 2008 Melbourne International Comedy Festival season promotional material

Nick Sun is an Australian stand-up comedian. He is of Nepalese extraction, but chooses to eschew obvious cultural stereotyping in his act, favouring a style that has been described as "unhinged", "offensive" "nihilistic" and "self-destructive."

In 2004, Sun won Raw Comedy, a national competition for new comic talent run by the Melbourne International Comedy Festival. That same year, he also went on to win the So You Think You're Funny competition grand final, held at the Gilded Balloon as part of the Edinburgh Festival Fringe.

Alongside his appearances at Australia's major comedy venues, Sun regularly appears at the Cracker Comedy Festival, Melbourne International Comedy Festival, Adelaide Fringe Festival, and Edinburgh Festival Fringe. In 2006, he performed at the invitation-only Just For Laughs Festival in Montreal, Canada.

Sun's 2006 Melbourne International Comedy Festival show "Blood on the Yolks in the Key of Owls" was awarded the Director's Choice award by festival director Susan Provan.

His favourite walk on song is "Here comes the Sun" by The Beatles. He usually takes the length of the song to get on stage.

Sun stars in the Sci-fi feature film Astro Loco.
