= Michael Fabbri =

English stand-up comedian

Michael Fabbri is an English stand-up comedian based in Brighton. In 2003 he reached the final of So You Think You're Funny. As well as performing all over the world, he has also performed in several solo shows at festivals.

He has written for Channel 4's television show Stand Up for the Week and was a support act during Micky Flanagan's 'Out Out' tour in 2011.

His BBC Radio 4 comedy series on dyslexia, Dyslexicon, was produced by Dabster productions and was first broadcast in May 2016 and repeated in September 2018.

== Edinburgh Fringe ==
Fabbri has performed five solo shows at the Edinburgh Fringe:

- Dumbing Up (2008). A themed show on the subject of intelligence and stupidity. The anonymous reviewer for The Scotsman wrote, "Looking like an if.comedy best newcomer contender, Michael Fabbri has crafted an exceptionally funny and intelligent show about his stupidity".
- Michael Fabbri (2009). A show in which he primarily recounted tales from his 8 years working in a Job Centre.
- Fabrications (2010). A lightly themed show about deception and lying. During this show he recounted an incident in his early 20s when his former best friend embroiled him in an incident in which his friend's seemingly innocent plan to produce his own reality TV show ended in disaster. Marissa Burgess noted, "[Fabbri] is an amiable and engaging storyteller and his tales from various points in his life are liberally peppered with excellent punchlines".
- Buffering (2013). An unthemed stand up show. Writing for Chortle, Jay Richardson found that, "[…] this capable comic sells himself short with some initial hesitation and a sporadic lack of confidence in his material, occasionally offering decent jokes apologetically rather than delivering them. […] What follows is unquestionably a mixed bag, with the storytelling strands stronger than the observational gags. Nevertheless, Fabbri's distinctively off-kilter views and easy shifting of gears between bewilderment and acute perception is effective. […] Not all gold but an entertaining hour nonetheless."
- Oversharing (2014)
