= Lauren Pattison =

English stand-up comedian

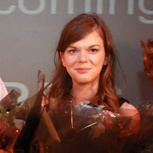
Lauren Pattison at the 2014 Funny Women Awards

Lauren Pattison (born December 1993) is an English comedian from Newcastle who was nominated for the Best Newcomer award at the 2017 Edinburgh Festival Fringe for her debut show Lady Muck, and for Best Show in 2022 for It Is What It Is.

== Career ==
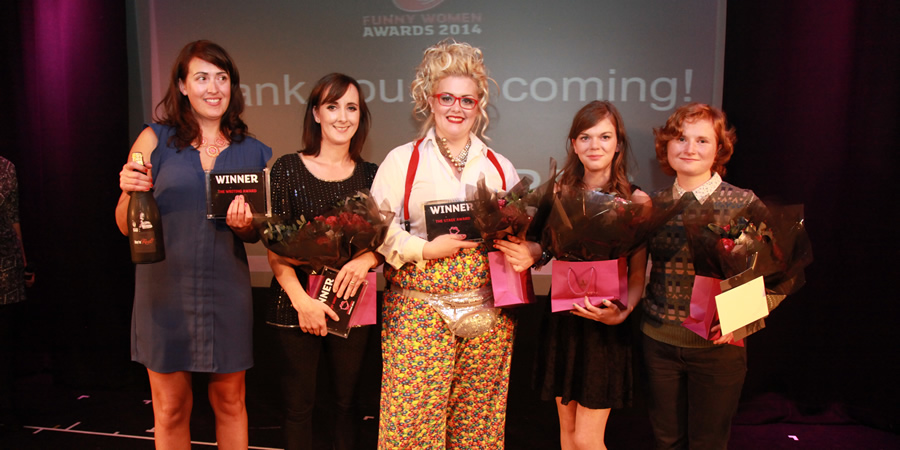
Funny Women Awards. Left to right: Megan Heffernan, Sally Cancello, Jayde Adams, Lauren Pattison, and Aine Gallagher

Pattison was a finalist in the 2015 Chortle Student Comedy Awards and the 2016 BBC New Comedy Award. She was nominated for the Best Newcomer award at the 2017 Edinburgh Festival Fringe for her show Lady Muck.

Having started doing comedy aged 18, after university Pattison supported Katherine Ryan on tour. Pattison has played at comedy festivals and toured in Australia, New Zealand and Canada.

She returned to the Edinburgh festival in 2018 with her show Peachy.

In April 2019, Pattison began co-hosting the podcast Conversations Against Living Miserably with Aaron Gillies supported by Dave.

In September 2020, she appeared as a featured performer alongside Mo Omar and Tom Lucy on the first episode of BBC Three's Stand Up for Live Comedy, filmed in Bristol and hosted by Jayde Adams.

In 2024, it was announced that Pattison will write and star in a four-part sitcom, Tom and Lauren are going OOT, for BBC Radio 4 alongside fellow Geordie Tom Machell. Season 2 was announced in August 2025.

Pattison's 2024 Edinburgh Fringe show was titled Big Girl Pants.
