= Micky Overman =

British stand-up comedian

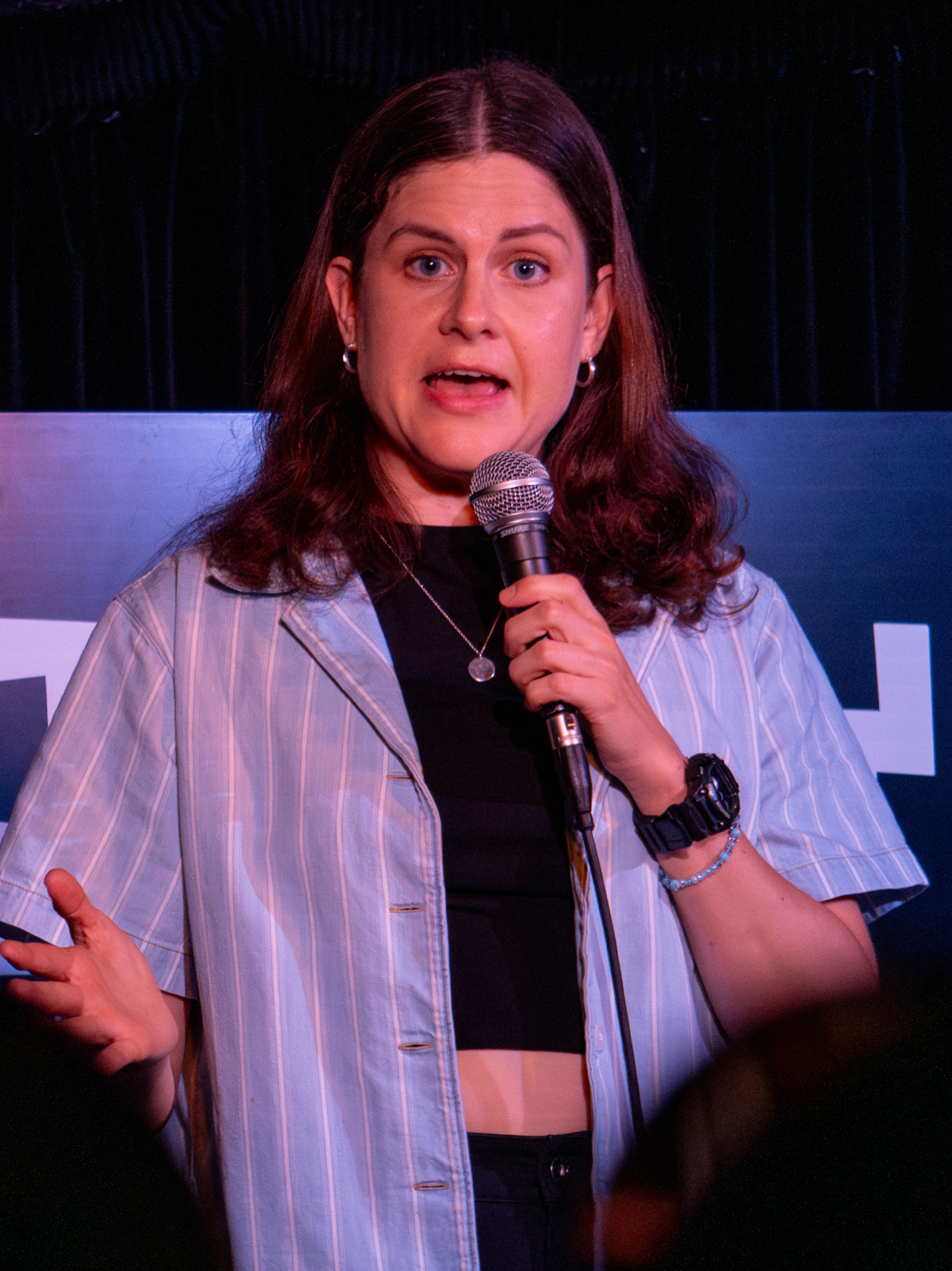
- Overman in 2024
- Born: Netherlands

Comedy career
- Years active: 2015–present
- Website: www.mickyoverman.com

Micky Overman is a Dutch-born British stand-up comedian, writer, and actor. Originally from the Netherlands, she moved to London in 2015 and performs regularly across the UK and Europe. She was a finalist in the 2016 Funny Women Awards and a nominee for Chortle Best Newcomer in 2018. Her work includes appearances on ITV2, Channel 4, BBC Three, and digital platforms such as Pulped and The Hook.

Overman's live shows have been performed at the Edinburgh Festival Fringe and received positive reviews, including from *The Wee Review*. She has also supported comics such as Jamali Maddix, Fern Brady, Sarah Keyworth, and Sean McLoughlin.

== Early life and education ==
Originally from the Netherlands, Overman spent time in Vancouver before moving to London in 2015 to pursue stand-up comedy. She studied acting and improvisation prior to her comedy career.

== Career ==
=== Stand-up comedy ===
Overman made her Edinburgh Festival Fringe debut in 2018 with Role Model. Her 2022 show, Small Deaths, was described as "well-constructed, laugh-packed” by *The Wee Review*. She returned in 2023 with The Precipice, which was listed among the best-reviewed comedy shows of the year.

In 2025, she began touring with her show Hold On.

=== Television and digital media ===
Overman has written and performed for shows such as The Stand Up Sketch Show (ITV2), Fresh From the Fringe (BBC Radio 4), and DMs Are Open (BBC4 Extra). She has also produced sketch and character work for online platforms Pulped and The Hook.

=== Podcasting ===
She co-hosts the podcast Thank F*** For That with comedian Sarah Keyworth. The show features guests discussing close calls and pivotal moments in their lives.

== Style and themes ==
Overman’s comedy is noted for its self-aware, direct delivery and material that explores identity, family, and social expectations. Her writing often mixes autobiographical honesty with observational humour.

== Selected shows ==
- Role Model (Edinburgh Fringe, 2018)
- Small Deaths (Edinburgh Fringe, 2022)
- The Precipice (Edinburgh Fringe, 2023)
- Hold On (UK tour, 2025)

== Awards and recognition ==
- Finalist – Funny Women Awards (2016)
- Nominee – Chortle Best Newcomer (2018)
