= Charlie George (comedian) =

British writer and comedian

Kali Varghese formerly known as Charlie George
- Born: Swindon, England
- Occupations: Comedian, writer, performer, poet
- Years active: 2008–present
- Agent: Chambers Management
- Notable work: Cunk on Life, Death to 2020, Death to 2021
- Awards: LGBTQ New Comedian of the Year, So You Think You're Funny (finalist), Funny Women Awards (Runner up)
- Website: kalivarghese.com

Kali Varghese formerly known as Charlie George is a British writer, performer, poet and comedian from Swindon. In 2019, she won "The Comedy Bloomers LGBTQ+ New Comedian of the Year" and was a runner-up in both So You Think You're Funny and Funny Women.

As a scriptwriter, she has written for British comedy shows Have I Got News for You, Death to 2020, Death to 2021, Blankety Blank, Joe Lycett's Got Your Back and Frankie Boyle's New World Order.

Varghese was chosen to feature in Charlie Brooker’s writers' room for Cunk & Other Humans (2019), the BAFTA-nominated AntiViral Wipe (2020), Death to 2020 and ...2021 for Netflix and BBC’s Emmy-nominated Cunk on Life. She has written for the C4 Election night special, 8 Out of 10 Cats, Hypothetical, Newsjack, The Now Show, Have I Got News For You, Horrible Histories, Joe Lycett’s Got Your Back, Frankie Boyle’s New World Order, Stand Up to Cancer (C4) Kiri Pritchard-McLean’s Best Medicine (R4) Season 1 and 2 and Mawaan Rizwan’s BAFTA-winning Juice (BBC).

She has been published in: Tangled Roots: Real Life Stories from Mixed Race Britain, Stories of Autistic Joy and HNDL Magazine. She currently writes on all things travel, nature, gardening and decolonial perspectives on healing for our times at her Medium and Substack.

In 2020, she was one of a select group of 14 new writers selected by Penguin Random House UK for their WriteNow editorial programme.

In 2022, she worked with fellow comedian Victoria Comedy (winner of LGBTQ+ Comedian of the Year 2022) on the compilation show Clandestina: Queer Comedy Triple Bill, which was performed at the Edinburgh Fringe Festival.

In 2025, she was nominated for an Emmy Award for her work as a writer of Cunk on Life (Netflix).

She has written multiple original comedy/comedy-drama scripts and won two New York Festivals Radio Awards for ‘Best Writing’ & ‘Best Regularly Scheduled Comedy Programme’ for her writing contributions to Rockanory an original series for Absolute Radio with Unusual Productions.

Varghese was a regular MC/host and spoke and gigged all across the country. She was the host of a large scale touring work in collaboration with artist Amartey Golding in a show called Whose Anthem is it Anyway? with a full live band, exploring an alternative collective national anthem for England with the public using a voting app.

She also co-hosted an Audible original podcast series exploring evidence-based solutions to improving wellbeing and mental health with anthropologist Mary-Ann Ochota, called Happiness and how to get it because her preferred title, Despair and how to release its death grip, was not “a viable option”, and hosted a podcast for the Tate Modern gallery called The Art of Comedy.

Varghese has been in the arts in the UK since her early teens, training at Circomedia in Bristol and setting up her own dance company Dark Island Dance where she choreographed and led commercial performances for festivals and large scale events, as well as community dance in care homes and specialist schools for those with disabilities.

In response to a sexist remark made in UK parliament and the creation of the feminist festival Calm Down Dear, Varghese formed the rebel feminist performance collective ‘The Femme Fatales’ exploring themes of sovereignty and bodily autonomy.

Varghese occasionally gigs for and speaks at organisations such as Faith to Faithless and Humanists UK who support people with the trauma of being raised within and leaving high control religious groups.

She is currently working on her first book.

== Accolades ==
- Finalist, Leicester Square New Comedian of the Year, 2018
- Winner, The Comedy Bloomers LGBTQ+ New Comedian of the Year, 2019
- Runner-up, So You Think You're Funny, 2019
- Runner-up, Funny Women, 2019
- Finalist, Pride's Got Talent, 2019
- Nominee, Chortle Awards Newcomer of the Year, 2020

== Credits ==
Year	Production	Role
2022	Latitude Festival	Self
2021	Have I Got News For You - Series 62: 1. Special - Have I Got 2021 For You	Writer (Additional Material)
2021	Death To 2020	Writer
2021	Blankety Blank - Series 18: 1. E7 - Episode Seven; 2. E8 - Episode Eight; 3. Special - Christmas Special	Writer (Additional Material)
2021	Women in Comedy Festival	Self
2021	Rhod Gilbert's Growing Pains - Series 2: 1. E6 - Episode Six	Guest
2021	Rockanory	Writer (Additional Material)
2021	Green Man Festival	Self
2021	Joe Lycett's Got Your Back - Series 3	Writer (Additional Material)
2021	When you are desperate for a job	Employee
2021	Country Mile Comedy Festival	Self
2021	Cambridge Comedy Festival	Self
2021	Laugh Lessons: 1. E10 - Posh Witch	Roo
2021	Yesterday, Today & The Day Before: 1. E4 - Episode Four; 2. Special - Highlights Special	Writer
2021	Have I Got News For You - Series 61: 1. E5 - Episode Five	Writer (Additional Material)
2021	Hypothetical - Series 3: 1. E2 - Episode Two	Writer (Additional Material)
2020	Death To 2021	Writer
2020	The Now Show - Series 57	Writer (Additional Material)
2020	Newsjack - Series 23: 1. E1 - Episode One	Writer
2020	Frankie Boyle's New World Order - Series 4: 1. E1 - Episode One; 2. Special - Unseen & Best Bits	Writer
2020	Larmer Tree Festival	Self
2020	Charlie Brooker's Antiviral Wipe	Writer (Additional Material)
2020	Stuart Goldsmith's Infinite Sofa: 1. E15 - Episode Fifteen	Guest
2020	Circuit Breakers - 2020	Self
2020	8 Out Of 10 Cats - Series 22: 1. E4 - Episode Four; 2. Special - Best Bits	Writer (Additional Material)
2019	Cunk & Other Humans On 2019: 1. E1 - Episode One; 2. E2 - Episode Two; 3. E3 - Episode Three	Writer
2019	Women in Comedy Festival	Self
2019	Asian Network Comedy - 2019 Specials: 1. E1 - BBC Radio Theatre; 2. Special - 2019 Highlights Special, Part 1	Self
2014	Asian Network Comedy: 1. E10 - Asian Network Comedy Highlights	Self
2008	Never Better	Tom Merchant
