= Jayde Adams =

British actress and singer (born 1984)

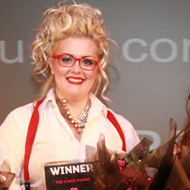
- Adams winning Funny Women in 2014
- Born: Jayde Pricilla Gail Adams; 26 November 1984 (age 41); Bedminster, Bristol, England
- Occupations: Comedian, actress, author, singer
- Years active: 2011–present
- Website: jaydeadams.com

Jayde Pricilla Gail Adams (born 26 November 1984) is a British comedian, actress, writer and opera singer from Bristol. She is the winner of the 2014 Funny Women Award.

== Early life ==
Born in Bedminster, Bristol, Adams attended her aunt's freestyle disco dancing classes with her sister for 13 years.

She moved to South Wales at the age of 18 and studied drama, theatre and media at The University of Glamorgan. In Wales, Adams performed experimental theatre and contemporary dance at the Wales Millennium Centre, Cardiff Bay. She currently lives in Bristol.

== Career ==
Adams started performing stand-up comedy in 2011, following the premature death from an inoperable brain tumour of her sister Jenna, with whom she had danced competitively for 13 years at her aunt's dance school in Bristol. As a child, Adams attended several youth theatre groups in Bristol, including Bristol Old Vic Youth Theatre but never formally trained in acting or singing. She moved to Wales in 2004 to study drama, Theatre and Media at the University of Glamorgan.

In 2012, she was nominated by Time Out magazine as their wildcard for The Hospital Club 100 Awards list of "Most Influential Person in the Arts".

In 2013, she won the London Cabaret Awards audience vote.

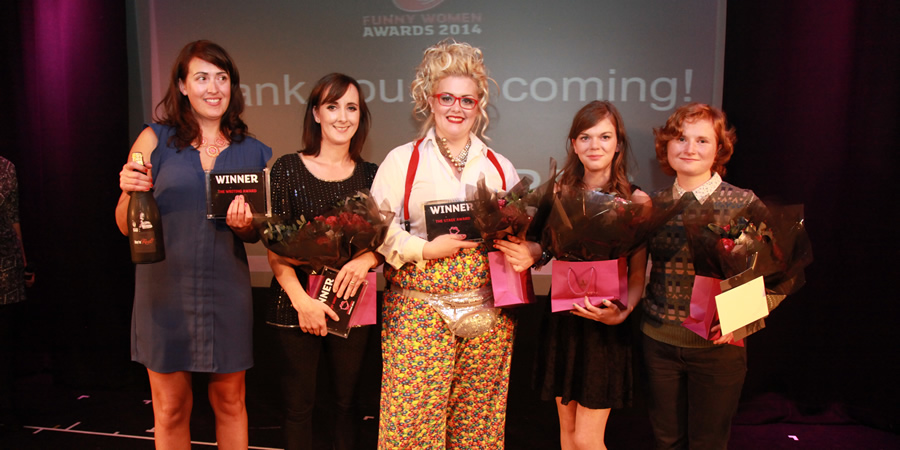
Funny Women Awards. Left to right: Megan Heffernan, Sally Cancello, Adams, Lauren Pattison, and Aine Gallagher

She was the winner of the 2014 Funny Women Award. She hosted the 2020 Funny Women Finals at The Comedy Store in London. Due to the Coronavirus pandemic, the competition was performed with no audience present.

In 2015, having performed as an Adele impersonator on the drag scene in London, Adams was asked to join several other Adele impersonators for a show the BBC were doing about impersonators. During the recording, Adams walked out, saying, “I thought it was going to be this reality show." She missed out on an opportunity to meet Adele during a prank set up by the BBC and Graham Norton for Adele at the BBC because she didn't trust the producers' motives.

In August 2015, Adams co-hosted the NBC show Before the Morning After, featuring The Pyjama Men, Gina Yashere and Tom Stade. The segment involved Adams finishing the show by singing Offenbach's Barcarolle. In December 2015, she made her TV acting debut in Russell Howard's A Gert Lush Christmas.

In October 2016, Sky Arts released Adams' Halloween comedy short, Bloody Tracy, written by and starring Adams and featuring Spencer Jones and Gabby Best.

In August 2016, Adams wrote and performed in 31, her debut Edinburgh Festival Fringe show, which was nominated for Best Newcomer at the Edinburgh Comedy Awards. She has since been a panellist on Channel 4's comedy quiz shows, 8 Out of 10 Cats and 8 Out of 10 Cats Does Countdown.

In 2017, she hosted Say Whaaat? on Comedy Central with The Tenderloins and Russell Kane. She was also a contestant on Dave's Dara Ó Briain's Go 8 Bit opposite Simon Gregson and host of Comedy Central's Live at the Comedy Store in 2018.

During the 2017 Edinburgh Fringe, Adams' second show Jayded won The Scottish Sun's awards for Best Show and Best Female Performer and was nominated for The Barry Awards for Best Performer. She collaborated with Jerry Springer: The Opera writer Richard Thomas for a song in the show called "No More Mrs Nice Jayde". She transferred this show in December 2017 to London's West End, Soho Theatre with Thomas joining her every night on piano, for the finale.

In 2017, Adams performed stand up on BBC One and appeared on the Red Nose Day broadcast.

In March 2018, alongside Melanie Blatt, Nicole Appleton and Shaznay Lewis from All Saints, Jaime Winstone and British fashion designer Gareth Pugh, Adams was a judge on Miss Sink The Pink 2018, an annual drag queen talent competition held at The Roundhouse in Camden.

Adams attended the Edinburgh Festival Fringe in 2018 with her third show, The Divine Ms Jayde, a homage to Bette Midler's debut album The Divine Miss M.

She starred as Julia Petley in the 2019 television adaptation of Terry Pratchett and Neil Gaiman's Good Omens.

In 2019, Adams performed "The Ballad of Kylie Jenner’s Old Face" at the Edinburgh Fringe Festival. A performance of the show, performed at The Bloomsbury Theatre, was recorded for Amazon Prime Video and released in January 2020 with the title Serious Black Jumper. The show poked fun at modern-day feminism and social media and involved jokes surrounding the observation that celebrities wear black turtle necks to seem more serious.

In 2020, Adams was long-listed for the 2020 Emmy Awards by The Hollywood Reporter columnist Scott Feinberg for "Best Variety Special (Pre-Recorded)" for her Amazon Prime Stand up Special Serious Black Jumper.

Adams is the host, along with Fred Sirieix from Channel 4's First Dates, of the BAFTA nominated TV show Snackmasters, which aired on Channel 4 in 2019. In a cook off at the KitKat factory, Monster Munch Factory and Burger King Factory, two top chefs compete to make the perfect replica, before being judged by the workers and bosses behind the real thing.

In January 2020, she hosted a new food show on Netflix and Channel 4 with Heston Blumenthal called Crazy Delicious, which was long-listed for a TV Choice Award in 2020.

Adams is the only celebrity guest to have been ejected from the imaginary restaurant on the Off Menu Podcast hosted by James Acaster and Ed Gamble. A repeated format point states, if a guest mentions the ‘magic ingredient’ previously decided upon before they start the interview, they will be kicked out of the restaurant. Jayde said she would like traditional British dessert topping, hundreds and thousands on her dream dessert.

During August 2020, and because of the pandemic, Adams hosted and organised 3 comedy shows with Al Murray at The Clapham Grand for a charity benefit titled Save Live Comedy. The show was named after a hashtag that went viral in July 2020 when The Live Comedy Association found that 77.8% of live comedy venues across the UK are currently fearful of having to shut down within the next year, in the aftermath of the coronavirus pandemic and lockdown measures.

It featured over 50 comedians from the UK comedy scene, including; James Acaster, Joe Lycett, Nish Kumar, Aisling Bea, Mawaan Rizwan, Dane Baptiste, Kerry Godliman, Ed Gamble, and Shaparak Khorsandi. Each show was over 3 hours long and broadcast to an audience at home on Zoom. The three shows raised over £20,000, which was split between the comedians' favourite comedy venues.

In September 2020, Adams hosted the first episode of BBC Three's Stand Up for Live Comedy filmed in Bristol, with guests Lauren Pattison, Mo Omar and Tom Lucy.

Adams appeared in Richard Osman's House of Games, alongside Scott Mills, Rufus Hound and Josie D'Arby.

In April 2020, Adams appeared in the pilot of Alma's Not Normal before appearing in the two series that aired in 2021 and 2024.

In August 2022, Adams was announced to be competing in the twentieth series of Strictly Come Dancing. Her professional partner was Karen Hauer. They were eliminated from the competition in week 5.

In 2023, she filmed her own co-created comedy Ruby Speaking for ITVX, set in a South Bristol call centre, in which she plays the eponymous Ruby. It was cancelled after one series.

== Personal life ==
Adams married festival and club promoter Clayton Wright at Bestival in 2013, having both worked as the priests for the event's Inflatable Church. According to Adams they met in an inflatable church at the top of Robin Hill on the Isle of Wight. In 2022, she stated in an interview with Diva magazine that she identifies as pansexual.

== Filmography ==
Year	Title	Role	Notes
2015	A Gert Lush Christmas	Kelly	TV film
2015	A Spencer Jones Christmas	Shop-assistant	TV film
2016	Before The Morning After	Host	
2016	Borderline	Celeste Ferguson	1 episode, S1
2016	8 Out of 10 Cats	Guest	
2016	8 Out of 10 Cats Does Countdown	Guest	
2016	Sick Note	Cashier	
2016	Bloody Tracy	Tracy	Writer
2017	Affordable Meats	Herself	Writer
2017	Giddy Up Gunty	Deirdre	
2017	Russell Brand's Stand Up Hour for Comic Relief	Guest	
2017	Say Whaaat?	Guest	
2017	The Great Xmas Rant	Guest	
2018	Roast Battle	Contestant	
2018	The Chris Ramsey Show	Guest	
2018	Comedy Central's Live At The Comedy Store	Host	
2018	Dara Ó Briain's Go 8 Bit	Guest	
2019	Good Omens	Julia Petley	
2019	Amusical	Host	
2020	Jayde Adams: Serious Black Jumper	Herself	Stand-up special
2020	Crazy Delicious	Host	
2020–2024	Alma's Not Normal	Leanne	Main role
2022	Strictly Come Dancing	Contestant	
2023	Greatest Days	Claire	
2025	Midsomer Murders	Gemma Westcott	Episode: "Treasures of Darkness"
2026	RuPaul's Drag Race: UK vs. the World	Special guest	Series 3
