= Lucy Rogers =

British science writer

Lucy Rogers MBE CEng FREng FIMechE
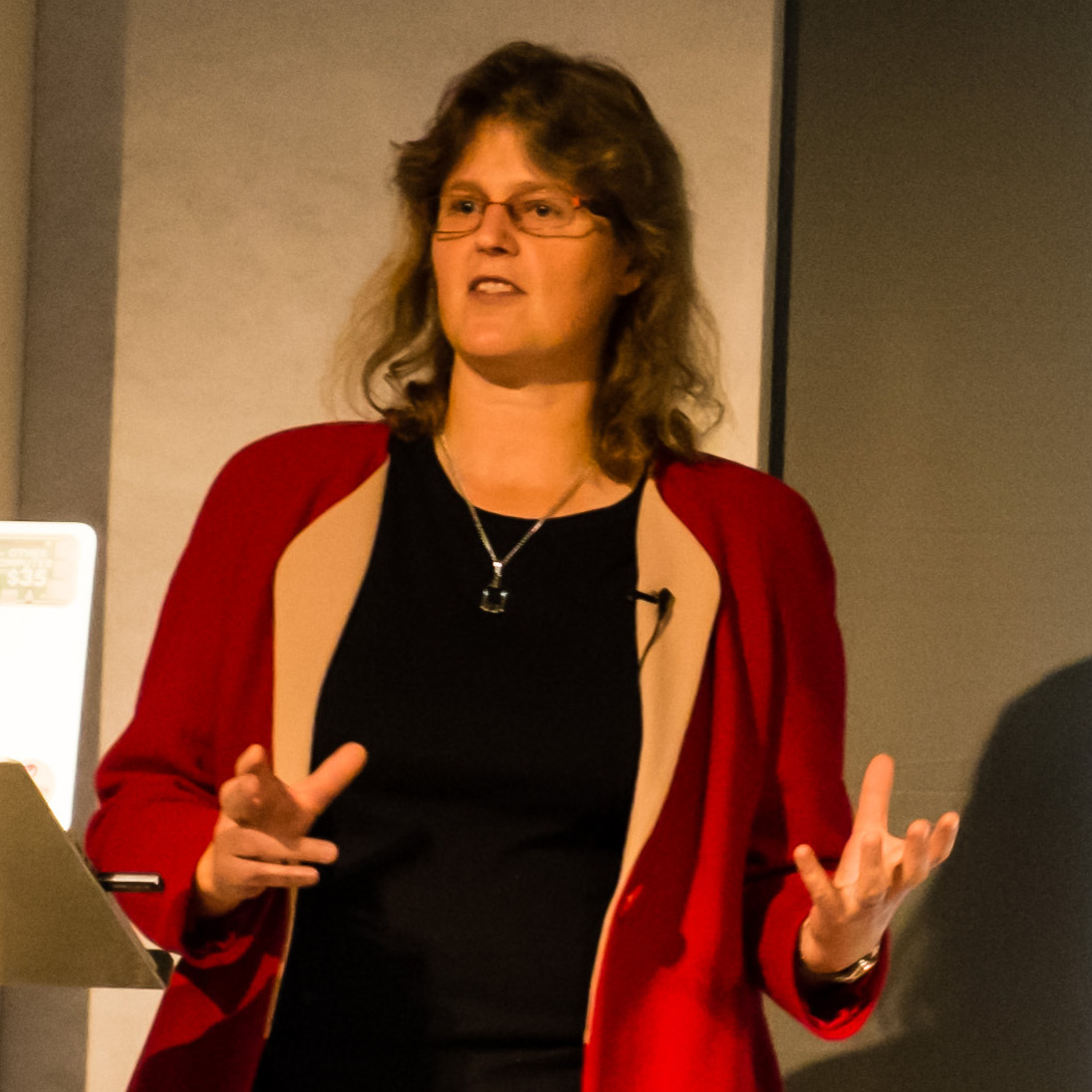
- Lucy Rogers presenting at ThingMonk in 2017
- Born: Lucy Elizabeth Rogers; May 1973 (age 53)
- Education: Lancaster University
- Awards: Fellow of the Royal Academy of Engineering (2020)
- Scientific career
- Fields: Mechanical engineering Public awareness of science
- Workplaces: Brunel University London; Oxford Brookes University; Rolls-Royce Power Systems; Makertorium
- Thesis: Foam formation in low expansion fire fighting equipment (2001)
- Doctoral advisor: Martin Widden
- Website: lucyrogers.com

Lucy Elizabeth Rogers (born 1973) is a British author, inventor, and engineer. She is a visiting professor of engineering, creativity and communication at Brunel University London and has served as a judge on the BBC Two show Robot Wars from 2016 to 2018.

She is the author of the popular-science book "Up: A Scientist’s Guide to the Magic Above Us".

== Education ==
Rogers studied mechanical engineering at Lancaster University with an industrial placement year at Rolls-Royce Power Systems. She graduated with a Bachelor of Engineering degree. She stayed in Lancaster for her PhD which investigated how bubbles are formed in equipment used to fight petrochemical fires.

== Career, research and public engagement ==
She attended NASA's Singularity University graduate studies program in 2011, where she co-authored a report on space debris.

In 2008, she published It's ONLY Rocket Science, a plain English guide to the mechanics of spaceflight.

Rogers hosts The DesignSpark Podcast with comedians Bec Hill and Harriet Braine.

In 2018, she founded the Guild of Makers to bring together makers from all disciplines and skill levels, which ran until 2020.

=== Awards and honours ===
Rogers is a Chartered Engineer (CEng) and was elected a Fellow of the Royal Academy of Engineering (FREng) in 2020. The Rooke Award committee highly commended Rogers for her efforts to promote engineering to the public. She is also a Fellow of the Institution of Mechanical Engineers (FIMechE).

In 2026, she was elected Honorary President of the Institution of Engineering Designers.

In 2024, she received an MBE for "Services to Engineering".

In 2022, she won the "Women in Aerospace and Aviation Committee Award" from the Royal Aeronautical Society and became an Honorary Fellow of the Institution of Engineering Designers.

In 2019, she received an alumni award for "high-flying" Lancaster University graduates.

In 2013, she was shortlisted for the WISE Campaign award.
