= Pat Pilkington =

British cancer care pioneer

Patricia Ann Pilkington MBE (née Pegley, 3 November 1928 – 19 August 2013) was a co-founder of Bristol Cancer Help Centre (BCHC, later the Penny Brohn Centre), providing a more holistic approach to cancer care than found elsewhere in the UK.

== Early life ==
Patricia Ann Pegley was the second of four children, born in Scunthorpe and grew up in Mill Hill, London and later Buckinghamshire. She attended Berkhamsted School for Girls and later the Royal Central School of Speech and Drama.

== Life ==
She worked as a drama teacher in Worcester. In 1954, she married Christopher Pilkington, an Anglican clergyman. They moved to Bristol and from 1968 she worked at BBC Radio Bristol as a producer. In 1980, Pilkington together with her husband, Penny Brohn and Alec Forbes co-founded The Bristol Cancer Care Help Centre, a charity later known as Penny Brohn Cancer Care. She "pioneered the use of meditation and artistic therapies to help cancer sufferers cope with diagnosis and treatment". The charity opened a dedicated centre in 1983, to this day Britain's only cancer center to emphasize the larger care of the patient (i.e. emotional, mental, spiritual, etc.) beyond their physical conditions. Pilkington was awarded an MBE in 2003 for her service to those affected by cancer and their families.

Pilkington died from cancer on 19 August 2013, aged 84. The Prince of Wales Charles (now Charles III) paid tribute to her. She was survived by three children.

== Publications ==
- The Golden Thread: a Quiet Revolution in Holistic Cancer Care. Jessica Kingsley / Vala, 2015. ISBN 978-1908363121.
