= Hannah Platt =

British comedian

- Platt at the 2026 Edinburgh Festival Fringe
- Born: 1992/1993; Merseyside
- Years active: 2019–present

Hannah Platt (born 1992/1993) is an English comedian and writer from Merseyside. She is known for her Edinburgh Fringe debut show Defence Mechanism (2024), which received positive reviews in The Guardian, The Skinny, Chortle, and other outlets. She was runner‑up in the Funny Women Stage Award (2023) and a finalist in the BBC New Comedy Award (2019).

== Early life and background ==
Platt grew up in Merseyside. She initially worked in other fields before transitioning to comedy in her early 20s. She began performing stand-up in Manchester and later moved to national festivals.

== Career ==
=== Stand-up ===
Her debut show, Defence Mechanism, premiered at the 2024 Edinburgh Festival Fringe at Pleasance Courtyard, where reviewers described it as "a compelling hour" that tackled body dysmorphia, mental health, queerness, and therapy.

She has subsequently performed at Soho Theatre (March 2025), Leicester Comedy Festival, Latitude Festival, Download Festival, and Green Man Festival.

=== Style and themes ===
Platt's comedy blends vulnerable personal storytelling with social critique, focusing on body dysmorphia, mental health, queerness, class, and therapy culture. Reviewers note her "crotchety old man trapped in the body of a little girl" persona and her use of confessional yet controlled delivery.

=== Media and writing ===
She has written and featured in short comedy content commissioned by BBC Three and contributed to panel shows on BBC Radio 4.

== Personal life ==
Platt is queer.

== Select shows ==
- Defence Mechanism (Edinburgh Festival Fringe, 2024; Soho Theatre, 2025)

== Awards and recognition ==
- Runner-up – Funny Women Stage Award (2023)
- Finalist – BBC New Comedy Award (2019)
- Nominated – Best Debut Show, Leicester Comedy Festival (2024)
- Nominated - Biggest Award in Comedy, NextUp (2024)
- Nominated - Best Debut Show, Comedians Choice Awards (2024)
- Nominated - Best Debut Show, ISH Comedy Awards (2024)
