= Drew Rokos =

Australian comedian

Drew Rokos is an Australian comedian who won both the 2000 Melbourne International Comedy Festival's Raw Comedy competition and the Edinburgh Comedy Festival's So You Think You're Funny competition.
