= Katherine Bennett (comedian) =

English comedian

Katherine Bennett (née O'Neill) was born in Hertfordshire in 1976. She studied Theology at St Mary's College and went on to complete an MA in Social and Political Philosophy with the Open University in 2006.

In 2011, Bennett was awarded second place in the national Funny Women awards and was, for two of the judges, their winning act. Shortly afterwards Bennett was voted through to the quarter-finals of the Laughing Horse New Act of The Year, which takes place in February 2012. Bennett's distinctive look and deadpan style has seen her described as 'Stand out Stand up' and the female Jack Dee.

She has performed at the Brighton Comedy Festival 2011 and is working with fellow Funny Women finalist Gabriella Burnel to prepare her first show for the Edinburgh Fringe Festival 2012.

== Personal life ==
Bennett is married with five children (She makes reference to having had quadruplets in her routine) and was featured in Feb/March 2012 edition of Gurgle Magazine
