= Crazy Delicious =

- Genre: Game show
- Presented by: Jayde Adams
- Judges: Carla Hall; Heston Blumenthal; Niklas Ekstedt
- Country of origin: United Kingdom
- Original language: English
- No. of series: 1
- No. of episodes: 6

Production
- Production location: BBC Elstree Centre
- Running time: 60 minutes (inc. adverts)
- Production company: Optomen

Original release
- Network: Channel 4
- Release: 21 January – 25 February 2020

Crazy Delicious is a British cooking competition show hosted by Jayde Adams that aired on Channel 4 from 21 January to 25 February 2020.
