= Harriet Braine =

British comedian

Harriet Braine is a musical comedian and archivist. In 2017 she won the Funny Women Awards, for which she was mentored by Ellie Taylor, and she was Best Newcomer at the Musical Comedy Awards. The same year Braine was a finalist in the So You Think You're Funny? competition for new acts.

Braine undertook a five-year Master of Arts course in fine art at Edinburgh College of Art, part of the University of Edinburgh. While studying, she joined Paradok, an alternative theatre group, and became president of the group in her final year.

In 2017, Braine performed an hour-long show at the Edinburgh Fringe; titled 'Total Eclipse of the Art' the show was themed around art history, with one reviewer remarking on Braine's "impressive array of songs about Leonardo Da Vinci, Monet, Tracey Emin, [and] Pablo Picasso". Following this, Braine developed 'Apocolibrary' which she performed at the Edinburgh Fringe in 2018. In the show she took on the role of a librarian during the apocalypse in 2023.

Braine hosts The DesignSpark Podcast, a show about modern technology, with comedian Bec Hill and engineer Lucy Rogers.

== Stand-up shows ==
- Total Eclipse of the Art
- Apocalibrary
- Les Admirables
- Our Souls

== Media ==
Braine has been involved in podcasts and comedy surrounding Artificial Intelligence (AI), science and technology. She has written songs about women in science including Ada Lovelace.

""I had just been thinking about all these amazing scientists. A large number of them, really coincidentally, happened to be women and it really got me wanting to read more and write more about them.

It resonated with a lot of people. I ended up talking to a lot of women in science or teaching fields who came to the show and wouldn't have come otherwise. It's one of those topics that really grabs people who are in that world because there's not a huge amount of comedy out there specifically for them.

It didn't exclude everyone else, either, and a lot of people who didn't know anything about any of the women I talked about said, 'Now I appreciate something I didn't know before'."

She has also been involved in hosting a Platinum Jubilee Street Party in Reading, over half a mile long, with other celebrities.
