= Amos Gill =

Australian comedian (born 1991)

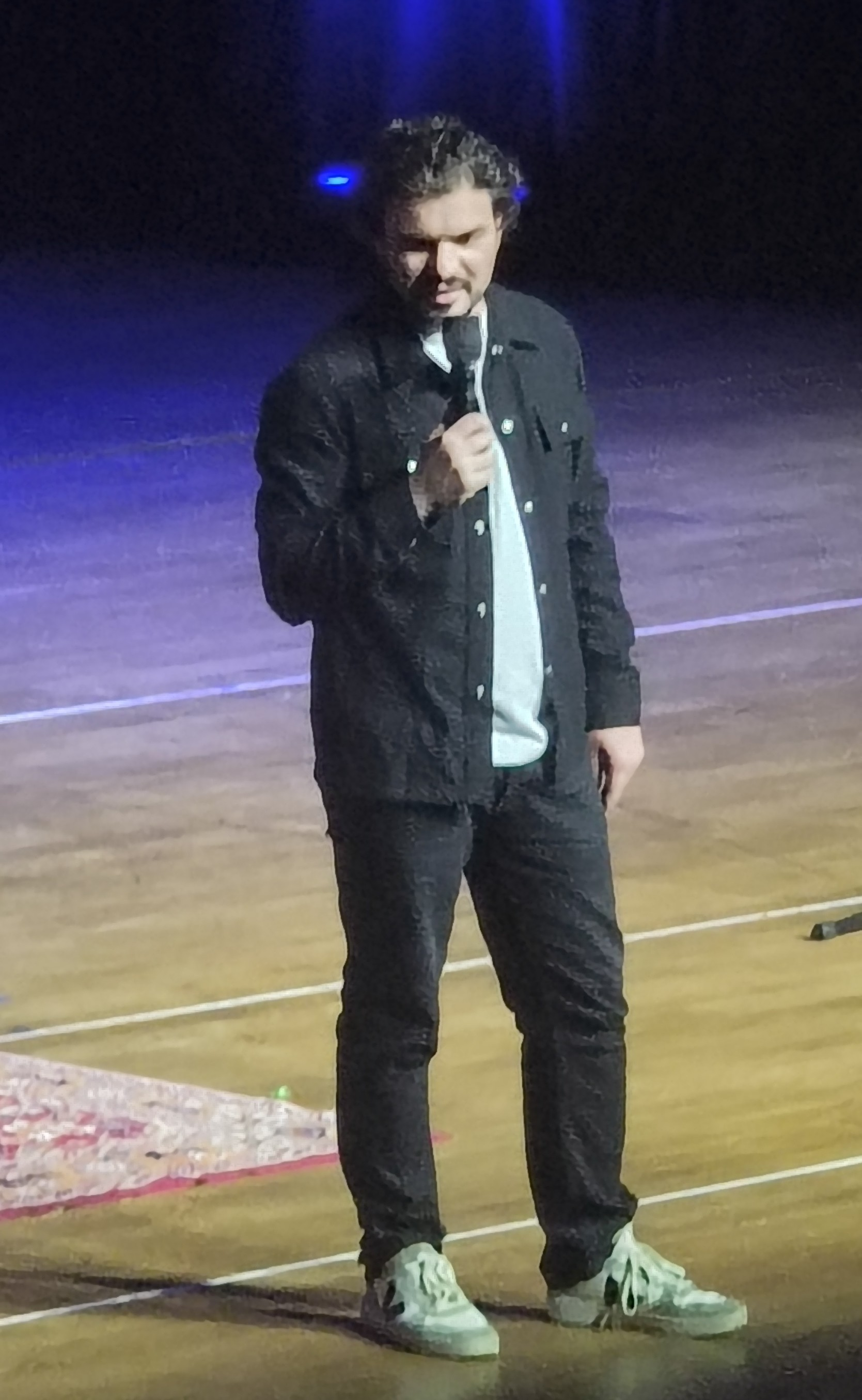
Gill in 2025

Amos William Gill (born 22 June 1991) is an Australian comedian and television and radio presenter.

Gill was born in Adelaide. He attended Mercedes College in Adelaide and Aquinas College in Perth, graduating from the former. He later went on to study law at the University of Adelaide. He is of Croatian-Australian descent.

== Career ==
=== Stand-up ===
Gill's stand-up career started in 2010 when he entered the Triple J Raw Comedy Competition, where he reached the State Final. In 2012, he was a runner-up in the National Final. Gill went on to earn a nomination for the "Best Emerging Comedian" and "People's Choice" awards at the 2013 Adelaide Fringe for his show You've Changed. At the 2013 Melbourne Comedy Festival, Amos was hand-selected by the Melbourne International Comedy Festival for the prestigious "Comedy Zone". In 2014, he was nominated for the MICF "Best Newcomer" award.

He has toured with Jim Jefferies since 2014.

=== Radio ===
In October 2014, Adelaide radio station SAFM rebranded under the name of hit107, and Gill and Dani Pola were announced as the station's first breakfast team.

Gill then presented the Breakfast Show with Angus O'Loughlin and Cat Lynch. He left the program in 2018 to pursue stand up in the United States.

=== Television ===
In 2013, Gill began filming a children's comedy program called Wacky World Beaters for Australian Channel ABC3, under the name of "William Gill", with Amberley Lobo.

He appeared on the SBS World Cup Show ‘The Full Brazilian’ as a guest panellist. In 2018 he was the host of the Channel 7 sports show ‘FootyPlus’.

=== Acting ===
In 2014, Gill appeared in the comedy show ‘Four Quarters’ playing the role of ‘Kane’.

=== Podcast ===
On January 21, 2025, Jim Jefferies and Gill launched the first episode of their podcast 'At This Moment'.
