= Penny Brohn UK =

British cancer charity

Penny Brohn UK, formerly known as the Bristol Cancer Help Centre (BCHC), is a cancer charity that was founded in 1980. It is Britain's only cancer center to emphasize the larger care of the patient (i.e. emotional, mental, spiritual, etc.) beyond their physical conditions. Specifically, the so-called "Bristol Approach" works off of the study of psychoneuroimmunology (PNI)- which is the study of the connections between our mind (psycho), nervous system (neuro) and immune system (immunology). Interest in this method of treatment began as early as the 1970s. Penny Brohn was an original partner of the BCHC with the original help of Christopher Pilkington, Pat Pilkington, and Dr. Alec Forbes. Their credibility was soon after damaged from a flawed report claiming their practices as counter-production to the patient's condition. Over time, the BCHC recovered and regained its reputation. Today, the center educates its clients on many self-help tools and offers practical advice to maintain emotional stability while undergoing cancer treatment. They also participate in influential studies of music therapy and other treatments.

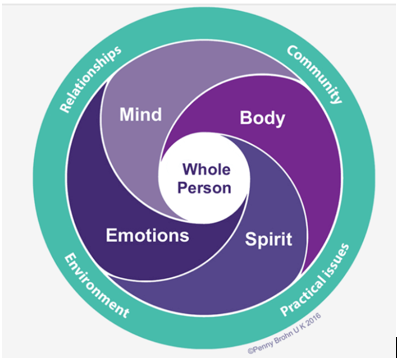
A unique Venn diagram laying out Penny Brohn UK's unique outlook on patient treatment.

Penny Brohn UK's biggest claim to fame is its contribution to music therapy. Common conditions that both listening to music and free improvisational music therapy has been shown to access include withdrawal, general expression of feelings, anger, fear, anxiety, extreme physical tension, confusion, loneliness, complex pain problems and each patient's search for meaning. There are many reasons why music therapy has been a main practice for BCHC. Its philosophy of increasing confidence, feeling powerful and being in control- as well as their approach in stressing an integration of mind, body and spirit- correlates well with music therapy's holistic and unifying effects on recipients.

== History ==
=== Founding ===
In 1975, Pat and Christopher Pilkington decided to offer people a place for meditation, spiritual healing, and natural healing activities such as yoga in house they bought in Bristol where Penny Brohn got quickly involved. Penny Brohn is the poster-figure for who the BCHC tries to reach. In 1979, she was diagnosed with an aggressive breast cancer and was displeased with her treatment with a lack of attention to her emotional, spiritual, or dietary needs. In 1980, the BCHC officially opened with Bea Vernon- the Gentle Approach to Cancer founder- as one of their first patients. In 1983, there was an expansion buying the Grove House to offer 3-day Bristol Approach excursions, 5-day residentials, and taster introductory days. Penny Brohn saw the BCHC's founding principals as follows:

1. That it should be holistic. A place where therapists would show as much interest in people's heads and hearts as in their livers and lymph glands.
2. That people have a right to take responsibility for their own health and should be empowered to do so, promoting their own self healing.
3. That lifestyle changes may prevent cancer occurring or re-occurring, and this message to patients is vital, as is help in making such changes.
4. That safe and gentle therapies could be used to counteract disease and enhance health, alongside conventional medicines seemingly more aggressive approach.

=== Early Struggles and Recovery ===
In 1990, a flawed report called the Chilvers Report nearly closed the BCHC for good. The report claimed a higher death rate for patients that attended to the BCHC's methods compared to those that did more conventional treatments alone. As a result of the bad publicity, classes closed and donations dried up until the Bristol program actually suspended in 1991. This devastated morale until Dr. Catherine Zollman (as at March 2024 - Integrative Director at Penny Brohn - previously Director of Medical Education Service at Research Council for Complementary Medicine) discredited the report for using unfair comparisons based on wide age differences, as well as disease progression differences.

The Way Forward

Written by M. W. Weir, The Way Forward was a set of directives to reinvigorate the BCHC's research. Courses became offered, patients had the opportunity to share and release their emotions, and there became available may therapies. A monitoring and evaluation system was set up with links between the two Bristol universities and Dr. Patricia Hobbs was hired as a research consultant. The Way Forward quickly won over support from Britain's National Health Service and leading oncologists. Penny Brohn also resigned from the consultancy/advisory role she held for the center. She later died in 1999.

=== Post-2000 ===
In November 2006, the BCHC opened Eden Grove on the outskirts of Bristol to increase its capacity by 3x's. This was followed by renaming the BCHC the Penny Brohn Cancer Centre.

== Current Programs ==
Bristol Approach- 2-day immersion

Bristol Retreat- 5-day experience with individual and group course sessions

Alternative Therapies- Massage, Shiatsu, Music Therapy, Art Therapy

Intensive Courses- Relaxation and Breathwork, Meditation, Imagery, or Nutrition

Cancerpoint- A pre-booked individual appointment service, complimentary introductory appointment for free

Library
