= Research Council for Complementary Medicine =

The Research Council for Complementary Medicine (RCCM) is a charitable organisation (UK Registered Charity Number 1146724) founded in 1983 to develop and promote good quality research into alternative and complementary medicine (CAM) and enhance evidence-based medicine in this area.

The RCCM works with the complementary therapy professions and CAM researchers to promote safe and effective integrative and personalised medicine, and to promote the development of high quality research and evidence in the UK into complementary and alternative medicine.

As the burden of complex chronic disease increases more people are turning to alternative and complementary medicine (CAM) and need guidance in making their healthcare choices. CAM is used by at least a quarter of the population of the UK. The research evidence base is limited at present. The ever increasing cost of chronic disease will require government and society to make decisions on the cost-effectiveness of the available health care options. Such decisions are best informed by evidence and currently accepted standards of care.

A greater evidence base for CAM should facilitate wider availability of access to safe and effective complementary therapies within the National Health Service and across the UK, in order to help in preventing disease and improving health.

The House of Lords Science and Technology Select Committee in 2000 published a report on CAM which emphasised the need for improved regulation and increased research into CAM therapies. While regulation of the main CAM professions has made considerable progress, a paucity of funding has limited the development of CAM research.

== History ==
The RCCM was co-founded in 1983 by a medical doctor Dr Richard Tonkins MD FRCP and a lay businessman, Mr Harold Wicks. During the 1980s, the focus of RCCM activity was on encouraging and publishing research projects, and on the exploration of appropriate research methodologies. A scientific journal was established, Complementary Medical Research (ISSN 0268-4055). A University Fellowship to explore CAM was established in partnership with the Medical Research Council and the University of Glasgow. A series of annual conferences on research methodology were organised.

During the 1990s, the RCCM focus was on undergraduate medical education and the inclusion of a CAM module as a part of the curricula for medical education; Dr Catherine Zollman was Director of the RCCM's Medical Education Service from 1996 to 1999 and established a register of GPs with an interest in CAM. An RCCM research project was undertaken on the use of CAM by women with breast cancer, commissioned by South Thames Regional Health Authority

After 2000, the RCCM was commissioned to undertake and completed some very large projects in partnership with universities, including the CAMEOL project for the Department of Health to assess CAM interventions in NHS priority areas by detailed review and critical appraisal of published research

== Current activity ==
The current activities of RCCM are directed towards supporting the CAM professions in research and evidence-based practice, through increasing engagement between the professional bodies, the regulators, and the research community.

The CAM professions in the UK are evolving and maturating. Regulation is well developed, with statutory regulation of osteopathy and chiropractic in place, and herbal medicine, acupuncture and traditional Chinese medicine moving towards statutory regulation. Other therapies such as massage and naturopathy have established voluntary regulation under the Complementary and Natural Healthcare Council (CNHC) and others are moving towards this goal.

Doctoral and post-doctoral research within CAM has guidance on methodology from the MRC. Research capacity in terms of on-going PhD/ MPhil research activity in complementary medicine within UK universities is increasing. However, evidence on the safety and effectiveness of CAM remains much needed, and more remains to be done in terms of translation of research into clinical practice

Funding from the government for research to evaluate the safety and effectiveness of CAM, similar to that in the USA where a research funding council NCCAM provides substantial research funding specifically for CAM research, would enable the evidence base for CAM to develop in the UK.

RCCM maintained the Centralised Information Service for Complementary Medicine database.
