= Tatty Macleod =

French-British comedian

Tatty Macleod (born 1 June 1989) is a French-British comedian. She was born in Zimbabwe to British parents and was raised in France. Her comedy often explores aspects of her bilingual upbringing, code-switching, and dual identities.
