= Claire Postlethwaite =

Applied mathematician

Claire Maria Postlethwaite is an applied mathematician based in New Zealand, where she is a professor in applied mathematics at the University of Auckland and a principal investigator for Te Pūnaha Matatini. Her research involves heteroclinic networks in dynamical systems and delay differential equations, and their varied applications including neuroscience, evolutionary robotics, animal migration, and climate modelling.

== Education and career ==
Postlethwaite was a mathematics student at the University of Cambridge in England. After earning a bachelor's degree in 2001 and taking Part III of the Mathematical Tripos in 2002, she completed her PhD at Cambridge in 2006. Her dissertation, Robust Heteroclinic Cycles and Networks, was supervised by J. H. P. Dawes.

She became a postdoctoral researcher in the US, at Northwestern University and the University of Houston. In 2008, she took a lecturer position at the University of Auckland. She was named as a senior lecturer in 2011 and associate professor in 2017; she is now a full professor there.

== Recognition ==
In 2011, the New Zealand Mathematical Society gave Postlethwaite their Early Career Research Award, in recognition of her "enormous progress in applying mathematics to the study of animal movement, and for her development of fundamental ideas in applied dynamical systems". Postlethwaite was the 2018 recipient of the JH Michell Medal of ANZIAM. She is a Fellow of the New Zealand Mathematical Society.
