= Jane Postlethwaite =

English actress

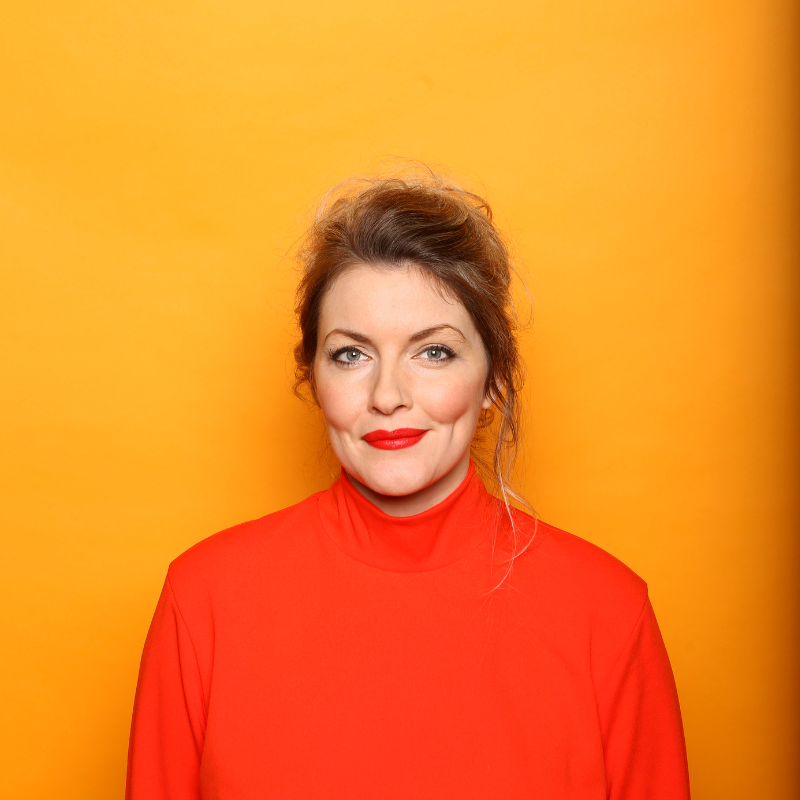
- Portrait by Andy Hollingworth 2019
- Born: Jane Postlethwaite; Cumbria, England, UK
- Occupations: Stand up comedian, Comedy performer, Actor and writer
- Years active: 2015 – present

Jane Postlethwaite is an English comedian, writer and actor. She is originally from Cumbria, England.

She was a Funny Women finalist 2015 and a Brighton Comedy Festival Squawker Award Finalist 2015. She was nominated for the Latest Awards Best Female Performer Award for her work in a set of comedy plays as part of Brighton Fringe 2014. Her 2016 solo character show was called Made in Cumbria. The show had a sold-out run Brighton Fringe in May 2016 with Lamb Comedy Productions. It was nominated for two Brighton Fringe awards – the Latest Comedy Award and for the Audience Choice Award.

The show was taken to Edinburgh Fringe in August 2016 with Sweet Venues. The show had sold out days and received 4 & 5 star reviews. The show was directed by critically acclaimed comedy actress and writer Anna Morris (Bad Bridesmaid, Outnumbered) who has had 3 sell-out solo shows at the Fringe (Dolly Mixture, Would Like to Thank and It's Got to be Perfect). During the Edinburgh Fringe Jane also performed in Anna's hit Fringe show It's Got to be Perfect at the Ballroom in the Voodoo Rooms. The show was sold out every day and also got rave 4- and 5-star reviews.

She ran the successful comedy night Bad Book Project from 2015 to 2018, a monthly, Brighton-based free event where comedians and creatives read from their favourite bad books, which include childhood diaries or stories, fiction, and celebrity autobiographies. She also co-hosted a podcast, Miraculous Cumbria Podcast from 2018 to 2019.

In April 2017 she was in Catriona Knox's Radio 4 comedy drama, Almost like being in Love produced by Caroline Raphael. The play stars Gemma Whelan and Rosie Cavaliero. Her other work for BBC Radio 4 was inclusion of her comedy characters for Jo Neary's 'Inbox'.

In 2017 she debuted her comedy show, The House at Brighton Fringe and Edinburgh Fringe Festival. Her 2018 Brighton Fringe show was called, Last Night at the Circus and centred around real life stories of mental health and what it means to be successful set in a dystopian circus landscape. Since then her shows have been a paranormal sketch show called, Haunted for Brighton Fringe 2019.

In 2020 she set up 'Character Building Productions' which focuses on collaborations to create comedy content online such as the Character Building Podcast. The podcast was a crowdfunded project paying for 24 women from different backgrounds to receive comedy training, studio time, travel expenses so they could write and perform their own comedy sketches or monologues.

She is the host of the paranormal queer comedy podcast called, "All the Terrible Things" which shares the spooky stories of LGBTQI+ folk. Her first solo stand up comedy show called, "Terrible People" premiered at Brighton Fringe and the Women in Comedy Festival 2024.
