= So You Think You're Funny =

Annual stand-up comedy competition

So You Think You're Funny?
- Logo
- Awarded for: Stand-up comedy competition
- Date: 1988
- Country: United Kingdom
- Website: soyouthinkyourefunny.co.uk

So You Think You're Funny? (SYTYF?) is an annual stand-up comedy competition for new acts. The competition began in 1988 in the United Kingdom.

The finals are held every August at The Gilded Balloon during the Edinburgh Festival Fringe. Past winners include Aisling Bea, Dylan Moran, Lee Mack, Peter Kay and David O'Doherty.

== History ==
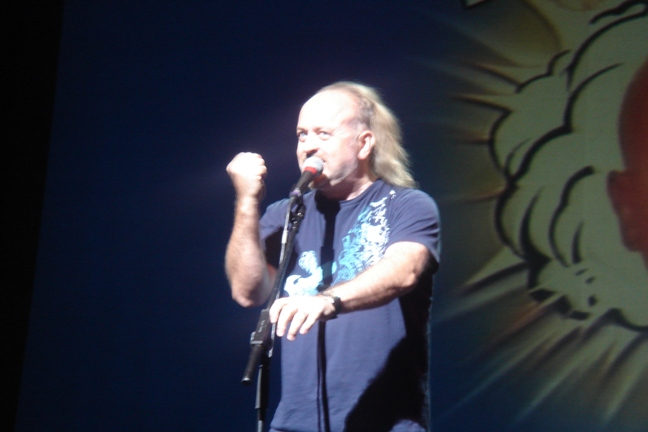
Bill Bailey in 2008

So You Think You're Funny? was the idea of Karen Koren, artistic director of The Gilded Balloon, in order to discover new comic talent. During the years it has developed into the most influential competition of its kind in the UK, helping the careers of many of the country's leading comedians including Dylan Moran, Lee Mack, Graham Norton, David O'Doherty and Tommy Tiernan. Other competitors have included Ardal O'Hanlon, Johnny Vegas, Ed Byrne, Jason Byrne, Alex Zane, Reginald D Hunter, Craig Hill, Alan Carr, Rhod Gilbert, Andrew Lawrence and Russell Howard.

Sponsorship from Channel 4 began in 1993 and ran until 2004, since when Channel 5 and The Paramount Comedy Channel have been sponsors. Now sponsored by Foster's, the first prize is £5,000 and a place in the Best of British Show at the Montreal "Just For Laughs" Festival.

Past judges have included Steve Coogan, Owen O'Neill, Avid Merrion (Leigh Francis), Bob Mortimer and former So You Think You're Funny? winners Dylan Moran and Rhona Cameron.

Compères for the evenings have included Eddie Izzard, Bill Bailey, Graham Norton and Jo Brand.

== Rules and eligibility ==
The rules and eligibility are as follows:

"1. The performer cannot have performed stand-up REGULARLY either paid or unpaid before 1st June of the year prior to the competition. *

2. The performer should not have appeared in So You Think You're Funny? before.

3. The performer’s material must be completely original.

4. The performer must have at least 8 minutes of original material.

5. The organisers reserve the right to select all entrants and decisions taken by the organisers and judges are final.

6. All entrants must be aged 18 and over.

- This means you can have performed, either paid or unpaid before June 2013, but not regularly. So a handful of gigs well spaced out, once or twice, every couple of months is fine, but performing two times a week is too many. The exception to this is those who have performed as part of a recognised comedy course in this period."

== Process of elimination ==
The competition starts in the spring of each year with showcases in Bristol, Liverpool, Birmingham, York, Manchester, Leeds, Glasgow, Inverness, Dublin, Brighton and Nottingham as well as ten comedy clubs in London. In 2013, there were over 500 applicants for only 55 places in the Edinburgh heats.

Each showcase is not a direct competition, with judges instead selecting the best acts they have seen over the entire run to take part in one of seven heats at the Gilded Balloon at the Edinburgh Festival Fringe in August. Winners of each of these heats go forward to the final.

== Winners and finalists ==
=== 2025 ===
Results:

- Madeleine Brettingham (Winner)
- Reb Day (runner up)
- Joel Walker (second runner up)
  - Noni
  - Oro Rose
  - Peter Josip
  - Qasim Akhtar
  - Rachel Porter
  - Sean Chalmers
  - Valeria Vulpe

MC: Laura Lexx

Comedy Guest Judge: Doon Mackichan

=== 2024 ===
Results:

- Alana Jackson (Winner)
- Ciara O’Connor (runner up)
- Ayo Adenekan (second runner up)
  - Alex Gogarty
  - Bert Broadbent
  - Fab Goualin
  - Kate Sharp
  - Sophia Wren
  - Laurie Brewster
  - Paras Patel

MC: Maisie Adam

Comedy Guest Judge: Sue Perkins

=== 2023 ===
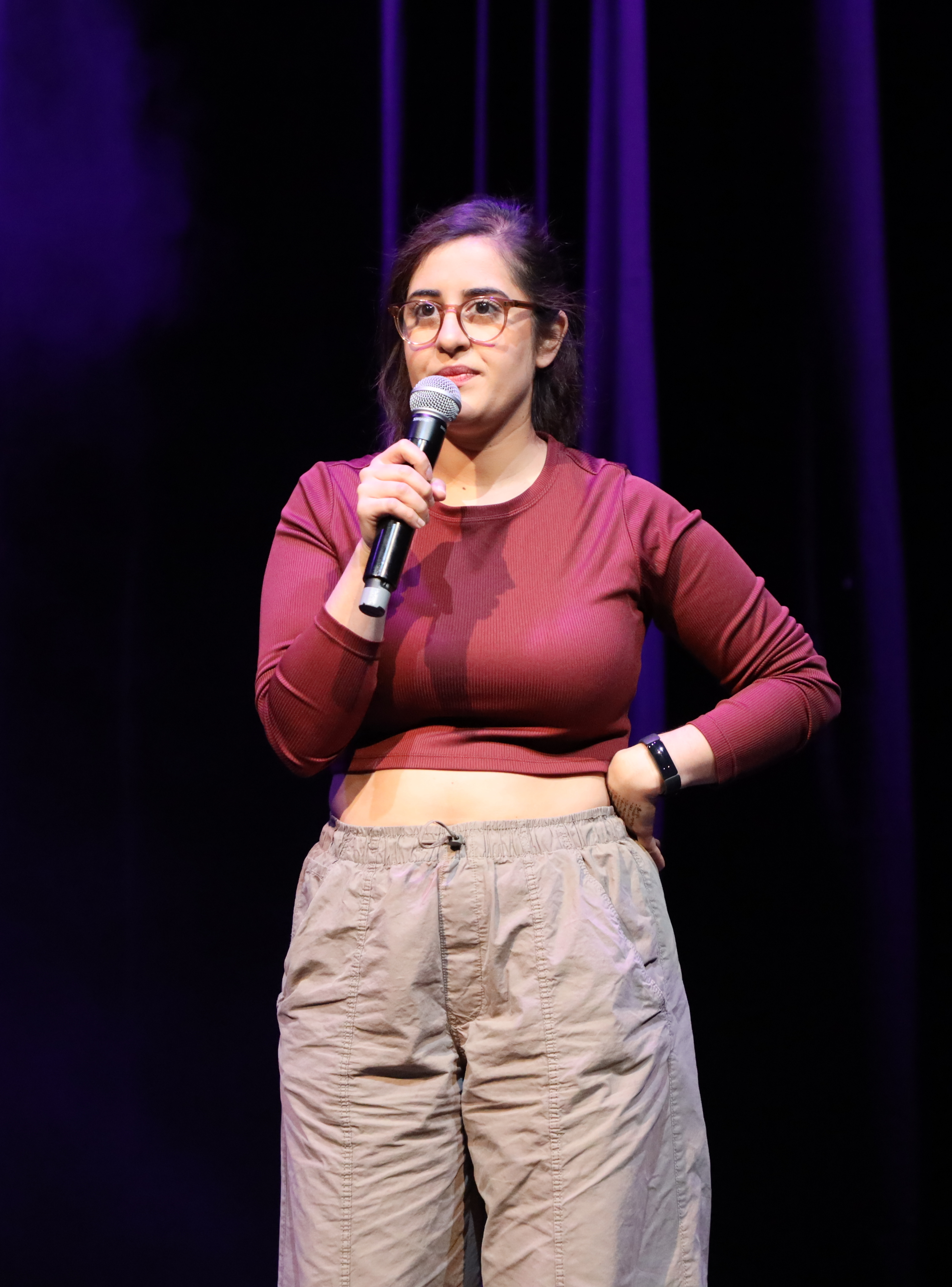
Banks at the 2024 Edinburgh Festival Fringe

There were more than beating out over 400 contestants from across the UK. Results:

- Samira Banks (Winner): Her humor often incorporates her Middle Eastern identity, including how her father arrived in United Kingdom as a refugee. Banks's comedy also involves ethnic groups and adult themes, such as Pornhub.
- Christopher Donovan (runner up)
- Lizzie Norm (3rd)
  - Alex Lennox
  - Archit Goenka
  - Carwyn Blayney
  - Chantel Nash
  - Cormac Sinnott
  - Lauren Carroll
  - Sophie Gerrad

=== 2022 ===
Results:

- Joshua Bethania (Winner)
- Mark Black (runner up)
- Jack Skipper (shared second runner up)
- Pravanya Pillai (shared second runner up)
  - Ben Pollard
  - Daniel Petrie
  - Justina Seselskaite
  - Prakash Jirjadhun
  - Rohan Sharma

=== 2021 ===
Results:

- Omar Badawy (Winner)
- Rae Brogan (runner up)
- Andy Watts (second runner up)
  - Phil Marzouk
  - Farhan Solo
  - Lottie Field
  - Kathleen Hughes
  - Nate Kitch
  - Caroline Maddison
  - Kathy Maniura

=== 2019 ===
Results:

- Finlay Christie (Winner)
- Shane Daniel Byrne (runner up)
- Charlie George (second runner up)
- Claire Haus
- Denis Len
- Erika Ehler
- Fady Kassab
- Kate Bancroft
- Kate McGann

MC: Zoe Lyons

Comedy Guest Judge: Jenny Eclair

=== 2018 ===
Results:

- Danny Garnell (Winner)
- Liam Farrelly (runner up)
- Bec Melrose (shared third)
- Joe Hobbs (shared third)
  - Martin Durchov
  - Natalie Loh
  - Chelsea Birkby
  - Patrick Healy
  - Shane Clifford

MC: Zoe Lyons

Comedy Guest Judge: Rhod Gilbert

=== 2017 ===
Results:

- Maisie Adam (winner)
- Sarah Mann (runner up)
- Morgan Rees (third)
  - Robin Allender
  - Kirsten Brown
  - Jamie D'Souza
  - Archie Henderson
  - Esther Manito
  - Eric Rushton
  - Amira Saied

MC: Aisling Bea

Comedy Guest Judge: David O'Doherty

=== 2016 ===
Results:

- Heidi Regan (Winner)
- Ruth Hunter (runner up)
- Danielle Walker (third)
  - Harriet Braine
  - Kelly Convey
  - Sophie Henderson
  - Jamie M
  - Stuart McPherson
  - Arielle Souma

MC: Zoe Lyons

Comedy Guest Judge: Alan Davies

=== 2015 ===
Results:

- Luca Cupani (Winner)
- Yuriko Kotani (runner up)
- Ed Night (as Ed Day) (third)
  - Ben Pope
  - Yumna Mohamed
  - Neil O'Rourke
  - Matilda Wnek
  - Red Richardson
  - Stephen Lawson (Aka Stephen Tries)
  - AJ Roberts

MC: Zoe Lyons

Comedy Guest Judge: Mark Watson

=== 2014 ===
Results:

- Aidan Strangeman (Winner)
- Elliot Steel (2nd Place)
- Joe Hart (3rd Place)
  - Mark Daniels
  - Jim Smith
  - Benji Waterstones
  - Eshaan Akbar
  - Gary Meikle

MC: Zoe Lyons

Comedy Guest Judge: Jason Manford

Sponsor: Foster's

=== 2013 ===
Results:

- Edward Hedges (Joint Winner)
- Demi Lardner (Joint Winner)
- Laura Mclenaghan (2nd Place)
  - Andrew McBurney
  - Nicky Wilkinson
  - Tom Taylor
  - Alasdair Beckett-King
  - Russ Peers
  - Jenny Collier

MC: Zoe Lyons

Comedy Guest Judge: Sarah Millican

Sponsor: Foster's

=== 2012 ===
Results:

- Aisling Bea (Winner)
- Jonathon Pelham (2nd Place)
- Murdo Haggs (Joint 3rd Place)
- Wayne Mazadza (Joint 3rd Place)
  - Ingrid Dahle
  - Nick Dixon
  - Amir Khoshsokhan
  - Glenn Moore
  - Conor Neville

MC: Jason Cook

Comedy Guest Judge: Ruby Wax

Sponsor: Foster's

=== 2011 ===
Results:

- Tommy Rowson (Winner)
- Dayne Rathbone (2nd Place)
- Lucy Beaumont (Joint 3rd Place)
- Fern Brady (Joint 3rd Place)
  - Andy Clarke
  - Darren Connell
  - Stuart Hossack
  - Alex Kealy
  - Nicola Mantalios-Lovett

MC: Jarred Christmas

Comedy Guest Judge: Lee Mack

Sponsor: The Sims 3

=== 2010 ===
Results:

- James Allenby-Kirk (Winner)
- Liam Williams (2nd Place)
- Rob Beckett (3rd Place)
  - Laura Carr
  - Alex Clissold-Jones
  - Pete Dobbing
  - Romesh Ranganathan
  - Matt Richardson
  - Chris Turner

MC: Rufus Hound

Comedy Guest Judge: Tim Minchin

=== 2009 ===
Results:

- Ivo Graham (Winner)
- Kevin Shevlin (2nd Place)
- Naz Osmanoglu (3rd Place)
  - Richard Bowen
  - Robin Buckland
  - Jim Campbell
  - Kai Humphries
  - Winston Smith

MC: Lee Mack

Comedy Guest Judge: Tim Vine

=== 2008 ===
Results:

- Daniel Simonsen (Winner)
- Seann Walsh (2nd Place)
- Sara Pascoe (3rd Place)
  - Gearoid Farrelly
  - John Gavin
  - Richard Perry
  - Ahir Shah
  - Daniel Sloss
  - Josh Widdicombe

Comedy Guest Judge: Johnny Vegas

=== 2007 ===
Results:

- Richard Sandling (Winner)
- Ben Davis (2nd Place)
- Joanne Lau (3rd Place)
  - Carl Hutchison
  - James Marsh
  - Gar Murran
  - Daniel Rigby
  - Jack Whitehall
  - Toby Whithouse

=== 2006 ===
Results:

- Wes Packer (Winner)
- Hannah Gadsby (2nd Place)
- Ginger & Black (3rd Place)
  - Alan Bennett
  - Caroline Clifford
  - Marlon Davis
  - Raph Shirley
  - Holly Walsh
  - Andrew Watts

=== 2005 ===
Results:

- Tom Allen (Winner)
- Sarah Millican (2nd Place)
- Joe Wilkinson (3rd Place)
  - Charlie Baker
  - Kevin Bridges
  - Robert Broderick
  - Emma Fryer
  - Stuart Goldsmith
  - Josh Thomas

MC: Bill Bailey

=== 2004 ===
Results:

- Nick Sun (Winner)
- Russell Kane (2nd Place)
- Chris McCausland (3rd Place)
  - Lee Bannard
  - Rob Collins
  - Gary Crombie
  - Zoe Lyons
  - Jarlath Regan
  - Rose Heiney

=== 2003 ===
Results:

- Tom Wrigglesworth (Winner)
- Andrew Lawrence (2nd Place)
- Stuart Hudson (3rd Place)
  - Anna Crilly
  - Michael Fabbri
  - Anna Keirle
  - Matt Kirshen
  - Rodney Marques
  - Ed Petrie

=== 2002 ===
Results:

- Matthew Osborn (Winner)
- Mark Watson (2nd Place)
- Nina Conti (3rd Place)
  - Michael Anderson
  - Andy Bone
  - Greg Davies
  - Rhod Gilbert
  - Rufus Hound
  - Greg McHugh
  - Ryan Gleeson

=== 2001 ===
Results:

- Miles Jupp (Winner)
- Stefano Paolini (2nd Place)
- Alan Carr (Joint 3rd Place)
- Michael Downey (Joint 3rd Place)
  - Hils Barker
  - John Bishop
  - Seymour Mace
  - Inder Manocha
  - The Reverend Obadiah Steppenwolfe III

=== 2000 ===
Results:

- Drew Rokos (Winner)
- Des Clarke (runner-up)
  - Mark Dolan
  - Jason Manford
  - Francesca Martinez
  - Mat and McKinnon
  - Les Hommes Sans Noms

=== 1999 ===
Results:

- David O'Doherty (Winner)
  - Josie Long
  - Juliet Cowan
  - Russell Howard
  - Richard Morris
  - Andy Zaltzman
  - Jimmy Carr

=== 1998 ===
Results:

- Rob Rouse (Winner)
  - Dan Antopolski
  - Kevin Hill
  - Reginald D Hunter
  - Nadine Lennard
  - Moz
  - Caroline Quinlan
  - Stuart Stanley
  - Alex Zane

=== 1997 ===
Results:

- Peter Kay (Winner)
  - Nick Doody
  - Paul Foot
  - Jonathan Gunning
  - Stephen Morrison
  - TJ Murphy
  - Rod Woodward

=== 1996 ===
Results:

- Tommy Tiernan (Winner)
  - Jason Byrne
  - Valentine Flyguy
  - John Henderson
  - David Keay
  - Patrick McDonnell
  - Lucy Porter

=== 1995 ===
Results:

- Lee Mack (Winner)

=== 1994 ===
Results:

- Martin Trenaman (Winner)

=== 1993 ===
Results:

- Dylan Moran (Winner)
- Steve Furst (Runner-up)
  - Michael Smiley

=== 1992 ===
Results:

- Rhona Cameron (Winner)

=== 1991 ===
Results:

- Alan Francis (Winner)

=== 1990 ===
Results:

- Trio Brothers Troup (Rab Christie, Greg Hemphill and Neil Warhurst) (Winners)

=== 1989 ===
Results:

- Phil Kay (Winner)

=== 1988 ===
Results:

- Bruce Morton (Winner)
