= NRS =

NRS may refer to:

- JANET NRS, Name Registration Scheme, on 1980s UK academic networks
- National Readership Survey, former UK print advertising audience research
  - NRS social grade, demographic classification
- National Records of Scotland
- National Reporter System, US case law reports
- National Retail Systems Inc., a logistics company
- National Runaway Switchboard, for US runaway youth
- Nederlandsche Rhijnspoorweg-Maatschappij, a Dutch railway company 1845–1890
- Nevada Revised Statutes
- New Regeneration System, in beet-sugar factories
- Nil Ratan Sircar Medical College and Hospital, Kolkata, India
- Non-restorative sleep, a symptom in which sleep is experienced as unrefreshing
- Norwegian Air UK, airline ICAO code
- Nuclear Restoration Services, UK decommissioning company
- Numerical Rating Scale (NRS-11), a pain scale
