= 2005 Conservative Party leadership election =

British leadership election to replace Michael Howard

- 7 October – 6 December 2005
- Turnout: 78.4% (▲0.1 pp)
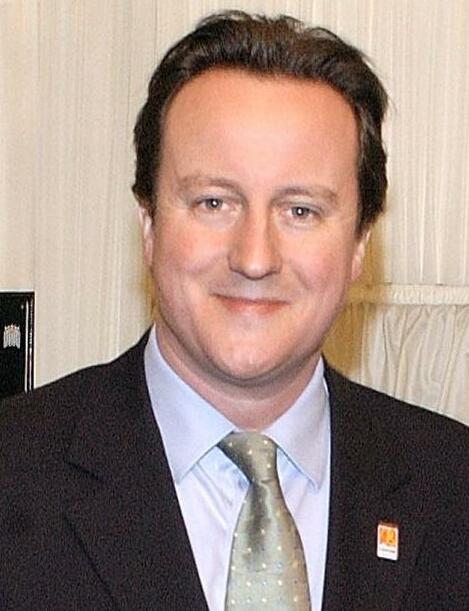

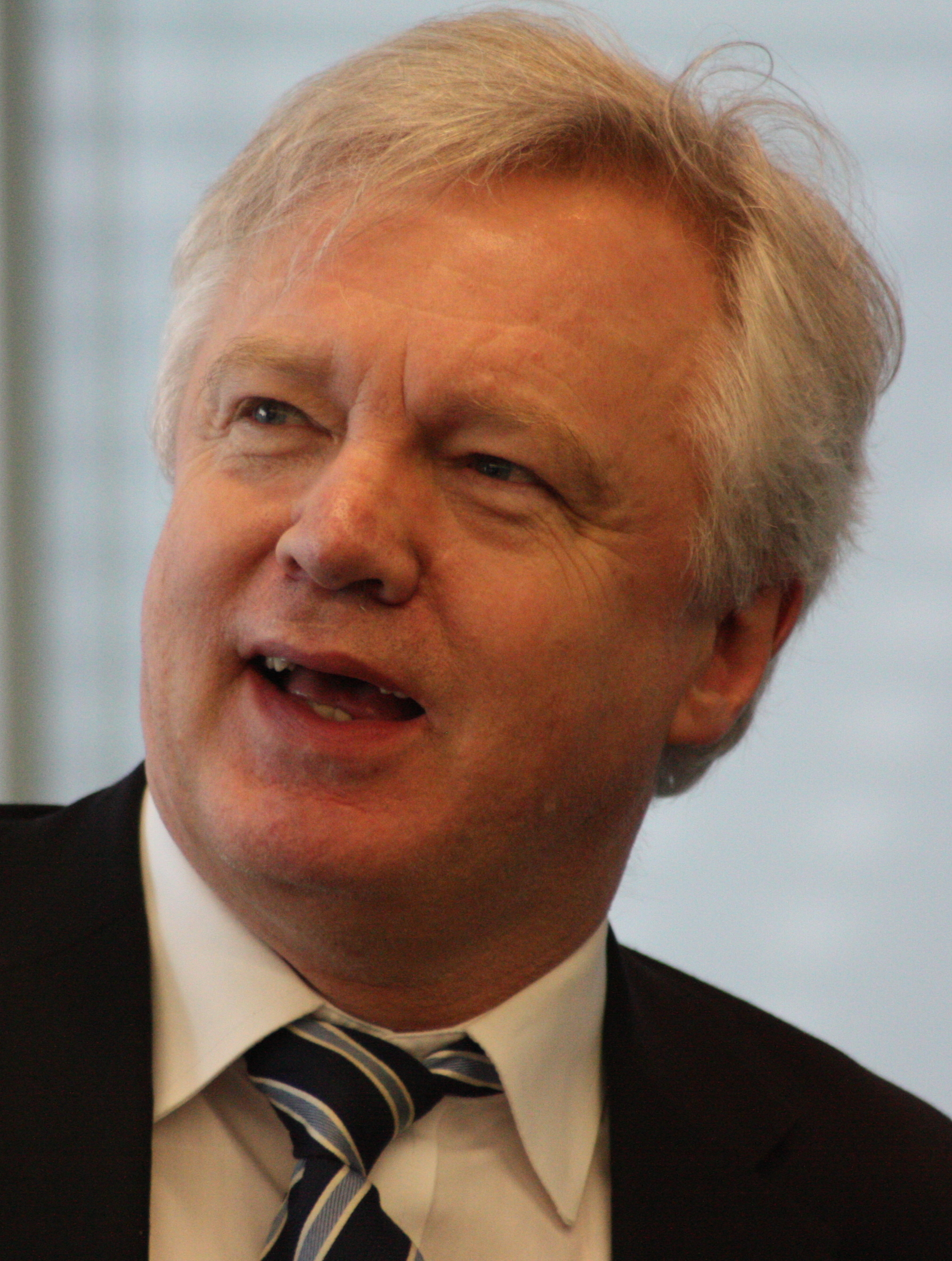

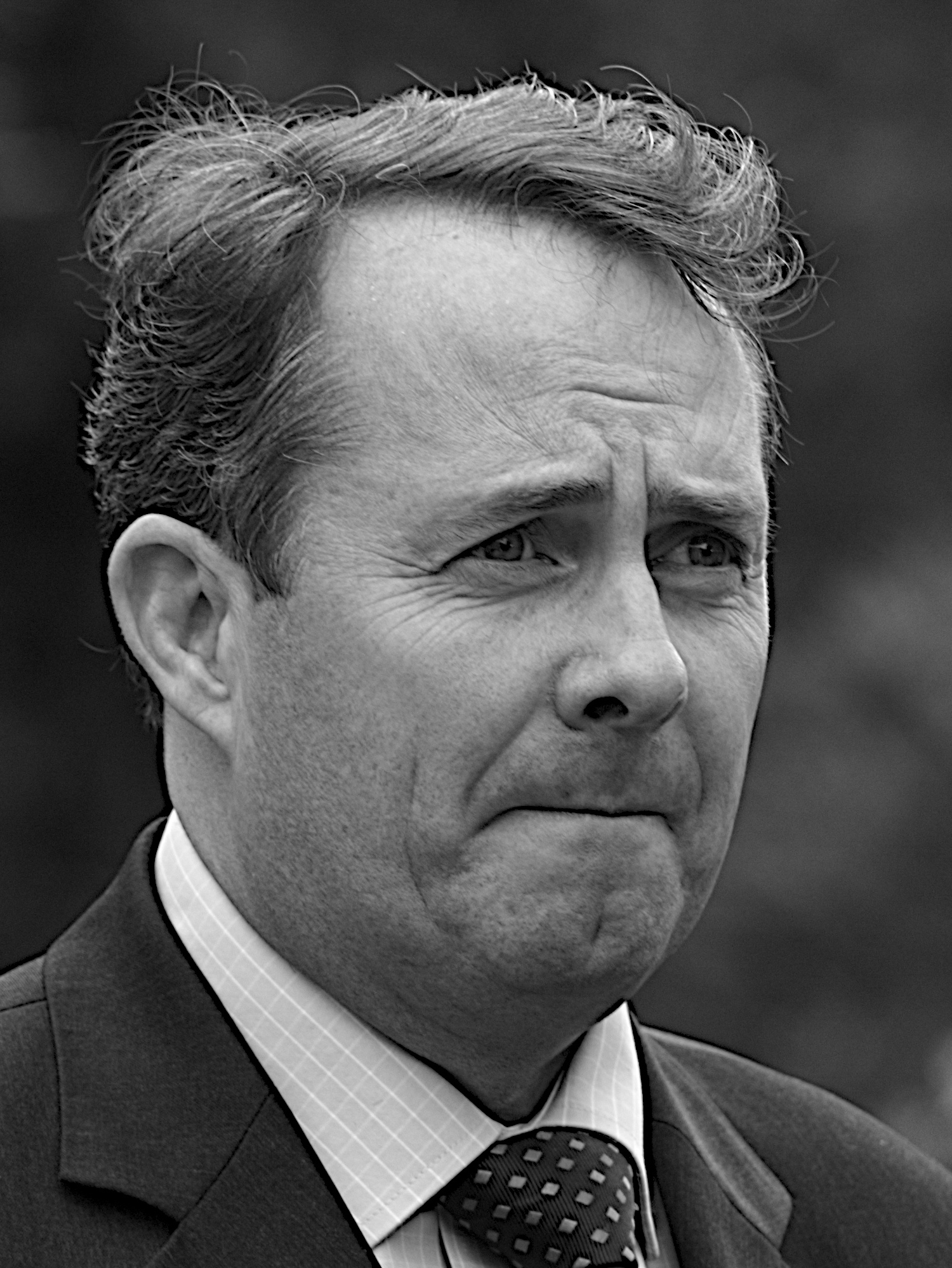

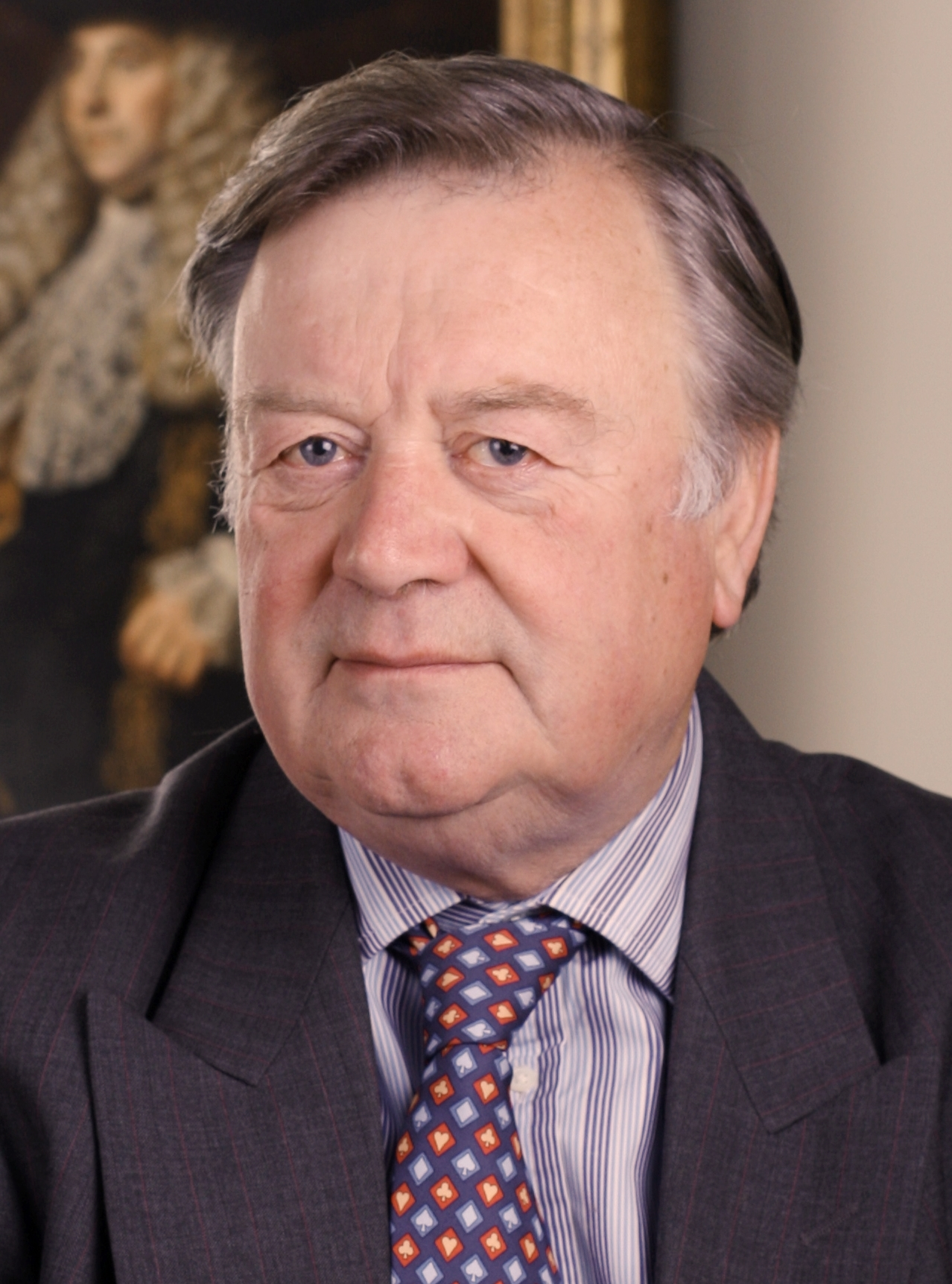
Candidate	David Cameron	David Davis
First ballot	56 (28.3%)	62 (31.3%)
Second ballot	90 (45.5%)	57 (28.8%)
Members' vote	134,446 (67.6%)	64,398 (32.4%)
Candidate	Liam Fox	Kenneth Clarke
First ballot	42 (21.2%)	38 (19.2%)
Second ballot	51 (25.7%)	Eliminated
Members' vote	Eliminated	Eliminated
Leader before election
Michael Howard
Elected Leader
David Cameron

The 2005 Conservative Party leadership election was called by party leader Michael Howard on 6 May 2005, when he announced that he would be stepping down as Leader of the Conservative Party in the near future following the party's third successive general election defeat. However, he stated that he would not depart until a review of the rules for the leadership election had been conducted, given the high level of dissatisfaction with the current system. Ultimately, no changes were made and the election proceeded with the existing rules, which were introduced in 1998.

The contest formally began on 7 October 2005, when the Chairman of the 1922 Committee, Michael Spicer, received a letter of resignation from Howard. Nominations for candidates opened immediately, and closed on 13 October.

The first round of voting amongst Conservative members of Parliament took place on 18 October and Kenneth Clarke was eliminated (38 votes) leaving David Davis (62 votes), David Cameron (56 votes) and Liam Fox (42 votes) to go through to the second ballot on 20 October. In the second ballot, Fox was eliminated (51 votes), leaving Cameron (90 votes) and Davis (57 votes) to go through to a postal ballot. The ballot, whose result was declared on 6 December, saw Cameron win 68% of votes to Davis' 32%.

== Candidates ==
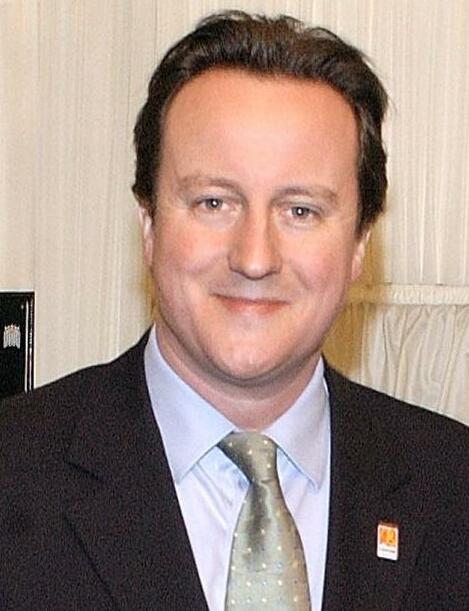
David Cameron
MP for Witney, Shadow Secretary of State for Education

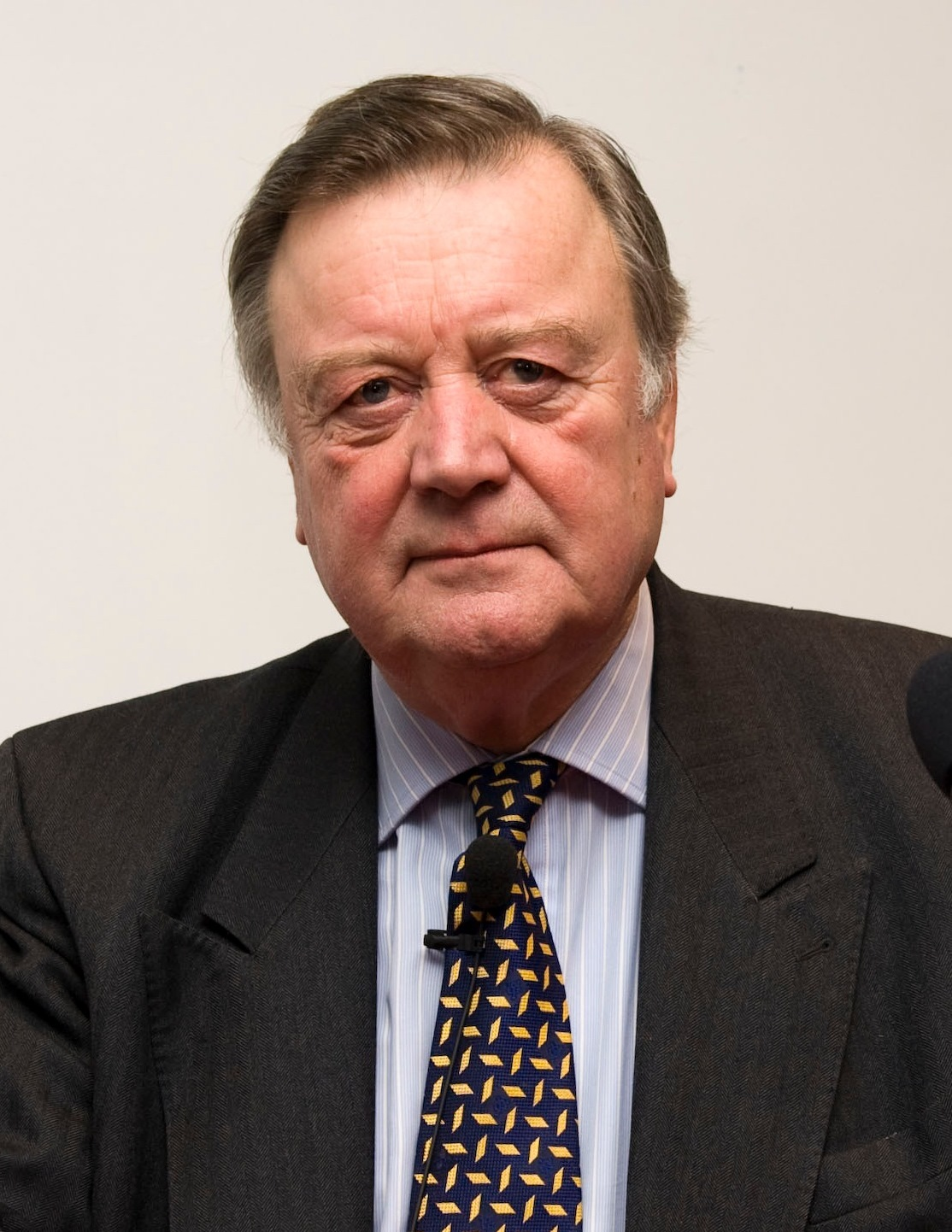
Kenneth Clarke
MP for Rushcliffe, former Chancellor of the Exchequer

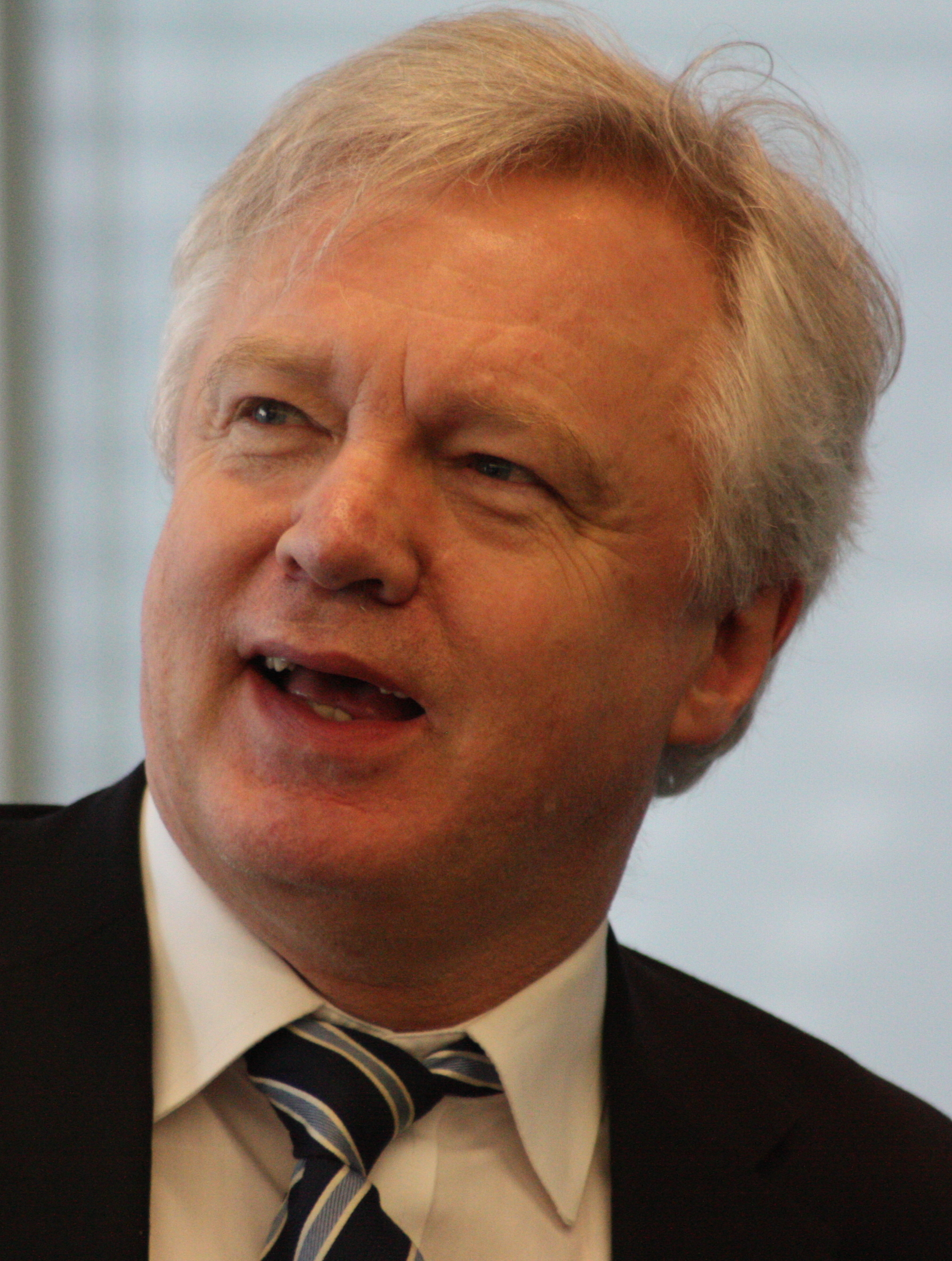
David Davis
MP for Haltemprice and Howden, Shadow Home Secretary

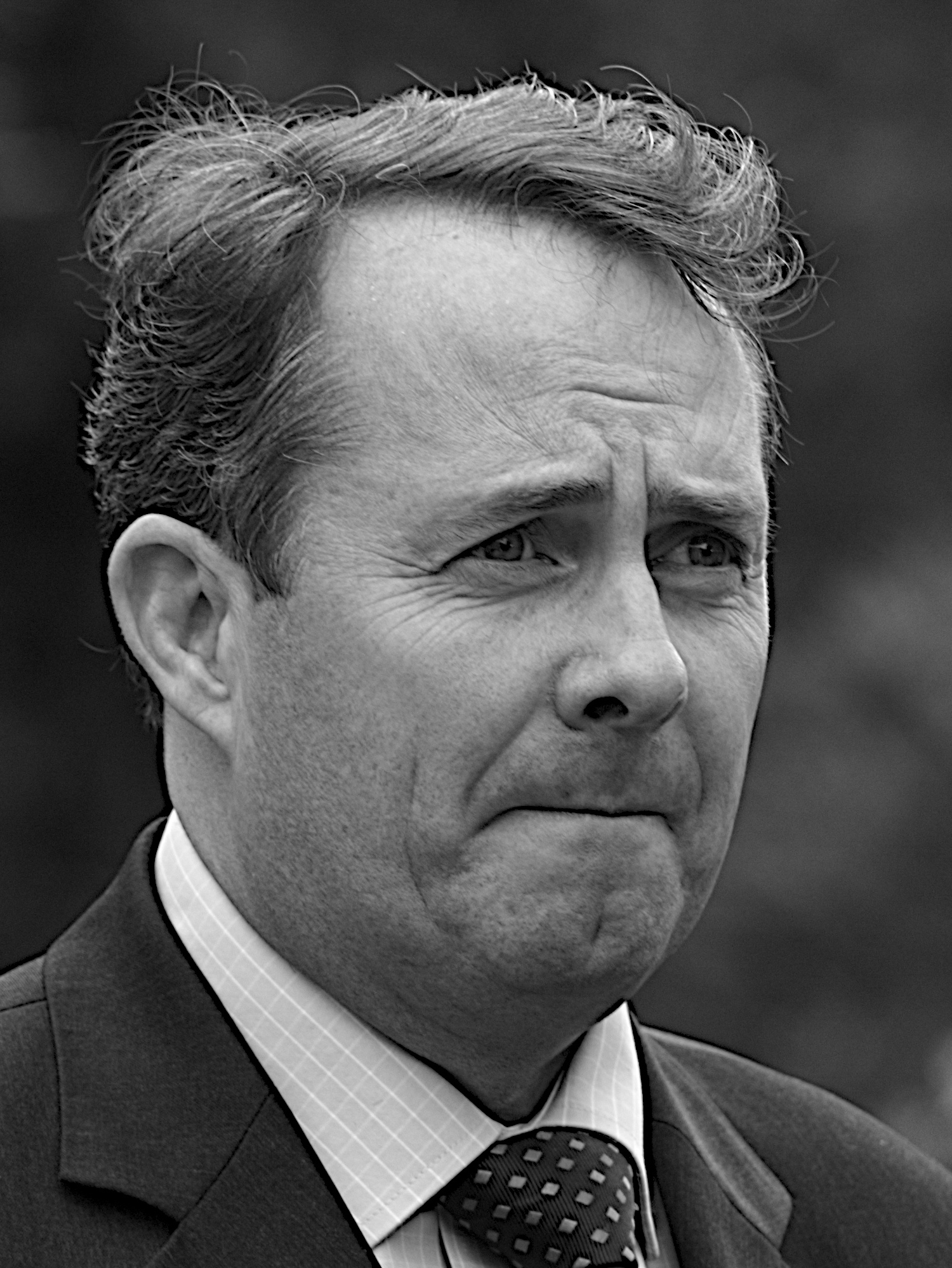
Liam Fox
MP for Woodspring, Shadow Foreign Secretary

Candidates who withdrew

The following candidates declared their intention to seek the leadership, but withdrew before voting began after gathering limited support:

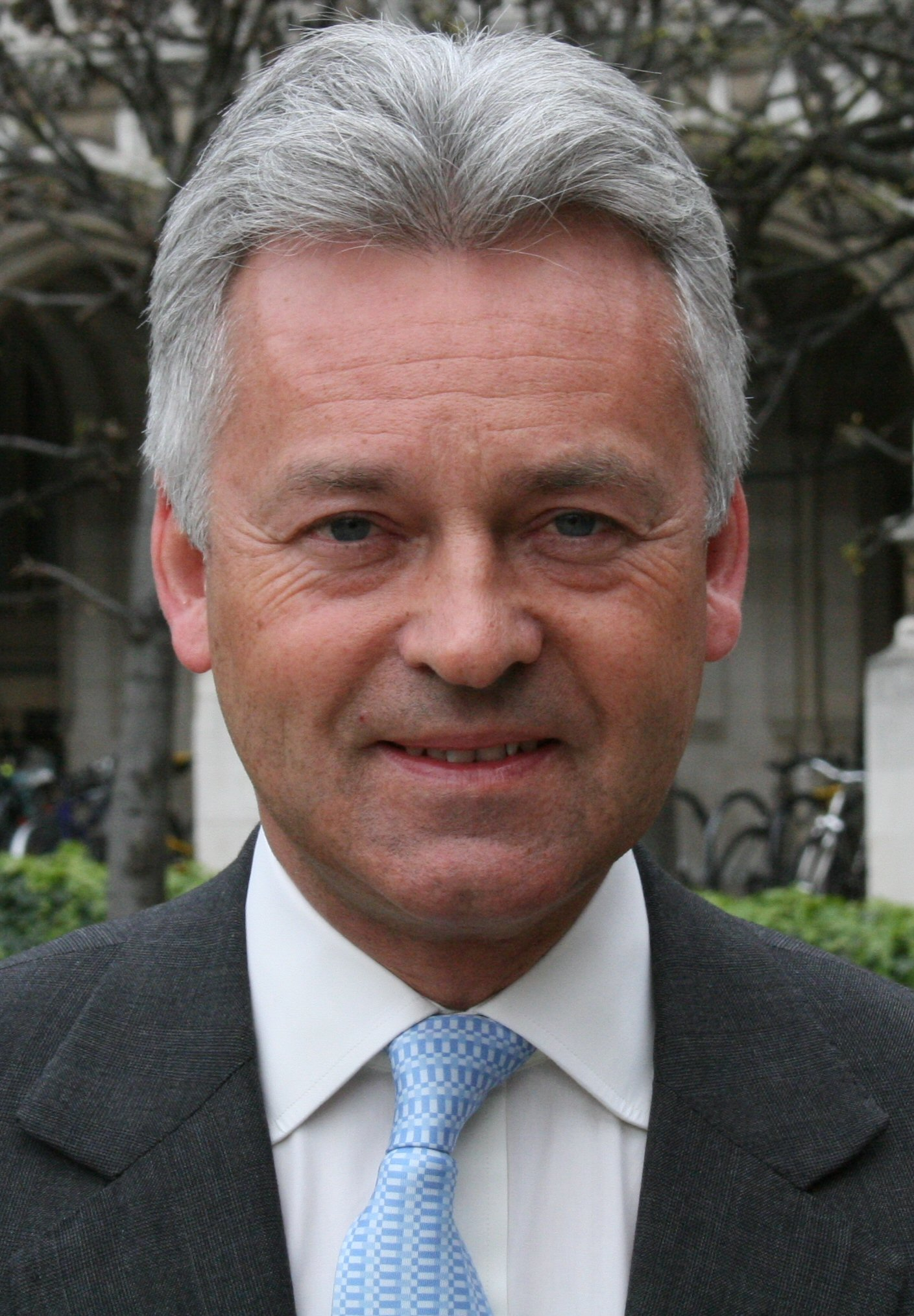
Alan Duncan
MP for Rutland and Melton, Shadow Secretary of State for Transport

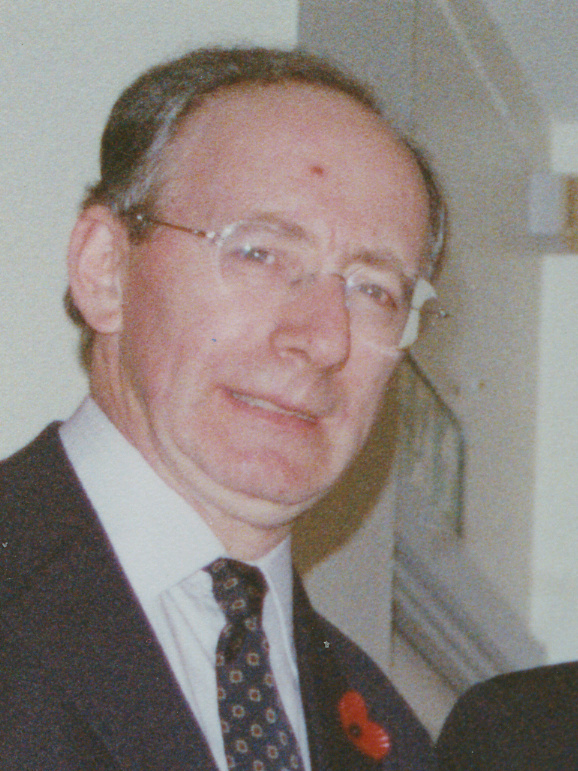
Malcolm Rifkind
MP for Kensington and Chelsea, former Foreign Secretary

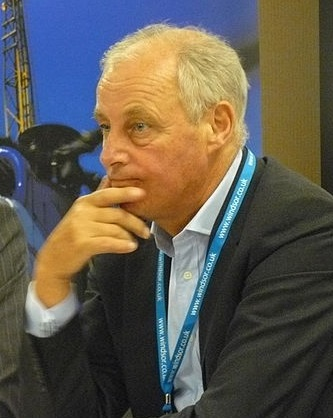
Tim Yeo
MP for South Suffolk, former Environment Minister

== Results ==
The first ballot of MPs was held on 18 October. The results were announced, ten minutes later than expected, at 5:30 pm by Sir Michael Spicer, the Chairman of the 1922 Committee.

Candidate	First ballot: 18 October 2005		Second ballot: 20 October 2005		Members' vote	
Candidate	Votes	%	Votes	%	Votes	%
David Cameron	56	28.3	90	45.5	134,446	67.6
David Davis	62	31.3	57	28.8	64,398	32.4
Liam Fox	42	21.2	51	25.7	Eliminated	
Kenneth Clarke	38	19.2	Eliminated			
Turnout	198	100	198	100	198,844	78.4 (Note: Turnout of 198,884 out of a membership of 253,600)
David Cameron elected

First ballot
There were no abstentions, with all 198 Conservative members voting. Cameron, Davis and Fox went through to the second ballot held on 20 October. The results were announced by the Chairman of the 1922 Committee at 5:30 pm.

Second ballot
Cameron and Davis went through to the runoff vote of the Conservative Party's 300,000 members. The votes were counted on 5 December and the winner, David Cameron, was announced shortly after 15:00 on 6 December.

== The rules of the contest ==
Much speculation surrounded the review of the rules, as it was widely perceived that the system eventually adopted could prove a help or hindrance to particular candidates with strong support in certain areas of the party. However, on 27 September 2005, the proposal to change the rules was rejected.

=== The existing rules ===
Under the rules adopted in 1998, under which both Iain Duncan Smith and Michael Howard were respectively elected in 2001 and 2003, a leadership contest can be initiated either by the incumbent leader resigning or by the Parliamentary Party passing a vote of no confidence in the present leader, the latter being called upon a request by 15% of the Parliamentary Party to the Chairman of the 1922 Committee, who serves ex officio as the returning officer of a leadership election; if a vote of no confidence is passed, a leadership election is called, with the incumbent barred from standing.

Prospective candidates would require nominations from any two of their fellow MPs taking the Conservative whip. Were only one candidate to stand (as happened in the 2003 leadership election), they would have been elected nem con (uncontested); were two candidates to stand, the election would immediately proceed to a ballot of all members of the party. In the event that more than two candidates stood, MPs would hold a series of ballots to reduce the number to two, with the candidate garnering the fewest votes in each round eliminated. (Were two or more candidates to tie for last place, as happened in the 2001 contest, the ballot would immediately proceed to a revote, with all bottom-placed candidates eliminated if the tie still remained.) Candidates would also be permitted to withdraw between rounds (as also happened in the 2001 contest).

Once only two candidates remained, the all-member ballot would be proceeded to, lasting for some weeks, with the candidate topping the poll to be declared leader. To be eligible to vote, an individual would have to have been a paid-up member of the party for at least three months.

==== Criticisms of the existing rules ====
Many prospective criticisms were made of the aforementioned rules, in light of some problems encountered in previous elections:

===== Technical =====
- The provision for resolving a tie was originally lacking and hastily devised during the 2001 election.
- The tie-breaking mechanism was arguably clumsy.
- In the contests in both 1997 (although taking place under previous rules) and 2001, the position of Chairman of the 1922 Committee was vacant for some weeks because the previous holder retired or was defeated in the recent general election. Many felt that this prolonged the contests unnecessarily and called for the Returning Officer to be the bearer of a party office which is unlikely to be vacant in the aftermath of a general election.
- Errors in the party's membership lists could lead to individual members being disenfranchised.

===== Structural =====
Many criticised the system as having been devised to try to answer those who believed that a leader should have the backing of the bulk of MPs, to answer demands for ordinary party members to have a say, and to allow for the removal of a failing leader, with it possible for a candidate to reach the final two with the support of barely a third of MPs in the final ballot (or even less if the rival candidate has overwhelming support in the Parliamentary Party) and then be elected leader by the party members; conversely, an incumbent leader is perpetually vulnerable to being removed by the MPs. Additionally, some argued that the party membership was unrepresentative of the electorate at large and thus prone to elect a leader reflecting only their views rather than those of the country at large.

=== Proposals to change the leadership election process ===
==== Initial proposals for electing a new leader ====
Following the Conservative Party's defeat at the 2005 general election, in a speech on 6 May 2005, Howard announced his intention to resign as leader of the Conservative Party. However, he indicated that before he stood down, he wanted to oversee changes to the party's process of electing a new leader. These new proposals were set out in principle in the Conservative Party document, A 21st Century Party:

1. To be validly nominated, candidates would require the support of 10 per cent of Conservative MPs.
2. If one candidate was nominated by over half of the Parliamentary Party, they would automatically be declared leader.
3. If no candidate was nominated by over half of the Parliamentary Party, each candidate would address and answer questions from the National Convention. The convention would then vote, with the result of this election being published.
4. The MPs would then make the final choice, with it being for the 1922 Committee to determine how they would do this under the condition that the candidate who received the most votes from the National Convention would be guaranteed a place in each ballot, including the final ballot.
5. Candidates would be allowed to spend up to £25,000 from the opening of nominations, with the Party Treasurer responsible for raising this money for each candidate, and any money raised from other sources to be deducted from the money they receive from the Party Treasurer.

This proposal was put to the 1922 Committee on 15 May 2005, but rejected. About 100 of the 180 backbenchers that attended the meeting instead endorsed a motion drawn up by the executive of the committee, proposing instead to hold a consultative period with all local associations, but leave the choice of leader to be ultimately decided by the parliamentary party.

==== Revised proposals for electing a new leader ====
Under the 1922 Committee's proposed system, Sir Michael Spicer, Chairman of the 1922 Committee, would seek nominations for leader from Conservative MPs. Contenders would need the support of 5% of the party, or 10 MPs (in the 2005 Parliament), in order to stand. Once nominations had closed, MPs would then start a two-week consultation process with their constituencies, MEPs and local councillors to ascertain their preferred candidates. They would then report back to Spicer, who would assess their findings and inform MPs of the two candidates who had gained the most support, in order of preference. MPs would then hold the first ballot, in which all nominated candidates would be able to participate. As in the existent system, the MP with the lowest number of votes would be eliminated. The process would then be repeated, as required, until one candidate remained.

Andrew Tyrie, the Conservative MP for Chichester, hailed the decision by the parliamentary party to accept the new proposal by 127 votes to 50 at the 20 July 2005 meeting of the 1922 committee as a "victory for common sense". The 1922 Committee proposal was then put to the Conservative Party Board, which duly supported it. Following this result, Party Chairman Francis Maude commented: "I am pleased that these changes, agreed by the Party Board and the 1922 Committee, are going to be put forward. If these changes go through, the Conservative Party will have a new Leader in place by the middle of November." However, other MPs were less enthusiastic about the proposed system; in a letter to the Daily Telegraph, a number of MPs, including David Willetts, Michael Ancram, Andrew Lansley, Theresa May and Iain Duncan Smith, wrote: "It is not too late for the parliamentary party to find a way of involving grassroots members in the Conservative Party’s most important decisions. Any proposals that do not facilitate democratic involvement deserve to be defeated."

==== Proposal not backed by the Constitutional College ====
When the results of the ballot of the Constitutional College (Note: Constitutional college has a total of 1,141 members and is made up of MPs, MEPs, the officers of the Association of Conservative Peers, frontbench spokesmen in the Lords, and members of The National Conservative Convention (Association Chairmen, area and regional officers, members of the Board and other senior volunteers).) of the Conservative Party were announced on 27 September 2005, the proposal had failed to gain enough backing. With a total of 1,001 (87.7% of full membership) ballots were returned, the votes in each section were:

Proposal for electing a new leader
Option	MPs		Volunteers		Peers and MEPs		Total
Option	Votes	%	Votes	%	Votes	%	%
For ✓	132	71.4	446	58.4	33	63.6	61.0
Against	53	28.6	317	41.5	19	36.5	39.0

This equated to a total of 61 per cent of the constitutional college in favour. For the changes to be approved, 50 per cent of all those eligible to vote were required to vote in favour, along with 66 per cent of MPs who voted and 66 per cent of the National Convention members who voted; it is this final threshold that was not reached. As a result of this failure in the Constitutional College ballot, no changes were made to the party's rules on electing a leader.

== Timeline of events ==
- 6 May 2005 – In the aftermath of the 2005 general election Michael Howard announces that there will be a review of the rules for electing a leader and that once this review is complete he will stand down. Shadow Chancellor Oliver Letwin immediately confirms he will not be standing.
- 10 May 2005 – Michael Howard unveils the new shadow cabinet with most potential leadership candidates in key positions. Much speculation surrounds the appointment of George Osborne as Shadow Chancellor – facing Gordon Brown, widely expected to become the next leader of the Labour Party.
- 20 May 2005 – George Osborne rules himself out of the leadership contest.
- 21 May 2005 – A survey of local party chairmen in Conservative held seats finds that the majority of respondents are happy for MPs to select the leader.
- 22 May 2005 – Former Deputy Prime Minister Michael Heseltine declares that he believes Kenneth Clarke is the best candidate to lead the party, but that Clarke is "anguishing" over whether to stand.
- 22 May 2005 – David Davis is reported to be undecided about whether to stand, stating that he always made his mind up about "these things at the last possible minute".
- 23 May 2005 – Andrew Lansley calls for the party to radically reform itself, calling for the description "Reform Conservatives" to be used. He states he is undecided about whether or not to stand for the leadership.
- 24 May 2005 – Former leader Iain Duncan Smith cautions against proposals to remove grassroots members' say in the selection of the leader.
- 25 May 2005 – A consultation document on party reforms is formally circulated, including proposals to change the way the leader is elected, giving the final say to MPs and withdrawing the all-party member ballot.
- 27 May 2005 – Kenneth Clarke is reported to be contemplating a leadership bid. Many commentators believe that Clarke's position on the European Union will hinder a bid, as on previous occasions.
- 29 May 2005 – A referendum in France rejects the EU Constitution. Many commentators believe that this makes it likely that the constitution will no longer be an issue in UK politics that this removes a major obstacle to a Clarke leadership.
- 1 June 2005 – A referendum in the Netherlands also rejects the Constitution, reinforcing mounting speculation that the Constitution will be abandoned and that this in turn makes Kenneth Clarke a more viable contender.
- 2 June 2005 – Iain Duncan Smith calls for the next leader to be from "the mainstream of Eurosceptic opinion" in what is seen as a dismissal of Kenneth Clarke.
- 2 June 2005 – David Willetts calls for the party to place a greater focus on social justice and a stronger society.
- 5 June 2005 – In a series of articles and interviews David Davis sets out his vision of the Conservative Party, emphasising the need to maintain its traditional values.
- 5 June 2005 – Kenneth Clarke declares that he believes the Constitution "plainly is no more".
- 8 June 2005 – Sir Malcolm Rifkind states that it is "quite likely" he will stand for the leadership.
- 9 June 2005 – Crispin Blunt, MP for Reigate, resigns as a Whip in order to support Rifkind's bid.
- 10 June 2005 – Alan Duncan becomes the first candidate to confirm his desire to seek the leadership.
- 13 June 2005 – Tim Yeo states in an interview that he feels there are "too many" candidates for the leadership and calls for the "plethora of would-be leaders" from the party's liberal wing to unite around a single candidate.
- 14 June 2005 – Former Prime Minister Margaret Thatcher calls for the party "to return to first principles."
- 15 June 2005 – At a meeting of the 1922 Backbench Committee Conservative MPs holds an indicative vote on several proposed options for electing the leader. A system where MPs select the leader with a formal consultation of members is the preferred option.
- 16 June 2005 – Theresa May calls for the party to select high calibre candidates for their 100 top target seats, including 50 women.
- 16 June 2005 – In an interview David Cameron "hints" at a leadership bid.
- 17 June 2005 – High-profile Conservative MP Boris Johnson says that he will back Cameron.
- 18 June 2005 – Ian Taylor, widely seen as a key ally of Kenneth Clarke, indicates that David Davis could be the person to unify all wings of the party. Another Clarke ally, David Curry, however suggests that Clarke is the best qualified candidate.
- 19 June 2005 – Kenneth Clarke declares that he is "keen" to run for the leadership, though notes that there will be some months in which to make a final decision.
- 29 June 2005 – David Cameron makes a speech entitled "We're all in it together" in which he sets out his views on the future of the party and calls for families and married couples to receive greater support from the government.
- 29 June 2005 – Two former Party Treasurers declare support for different candidates in the Evening Standard. Lord Harris supports David Cameron whilst Lord Kalms supports David Davis.
- 1 July 2005 – Kenneth Clarke declares that he has sufficient support in the parliamentary party to be nominated for the leadership and that he will be a candidate "unless it becomes clear by the autumn that I don't have a serious prospect".
- 3 July 2005 – Oliver Letwin declares his support for David Cameron, increasing the latter's chances of being the main challenger from the left of the party.
- 5 July 2005 – Michael Ancram warns that removing ordinary members' say in electing a leader will not make the party more attractive to voters.
- 6 July 2005 – Conservative MPs at a meeting of the 1922 Backbench Committee agree a system whereby a candidate with the support of 5% of MPs (currently 10 MPs) could stand and with a consultative poll of constituency party chairmen, who would each put forward two names, but with MPs making the final decisions.
- 18 July 2005 – Alan Duncan rules himself out of the leadership race in an article in The Guardian.
- 18 July 2005 – As Duncan withdraws, Theresa May states, "I will be thinking about whether to stand."
- 19 July 2005 – A survey of primarily Conservative Party members and supporters reveals that there is strong support for MPs making the final decision but also strong support for ordinary party members having a formal say in the process. The same survey finds David Davis to be the most popular choice amongst respondents.
- 21 July 2005 – MPs finish voting on proposals to change the rules and back a system that gives them the final say. Objections to removing the role of grassroots members are made by the Campaign for Conservative Democracy and by prominent Conservative MPs including Theresa May, Andrew Lansley, Iain Duncan Smith, Michael Ancram and David Willets.
- 27 August 2005 – Tim Yeo announces that he will not stand as the leader of the Conservative Party as he thinks that the Pro-European Kenneth Clarke is the best candidate to succeed Michael Howard as Conservative leader. He said that he would not stand but he would support Kenneth Clarke through the Leadership Election.
- 31 August 2005 – Following a day of expectation Kenneth Clarke formally launches his bid. Supporters at his press conference include Ann Widdecombe, John Bercow and Tim Yeo.
- 5 September 2005 – Liam Fox declares his intention to stand as leader of the Conservative party.
- 27 September 2005 – Proposal to change the rules for electing a new leader is rejected.
- 29 September 2005 – David Davis and David Cameron both officially launch their election campaigns.
- 3 October 2005 – Andrew Lansley rules himself out of the contest, citing a lack of support.
- 5 October 2005 – Deputy Leader Michael Ancram rules himself out of the contest, citing a lack of support. He also announces he will return to the backbenches when the new leader is elected.
- 11 October 2005 – Sir Malcolm Rifkind announces that he will no longer stand in the contest for the leadership, and backs Kenneth Clarke.
- 12 October 2005 – Theresa May rules herself out of the contest, and backs David Cameron.
- 12 October 2005 – It is reported that the Cornerstone Group of right-wing Conservative MPs will not field a candidate of their own, otherwise expected to be Edward Leigh, but will instead support Liam Fox.
- 18 October 2005 – Kenneth Clarke is eliminated in the first ballot of MPs.
- 20 October 2005 – Liam Fox is eliminated in the second ballot of MPs.
- 13 November 2005 – Former Conservative leader William Hague declares his support for Cameron in an article written for the News of the World.
- 6 December 2005 – David Cameron's victory announced.

=== Election timetable ===
- 7 October: Nominations open
- 13 October: Nominations close
- 18 October: First ballot of MPs
- 20 October: Second ballot of MPs
- Subsequent Tuesdays and Thursdays: Further ballots of MPs if required, until only two candidates remain
- 5 December: Members' ballot closes
- 6 December: Result announced

== Party Conference ==
At the 2005 Conservative Party conference, each of the five announced candidates at the time was allowed a 20-minute speech. This was seen by many as the start of the leadership campaign by each of the candidates and their speeches were closely analysed by party members and the media. Many felt that front-runner (at the time of his speech) David Davis had performed rather poorly, while the speeches of Kenneth Clarke, Liam Fox, Sir Malcolm Rifkind and David Cameron were much better. This led to a rapid change in the odds of the five candidates on the betting markets – on the morning of 6 October, David Davis was the clear leader and David Cameron third, but by the evening of the same day the two had swapped places. By the end of the conference, David Cameron had become the front runner, with Kenneth Clarke and David Davis closely behind.

The conference was also seen as similar to the Conservatives' 1963 conference, where there was also a race to become leader.

== Polling ==
The Sunday Times and YouGov polled 746 members of the Conservative Party just after the conference. The poll showed support slipping away from David Davis (14%) and Kenneth Clarke (26%) and moving to Liam Fox (13%) and David Cameron (39%) instead.

The Daily Telegraph and YouGov polled 665 members of the Conservative Party just after the first ballot, where Clarke was eliminated leaving only three contestants. The poll showed that 59 per cent backed David Cameron, against 18 per cent for Liam Fox and 15 per cent for Davis. This poll showed support for Cameron being strong amongst the grassroots of the party on the eve of the final (membership) ballot.

In a YouGov poll published on 12 November, more than two-thirds of party members looked set to vote for the younger candidate as party leader. Around 68 per cent of voters who had already returned their ballot papers had opted for Cameron, while 66 per cent of those still to vote said they were likely to choose him over the then-Shadow Home Secretary David Davis. 57 per cent of those still to vote said they may change their minds between then and the postal ballot deadline on 5 December.

== See also ==
- 2005 Scottish Conservative Party leadership election
