= Something of the night about him =

1997 British political comment

The phrase "something of the night about him" was a comment by UK Conservative Party politician Ann Widdecombe on her colleague Michael Howard in 1997. The two had previously worked together at the Home Office in the second Major ministry, where he was home secretary and she was prisons minister. In 1995, their relationship broke down when Widdecombe accused Howard of mistreating the director general of HM Prison Service, Derek Lewis.

Two years later, following the Conservative Party's losses at the 1997 general election, when Howard stood for leader of the party, Widdecombe made a speech in parliament. Using the phrase to illustrate, in her view, Howard's worst personality traits, it caught the popular imagination and has been credited as contributing to Howard's failure to win. Since then, the phrase has been reused and adapted—including by Howard himself—for other circumstances, and has been considered by academics from a philosophical, historical and linguistic dimension.

== Background ==
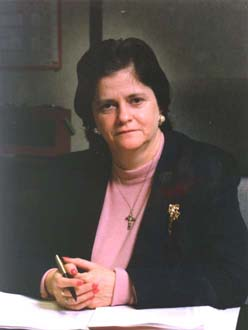
Ann Widdecombe, official portrait, 1995–1997

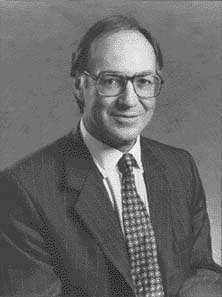
Michael Howard as Home Secretary, official portrait

Following the 1997 general election, which resulted in the Conservative Party suffering a crushing defeat to the Labour Party, the Conservative leader, John Major, had resigned. This necessitated a leadership election, which Major called immediately following the election. The candidates who eventually ran were Kenneth Clarke, previously chancellor of the exchequer; William Hague, then secretary of state for Wales; Michael Howard, home secretary; Peter Lilley, social security secretary; and John Redwood, a backbencher.

Howard was supported by several former ministers in the Major administration, including Francis Maude and David Davis. Widdecombe, as Prisons Minister, previously worked under Howard at the Home Office, where she had "repeatedly clashed" with him. On one occasion she called him "dangerous stuff".

== "Something of the night about him" ==
Relations between Widdecombe and Howard had been poor ever since they publicly clashed in the House of Commons over the sacking of Derek Lewis in 1995, when Widdecombe accused her boss of misleading the House. Widdecombe had felt increasingly guilty regarding her failure to resign ever since. In 1997, in the words of Michael Crick, "Howard's emergence as a leadership contender gave her a chance to atone for what she now regarded as her earlier cowardice". (Note: In her 1997 Commons speech she stated, "I nearly resigned, and now regret not doing so. I put that on record, I now regret not doing so".)

Widdecombe had been considering the phrase for several months and had tested it on several colleagues before using it against Howard. On one occasion, she told the Home Office permanent secretary, "I'm sorry, but there's just something of the night here", and when she realised that the phrase was both easily understood and correctly interpreted, she deliberately used it to damage his leadership prospects. (Note: Widdecombe further explained to BBC Radio Four that she "[t]ried it on a couple of other people who reacted similarly and I thought 'Right, I've got a phrase that people understand'. You only understand a phrase like that if you don't have to explain it.")

On 10 May 1997, in a lobby phone call with the political editor of The Sunday Times, Michael Prescott, she divulged the contents of a planned letter to Major in which she highlighted Howard's faults. In this conversation she mentioned that Howard had "something of the night about him". Widdecombe deliberately repeated the remark several times and, notwithstanding that the call was off the record, made it clear to Prescott that she would not object to her name being linked to it. Prescott's article duly appeared in the following day's edition under the headline "Howard Damned by his Minister as Dangerous".

Widdecombe's soundbite caught the imagination of both the media and the public. She repeated the phrase in the Commons in an extensive speech against Howard nine days later. The occasion was the debate on the new government's programme, with Jack Straw presenting the Home Office brief. Straw subsequently recalled, that "the day is not, however, remembered for anything I said, but for Ann Widdecombe's dramatic attack".

The putdown—in her own words, a character assassination—was seen as an attack on Howard's personality, and played into contemporary views that he had "a ruthless streak", was "stern and sinister", abrasive, forbidding and remote. (Note: While a minister under Margaret Thatcher, Howard had earned himself a reputation as a "hardline" right-winger; he had been originally responsible for the Poll Tax and section 28 policies, and coined the phrase "prison works".) Former colleague Phillip Oppenheim has commented that "Howard was a good whipping boy. No one liked him. The press thought he was oleaginous. The Guardian thought he was manically right-wing," while former Conservative party staffer and political commentator Jo-Anne Nadler termed him the party's new "pantomime baddy", replacing Norman Tebbit.

The phrase also reflected Widdecombe's own view—as a practicing Catholic—that he had the Devil in him. (Note: The public relations implications of this were recognised by Howard's own team. Crick argues that his appearance played into that image, with his five o'clock shadow, and what one of his campaigners called his "forced smile which was meant to look friendly but that came across as a smirk".) There was some contemporary criticism that the remark was anti-Semitic, what Graham Johnson has called "a faintly anti-Semitic smear of the nasty, whispered type that Howard has had to cope with throughout his career". Widdecombe—a member of the Conservative Friends of Israel group—denied this "robustly", although the journalist Melvin J. Lasky has suggested that her phrasing—"I can kibosh that"—was "a tad tasteless". It was also suggested that the imagery of Dracula drew attention to Howard's Transylvanian ancestry. (Note: His parents were Romanian Jewish refugees.)

== Impact ==
Widdecombe's attack has been described as both memorable and devastating by the political commentator Thomas Quinn, and at the time The Sun claimed it was the "most savage attack ever seen in the Commons". (Note: Although Andrew Crick suggests that actually the comment came as an anti-climax to the session.) Conversely, Lasky called it "neither witty nor aphoristic". It is one of the few speeches that tangibly change the political landscape. (Note: Akin to Geoffrey Howe's attack on Thatcher in his resignation speech.) The political commentator Iain Dale described her speech as courageous, as she must have known that it could have led to the end of her political career.

Her phrase was first reported in The Times in a report of a private conversation she had had with friends, although the paper underplayed it in favour of the "dangerous stuff" quote. Howard's response in an article in The Spectator deliberately focussed on the latter criticism, as it was one which could be turned into a positive trait, that of strong leadership. Regarding the "something of the night" quote, Howard joked that she had seen into the "diabolic darkness of my own inner soul". A week after Widdecombe's comments, on 19 May, he joked self-deprecatingly about it again in the Commons when he accused Labour Home Secretary Jack Straw of emulating Tory policy:

It has been suggested that I have something of the night about my character. It is, of course, well known in folklore that creatures of the night have no reflection, so hon. Members will understand my relief as I look across the Dispatch box and see my reflection smiling back at me.

Graham Brady, then the youngest Conservative MP and who had been elected in the recent election supported Howard's leadership bid. He later recalled how, after Hague won, he received a copy of Bram Stoker's Dracula from Howard, who had inscribed it "with thanks for your support in the Creature of the Night Campaign. Yours, Michael."

=== Contemporary reactions ===
Widdecombe's colleagues had other interpretations. To Emily Blatch, it indicated that Howard's character was "not as it seems". Oppenheim admired the "well-crafted" soundbite, saying she "carried it off brilliantly. She turned herself from being a fringe middle-ranking politician, whom no one had very much time for and who was considered a right-wing weirdo, into being a chat show character, with something to her." Howard's response was to go "hopping mad".

Conservative MP Jerry Hayes suggested that Widdecombe's phrase "struck a chord" with the public. He also wrote approvingly of the subsequent sketch by impressionist Rory Bremner, in which Bremner compared Howard to Dracula. Labour MP Chris Mullin wrote in his diary that Widdecombe "put the boot into Howard ... skilfully and with uncharacteristic humour". He also believed that it was not the knock-out punch it was intended to be, and that "she has inflicted as much damage on herself as on him. And he, unlike her, will live to fight another day."

Jack Straw believed Widdecombe's "eight words was all it took to place her victim in a political coma from which it took six years to recover". The columnist William Safire compared it to the albatross. Straw's Senior Policy adviser and speech writer at the time, Norman Warner, felt that "there was something odd about a pro-hanging, anti-abortion, anti-divorce, anti-feminist and no sex before marriage protagonist becoming a heroine of the liberal press".

== Origin of the phrase ==
Widdecombe later stated that she had got the phrase from the title of a 1980 detective novel by Mary McMullen. Kachon suggests that, with the obscurity of the author, and the importance of her religion to her, a more likely source for the phrase was evangelical Christianity, where night is a symbol of, or metaphor for, the satanic. Other possible sources have been discovered. The literary critic Lewis E. Gates, discussing the novels of Nathaniel Hawthorne suggested that they demonstrated the author "had in fact something of the night in his disposition" in 1900. Henri-Frédéric Amiel's Intimate Journal of 1886 mentions the protagonist considering a "bizarre formula, which seems to have something of the night still clinging about it". A collection of poetry by George Chapman opened with a Latin epitaph, versus mei habebunt aliquantum noctis, roughly translating to "my verses will have something of the night".

== Aftermath ==
Although "widely credited with destroying" Howard's election chances, the political scientist Tim Bale has suggested that while Widdecombe's comment undoubtedly damaged Howard's campaign, it was not necessarily fatal to it, although "highly bruising" and injurious. What was fatal, Bale suggests, was not her remarks but the Howard team's response, which involved off the record insinuations about her, (Note: Widdecombe accused the Howard campaign of spreading rumours that she had supported Derek Lewis against Howard because "she had been wooed with flowers, chocolates and dinners" by Lewis.) and that they began referring to her publicly as "Doris Karloff".

However, many believed his reputation was harmed by the comment, although the London Evening Standard suggested that "some might have taken this as flattery"; the accusation was one that he would find hard to shake off. Not everyone believed she was right. Phillip Oppenheim says Widdecombe showed an "unpleasant and opportunist" side over Howard, and that in his view "what she did was highly personal, highly unpleasant, very self-serving’".

Some years later, Widdecombe told The Guardian, "I have said all I have to say about that. I don't want to reprise that ... not at all", but also called it "the quote of all time". In the same paper—and by which time Widdecombe was endorsing Howard as Conservative leader—political journalist Jackie Ashley said, "as political insults go, it was simply the best". Widdecombe's phrase later entered The Oxford Dictionary of Political Quotations, and in Kochan's words, "the pantheon of put-downs".

In 2001, when Howard was Shadow Chancellor, he paraphrased Widdecombe's comment against Tony Blair and Chancellor Gordon Brown, saying of their then-strained relationship, there was "something of goodnight" about them. Two years later, when Howard was party leader, he sacked his Shadow Secretary of State for International Development, John Bercow for congratulating Prime Minister Tony Blair's stance on the Iraq War. Bercow subsequently told Howard to his face that Widdecombe "was right" to make the remark she did because, Bercow felt, "the party needs to be attractive, but you are not seen as being attractive" or empathetic.

Following her retirement in 2010, Widdecombe took up writing detective fiction. Reviewing one of her books, the author Ruth Rendell wrote, although "imbued with moral rectitude ... it wasn't easy to put down"; playing on Widdecombe's 1997 phrase, Rendell wrote that Widdecombe "has something of a Sunday afternoon about her".

== Analysis ==
"Something of the night" has been described by the philosopher Simon Kirchin as a thick concept, or one that both describes while simultaneously being emotionally loaded. The psychoanalyst Erik Erikson suggested that "when one politician says of another 'there is something of the night about him', it does not require great insight to suspect that the speaker is projecting an aspect of herself". In the context of the damage it may have done to Howard's campaign, it has also been considered an example of how figurative political phrasing can have intentional practical consequences.

It also reflects a popular association between high politics and the dark arts, with high politics having a similar "secretive, obscure and almost occult character". (Note: Other examples are the British press's repeated comparisons of Peter Mandelson with the Prince of Darkness, the popularisation of the song "Ding-Dong! The Witch Is Dead" following Thatcher's death in 2013, Clare Short's description of both Mandelson and Alastair Campbell as "people who live in the dark", and the comparison of Howard to Dracula, which saw the Daily Mirror run a photo mock up of him wearing an opera coat and fangs.) Safire argued that Widdecombe's phrase had become a soubriquet akin to Richard Nixon and used-car salesman, Jimmy Carter and malaise and Bill Clinton with Slick Willie. Safire also notes that the phrase has entered the lexicon, being reused in later and varied contexts, such as the Sunday Times suggesting that Mick Jagger "has still managed to keep something of the night about him" and The Guardian that a talk show host's voice had "more than something of the night about it".
