= Look (UK magazine) =

Defunct British glossy fashion and celebrity weekly magazine

- Editor: Gilly Ferguson
- Categories: Fashion, celebrity
- Frequency: Weekly
- Circulation: 116,024 (ABC Jul – Dec 2015); Print and digital editions.
- Publisher: Tammi Iley
- First issue: February 2007
- Final issue: 29 May 2018
- Company: TI Media
- Country: United Kingdom
- Language: English
- Website: http://www.look.co.uk

Look was a glossy high street fashion and celebrity weekly magazine for young women that ran for eleven years (2007–2018). It was published by TI Media, and edited by Gilly Ferguson. The magazine focused on fashion, high street shopping advice, celebrity style and news, and real-life stories.

== History ==
Launched in February 2007, Look delivered a debut ABC of 318,907, making it the most successful launch in 17 years. It was a weekly high-street fashion magazine for women. One of its most popular franchises was High Street Hottest, which showcased the latest products to hit the high street.

Look.co.uk was launched in 2008. It showcased high-street fashion, beauty and celebrity style news.

Rated number 14 out of 22 for the second half of 2013, Look magazine offered fashion, shopping and beauty advice for the average woman, as well as celebrity gossip. The magazine also presented news coverage of well-known people in the media. It also used models with more average sized bodies to show off fashion.

As conducted by the Audit Bureau of Circulation in July to December 2013, the magazine company received a total of 187,884 readers, whereas the National Readership Survey reported 487,000 during October 2012 to September 2013. In the six months from July to December the circulation of Look had fallen to 116,024

It was announced that the Look magazine would be discontinued and the final issue was issued on 29 May 2018.

== Events ==
Look magazine covered events including the Cannes Film Festival, The Academy Awards, New York Fashion Week, London Fashion Week, Paris Fashion Week, The Glamour Awards, BBC Teen Awards, CinemaCon, Britain’s Got Talent, AMFAR Gala, AFI Life Achievement Awards, and many others.

The magazine company hosted the Look Reader Event. It was an exclusive event, in which those attending received manicures, makeup, and massages. Free tickets were offered for those who were interested and over the age of 18. It was held for a week in July and August 2011 in London and Liverpool in England. The event allowed attendees to try on name brand clothing, in which a photographer snapped their picture sporting the clothes for keepsakes.

As a way to look for new styles and interact with its readers, Look hosted blog competitions open to the public. Winners from the last competition held in 2011 received VIP tickets to the Look Show AW11, which was in collaboration with Westfield Stratford City.

== Credits ==
The original editor of Look was Ali Hall. Kate Stephens was the editor of the online edition. Gilly Ferguson took over as Editor-in-Chief of both Look print magazine and Look.co.uk in 2015.
