= 2001 Conservative Party leadership election =

- 8 June – 13 September 2001
- Turnout: 78.3% ( 0.0 pp)
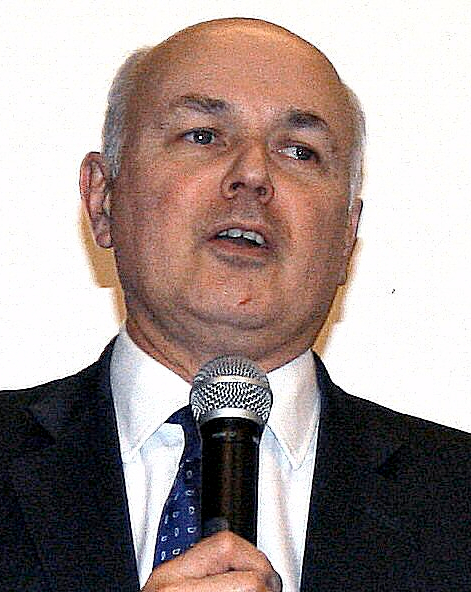

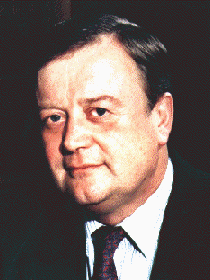

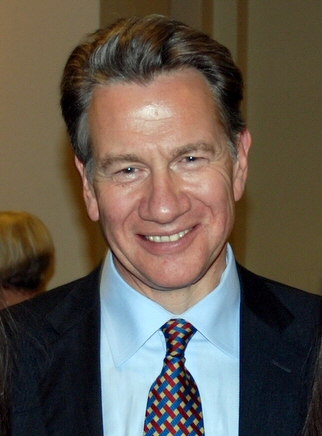

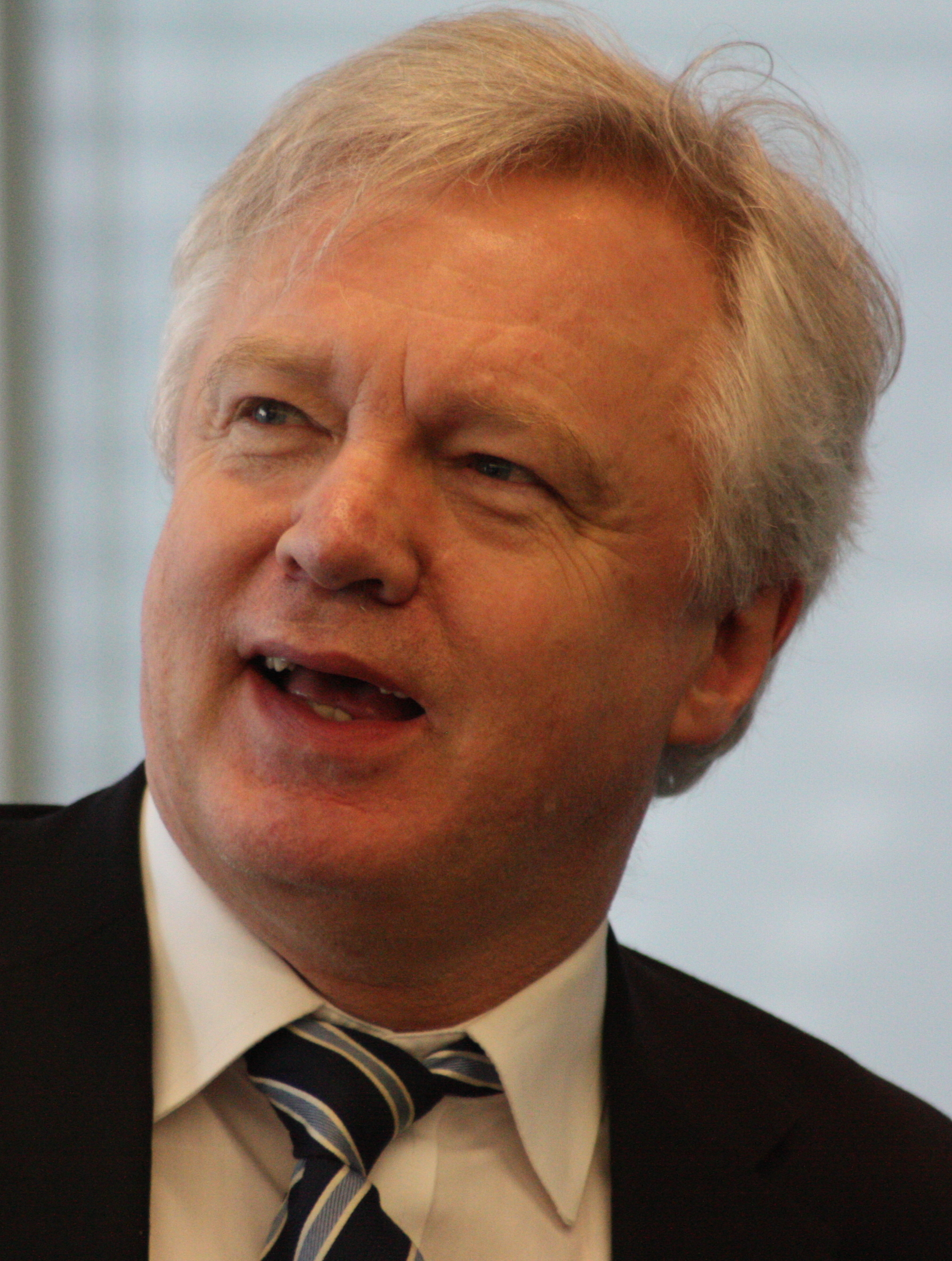

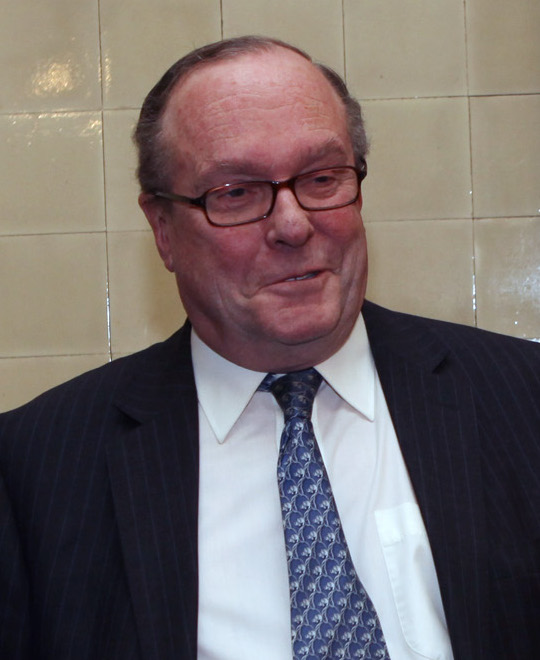
Candidate	Iain Duncan Smith	Kenneth Clarke	Michael Portillo
First ballot	39 (23.5%)	36 (21.6%)	49 (29.5%)
Second ballot	42 (25.3%)	39 (23.6%)	50 (30.1%)
Third ballot	54 (32.5%)	59 (35.5%)	53 (32.0%)
Members' vote	155,993 (60.7%)	100,864 (39.3%)	Eliminated
Candidate	David Davis	Earl of Ancram
First ballot	21 (12.7%)	21 (12.7%)
Second ballot	18 (10.8%)	17 (10.2%)
Third ballot	Withdrew	Eliminated
Members' vote	Withdrew	Eliminated
Leader before election
William Hague
Elected Leader
Iain Duncan Smith

The 2001 Conservative Party leadership election was held after the party failed to make inroads into the Labour government's lead in the 2001 general election. Party leader William Hague resigned, and a leadership contest was called under new rules Hague had introduced. Five candidates came forward: Michael Ancram, David Davis, Kenneth Clarke, Iain Duncan Smith and Michael Portillo. This was the first Conservative Party leadership election held under new rules.

Duncan Smith was announced winner of the election on 13 September 2001, serving until 2003, and Ancram was subsequently awarded the Deputy Leadership, serving until 2005.

== Candidates and their platforms ==
Ancram stood declaring that none of the other candidates were close to his form of Conservatism, as well as arguing that he was best placed to unite the party. As the party chairman for the previous three years, he was widely seen as the candidate who best represented a continuity in the direction of the Hague years.

Clarke had previously stood in the 1997 leadership election but had otherwise maintained a low profile in the subsequent four years. It was argued that his non-involvement in the party's election campaign meant that he was free from blame. His manifesto involved taking a softer line on the European Union, allowing a free vote on many issues, while concentrating heavily on the economy and public services.

Davis was very much an outsider candidate, not having served on the front bench under Hague, though he had served as a junior Minister in the government of John Major. As Chairman of the House of Commons Public Accounts Committee in the previous Parliament he had gained a good reputation at Westminster, and his relatively unknown profile among the electorate was argued to be an asset.

Duncan Smith stood as the standard bearer of the Thatcherite wing of the party, arguing the need for the party to stick to its principles and take a hard line on the European Union, while making use of the talents of all sections of the party.

Portillo ran on a somewhat socially liberal manifesto, calling for the party to reform and reach out to groups not normally associated with the party, calling for greater involvement of women, ethnic minorities and homosexuals. His supporters, and the platform, were dubbed "Portilistas". Portillo was the first candidate to declare, and many commentators saw the contest as coming down to whether or not the party agreed with him as his platform proved deeply controversial in some quarters.

=== Prominent Conservatives who did not stand ===
There were several prominent Conservative politicians who did not stand despite speculation by political commentators preceding the election:

- Michael Howard, the former Home Secretary, had stood in the 1997 leadership election but subsequently withdrew from frontline politics and was not at this stage widely considered. He subsequently made a comeback, however, first as Shadow Chancellor of the Exchequer and then as Leader from 2003.
- Francis Maude, the Shadow Foreign Secretary, had been popular with the liberal wing of the party, but after his ally Portillo returned to Parliament the lead shifted. Maude instead ran Portillo's campaign.
- John Redwood, who had stood in both the 1995 and 1997 leadership elections, initially declined to confirm his intentions but eventually decided not to run.
- Malcolm Rifkind, the former Foreign Secretary, had been unsuccessful in his attempt to return to Parliament. Whilst the rules did not actually specify on paper that candidates had to be MPs, political realities meant that a non-MP was not a viable option. (It was because of this that Portillo did not stand in the 1997 leadership election.)
- Ann Widdecombe, the Shadow Home Secretary, took preliminary soundings but found that despite being popular among the full party membership she had limited support in the Parliamentary Party, who voted in the initial rounds. As a result, she decided not to run.

== Contest rules ==
The election was conducted by the 1922 Committee, with that committee's chairman serving as returning officer. As the outgoing chairman, Sir Archie Hamilton, had stood down from Parliament at the election, no returning officer was available for some time until Sir Michael Spicer was elected. This led to calls for the job of Returning Officer to be reallocated in future.

The rules required MPs to vote in a succession of ballots, with the lowest-scoring candidate eliminated each time, until only two candidates remained. MPs could vote for only a single candidate, but could change their vote each time.

== MPs' ballots ==
The first ballot proved problematic. The party rules made no provision for a tie. As a result, Michael Spicer ordered that a fresh ballot be held the next day and declared that if the tie prevailed then both lowest-scoring candidates would be eliminated. On the second ballot, Ancram was eliminated by virtue of placing last. Davis withdrew as the difference between him and the next candidate was greater than Ancram's votes. Both Davis and Ancram endorsed Duncan Smith. By a single vote Portillo was eliminated from the contest on the third ballot.

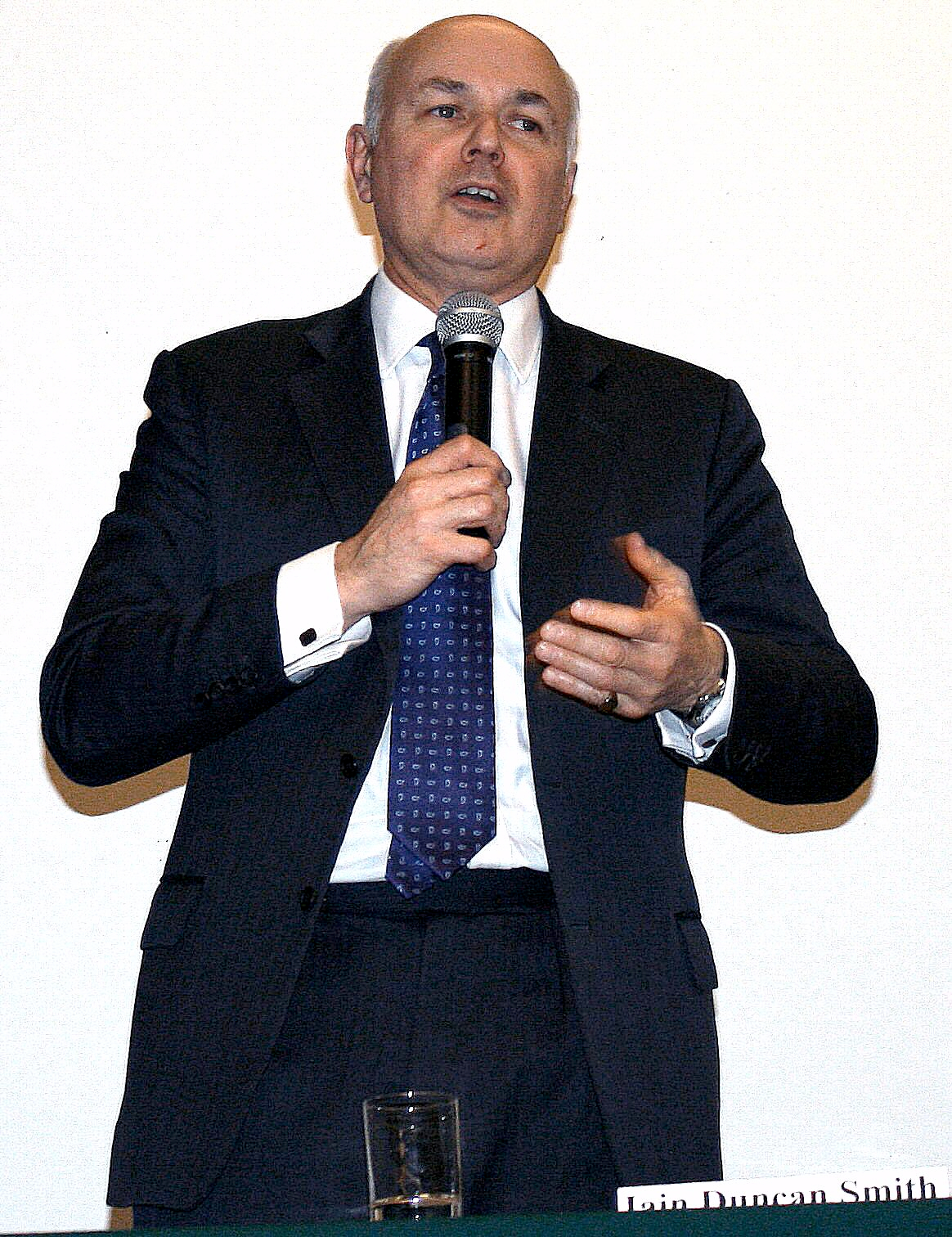
Iain Duncan Smith was elected as the Leader of the Conservative Party.

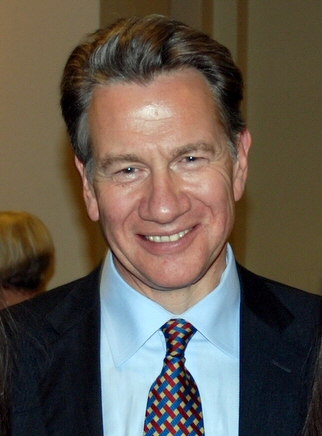
Michael Portillo, who had been seen as a possible successor to John Major, until Portillo lost his seat in the 1997 General Election.

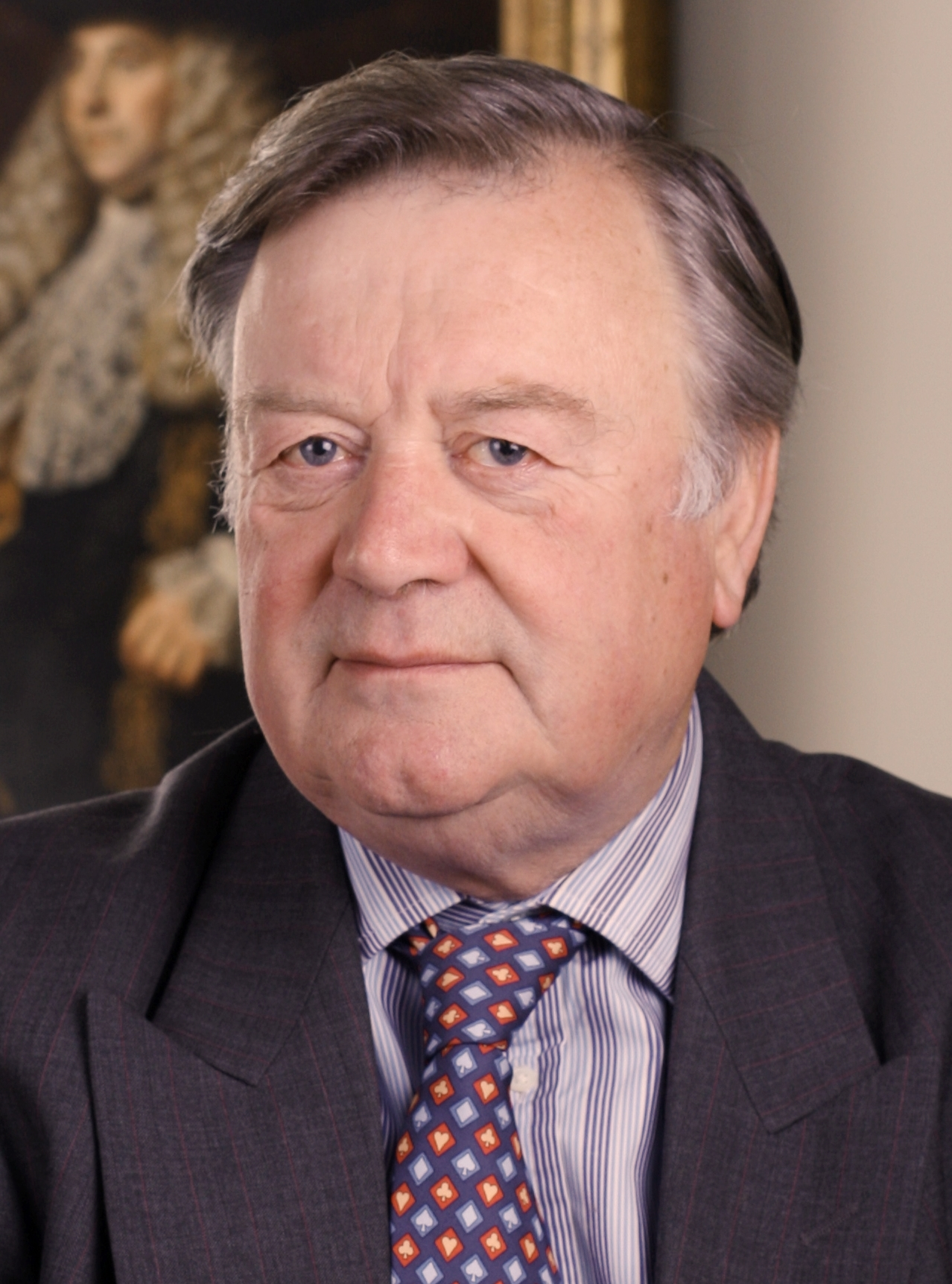
Kenneth Clarke, who advocated for a softer line in regards to the European Union.

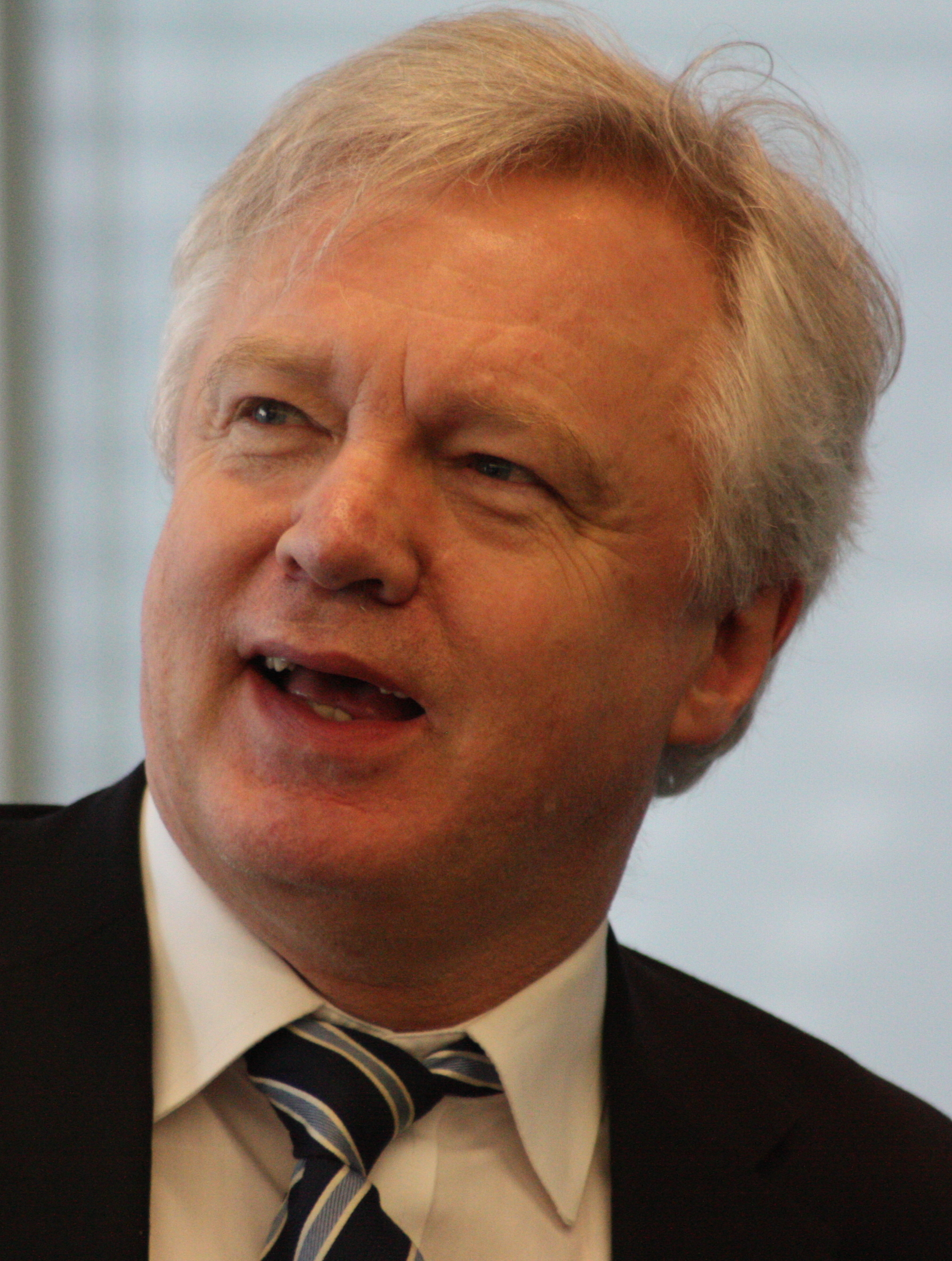
David Davis, who was seen as an outsider candidate.

Candidate	First ballot: 10 July 2001		Second ballot: 12 July 2001		Third ballot: 17 July 2001	
Candidate	Votes	%	Votes	%	Votes	%
Michael Portillo	49	29.5	50	30.1	53	32.0
Iain Duncan Smith	39	23.5	42	25.3	54	32.5
Kenneth Clarke	36	21.6	39	23.6	59	35.5
Michael Ancram	21	12.7	17	10.2	Eliminated	
David Davis	21	12.7	18	10.8	Withdrew	
Turnout	166	100	166	100	166	100

=== Criticisms ===
The MP-only stage of the contest attracted much criticism. Many questioned the validity of MPs eliminating the candidates, potentially denying the ordinary members the opportunity to vote for a favourite candidate (Ann Widdecombe declined to run because she believed she would not reach the last round). Others questioned how it could be claimed that the eventual winner could be assured of support among MPs (the argument often given for previous elections being conducted by MPs only and now for holding these initial rounds) as in the final round each had attracted the support of only a third of the Parliamentary Party. The potential for tactical voting also came in for question. On more technical grounds, the lack of provision of a tie and the delay in appointing a returning officer also sparked concerns, with the former point also leading to ridicule from political opponents.

== Membership vote ==
Duncan Smith and Clarke's names went forward to the full party membership in a three-month contest that was at times acrimonious. Both outgoing leader Hague and Margaret Thatcher endorsed Duncan Smith's candidacy, while John Major endorsed Clarke; Edward Heath, the only other living former Conservative leader did not publicly endorse either of them, but was thought to favour Clarke.

The closing date for ballots was 11 September, but due to the September 11 attacks in the United States, the announcement of the result was delayed until 13 September. Iain Duncan Smith emerged as winner with over 60% of the vote, although without a clear majority among MPs, which many believe hampered the inexperienced leader and led to the events which saw Michael Howard replace him in 2003.

Membership ballot: 11 September 2001
Candidate	Votes	%
Iain Duncan Smith	155,933	60.7
Kenneth Clarke	100,864	39.3
Turnout	256,797	N/A
Iain Duncan Smith elected

== Legacy ==
In hindsight, Iain Duncan Smith's leadership was widely regarded as a disaster for the Conservatives, with the party's poll ratings declining to under 30% at times. After just two years as leader of the Conservative Party, Duncan Smith lost a confidence vote amongst Conservative MPs and was replaced as leader by Michael Howard. Howard went on to lose the 2005 General Election, improving on William Hague's performance in 2001 but still falling some way short of the 209 MPs Labour picked up in their disastrous 1983 campaign. Howard announced he was to resign the leadership, but first he would attempt to reform the electoral system to reduce the role for the rank-and-file party membership (he failed in this).

In the subsequent leadership election, David Cameron was elected as Conservative Party leader. Although he had failed in his own campaign, commentators have since argued that Portillo's run in 2001 created the conditions under which his reformist agenda was able to succeed four years later. By this point, however, Portillo himself had retired from Parliament, frustrated with party politics.

Cameron returned the party to government at the 2010 general election as the head of a Conservative and Liberal Democrat coalition. In this government, Duncan Smith was appointed Secretary of State for Work and Pensions and Clarke was appointed Lord Chancellor and Secretary of State for Justice. Cameron subsequently won a majority five years later at the 2015 general election.
