= NRS process =

The NRS process (New Regeneration System) is a process to reduce calcium from beet-root thin-juice. It is used in beet-sugar factories to improve the capacity and operating time of evaporators and to produce soft molasses that can be further de-sugarised with chromatography.

The original technology was invented by AKZO for a different application. It was first used in French sugar factories, starting in the 1970s. Plants may have a capacity of 100-1000 m^{3}/h or greater. The system is often used in the US, France, and Britain. German sugar makers traditionally prefer to invest into bigger evaporation capacity.

The NRS-installation will consist of a number of columns filled with strong-acid-cationic resin. It is installed after carbonatation and filtration and before evaporation. The resin is loaded with sodium Na^{+} ions, that are exchanged for calcium Ca^{++}. The softened juice will then be evaporated.

For the regeneration of the resin softened juice will be mixed with caustic-soda (NaOH) and will be sent to the columns to transform the resin back into Na-form. The calcium-rich juice with high pH is sent in several fractions to the beginning of the clarification process, where alkalinisation is needed and the calcium is absorbed by the solid organic matter.

== Features of the process ==
It is effluent free and uses the product for regeneration. Chemicals are consumed in about the same amount as in traditional technology. The resin is robust, stable and not expensive. The control technology is simple.

== Effects of the process ==
- Reduces the calcium content.
- Less soda needed.
- Reduces possible turbidity.
