= 1997 Conservative Party leadership election =

- 10–19 June 1997
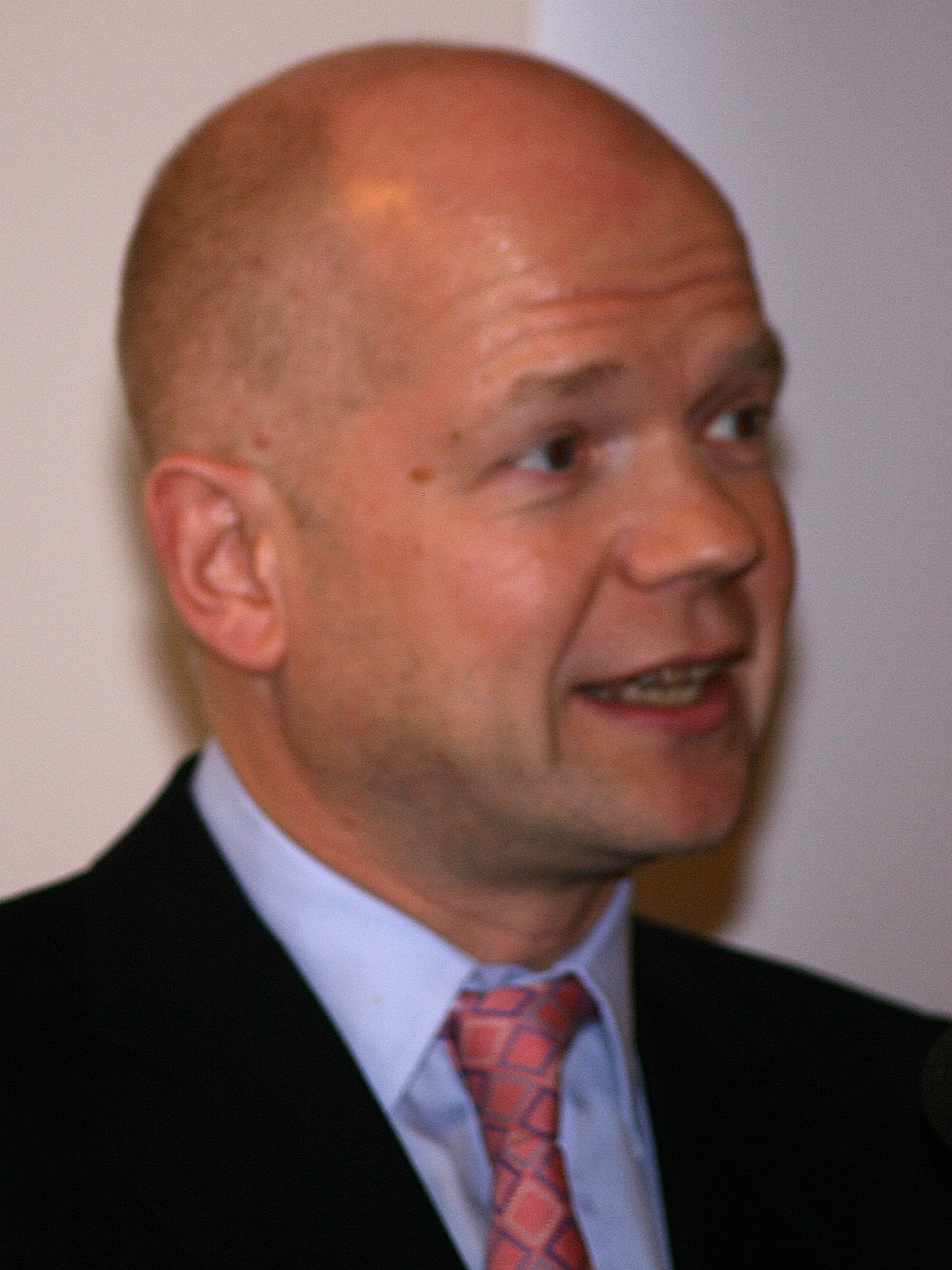

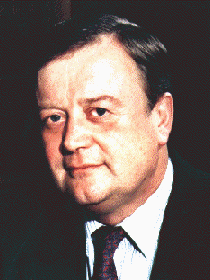

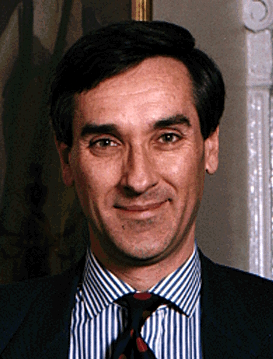

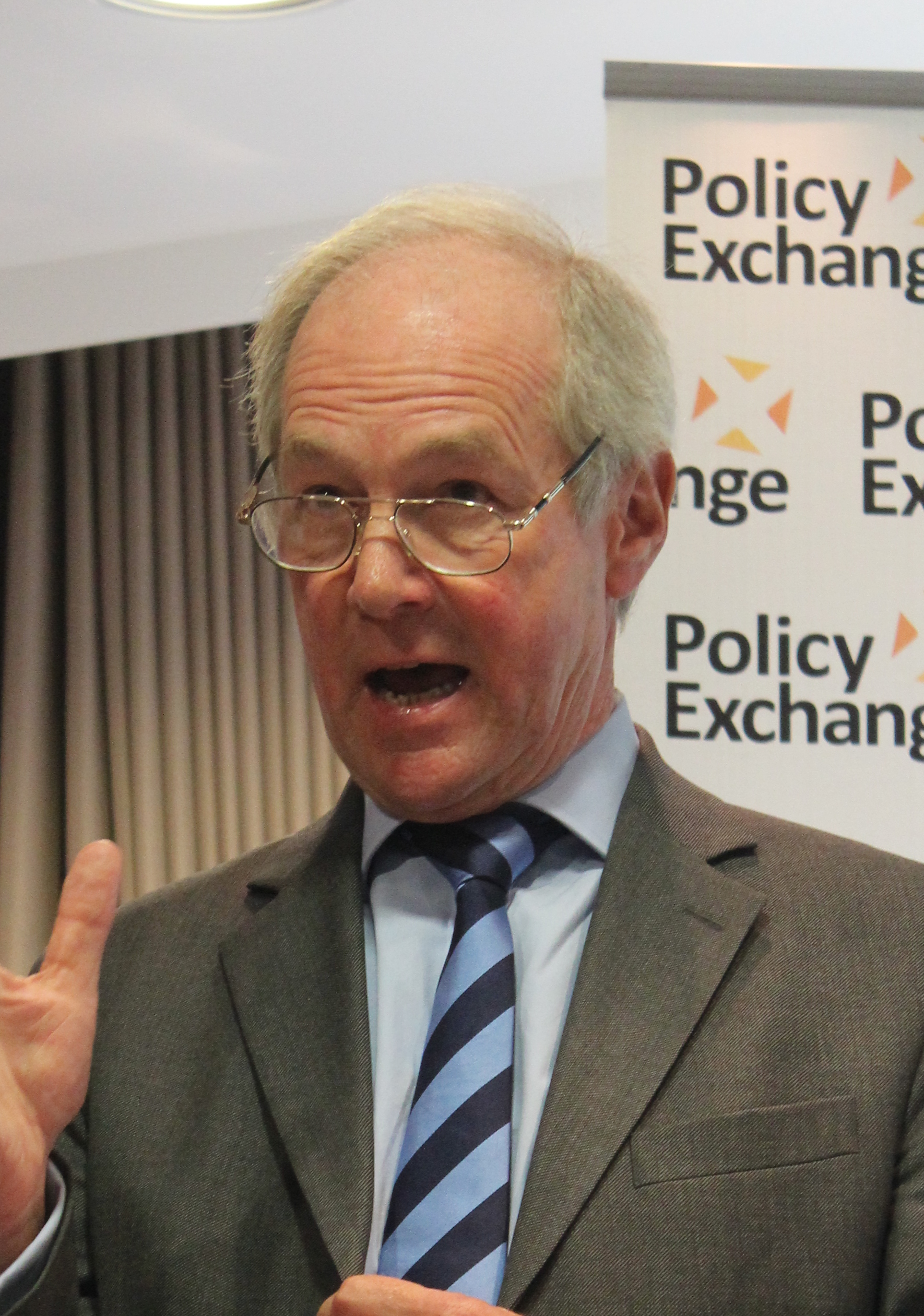

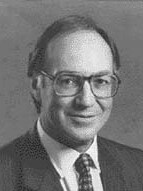
Candidate	William Hague	Kenneth Clarke	John Redwood
First ballot	41 (25.0%)	49 (29.9%)	27 (16.5%)
Second ballot	62 (38.2%)	66 (40.7%)	34 (20.9%)
Third ballot	92 (56.8%)	70 (43.2%)	Eliminated
Candidate	Peter Lilley	Michael Howard
First ballot	24 (14.6%)	23 (14.0%)
Second ballot	Withdrew	Eliminated
Third ballot	Withdrew	Eliminated
Leader before election
John Major
Elected Leader
William Hague

The 1997 Conservative Party leadership election was triggered when John Major resigned as leader on 2 May 1997, following his party's landslide defeat at the 1997 general election, which ended 18 years of Conservative Government of the United Kingdom. Major had been Conservative leader and prime minister since November 1990.

== Candidates ==
=== Announced ===
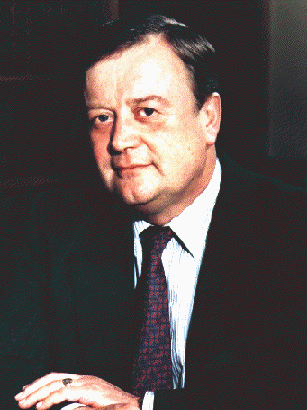
Clarke (pictured) had led the first two rounds of balloting but lost in the final run-off against Hague.

The following candidates announced their intention to stand:

- Kenneth Clarke
- William Hague
- Michael Howard
- Peter Lilley
- John Redwood

=== Announced but withdrew ===
- Stephen Dorrell – withdrew in favour of Clarke before the ballot. Dorrell had the support of 8 or 9 MPs, some of whom did not transfer their support to Clarke due to his pro-European opinions.

=== Declined candidates ===
- Michael Heseltine – had been widely expected to contest the leadership but declined to do so following health concerns. Heseltine supported Kenneth Clarke during the contest.
- Gillian Shephard

=== Not an MP at the time ===
In the months before the general election a number of other prominent Conservatives were talked about as potential leaders; however, several failed to hold their seats in the general election including the following:

- Ian Lang
- Michael Portillo
- Malcolm Rifkind

In addition, many had speculated about Chris Patten returning to Westminster (he had lost his seat in the 1992 election) and becoming leader; however, the contest took place before Patten's term of office as Governor of Hong Kong ended.

== Campaign ==
During the campaign Jeremy Paxman asked Michael Howard whether he had threatened to overrule the former Director General of HM Prison Service Derek Lewis when he was Home Secretary. The question was put 12 times with Howard failing to give a definitive answer.

== Results ==
First ballot: 10 June 1997
Candidate	Votes	%
Kenneth Clarke	49	29.9
William Hague	41	25.0
John Redwood	27	16.5
Peter Lilley	24	14.6
Michael Howard	23	14.0
Turnout	164	100
Second ballot required

Howard was eliminated. He was regarded as a serious contender but had been damaged by the criticisms of Ann Widdecombe (who had served under him at the Home Office) that he had "something of the night about him" and by the decision of William Hague, who had originally agreed to support Howard and become Deputy Leader, to stand in his own right.

Peter Lilley withdrew voluntarily. He and Howard gave their backing to Hague.

=== Second round ===
Second ballot: 17 June 1997
Candidate	Votes	%
Kenneth Clarke	64	39.0
William Hague	62	37.8
John Redwood	38	23.2
Turnout	164	100
Third ballot required

Redwood was eliminated.

=== Final round ===
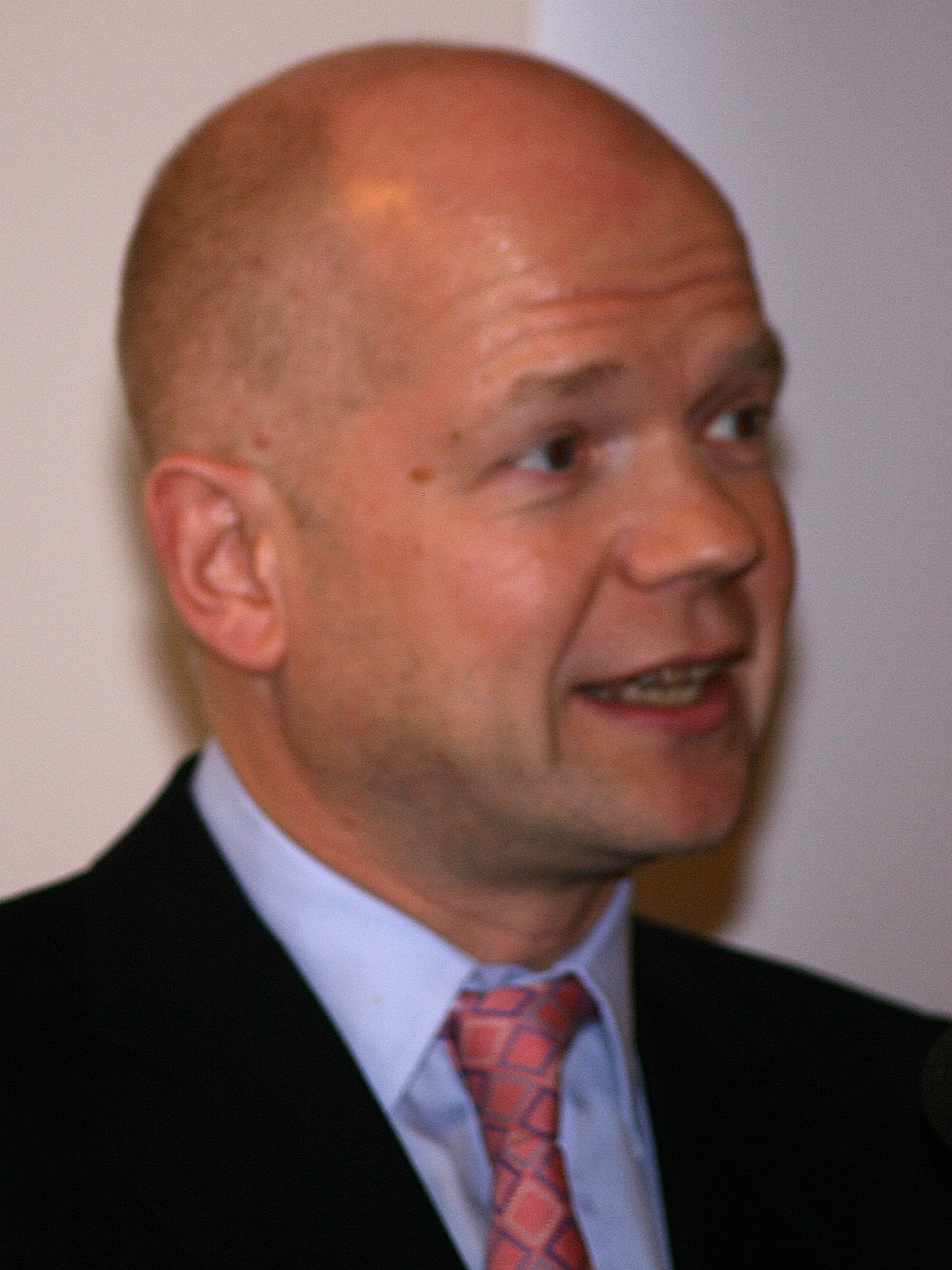
William Hague won the 1997 Conservative Party leadership election

For the final round, Clarke, facing likely defeat by Hague, offered to stand aside in Michael Heseltine's favour. Heseltine was less unpopular with eurosceptics than Clarke, who was seen as the main Conservative Party champion of potential British membership of the planned euro. Heseltine, who had had a stent fitted after an attack of angina the day after the General Election, was tempted by the offer, but declined on medical advice.

Redwood gave his backing to Clarke, an unusual development in that Redwood (eurosceptic) and Clarke (europhile) held opposite views on the main issue of dispute amongst Conservatives. In return for the endorsement, it was generally understood that Clarke would name Redwood Shadow Chancellor.

This pact backfired, however, and the agreement was seen as so cynical that it drew comparison to the Nazi–Soviet Pact of the late 1930s. It prompted former Conservative Prime Minister Margaret Thatcher to publicly endorse Hague. In the event, most of Redwood's supporters switched to Hague rather than to Clarke.

Third ballot: 19 June 1997
Candidate	Votes	%
William Hague	90	55.2
Kenneth Clarke	72	44.2
Abstentions	1	0.6
Turnout	163	99.4
William Hague elected

Julian Lewis announced that he was the only MP who did not vote and said that he was "not happy to give support to either" candidate, describing the choice in the final round as being "between a consistent strong left-winger and an inconsistent centrist".

== Aftermath ==
Under William Hague's leadership, the party would fail to make any significant advance at the 2001 general election, netting only a single seat, and he was succeeded by Iain Duncan Smith.

In 1998, the system of leadership elections was altered to one where MPs vote in rounds to select a shortlist of two candidates, who are then presented to the mass membership to choose. This system was first used in the 2001 leadership election and a modified form of these rules remains in place today.

An incumbent leader can still be ousted by a no confidence vote of Conservative MPs, as was done to Iain Duncan Smith in October 2003. A leader could therefore (in principle) be ousted by MPs despite still enjoying the support of the mass membership.

== Books used for references ==
- Kenneth Clarke, Kind of Blue, Macmillan, 2016, ISBN 1-509-83719-1
- Michael Heseltine, Life in the Jungle, Hodder & Stoughton, 2000, ISBN 0-340-73915-0
