= Derek Lewis (administrator) =

Former director of UK prison service, possibly threatened with being overruled

Derek Lewis (born 9 July 1946) is a former Director General of HM Prison Service, who was sacked in controversial circumstances by then Home Secretary Michael Howard in 1995.

== Early career ==
Lewis was educated at Wrekin College in Telford, before studying at Queens' College, Cambridge, between 1964 and 1967 where he was a member of the Silver Boars dining society. After graduating he worked for Ford Europe for fourteen years before assuming directorships at Imperial Group, Granada plc and Courtaulds. In 1993 he became Chief Executive and Director General of HM Prison Service.

== Sacking ==
In 1995, Lewis was sacked from HM Prison Service by Michael Howard following two high-profile escapes by IRA prisoners. He had declined to suspend the governor of Parkhurst Prison following a high-profile escape, and alleged that Howard had threatened to overrule him to force the suspension. Howard denied that he had done so. During the 1997 Conservative Leadership contest, Jeremy Paxman asked Howard whether he had threatened to overrule Lewis. The question was put 12 times with Howard failing to give a definitive answer. Although Howard did make it clear that he did not overrule Derek Lewis, he did not make it clear whether he had threatened to overrule Lewis.

== Later career ==
Lewis subsequently became director of numerous organisations, and was latterly Pro-Chancellor of the University of Essex, Chairman of Trustees of the Royal Mencap Society. and Chair of UHI North, West and Hebrides.
