= National Retail Systems =

National Retail Systems, Inc.
- Type: Privately Held
- Industry: Logistics, Transportation
- Founded: 1952, Jersey City, NJ
- Founder: Francis J. Walsh, Sr.
- Headquarters: Lyndhurst, New Jersey, United States
- Area served: North America
- Number of employees: 5,500(2018)
- Subsidiaries: Keystone Freight Corp., National Retail Transportation, Inc.
- Website: www.nrs3pl.com

National Retail Systems, Inc. (NRS) includes Keystone Freight Corp. & National Retail Transportation, Inc. (NRT). NRS is an asset based 3PL founded in 1952. It is headquartered in Lyndhurst, New Jersey, United States.

NRS' hub locations include: New York & New Jersey; Los Angeles, CA; Inland Empire, CA; Savannah, GA; Columbus, OH; Greensboro, NC; and Baltimore, MD.

== Equipment ==
National Retail Systems, Inc. has a fleet of 1,100 power units consisting of conventional over the road line haul tractors, single and double axle local tractors, straight trucks, and yard switchers. The 4300 trailers include 28', 45', 48', and 53' dry vans both swing and roll up doors.

== Incidents ==
On April 20, 2016, an overloaded National Retail Systems vehicle being operated illegally on a non-truck route by Tavaris Owens struck and killed a cyclist in Brooklyn, New York.
