= NRS social grade =

UK demographic classification

The NRS social grades are a system of demographic classification used in the United Kingdom. They were originally developed by the National Readership Survey (NRS) to classify readers, but have since been used by many other organisations for wider applications and have become a standard for market research. They were developed in the late 1950s and refined in following years and achieved widespread usage in 20th century Britain. Their definition is maintained by the Market Research Society.

According to Ipsos, NRS social grade is not the same as social class. The distinguishing feature of the NRS social grade is that it is based on occupation, rather than income, wealth or property ownership.

== Grades ==
The classifications are based on the occupation of the head of the household. The grades are often grouped into ABC1 and C2DE, representing 55% and 45% of the population in 2016 respectively.

Grade	Chief income earner's occupation	Frequency in 1968 – Ipsos	Frequency in 2008 – Ipsos	Frequency in 2016 – NRS
A	Higher managerial roles, administrative or professional	12%	4%	4%
B	Intermediate managerial roles, administrative or professional	12%	23%	23%
C1	Supervisory or clerical and junior managerial roles, administrative or professional	22%	29%	28%
C2	Skilled manual workers	65%	21%	20%
D	Semi-skilled and unskilled manual workers	65%	15%	15%
E	State pensioners, casual and lowest grade workers, unemployed with state benefits only.	65%	8%	10%

Retired people are placed in grade E if they only have a state pension and benefits. If they have an occupational or private pension, they are graded according to the highest graded job they did before retiring.

Only around 2% of the UK population identifies as upper class, and this group is not separated by the classification scheme.

The grading system is also sometimes used in the Republic of Ireland with the addition of a Class F signifying Farmers and Agricultural Workers.

=== Examples ===
The BBC's Man Alive in 1966 interviewed examples from various grades:

- E – Widow; retired nanny
- C2 – Machinist; butcher shop manager; tea lady; navvy on the Victoria Line
- C1 – Public school schoolmaster; Army lieutenant, Royal Horse Artillery (will be class B as captain, A as lieutenant colonel)
- AB – Church of England vicar (all clergy are class AB, regardless of income)
- A – Film director

== History ==
Since the creation of the system, the size of the white-collar groupings (ABC1) grew from 34% in 1968, to 55% of the population in 2016. Within this section, the professional and managerial groupings (A and B) doubled, from only 12% in 1968 to 27% in 2016. C2DE has shrunk over this period from 65% to 45% of the population. With pensioners and unemployed people included in C2DE, this means that ABC1 represents a majority of the working population.

A 2019 YouGov poll found that 41% of ABC1 identified themselves as working class (and 51% as middle class), while 66% of C2DEs identified themselves as working class (and 25% as middle class). Matthew Smith, Head of Data Journalism at YouGov, said that while NRS groupings "are often used as shorthand to refer to the middle class and working class", "the problem is that the NRS social grade was never designed to describe class".

== See also ==
- Acorn (demographics)
- National Statistics Socio-economic Classification
- Social class
- Socioeconomic status
