= National Readership Survey =

- Industry: Media
- Founded: 1956
- Defunct: April 2018
- Successor: PAMCo
- Headquarters: United Kingdom
- Area served: United Kingdom
- Parent: Institute of Practitioners in Advertising (IPA), Newspaper Publishers Association (NPA); Periodical Publishers Association (PPA)
- Website: www.nrs.co.uk

The National Readership Survey was a joint venture company in the United Kingdom (UK) between the Institute of Practitioners in Advertising (IPA), the Newspaper Publishers Association (NPA) and the Periodical Publishers Association (PPA). It provided audience research for print advertising trading in the UK. The survey covered over 250 of Britain's major newspapers and magazines, showing the size and nature of the audiences, they reached. It classified audiences in a number of ways; one such classification was the NRS social grade.

== History ==
The National Readership Survey was founded in 1956 by the Institute of Practitioners in Advertising. It became a joint industry survey body shortly after, with stakeholders from throughout the publishing industry having representation within the entity. Originally, just 62 titles had a sufficiently large readership to be covered, but by 2015 there were 124, though the average readership of these titles was considerably lower.

In April 2018, the NRS was dissolved to be replaced by PAMCo. NRS Ltd handed responsibility for governance to PAMCo Ltd, from January 2016.
