= Cambridge University Conservative Association =

University political society

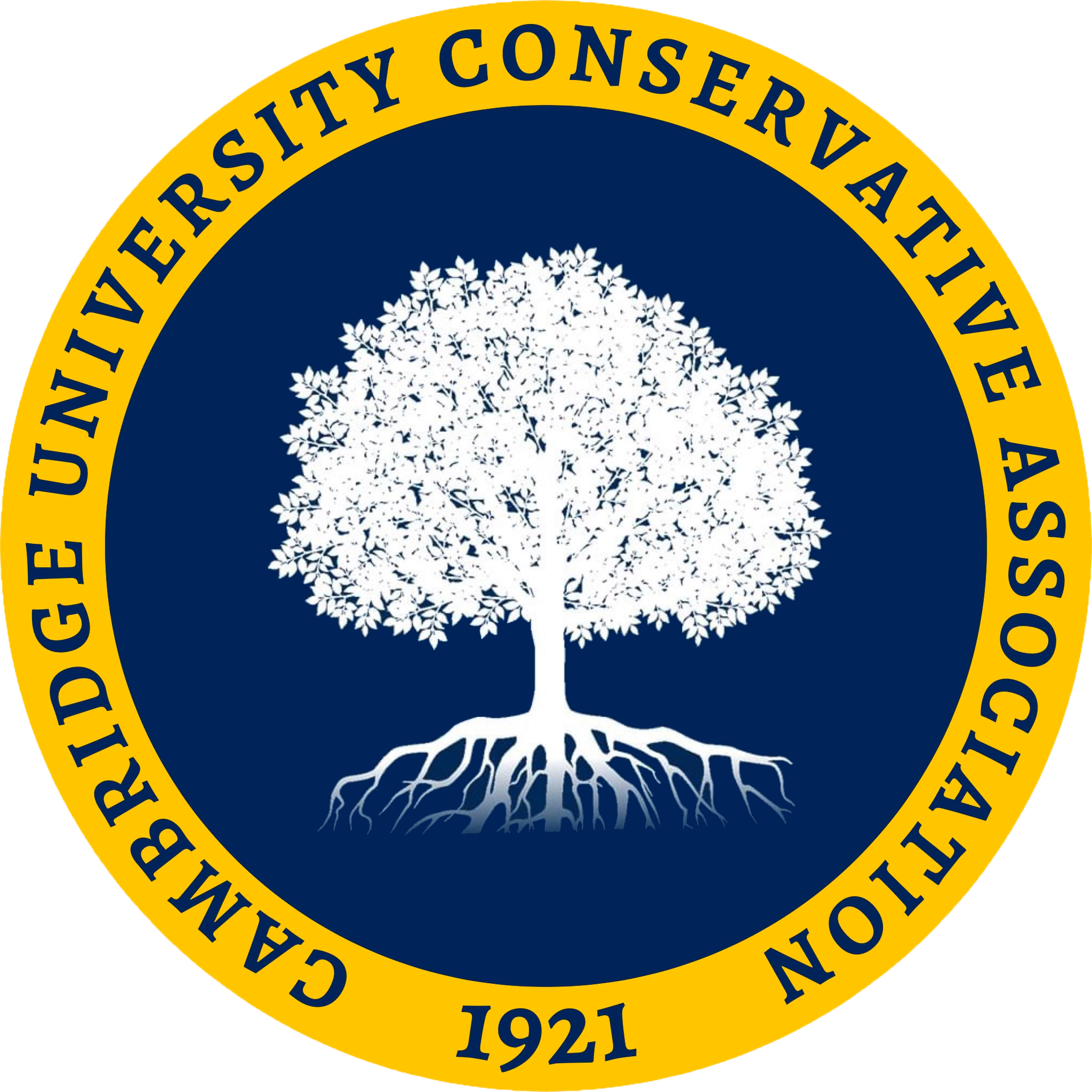
- Abbreviation: CUCA
- Formation: 1921
- Type: Political society
- Location: University of Cambridge
- Chairman: Arlo Alexander, Peterhouse
- Vice-Chairman: Alexander Corbould, Peterhouse
- Senior Treasurer: John Casey, Gonville and Caius
- President: Lord Roberts, Gonvillle and Caius
- Website: cuca.org.uk

The Cambridge University Conservative Association (CUCA) is a student political society founded in 1921 as a Conservative Association for students at the University of Cambridge. However, it has earlier roots dating back to the late nineteenth century. CUCA is not affiliated with the nationwide youth branch of the Conservative Party, the Young Conservatives, but is a fully independent Association distinct from other Conservative youth organisations. The association puts on a range of events for its members each term, notably its ‘Port & Policy’ debates, as well as addresses from several high-profile speakers.

== History ==
The earliest incarnation of the Cambridge University Conservative Association was established in 1882, but lasted only a few months before dissolving. By 1884, Cambridge Conservatives launched a new group – the Cambridge University Carlton Club. This served primarily as a dining society, and existed for the next twenty years. However, shortly after the Conservative government's landslide defeat in the 1906 general election, the Cambridge University Carlton Club dissolved, just as its predecessor had. There was no Conservative student organisation in Cambridge for the remainder of the Edwardian period, and the First World War saw party political activity suspended.

The present-day Cambridge University Conservative Association was founded in 1921, with its inaugural annual dinner held on 24 January of that year. In 1928, the annual St. John's College magazine The Eagle defined "a Cambridge Conservative [association member as] the proud possessor of a certain tie, obtained by signifying with a subscription his refusal or his inability to think out any social question."

CUCA alumni had considerable influence on British politics in the 1980s and 1990s, with the rise to prominence of the 'Cambridge Mafia' including cabinet ministers Leon Brittan, Kenneth Clarke, Norman Fowler, John Gummer, Michael Howard, and Norman Lamont, who had dominated CUCA and the Cambridge Union in the early 1960s. Considerable overlap between the officeholders of the two societies continues to the present day, while various present-day Cabinet officials and Members of Parliament are CUCA alumni.

== Activities ==
CUCA is principally a political events association, holding regular speaker meetings, social events and debates.

In recent years, CUCA has attempted to play a larger part in Cambridge University-wide politics. Members of CUCA have stood for election as Presidents of the Cambridge University Students' Union (CUSU) in recent years, whilst CUCA itself has lobbied CUSU Council directly. The association remains disaffiliated from the national Conservative Party, and has instead pitched itself as a bastion of philosophical conservatism for members of Cambridge University.

CUCA's current cost of membership is £25 for life membership. Annual memberships were previously sold for £20 but their sale was ended by constitutional amendment in Easter 2023.

=== Debates ===
The association's premier debating event is 'Port and Policy', which is held around four times a term. In its current format, three motions are presented. Typically the final motion is tongue-in-cheek or less serious: the divine right of kings is a recurring topic, as is the health of Western Civilisation. After speeches for and against the motion, the floor is invited to participate via floor speeches. Once the debate has concluded, voting occurs by acclamation in proposition and opposition. For many years Port and Policy had been a roundtable discussion, with the adversarial format only introduced in 2016, but this change has already driven attendance to, on occasion, over 100.

=== Speaker events ===
CUCA holds regular speaker events with both Conservative politicians and right-wing thinkers. Speakers that have addressed the association in recent terms have included Jacob Rees-Mogg, John Major, Norman Tebbit and Dominic Grieve. CUCA has a well-established history of attracting a high calibre of speakers, often including Cabinet ministers, think-tank experts and former Prime Ministers.

=== Social events ===
Much of CUCA's calendar is focused on social events, which have included Cava & Chocolate, Port & Cheese and Garden Parties amongst many others. A termly highlight is the Chairman's Dinner, which marks the handing over of the leadership of the association from one chairman to another.

=== Publication of 'Freshers' Guides' ===
CUCA has thrice published a 'Freshers' Guide', an introductory magazine distributed to first-years designed to give instruction and advice on Cambridge student life.

The association has argued that many unavoidable aspects of student life at Cambridge (formal dinners, navigating a multitude of student societies, language) are ignored by bodies such as CUSU and College JCRs for fear of being seen to perpetuate elitism. CUCA has argued that this approach itself perpetuates elitism, and instead aims to celebrate the 'quirks and curiosities' of Cambridge by the production and dissemination of accessible advice.

The Guide returned in 2016, published as 'The Cambridge Directory'. Edited by Nicholas Taylor and Jack Drury, it offered advice on shopping, formalwear, restaurants, culture and etiquette. Within a week of publication, the 'Directory' had not only picked up press attention, but had been downloaded over 6000 times. The editors observed that Freshers had approached them praising the content of the Directory for "providing answers to questions they'd have felt awkward asking." A new version of the Guide was published in 2023.

=== Lobbying CUSU and remembrance ===
In 2017, a member of CUCA stood for election to the presidency of CUSU: his membership of CUCA featured heavily in the election reporting. In 2018, another member of CUCA stood for election to the same post. His membership of CUCA also featured heavily in the election reporting. Both individuals insisted throughout their campaigns that membership of CUCA was incidental to the post for which they stood.

In October 2018, members of CUCA took a motion to CUSU Council proposing that CUSU do more to recognise the war dead. The motion was rejected. This decision by CUSU Council resulted in a significant press fallout. The then chairman of CUCA, Timur Coskun, appeared on several national news outlets to discuss the issue of remembrance.

=== Committee make-up ===
Following recent reforms, CUCA is run by an executive of nine members: the Chairman, Vice-Chairman, Junior Treasurer, Campaigns Officer, Communications and Publicity Officer, Speakers Officer, Speakers Officer-Elect, Secretary, and Social Events Officer. Following constitutional changes passed in Lent 2009, the Vice-Chairman automatically becomes Chairman in the term following their Vice-Chairmanship.

CUCA members may also join the committee by applying to become appointed members, whereby they sit on the committee with a non-executive remit. Constitutional reforms passed in the Easter 2023 Termly General Meeting introduced an additional two appointed posts, Alumni Officers, which are also non-executive.

== Notable events ==
=== 1938: Pro-appeasement ===
In 1938, CUCA hosted Sir Samuel Hoare as he gave a vigorous defence of Neville Chamberlain's policy of appeasement towards Hitler at Munich, calling it "a great achievement" and "the height of exaltation".

=== 1939: Pro-freedom ===
On the 26th of May 1939, CUCA hosted Sir Winston Churchill in Cambridge's Corn Exchange, where he argued vociferously for conscription in the face of the Nazi threat. At least 2,500 undergraduates and others attended, with further crowds listening over loudspeakers in a nearby hotel. Churchill called for Britain to lead a worldwide "League of Freedom" and received rapturous support. He gave one of his most eloquent speeches of the entire pre-war period about "the habit of despotism and the lust of conquest". The pro-conscription, anti-Hitler motion won "ten-to-one" according to a newspaper report of the event.

=== 1956: Support for the Suez Invasion ===
In reporting and listing widespread student protests across Britain against the invasion of Suez in 1956, The Times noted that, instead, the "Cambridge University Conservative Association sent telegrams of support to the Prime Minister (Sir Anthony Eden) and Foreign Secretary (Selwyn Lloyd)."

=== 1960-1: Visits by Sir Oswald Mosley ===
In 1961, the future Conservative leader Michael Howard resigned from the committee in protest at the decision of Kenneth Clarke, the then chairman, to invite Sir Oswald Mosley to address the association for the second year running. (The previous year's speech by Mosley had been marred by a heckler throwing jelly at him.)

=== 1965–1998: Allegations of electoral malpractice ===
The society has, in the past, occasionally hit the headlines of both national and local papers over electoral disputes:

In 1965,The Times reported that CUCA's Secretary was forced to resign after a four and a half-hour meeting deemed some of his election methods to have been forbidden.

In 1985, The Times again reported that eight committee members of CUCA had "resigned after allegations of electoral irregularities", with one committee member having a tape recording which he claimed proved the allegations.

In early 1998, Varsity published a story alleging that "weeks of bitter in-fighting culminated in allegations of election-rigging and a move to censure the society's most senior members". However, Varsity conceded that the subsequent motions of censure themselves had no reasons formally attached to them by their proposers and that some signatories were unaware of why they were supporting them.

However, Varsity articles on CUCA elections have themselves come under fire in the past: following an Easter 2000 article, "Conservatives in Corruption Crisis", which accused the then-chairman of 'vote-buying', the paper was forced to print a front-page "Rectification" and apology, after threats of legal action.

=== 1969: Alleged elitism ===
In January 2010, former Conservative MP and gay rights campaigner Matthew Parris admitted that on arriving at Cambridge in 1969 he had joined the Liberals, remarking that "I couldn't bring myself to join the CU Conservative Association because they were such braying, cravat-wearing, port-gargling, social-networking prats." This prompted a letter to The Times signed by CUCA's Registrar who quipped that "at any one meeting of CU Conservative Association, only one person should ever wear a cravat to avoid ostentation." Parris had previously described CUCA in his 2002 autobiography as "a dreadful shower, strutting careerists of distinctly mixed calibre, forever infighting, networking and elbowing their way through a scene which appeared more social than political."

=== 1985-6: Visits by Enoch Powell ===
A visit by Enoch Powell in March 1985 provoked resignations on CUCA's committee, and when Powell returned in December 1986, he was heckled by non-Conservative students. CUCA had also come under criticism for Powell's 1985 appearance in the New Statesman, which argued that Powell's extreme views were indicative of CUCA's alleged authoritarianism, and the paper asserting the (short-lived) "Cambridge University Monday Club form part of an unholy alliance with elements of the Left and the now-discredited Cambridge University Conservative Association, who are united in their fervent, even violent opposition to libertarians. Perhaps it is this bizarre grouping which deserves investigation."

=== 2012: BBC 'Wonderland' documentary ===
On 9 August 2012, the BBC broadcast the documentary Young, Bright and on the Right as part of its Wonderland series. The episode followed two student political activists from deprived backgrounds, one of whom was former CUCA Committee member Chris Monk. The documentary attracted much press attention in the days following the broadcast, particularly at Monk's remark "The whole point of the [Cambridge University] Conservative Association is it gives you a chance to pretend to be a member of the upper classes for an afternoon".

CUCA responded with a statement on its website, stressing its "disappointment that a documentary has aired which misrepresents Cambridge University Conservative Association...Contrary to the suggestions of the programme, CUCA is unfalteringly open to all.".

=== 2018: James Delingpole at a Chairman's Dinner ===
In June 2018, it was reported that attendees at chairman's Dinner had walked out during the address from James Delingpole after he made a number of unpalatable jokes. Delingpole is reported to have advised attendees to raise enough money to pay for their children's private education, and joked about the sex abuse perpetuated by Jimmy Savile. Delingpole subsequently defended himself in The Spectator, while CUCA released a statement stating that they did not support the viewpoints that Delingpole stated.

=== 2026: Far Right Speaker Invitation and Cancellation ===
In 2026, the society came under criticism after it was revealed that it had invited the YouTuber Tom Rowsell to the society for his views on "pagan heritage of Europe and English genealogy" and "genetics". The Labour Association accused CUCA of knowingly platforming a person who "has documented links to eugenicists", including accusing France of "negrophilia". CULC accused Mr Rowsell having "links to neo-Nazis and the far right", and the society were aware of this when the made the invite. The chairman retracted the invite and apologised, cancelling the invite because "he [Rowsell] has nothing in common with my values or our values as a society". However, an event with another speaker, Jack Anderton, who had previously questioned Britain's involvement in the Second World War, went ahead amid student protest.

=== General press comments on CUCA ===
In 1980, Private Eye condemned Timothy Eggar, a Conservative MP and former CUCA chairman, as "one of those unpleasant political operators that Cambridge University Conservative Association alone knows how to breed."

In November 1998, it was claimed in Varsity that outgoing chairmen of CUCA were awarded a pair of silver cufflinks, with one CUCA committee member quipping that "several of the last Chairmen only served their terms of office so that they could get the cufflinks."

== List of CUCA Chairmen ==
Academic year	Michaelmas	Lent	Easter
Lent 1921-1929	Geoffrey G. Butler		
1929-1930	Hon. Jocelyn Arthur Pike Pease		
	Break in records	-	-
1949-1950		Peter Jenkin-Jones (Trinity Hall)	Arthur Rogers (Trinity)
1950-1951	Francis Julian Williams (Trinity)	Geoffrey Howe (Trinity Hall)	Denzil Freeth (Trinity)
1951-1952	Douglas Hurd (Trinity)	Antony Buck (Trinity Hall)	John Burnell (Jesus)
1952-1953	Geoffrey Field (Trinity Hall)	John Biffen (Jesus)	Gordon Pears (Christ's)
1953-1954	Allen Molesworth (Trinity)	Rafton Pounder (Christ's)	John Chown (Selwyn)
1954-1955	Tam Dalyell (King's)	Robin O'Neill (Trinity)	Ian Deane (Peterhouse)
1955-1956	Ian Hartland (Downing)	Robert Parsons (Downing)	Peter Taylor (Sidney Sussex)
1956-1957	David Fairbairn (Gonville and Caius)	Keith Wilson (King's)	Michael Farrow (Trinity)
1957-1958	Charles Hampden-Turner (Trinity)	David Davies (Pembroke)	Ian Orr-Ewing (Pembroke)
1958-1959	Michael Norsworthy (Clare)	John Cunningham (Peterhouse)	Colin Emmins (Selwyn)
1959-1960	Peter Lloyd (Pembroke)	Leon Brittan (Trinity)	Peter Viggers (Trinity Hall)
1960-1961	Norman Fowler (Trinity Hall)	Peter Temple-Morris (St Catharine's)	John Selwyn Gummer (Selwyn)
1961-1962	Kenneth Clarke (Gonville and Caius)	Hugh Dykes (Pembroke)	David Glass (St John's)
1962-1963	John Toulmin (Trinity Hall)	John Maskell (Peterhouse)	Norman Lamont (Fitzwilliam)
1963-1964	Peter Fullerton (Gonville and Caius)	David Eady (Trinity)	Alan Bradley (Trinity)
1964-1965	Howell Hughes (Queens')	Adrian Vinson (Gonville and Caius)	John Ryan (Queens')
1965-1966	Andrew Rose (Trinity)	John Davies (Selwyn)	Godfrey Barker (Gonville and Caius)
1966-1967	Andrew Millington (Trinity)	Susan Rudd (Newnham)	Spencer Batiste (Queens')
1967-1968	Edward Davies (Trinity)	Christopher Clarke (Gonville and Caius)	Julian Gibson Watt (Trinity)
1968-1969	Howard Flight (Magdalene)	Roger Evans (Trinity Hall)	John Watts (Gonville and Caius)
1969-1970	Philip Heslop (Christ's)	William Powell (Emmanuel)	David Mellor (Christ's)
1970-1971	James Powell (Emmanuel)	Richard Ryder (Magdalene)	Nicholas Webb (Downing)
1971-1972	Hugh Parker (St John's)	John Rushton (Sidney Sussex)	Ian Gaunt (Selwyn)
1972-1973	Timothy Eggar (Magdalene)	Paul Serfaty (Trinity)	Norman Blackwell (Trinity)
1973-1974	Stephen Allcock (Jesus)	Robert Green (Sidney Sussex)	Jonathan Hirst (Trinity)
1974-1975	Archie Norman (Emmanuel)	John Griffith-Jones (Trinity Hall)	Christopher Causer (Trinity Hall)
1975-1976	John Hastings Bass (Trinity)	David Prior (Pembroke)	Alexander Hill Smith (Pembroke)
1976-1977	Adair Turner (Gonville and Caius)	David Grayson (Downing)	Christopher Whalley (Selwyn)
1977-1978	Andrew Mitchell (Jesus)	Rosemary Chubb (Homerton)	Charles Pender (Magdalene)
1978-1979	David Lidington (Sidney Sussex)	Andrew McHallam (Queens')	Simon Morris (Gonville and Caius)
1979-1980	Mark Bishop (Downing)	Simon Goodfellow (Jesus)	Kathryn Shaw (Girton)
1980-1981	Christopher Frazer (St. John's)	Gillian Herrod (Trinity Hall)	John Antcliffe (Corpus Christi)
1981-1982	Julia Ablethorpe (King's)	Simon Baynes (Magdalene)	Gilbert Dunlop (St John's)
1982-1983	Simon Milton (Gonville and Caius)	Andrew Marshall (Robinson)	Oliver Brind (St John's)
1983-1984	Adrian Burford (Gonville and Caius)	Edward Hess (Peterhouse)	Lawrence Guthrie (St John's)
1984-1985	Andrew Roberts (Gonville and Caius)	Clive Blackwood (resigned) (Gonville and Caius) Peter Hopkins (Emmanuel)	Graham Stuart (Selwyn)
1985-1986	Mark Foster-Brown (Robinson)	David Platt (Trinity Hall)	Robert Hardman (Pembroke)
1986-1987	John Hyman (Christ's)	Bryony Griffiths (St John's)	Damian Riley Smith (Downing)
1987-1988	Jonathan Rich (Magdalene)	Greg Hands (Robinson)	Martin Calderbank (Magdalene)
1988-1989	Patrick Paines (Peterhouse)	James Bullock (Sidney Sussex)	Miles Millar (Christ's)
1989-1990	Roseanne Serrelli (New Hall)	Jonathan Bailey (Gonville and Caius)	Mark Waldron (Sidney Sussex)
1990-1991	Nick Maddock (Trinity)	Paul Barton (Trinity)	Justin Davies (Pembroke)
1991-1992	Ryan Robson (Peterhouse)	Lizzie Pryor (Emmanuel)	Ed Baker
1992-1993	Tim Kevan (Magdalene)	Catherine Ewins (King's)	Victoria Harper (Trinity ?)
1993-1994	Nick Green (St John's)	Julian Bailey (Clare)	Victoria Boswell (Downing)
1994-1995	Duncan Reed (Jesus)	Lorraine Fahey (New Hall)	Colin Farmer BA (Magdalene)
1995-1996	Will Bracken (Downing)	Chris Daniels (Trinity Hall)	Melanie Robinson (Trinity)
1996-1997	Attila Malta (Sidney Sussex)	Richard Williams (Gonville and Caius)	Oliver Kerridge (Christ's)
1997-1998	James Hellyer (Christ's)	David Mitchinson (St Catharine's)	Mark Nicholson (Peterhouse)
1998-1999	Paul Mawdsley (Peterhouse)	Alan Mendoza (Gonville and Caius)	Duncan Crossey (Downing)
1999-2000	Tim Hamer (Trinity Hall)	Martin Williams (Magdalene)	Suella Fernandes (Queens')
2000-2001	Tim Haire (Girton)	Alison Newton (Newnham)	James Davies (Christ's)
2001-2002	David Snowdon (Peterhouse)	Will Gallagher (Trinity Hall)	Sam Chamberlain (Christ's)
2002-2003	Laurence Tailby (Robinson)	Stephen Parkinson (Emmanuel)	George Murphy (Gonville and Caius)
2003-2004	Edward Cumming (Downing)	Matthew Jamison (Peterhouse)	Alex Wright (Peterhouse)
2004-2005	Magnus Gittins (Trinity Hall)	Richard Sidey (Selwyn)	Tom Goodhead (Clare)
2005-2006	Laurie Fitzjohn-Sykes (Selwyn)	Alexander Langley (Gonville and Caius)	E. Hughes (Gonville and Caius)
2006-2007	Julia Beck (Gonville and Caius)	Timothy Gardiner (Gonville and Caius)	Bezhan Salehy (Selwyn)
2007-2008	James Wallis (Gonville and Caius)	Roland Valentine Stewart (Gonville and Caius)	Mike Morley BA MSci (Trinity)
2008-2009	Hugo Hadlow (St John's)	James Sharpe (Fitzwilliam)	Hugh Burling (St John's)
2009-2010	Caroline Cummins (Newnham)	Gavin Rice (Queens')	John Oxley (Gonville and Caius)
2010-2011	Fergus McGhee (Trinity)	Callum Wood (Queens')	Christopher Poel (Queens')
2011-2012	Matthew Johnstone (Queens')	Edward Turnham, MA (Christ's)	Michael Goode (Gonville and Caius)
2012-2013	Nick Crawford (Gonville and Caius)	Ingram Davidson (Trinity)	Katie Lam (Trinity)
2013-2014	David Cowan (Christ's)	T James Mottram (Selwyn)	Radley Cunliffe (Homerton)
2014-2015	Daniel Jennings (Corpus Christi)	Callum Campbell (Fitzwilliam)	Melissa Macdonald (Homerton)
2015-2016	Victoria Brown (St. John's)	Samuel Carr (Robinson)	Nakul Khanna (Gonville and Caius)
2016-2017	Conor Monighan (Fitzwilliam)	James Mathieson (Churchill)	Alistair Booth (Gonville and Caius)
2017-2018	Henry Mitson (Gonville and Caius)	Connor MacDonald (Emmanuel)	Dylan Coll-Reed (Trinity)
2018-2019	Timur Coskun (Trinity)	William Phelps (Corpus Christi)	Oliver Riley (Robinson)
2019-2020	Harry Clynch (Churchill)	Benedict Smith (Selwyn)	Curran Snell (Downing)
2020-2021	Phoebe Pickering (Corpus Christi)	William Rowland (Gonville and Caius)	Zachary Marsh (Robinson)
2021-2022	Hugo Williams (Peterhouse)	Sam William Hunt (Pembroke)	Roberto Salvia (Robinson)
2022-2023	James Appiah III (Pembroke)	John Lush (Girton) resigned, Oliver Howes (Trinity)	Isaac Figliuoli (Trinity)
2023-2024	Sam Spiri (Clare)	Tom Pate (Kings)	Toby Noskwith (Hughes Hall)
2024-2025	Szymon Sawicki (Christ's)	Alexander M. K. Marshall (Peterhouse)	Zoe Zhang (Gonville and Caius)
2025-2026	Daniel Vollborth (Churchill)	Oscar Lingwood (Lucy Cavendish)	Arlo Alexander (Peterhouse)

== Notable alumni ==
=== Members of Parliament ===
==== UK Parliament ====
- Spencer Batiste, MP, CUCA chairman (Easter 1967)
- Humphrey Berkeley, MP, CUCA chairman (1948)
- Victoria Boswell, MP, CUCA chairman (Easter 1994)
- Sir Antony Buck, QC, MP, CUCA chairman (Lent 1952)
- Sir Geoffrey G. Butler, MP, CUCA chairman (Lent 192?)
- Sir Nick Clegg, MP, CUCA Member
- Sir Stafford Cripps, CH, QC, FRS, MP, CUCA Member
- Sir Tam Dalyell, Baronet, MP, CUCA chairman (Michaelmas 1954)
- James Davies, MP, CUCA chairman (Easter 2001)
- Timothy Eggar, MP, CUCA chairman (Michaelmas 1972)
- Roger Evans, MP, CUCA chairman (Lent 1969)
- Suella Fernandes, MP, CUCA chairman (Easter 2000)
- Denzil Freeth, MBE, MP, CUCA chairman (Easter 1951)
- Greg Hands, MP, CUCA chairman (Lent 1988)
- David Lidington CBE, MP, CUCA chairman (Michaelmas 1978)
- Sir Peter Lloyd, MP, CUCA chairman (Michaelmas 1959)
- David Mellor, QC, MP, CUCA chairman (Easter 1970)
- Andrew Mitchell, MP, CUCA chairman (Michaelmas 1977)
- Archie Norman, MP, CUCA chairman (Michaelmas 1974)
- Sir John Nott, KCB, MP, CUCA Member
- Michael Portillo, MP, CUCA Member
- Rafton Pounder, MP, CUCA chairman (Lent 1954)
- William Powell, MP, CUCA chairman (Lent 1970)
- Graham Stuart, MP, CUCA chairman (Easter 1985)
- John Watts, MP, CUCA chairman (Easter 1969)
- Sir Peter Viggers, CUCA chairman (Easter 1960)

==== Other legislatures ====
- Mark Speakman, MP, CUCA member (elected to the New South Wales Legislative Assembly in Australia as a member of the Liberal Party)

=== Peers ===
- John Biffen, PC, DL, MP, CUCA chairman (Lent 1953)
- Norman Blackwell, CUCA chairman (Easter 1973)
- Nick Bourne, AM, CUCA Treasurer
- Leon Brittan, PC, QC, DL, MP, CUCA chairman (Lent 1960)
- Rab Butler, MP, CUCA Member
- Kenneth Clarke, CH, QC, MP, CUCA chairman (Michaelmas 1961)
- Hon. Jocelyn Arthur Pike Pease, 2nd Baron Daryngton, Hereditary Peer, CUCA chairman (1929–1930)
- Hugh Dykes, MP, CUCA chairman (Lent 1962)
- Howard Flight, MP, CUCA chairman (Michaelmas 1968)
- Norman Fowler, Kt., PC, MP, CUCA chairman (Michaelmas 1960)
- John Selwyn Gummer, PC, MP, CUCA chairman (Easter 1961)
- David Hacking, 3rd Baron Hacking, CUCA Member
- Geoffrey Howe, MP, CUCA chairman (Lent 1951)
- Michael Howard, MP, CUCA Committee Member
- Douglas Hurd, CH, CBE, PC, MP, CUCA chairman (Michaelmas 1951)
- Norman Lamont, PC, MP, CUCA chairman (Easter 1963)
- Ian Lang, PC, MP, CUCA Member
- Selwyn Lloyd, CH, CBE, TD, PC, QC, DL, CUCA Member
- Viscount Monckton, Hereditary Peer, CUCA Treasurer (1973)
- Stephen Parkinson, Baron Parkinson of Whitley Bay, CUCA chairman (Lent 2003)
- David Prior, MP, CUCA chairman (Lent 1976)
- Richard Ryder, OBE, PC, MP, CUCA chairman (Lent 1971)
- Norman St.John-Stevas, PC, FRSL, MP, CUCA Member
- Peter Temple-Morris, CUCA chairman (Lent 1961)
- Christopher Tugendhat, CUCA Member
- Adair Turner, Lord Turner, CUCA chairman
- Willie Whitelaw, Viscount, KT, CH, MC, PC, DL, CUCA Member

=== Other ===
- Mohammad Amin, chairman of Conservative Muslim Forum, CUCA Member
- Godfrey Barker, Journalist & Author, CUCA chairman (Easter 1966)
- Sir David Eady, High Court Judge, CUCA chairman (Lent 1964)
- Tim Kevan, Barrister, CUCA chairman (Michaelmas 1992)
- Miles Millar, Screenwriter & Producer, CUCA chairman (Easter 1989)
- Sir Simon Milton, Leader of Westminster City Council, CUCA chairman (Michaelmas 1982)
- Peter Riddell, CBE, PC, Commissioner for Public Appointments, CUCA Treasurer (1967)
- Andrew Roberts, Historian, CUCA chairman (Michaelmas 1984)
- Charles Hampden-Turner, Philosopher, CUCA chairman (Michaelmas 1957)
- Milo Yiannopoulos, Polemicist and Writer, CUCA Member (2010)

== See also ==
- Cambridge University Labour Club (CULC)
- Cambridge University Liberal Association (CULA)
