= Zahida Manzoor =

British Conservative politician (born 1958)

The Right Honourable The Baroness Manzoor CBE
- زاہدہ پروین منظور
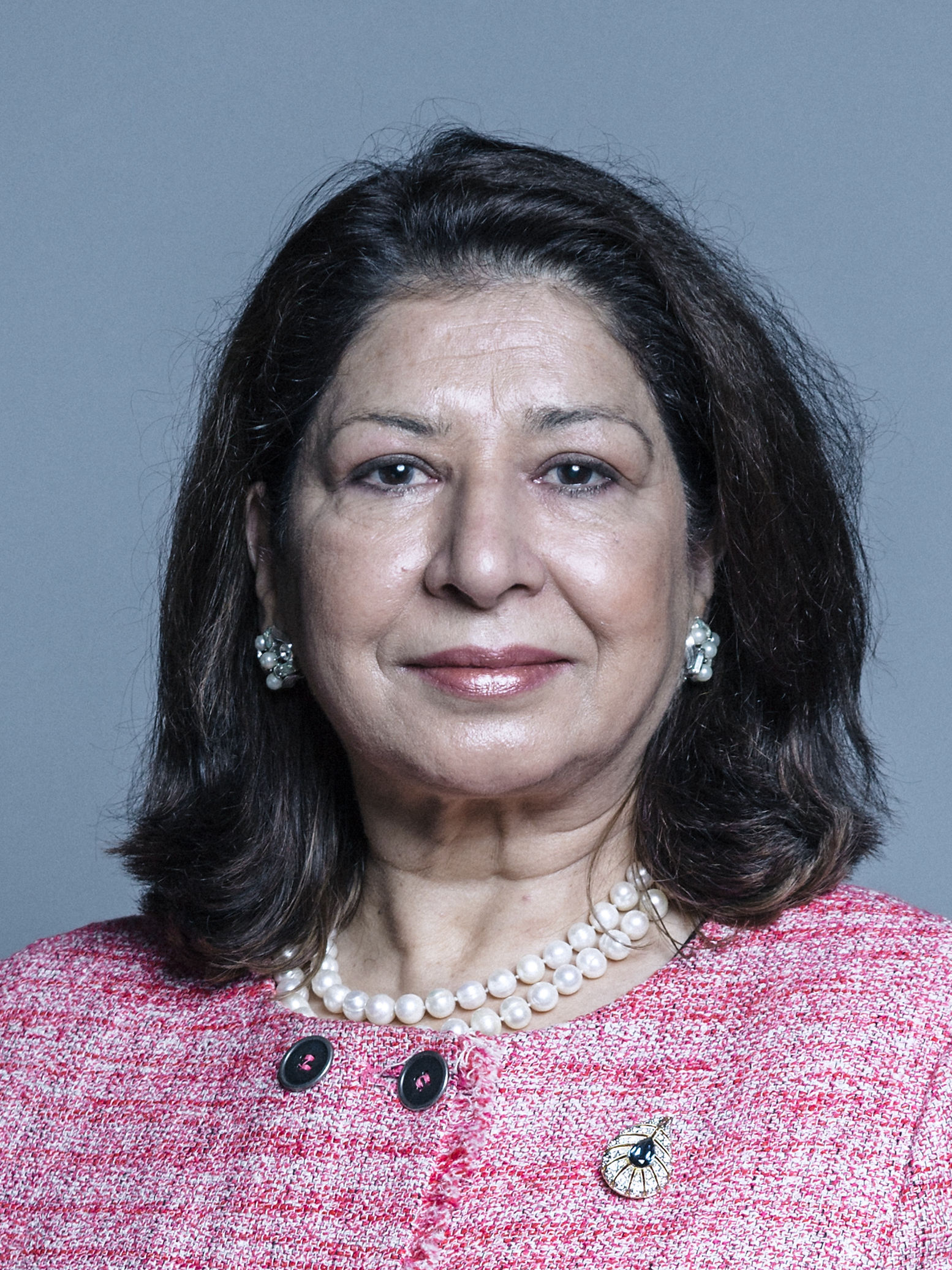
- Official portrait, 2018

Baroness-in-Waiting Government Whip
- In office 29 March 2018 – 7 May 2019
- Prime Minister: Theresa May
- Preceded by: The Baroness Chisholm of Owlpen
- Succeeded by: The Baroness Barran

Liberal Democrat Spokesperson for Work and Pensions
- In office 29 July 2015 – 9 October 2016
- Leader: Tim Farron
- Preceded by: Steve Webb
- Succeeded by: The Baroness Bakewell

Member of the House of Lords
- Lord Temporal
- Life peerage 6 September 2013

Financial Ombudsman Service Chair
- Incumbent
- Assumed office 1 August 2019

Personal details
- Born: Zahida Parveen Manzoor; 25 May 1958 (age 68) Rawalpindi, Punjab, Pakistan
- Party: Conservative Party (since 2016)
- Other political affiliations: Liberal Democrats (until 2016)
- Spouse: Madassar Manzoor (m. 1984)
- Children: 2
- Education: University of Leeds (BSc); University of Bradford (MA)
- Occupation: Politician; businesswoman

Zahida Parveen Manzoor, Baroness Manzoor, CBE (born 25 May 1958) is a British businesswoman and Conservative member of the House of Lords.

== Early life ==
Manzoor was born in Rawalpindi, Pakistan to Nazir Ahmed (military veteran and businessman) and Mahroof Ahmed who moved to England when she was four years old. She became a nurse before attending the University of Leeds (1983) and receiving an MA from the University of Bradford in 1989. She became a lecturer before moving on to hold a number of senior positions in the NHS and then the regulation of legal services.

== Public life ==
From 1992 to 1997 Manzoor served as the Chairman of Bradford Health Authority before being appointed as one of the eight Regional Chairmen for the National Health Service (NHS). In this role she was responsible for the Northern and Yorkshire Region of the NHS with a budget of £3.5 billion and serving a population of 6.3 million. She held this position from 1997 to 2001 during which time she also served as a member of the Policy Board for the NHS.

In 1993 Manzoor became a member of the Commission for Racial Equality, going on to serve as Deputy Chairman from 1993–1995. Since 1999 she has been an Independent Assessor for the Foreign Office. From 1997-2003 she served as a Trustee on the Board of the National Society for the Protection of Cruelty to Children (NSPCC). From 1996-2003 she was co-founder and Director of Intellisys Limited, an information technology and management consultancy business. In 1992 she was appointed by the Privy Council as a Court Member of the University of Bradford. From 1991-1993 she was a member of the Board of Governors of Sheffield Hallam University. From 1990-1996 she was Regional Director for the Common Purpose Charitable Trust. She was awarded a CBE in 1998.

From 2003 to 2011 she served as the Legal Services Ombudsman for England and Wales, reporting directly to Parliament. During this period Manzoor made improvements in the way legal professional bodies, such as the Law Society and the Bar Council, dealt with complaints from members of the public. She also instigated a major investigation into the handling of personal injury claims for coal miners, resulting in redress for the coal miners and some solicitors being barred from practice.

In 2004 the Lord Chancellor also appointed Manzoor to the role of Legal Services Complaints Commissioner for England and Wales. In this role Manzoor served as the Statutory Regulator responsible for overseeing the handling of complaints by the Law Society and was given substantial powers to set performance improvement targets and impose financial penalties of up to £1 million for failure to meet those targets. She used these powers to drive improvements in the Law Society's handling of complaints. This appointment ended in April 2010.

Manzoor was appointed by the FCA as chair of the Financial Ombudsman Service in 2019, commencing the role in August of that year; she was re-appointed in 2023 to a second three-year term. Under Manzoor's chairwomanship, the FOS experienced a number of unplanned changes in senior leadership, culminating in the resignation of Abby Thomas as chief executive of the FOS in early 2024 following a dispute regarding fees to be levied upon claims management companies, which was reported to have led to Thomas losing Manzoor's confidence. Manzoor announced in February 2025 that she would step down upon the conclusion of her second term.

== House of Lords ==
On 6 September 2013, she was created a life peer taking the title Baroness Manzoor, of Knightsbridge in the Royal Borough of Kensington and Chelsea. She originally joined the House of Lords as a Liberal Democrat peer. She became a non-affiliated member, having resigned the Lib Dem whip in 2016.

On 9 October 2016, it was announced that Manzoor had joined the Conservative Party. She was appointed as a Government Whip in 2018 but resigned as Whip in May 2019.

== Personal life ==
She married Dr Madassar Manzoor in 1984 and the couple have two daughters. Manzoor describes her recreations as antiques, gardening, painting and visiting historic buildings.
