= Financial Ombudsman Service =

United Kingdom independent complaints body

- Formation: Operational: April 2000; Statutory footing: 18 June 2001
- Type: Ombudsman
- Headquarters: London, England
- Chair: Liam Coleman
- Chief Ombudsman: James Dipple-Johnstone
- Chief Executive: Jenny Simmonds
- Website: www.financial-ombudsman.org.uk

The Financial Ombudsman Service is an ombudsman in the United Kingdom. It was established in 2000, and given statutory powers in 2001 by the Financial Services and Markets Act 2000, to help settle disputes between consumers and UK-based businesses providing financial services, such as banks, building societies, insurance companies, investment firms, financial advisers, and finance companies. It has come in for major criticism over the past decade for the quality and impartiality of its decision-making.

== Overview ==
The Financial Ombudsman Service can deal with complaints from consumers about most financial matters including, for example: banking, insurance, mortgages, pensions, savings and investments, credit cards and store cards, loans and credit, hire purchase and pawnbroking, financial advice, stocks, shares, unit trusts, and bonds.

From November 2009, money transfer operators also came under the ombudsman's remit.

Before the ombudsman can step in, the consumer must first give the business they are unhappy with the opportunity to look into the complaint itself – before the ombudsman service can make a decision on the dispute. The business has a maximum of 8 weeks to resolve the complaint. If they do not resolve it within 8 weeks or the consumer is not happy with the response then they can refer the complaint to the ombudsman service.

The ombudsman has the authority to request or require a company to offer financial compensation, correct a consumer's credit file, or offer an apology, as a means of dispute resolution.

== Processes ==
The ombudsman makes decisions on the basis of what it believes is fair and reasonable in the particular circumstances of each case. In making decisions on individual complaints, the law requires the ombudsman to take into account: relevant law and regulations; regulator's rules, guidance and standards; codes of practice; and (where appropriate) what he/she considers to have been good industry practice at the relevant time.

== Funding ==
The Financial Ombudsman Service is funded by the UK's financial services sector through a combination of statutory levies and case fees. These are paid by financial businesses that are regulated by the Financial Conduct Authority (FCA) or licensed by the Office of Fair Trading (OFT) and are automatically covered by law by the ombudsman service. The payment of these statutory levies and fees is not optional and they are payable whether or not a complaint is upheld by the Financial Ombudsman Service. The service is free to consumers. Between 2006 and 2009 the ombudsman service made use of case-handling services provided by Deloitte LLP, to handle the growing volumes of work generated by payment protection insurance complaints.

== Impartiality ==
The Financial Ombudsman Service publishes the proportion of complaints it upholds in favour of consumers. Across all complaints in 2024/2025 the ombudsman found 34% in favour of consumers.

The ombudsman was set up by parliament to be an impartial and independent body, though its decisions can be criticised by the side that loses.

Independent commentators acknowledge that the ombudsman service is a valuable free service for consumers – although those who feel they have "lost" a complaint might understandably feel let down and want to question the ombudsman's impartiality. Some consumers have questioned the amount of redress awarded by the ombudsman while many businesses expect the ombudsman to apply the compensation cap rigidly and lobbied against the increase (in January 2012) from £100,000 to £150,000 in the maximum compensation the ombudsman can tell a business to pay.

Various websites have been set up to complain about the Financial Ombudsman's partiality – usually by people who disagree with particular ombudsman decisions.

== Complaints-handling performance of individual financial companies ==
Since September 2009 the Financial Ombudsman Service has been publishing complaints data on its website every six months about named individual businesses. The data provided relates to businesses which have 30 or more new cases, or 30 or more resolved cases, in each six-month period. The data shows the number of new complaints, and the proportion of complaints upheld in favour of consumers.

The complaints data shows that:

- just under 200 businesses (out of more than 100,000 covered by the ombudsman service) together generate around 90% of the complaints workload,
- the number of complaints relating to each individual business ranges from 30 to over 45,000,
- the proportion of cases upheld in favour of the consumer varies substantially from business to business – between 3% and 100%.

== Budget and staffing levels ==
The entire ombudsman staff in 2007 (including a substantial number of ancillary staff) was 960. They managed to handle 627,814 initial enquiries and close 111,673 cases which had been sent to for adjudication. The BBC reported in September 2007 that the ombudsman planned to reduce staff numbers to 600, reflecting the decline in mortgage endowment complaints. By December 2009 ombudsman staff had increased to over 1,000 – reflecting a substantially increased workload of 200,000 cases. Currently there are 4,500 people working at the ombudsman – reflecting a substantially increased workload of over half a million cases last year (2014/2015).

Staffing levels at the Financial Ombudsman Service fluctuate – as does the budget year-on-year – to match the volume of disputes it is dealing with. The number of staff required – and forecasts for complaints volumes and workload – are consulted on publicly each year in the ombudsman's corporate plan and budget.

== Status of Ombudsman decisions ==
Around 90% of the disputes that the Financial Ombudsman Service resolves are settled at earlier informal stages, without the intervention of an ombudsman. An ombudsman's decision is the final stage of the Financial Ombudsman Service's process. If the consumer with the complaint accepts a final decision, it is binding on both parties and enforceable in court.

But if the consumer chooses not to accept an ombudsman's decision, their legal rights remain unaffected and they can take the matter to court instead – subject to any requirements set by the courts. However, independent commentators generally recommend that consumers should use the ombudsman service rather than the courts as the outcome of court cases can be unexpected, disappointing and costly.

However, there have been judicial reviews against the ombudsman, brought by financial services companies who have to accept the ombudsman's decisions which are binding in law. For example, in January 2011 the British Bankers Association – on behalf of a number of high-street banks – brought a judicial review against the ombudsman and the FSA on the approach to PPI complaints handling. The High Court rejected the banks' challenge and endorsed the approach taken by the ombudsman and the FSA. The difficulty in winning a judicial review is that the Financial Services and Markets Act 2000 which led to the establishment of the Financial Ombudsman Service requires the ombudsman to make decisions "by reference to what is, in the opinion of the ombudsman, fair and reasonable in all the circumstances of the case".

In a judicial review of an ombudsman's decision brought by an independent financial adviser (IFA), the judge further clarified that the ombudsman is "free to make an award different from that which a court applying the law would make". This means that a litigant has to surmount the very high hurdle of proving that the entirety of the ombudsman's decision was so unfair that no right minded person would have made a similar decision. This is referred to as the Wednesbury unreasonableness principle which applies to any application for judicial review under made due to the irrationality of the decision.

== Accountability ==
The board of the Financial Ombudsman Service is appointed by the Financial Conduct Authority – and the appointment of the chairman is approved by HM Treasury. The board's role includes guarding the independence of the ombudsman – from undue influence by the financial services industry and trade bodies, regulators, consumer groups and government. Board members are non-executive – they have no involvement in individual complaints.

The ombudsman can be asked to appear before the Parliamentary Treasury Select Committee who can be contacted by the consumer's MP.

In November 2011 the Financial Ombudsman Service became covered by the Freedom of Information Act 2000. The ombudsman's website has a page of information on this subject

Consumer satisfaction surveys – and surveys of businesses covered by the ombudsman – are conducted by the Financial Ombudsman Service on an ongoing basis. The results are published annually in the ombudsman's annual review.

Customers of the Financial Ombudsman Service – both consumers and businesses – can seek redress from the Independent Assessor if they are unhappy with the level of service they have received.

The Independent Assessor is appointed by the board of the Financial Ombudsman Service. The current holder of the post is Gillian Guy, previously Chief Executive of Citizens Advice for England and Wales, whose appointment was announced by the Financial Ombudsman Service on 26 August 2020 to take effect from October 2020.

The Independent Assessor reports formally to the board of the Financial Ombudsman Service – which publishes a report in full each year as part of the Financial Ombudsman Service's annual review.

== Abrupt Leadership Departures and House of Commons Scrutiny ==
In early 2024, the sudden and unexplained departures of Financial Ombudsman Service (FOS) Chief Executive and Chief Ombudsman Abby Thomas and FOS Chair Baroness Manzoor drew scrutiny. Abby Thomas, appointed by Baroness Manzoor, had served less than three years.

A report by the House of Commons Treasury Committee, titled "Financial Ombudsman Service: Accountability to the House of Commons," criticized Baroness Manzoor for her "opaque explanation" of Abby Thomas's departure, repeatedly stating it was a "mutual agreement" without further detail. Baroness Manzoor also declined to disclose information regarding any severance payment to Abby Thomas or her performance.

After initial uncooperative responses from Baroness Manzoor, who cited her parliamentary privilege as a member of the House of Lords to avoid answering, the Treasury Committee exercised its power to compel information from the FOS. The report subsequently revealed that Abby Thomas's departure was due to a "collapse in confidence" within the FOS hierarchy, stemming from "fundamental disagreements about FOS strategy, management and operations." This "mutual collapse in confidence led the FOS Board to dismiss Abby Thomas," contradicting Baroness Manzoor's earlier characterization of a "mutual agreement."

The Treasury Committee's report concluded by asserting that public bodies like the FOS are accountable to both Houses of Parliament, and any peer accepting a leadership role in such a body must also accept House of Commons scrutiny. The chair of the committee, Dame Meg Hillier, said:

I’m afraid that the handling of this situation by the senior leadership of the Financial Ombudsman Service has been deeply disappointing. “The attempt to frustrate a House of Commons Committee from scrutinising the actions of a publicly accountable organisation ultimately proved unsuccessful. I hope this sends a clear message to any organisation considering similar action in future that Members of the House of Commons will have answers to the questions they ask on behalf of the British public, whether senior officials attempt to block them or not.

The Financial Times reported that the House of Commons Treasury Committee criticized Baroness Zahida Manzoor, Chair of the Financial Ombudsman Service, for her "disrespectful obstruction" and refusal to explain the dismissal of the FOS chief executive, highlighting ongoing parliamentary concerns about accountability.

In July 2025, the FOS appointed Liam Coleman as their new interim chair after its initial recruitment campaign “proved unsuccessful”.

== Proposed reforms to the Financial Ombudsman Service and redress system ==
In July 2025, HM Treasury (HMT) launched a consultation on the Financial Ombudsman Service (FOS), proposing reforms of the legislative framework in which it operates. The Financial Conduct Authority (FCA) and the FOS also launched a joint public consultation on improving the redress system "to better serve consumers and give firms greater certainty to invest and innovate."

There are fears that proposed changes would favour the financial sector, rather than consumers, with Ministers drawing up plans to enable banks and other finance sector firms to appeal ombudsman decisions.

== Triennial reviews ==
The non-executive board of the Financial Ombudsman Service commissions three-yearly external reviews of the service.

== Chief ombudsmen ==
- Walter Merricks, 2000–2009
- Natalie Ceeney, 2010–2013
  - Tony Boorman (interim), 2014
- Caroline Wayman, 2014–2021
  - Nausicaa Delfas (interim), 2021–2022
- Abby Thomas, 2022 to 6 February 2025
- James Dipple-Johnstone, 20 July 2026–present (interim from 2025)

== Criticism ==
- Employees have left overwhelmingly negative reviews on Glassdoor (with an average rating of 1.9 out of 5), blaming a decline in quality on recent (2016–2019) changes in the way the organisation is structured, although since then the rating has steadily improved.
- Timeliness – In the years since the ombudsman service was created, some consumers, businesses and commentators have suggested that the ombudsman takes too long to look at some complaints. In previous years, the ombudsman has seen complaints about some topical financial matters take longer to resolve than others (notably, mortgage endowments and payment protection insurance (PPI) due to the sheer volume of complaints received by the service. The ombudsman's published annual review (2012/2013) showed 58% of all disputes were sorted out within six months – and 43% of non-PPI cases within three months.
- Questions as to their impartiality due to the manner in which they are funded by the financial services, and that many employees have worked for financial services firms, mostly as solicitors who make up 38% of their brethren. Though the ombudsman service currently upholds over 49% of complaints in favour of the consumer, there have been complaints that the awards are inadequate.
- As an ombudsman's decision is the final stage in the service's process, consumers who remain unhappy would need to pursue their complaint through the court. (However no alternative has been suggested.)
- Lack of fifteen-year long-stop: There is no fifteen-year "long-stop" rule in the complaints-handling rules made under the Financial Services and Markets Act. In its policy statement published in January 2003 – and following subsequent reviews – the Financial Services Authority (FSA) set out why there is no fifteen-year limitation period in the complaints-handling rules, stating: "We do not consider it is in the interests of consumers to rule out the possibility of complaints being dealt with outside the 15-year period that would apply to court cases. Nor do we consider this necessary to prevent hardship to firms."
- Dispatches shown on Channel 4 went under cover at the FOS in 2017 and uncovered a number of issues. These included junior staff saying that they googled cases for answers, never told lenders to write off debts and general mishandling of cases. MPs called for a national inquiry into its work. An independent investigation in 2018 found that the FOS "is performing at a level consistent with its publicly stated objectives."
- In October 2024, researchers at Warwick University stated that they had uncovered “some very concerning practices” at the Financial Ombudsman Service (FOS) relating to how it handles complaints. The FOS website says that, in 2023–24, across all products, it upheld 37% of the complaints it was asked to resolve. Researchers claimed their analysis suggests that, rather than the advertised 37% figure, the “genuine” rate for upheld cases for 2023-24 was 24%, and considerably lower than that for some individual ombudsmen.

== International Network of Financial Services Ombudsman Schemes ==
The UK Financial Ombudsman Service is a member of the International Network of Financial Services Ombudsman Schemes, a global association whose members operate as out-of-court dispute resolution mechanisms in the financial sector.

Other members include:

- Financial Ombudsman Service (Australia)
- Ombudsman for Banking Services and Investments (Canada)
- Financial Services Ombudsman's Bureau of Ireland
- Ombudsman for Banking Services (South Africa)

A list of all members can be found at the International Network's website.
