= Cambridge Union =

Debating society in Cambridge, England

The Cambridge Union Society
- Badge of the Cambridge Union
- Abbreviation: CUS
- Formation: 13 February 1815
- Type: Student debating union
- Legal status: Registered charity
- Headquarters: 9A Bridge Street, Cambridge, England
- Coordinates: 52°12′31″N 0°07′10″E
- President: Joe Hesketh, Fitzwilliam
- Chair of Trustees: David Robinson
- Affiliations: World Universities Debating Council
- Website: www.cus.org

The Cambridge Union Society, also known as the Cambridge Union, is a historic debating and free speech society in Cambridge, England. It is the largest society in the University of Cambridge and a registered educational charity. The society was founded in 1815 making it the oldest continuously running debating society in the world. Additionally, the Cambridge Union has served as a model for the foundation of similar societies at several other prominent universities, including the Oxford Union and the Yale Political Union. The Union's membership is open to all students of Cambridge University and Anglia Ruskin University, as well as members of the public (as an 'open member'). Alumni of both universities in addition to present and former staff are also permitted to join. The Cambridge Union is a registered charity and is completely separate from the Cambridge University Students' Union.

The Cambridge Union has a long and extensive tradition of hosting prominent figures from all areas of public life in its chamber, including UK Prime Ministers Winston Churchill, Margaret Thatcher, and John Major, US presidents Theodore Roosevelt and Ronald Reagan, presidential candidate Bernie Sanders, the Dalai Lama, Bill Gates, Stephen Hawking, comedian Stephen Fry, as well James Baldwin and William F. Buckley. Previous presidents of the Cambridge Union have included economist John Maynard Keynes, novelist Robert Harris, politician Kenneth Clarke, and author Arianna Huffington.

Cambridge Union's commercial operation includes their events business and The Orator, a buzzing brasserie & bar located just behind the Round Church. All profits from the commercial activities are donated to the charity.

== History ==
=== Genesis ===
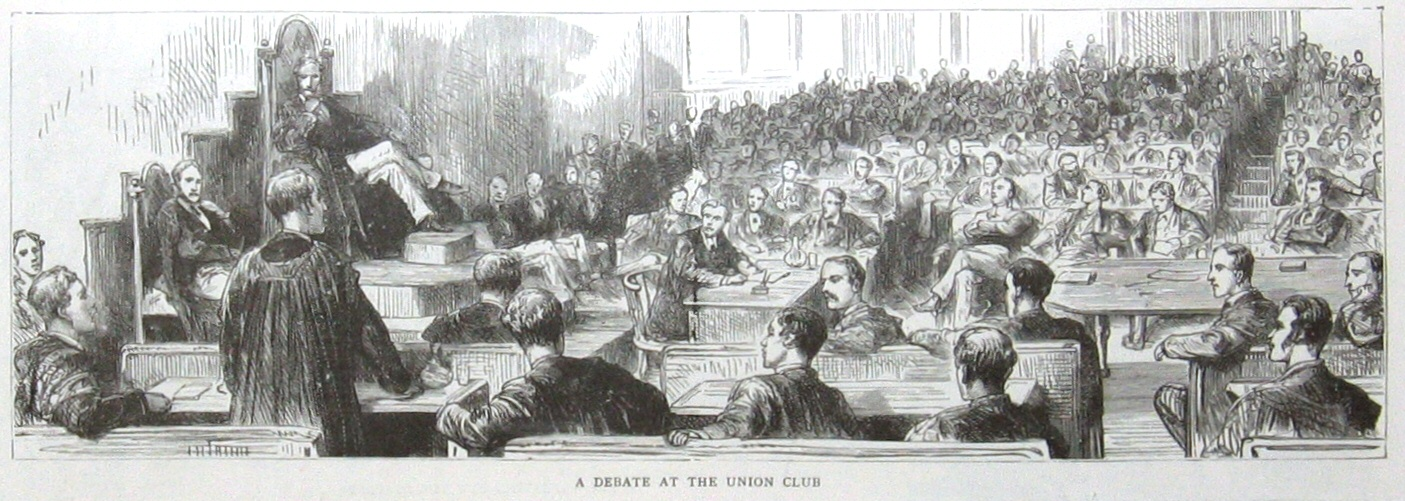
A debate at the Cambridge Union Society (c. 1887). There is no longer a dress code for members attending debates today.

The society's origins lie in a dispute among the members of three pre-existing societies, one being a discussion group of which Lord Palmerston was a member called the Cambridge Speculative Society, an offshoot of the Speculative Society of Edinburgh. The inaugural meeting of the Cambridge Union was held on 13 February 1815, eight years before the Oxford Union was founded in 1823. However, in the political climate of the Hundred Days which ended the Napoleonic Wars, controversial debate topics generated suspicion among university officials who sought to suppress potentially radical thought among students. On 24 March 1817, university proctors burst into a meeting of the society and the Cambridge Union was temporarily shut down, forbidding future debates from taking place.

By 1821, the Union was permitted to resume debates under strict conditions, including that no political topics relevant to the last twenty years were to be discussed. In 1830, the Union regained its full freedom to debate all topics, excluding those of a strictly theological nature.

The Cambridge Union's Bridge Street premises (52°12′31″N 0°07′10″E) were designed by Alfred Waterhouse (who went on to design the Oxford Union Society's building) and formally opened on 30 October 1866. An additional wing was added several decades later. The future radical Liberal politician, Sir Charles Dilke, was the President chiefly responsible for construction. Included among the building's many rooms are the debating chamber, a dining room, bar, snooker room, the Keynes Library and various offices.

Cambridge escaped virtually undamaged from the widespread aerial bombardment during World War II, ostensibly due to a quid pro quo arrangement with Heidelberg, another historic university city. However, the Union's building was hit during one attack in July 1942. The Union was the only building connected to the university to be directly hit during the war and the explosion caused extensive damage to the Union's library.

In March 1944, XXX Corps commandeered the entire Union building for a week. It is rumoured that during this time the Union became one of a handful of buildings in Cambridge used to plan Operation Overlord and make preparations for the D-Day landings.

=== Postwar regeneration ===
Facing financial trouble and extensive rebuilding work, the Union launched a restoration appeal to its life members in October 1945, successfully raising over £3,000 by the end of the academic year.

The postwar period saw a strong political atmosphere and a great many celebrated orators emerge from the Union, many of whom went on serve serve in senior government positions, notably Geoffrey Howe.

On Armistice Day 1947, the Cambridge Union hosted what was the first university debate to be broadcast. The debate on the motion That this House considers that the Conservative Party makes a poor Opposition and would, if returned to office, make an even poorer Government was broadcast live on the BBC Third Programme and drew a very large audience, concluding with the motion being defeated by 503 to 267.

During this period, the society also endowed several honorary memberships upon significant figures, including the Prince Philip, Duke of Edinburgh who attended a debate to accept his membership status in 1952.

=== The 'Cambridge Mafia" ===
By 1960, floor speeches had become an integral part of Union debates, facilitating the emergence of a number of promising new faces. The 1960s is noted as a time in which a number of future cabinet ministers served as officers at the Union. The so-called Cambridge Mafia were a group of students who attended the university at roughly the same time, many of whom served as Union President, as well as Chairman of Cambridge University Conservative Association during their time at Cambridge. Several members of the group, including Norman Fowler, Michael Howard and Kenneth Clarke had attended Grammar schools, reflecting gradual changes in university admission at large.

=== Women members ===
Though women had been allowed into the Union to watch debates from the gallery since at least 1866, the admission of women as full members was a contentious issue. For much of its history, the Cambridge Union was an exclusively all-male club, along with being a debating society. In the 1920s, Viscount Ennismore of Magdalene tried three times to allow female guests to speak in debates. The issue continued to arise in the following decades, with Leonard Miall of St John's proposing a motion in 1935 that certain 'ladies of distinction' be permitted to speak in one debate per term, to no avail.

By the early 1960s, formal votes were held to amend the constitution to allow women as members. Although the majority voted in favour, they failed to meet the 2/3 majority required to make constitutional change. On one occasion, a female student gate-crashed a debate and was removed, with the whole incident being reported in the national press. An amendment was finally passed by 71 per cent in 1965 to admit women to full membership of the Union. Almost immediately, five women had joined as full Union members, with one declaring that 'This is a wonderful night for all women in Cambridge'. However, until the first female president, the decision to admit women had a negative effect on membership in the immediate term.

In Michaelmas 1967, Ann Mallalieu of Newnham College became the first female president. The daughter of a Labour minister and ex-President of the Oxford Union, Mallalieu's term in office generated significant national publicity and saw a record number of new members joining. It is notable that the Union admitted women as full members before any of the colleges, as well as other societies such as the Footlights, did.

=== Modern developments ===
The Union is legally a self-funded charity that owns and has full control over its private property and buildings in the Cambridge city centre. It enjoys strong relations with the university, and allows other student societies to hire rooms for a nominal cost. Guests are sometimes admitted to Union events for a charge.

After more than 200 years, the Cambridge Union is best known for its debates, which receive national and international media attention. The top members of its debating team compete internationally against other top debating societies. The program also includes special events, such as a comedy debate in collaboration with the Cambridge Footlights. The Union also organises talks by visiting speakers and a wide array of events throughout the academic year.

The Cambridge Union is sometimes confused with the Cambridge University Students' Union, the student representative body set up in 1971; consequently, the term 'President of the Union' may cause confusion. Although the Cambridge Union has never functioned as a students' union in the modern sense, it did briefly affiliate to the UK's National Union of Students in 1924.

In 2015 the Union celebrated its bicentenary; a committee composed of former and current Officers was put together to organise a range of events to mark the occasion. This included special debates, dinners and parties in Cambridge and, for the first time in its history, in London.

=== 2016 redevelopment project ===
In January 2015 the Union announced a £9.5m refurbishment project to begin in late 2016 to address major structural problems and to expand existing facilities, subject to approval by planners, to include a new Wine Bar on the ground floor and a Jazz & Comedy Club in the basement (in the old home of the Cambridge Footlights). It also announced a plan to use the revenue generated from the new building to reduce membership fees to make the Union more accessible to students from lower income backgrounds, and to increase the size of its competitive debating activities for disadvantaged children and students.

The development was to be partially financed through the leasing of disused parts of its site to Trinity College in a deal worth £4.5 million. Planning permission was received in 2016, and a fundraising campaign to cover the remaining cost was to be launched on 11 March 2017 with a special debate between Jon Snow and Nick Robinson. Construction on the major redevelopment project was scheduled to begin in Michaelmas 2018.

=== Gallery ===
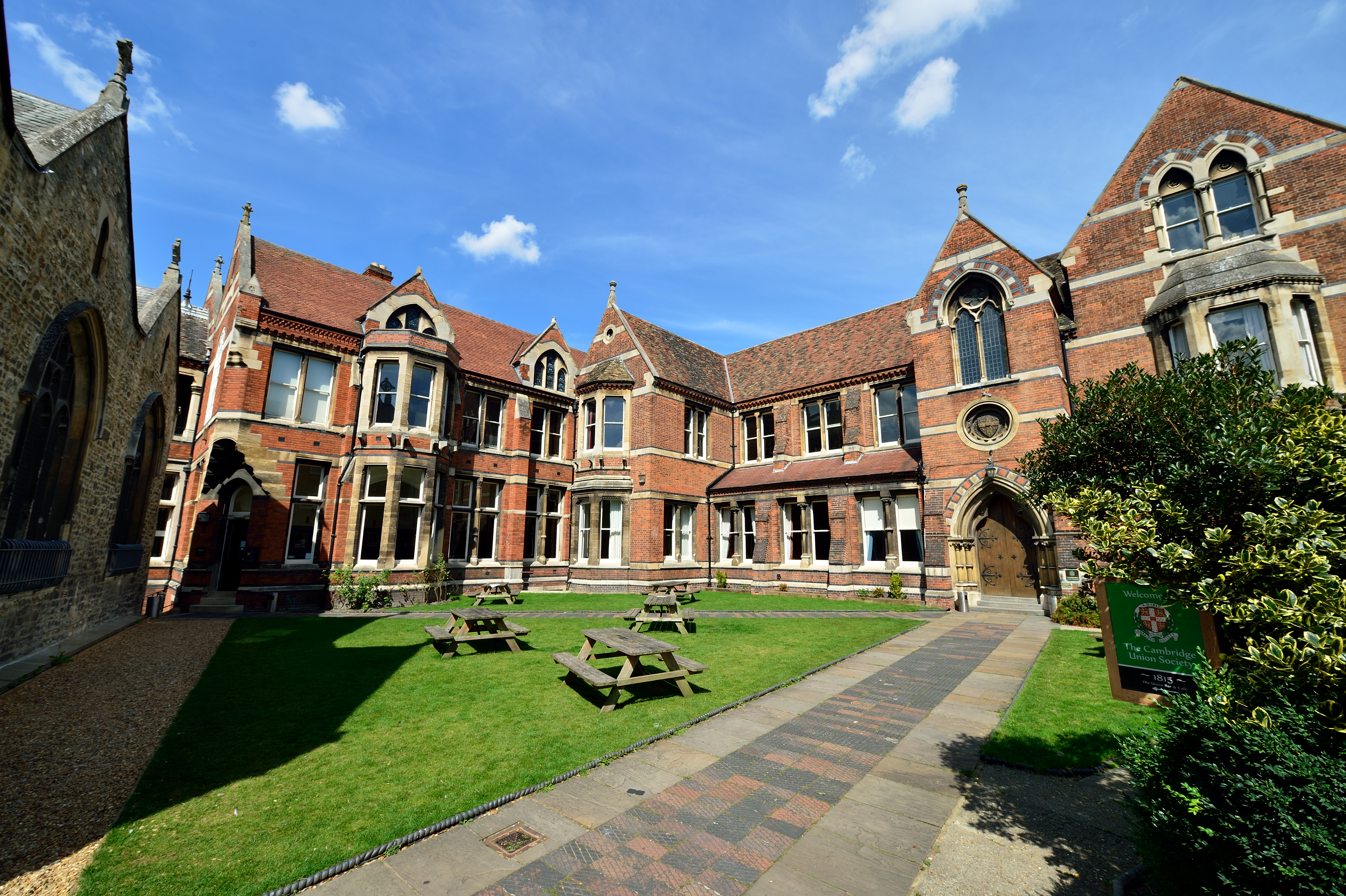
The Cambridge Union

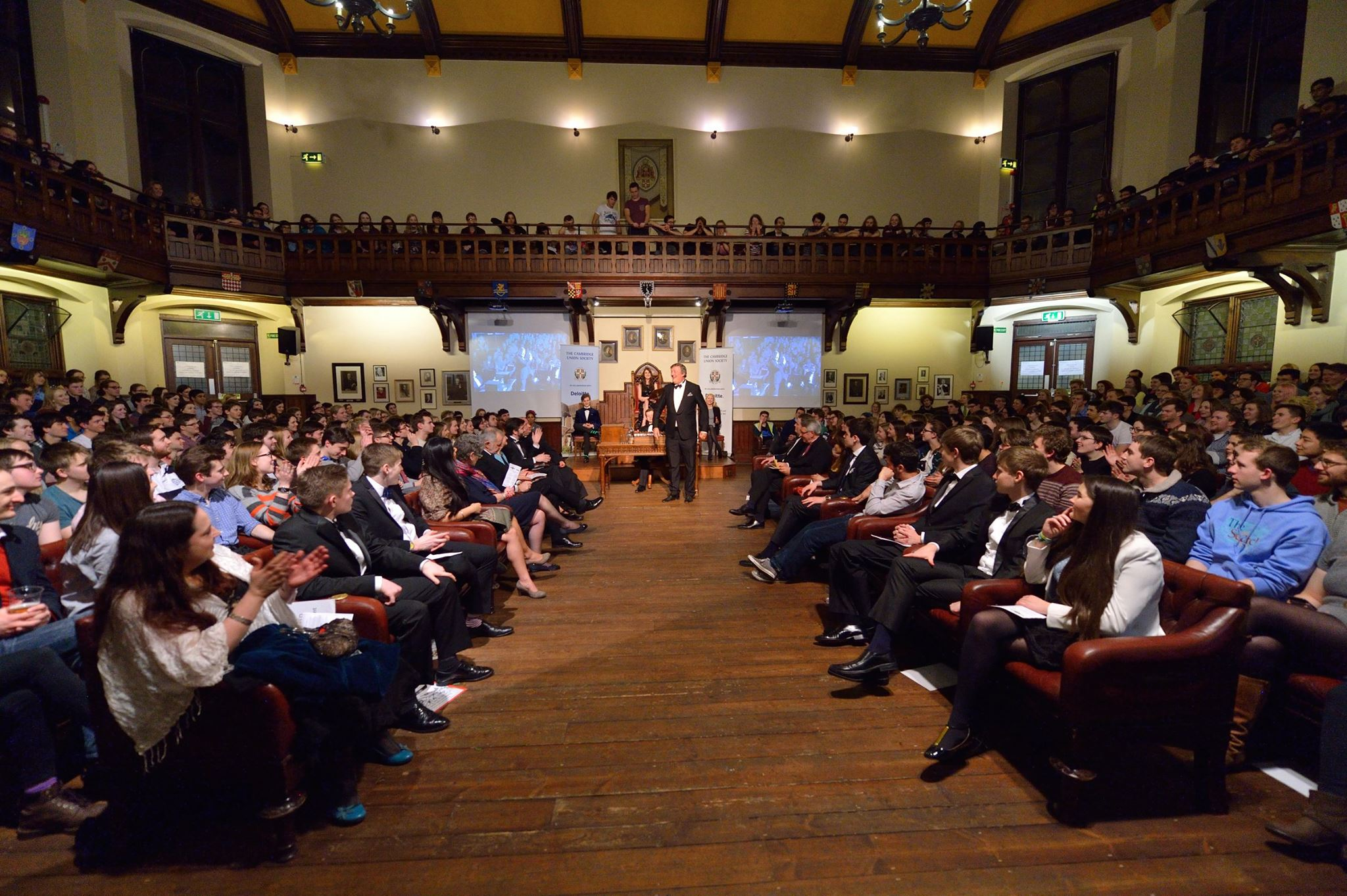
The Main Chamber

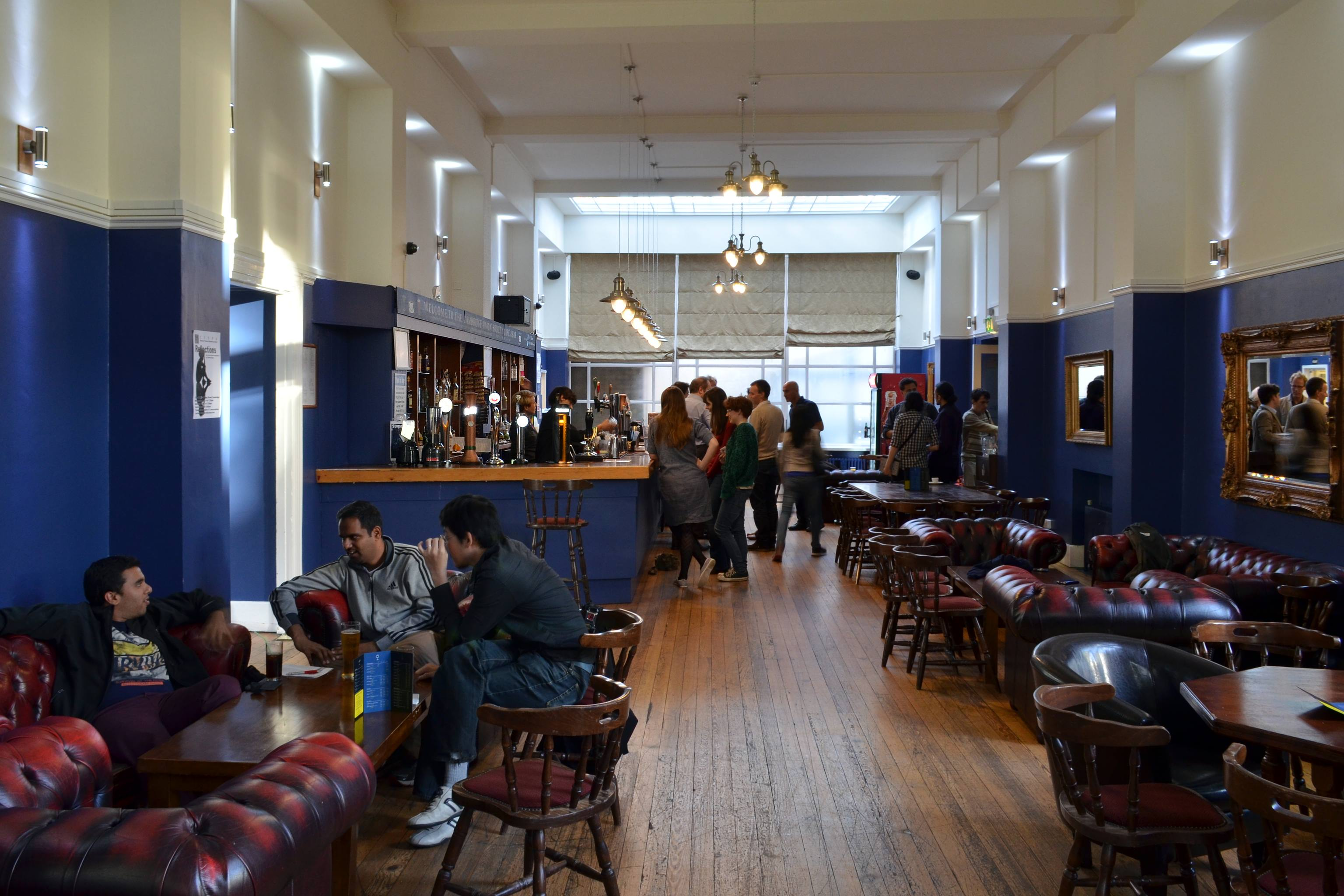
The 1815 Bar and Cafe

== Membership ==
The Cambridge Union receives no formal funding from the university and raises funds for event expenses and building maintenance through membership fees and sponsorship.

Membership is now open to all students at the University of Cambridge and Anglia Ruskin University. Members are able to bring guests to certain functions provided that the guests would not be allowed to purchase membership. Social events and events organised by external bodies are occasionally open to the public, with discounts for Union members.

The Union launched online membership in late 2015, which allowed any student around the world access to live streams of events for an annual subscription.

=== Honorary members ===
The union awards honorary memberships to particularly distinguished individuals. Honorary members include:

- Raif Badawi
- Ensaf Haidar
- Prince Philip, Duke of Edinburgh
- Anne, Princess Royal
- John Major
- Alfred Waterhouse
- Desmond Tutu
- Stephen Hawking
- Harold Macmillan
- F. W. de Klerk
- Lech Wałęsa
- Jesse Jackson
- Ronald Reagan
- Bernie Sanders

== Speakers and debates ==
The Union puts on a wide variety of events for its members, but is best known for its Thursday night debates and individual speaker events. In both of these, leading figures from public life are invited to discuss something of interest to the membership. One of the Union's most famous debates in recent years was between Richard Dawkins and Rowan Williams in February 2013, on the motion, 'This House Believes Religion has no place in the 21st Century', which was rejected by the assembled members. The Union's debates regarding religion have also created several controversial incidents, including in October 2013, when Peter Hitchens, speaking in favour of the motion This House Regrets the Rise of New Atheism, appeared to break the rules of the House by physically intimidating Lord Desai after a heated exchange.

=== 1965 Baldwin-Buckley debate ===
Arguably the most notable debate to have been held at the Union was the 1965 Baldwin–Buckley debate. The debate, which was televised by the BBC, featured writer and civil rights activist James Baldwin and leading American conservative intellectual William F. Buckley. The motion under consideration was that This House Believes The American Dream is at the Expense of the American Negro and the proposition won by a landslide. At the time the debate received extensive coverage on both sides of the Atlantic, and in subsequent years has come to be seen as a significant moment in the US Civil Rights Movement.

=== Speakers ===
The Union has a long history of receiving addresses from prominent figures. Past high-profile speakers include:

- British prime ministers Winston Churchill, Clement Attlee, Edward Heath, Margaret Thatcher, John Major, Theresa May and Boris Johnson
- US presidents Theodore Roosevelt and Ronald Reagan
- The first Prime Minister of India Jawaharlal Nehru
- Haile Selassie, Emperor of Ethiopia
- The first democratically elected President of Iraq Jalal Talabani,
- The last president of apartheid-era South Africa, F. W. de Klerk
- German Chancellor Helmut Kohl
- Australian prime minister John Howard
- Libyan dictator Muammar al-Gaddafi
- The spiritual leader of Tibet, the 14th Dalai Lama
- Prominent Conservative politicians Michael Portillo, Jacob Rees-Mogg, Jeremy Hunt and Andrea Leadsom
- Prominent Labour politicians Jeremy Corbyn, Emily Thornberry
- Prominent Reform UK politicians Nigel Farage, Richard Tice
- American presidential candidate and Vermont senator Bernie Sanders
- Speaker of the US House of Representatives Nancy Pelosi
- French presidential candidate Marine Le Pen
- Microsoft co-founder and philanthropist Bill Gates
- Theoretical physicist Stephen Hawking
- Prominent American Scientist Vivek Lall
- African-American writer and activist James Baldwin
- Academic Germaine Greer
- Artificial intelligence engineer Tshilidzi Marwala
- Economists Ha Joon Chang and Jeffrey Sachs
- Wikileaks founder Julian Assange
- Actors Brian Blessed, Bradley Whitford, Judi Dench, Clint Eastwood, Roger Moore, Bill Nighy and Robert De Niro
- Former head of the IMF Dominique Strauss-Kahn
- Chat show host Jerry Springer
- Actress and model Pamela Anderson
- Magician David Blaine
- Comedian and political activist Russell Brand
- American civil rights activists Jesse Jackson and Al Sharpton
- Second person to walk on the Moon Buzz Aldrin.
- Actress and activist Rose McGowan
- Professor and author Jordan Peterson
- American EPA administrator Andrew Wheeler
- American conservative commentator Ben Shapiro
- OpenAI CEO Sam Altman
- PayPal co-founder and political activist Peter Thiel
- Founder and CEO of American hedge fund Citadel, Ken Griffin
- American socialist commentator and Twitch streamer Hasan Piker

== Governance ==
The Cambridge Union is an organisation that was founded and is headed by students. Each term is planned and carried out by a mixture of elected officers and appointed student staff, with support from the organisation's non-student staff and trustees. The governance of the Cambridge Union is mandated by its Constitution.

=== The Standing Committee ===
The Standing Committee (or 'Voting Members') is the Union's primary managerial body of 15 members, which consists of the current President, vice-president and Officers, the President-Elect and Officers-Elect, and the Debating Officers, Communications Officer and Treasurer. All Officers of the Union are elected by its membership on a termly basis, with the exception of the vice-president, Treasurer, Communications Officer, Membership Officer and two Debating Officers, who are appointed on an annual basis.

Officers of the Union are elected a term in advance, allowing them to serve one term as an officer-elect to prepare for their following term in office. Termly elected officers serve a term (and its preceding vacation) as "officer-elect", during which time they are members of Standing Committee.

=== Full committee ===
During every term, the Standing Committee appoints a variety of positions within the Union. These range from the Secretary to positions in the Events Management, Publicity, Guest Liaison and Audio-Visual departments, among others. Collectively, these positions are referred to as 'Full Committee'.

=== Trustees ===
The Board of Trustees, currently chaired by Mohamed A. El-Erian, is responsible for overseeing the long-term development of the Union's finances and property. Whilst the Trustees are not intimately involved with the day-to-day running of the Union, they maintain ultimate legal responsibility for the organisation, its assets and status as a registered charity. To maintain the link between the Student management and the Trustees, the President and the Vice President of the Union are traditionally appointed as Trustees for the duration of their term in office.

=== Review Committee ===
The Review Committee of the Cambridge Union is a committee of former Officers appointed by Standing Committee under the guidance of the Vice President. It is responsible for handling all disciplinary matters of the Union and may also be called upon to adjudicate on electoral malpractice. No member of Review Committee may serve as an elected officer for the duration of their term.

=== Staff ===
In addition to these posts the Union also maintains an employed staff consisting of a Bursar, responsible for overseeing the long-term health of the charity, Office Managers and a Bar Manager, amongst others. The Union also holds contracts for catering, cleaning, building maintenance, property management, IT services and legal advice.

Members of staff are employed by the Union's subsidiary events company. The President, vice-president, Bursar and other Trustees appointed on an ad-hoc basis serve as Directors of the company.

=== Past officers ===
Many of the Union's former Officers have gone on to considerable personal success after their time involved in the society. Notable past Presidents and officers include:

- Jack Ashley
- Clare Balding
- Gavin Barwell
- Peter Bazalgette
- Karan Bilimoria
- Leon Brittan
- Rab Butler
- Vince Cable
- Kenneth Clarke
- Edward John Gambier
- Robert Harris
- Helene Hayman
- Michael Howard
- Arianna Huffington
- Douglas Hurd
- John Maynard Keynes
- Norman Lamont
- Charles Lysaght
- Andrew Mitchell
- Philip Noel-Baker
- James Peiris
- G. Godfrey Phillips
- Michael Ramsey
- Christopher Steele
- Gerald Strickland
- Adair Turner
- Spencer Horatio Walpole

In addition to the long list of real life distinguished individuals that served as officers of the Cambridge Union during their time in Cambridge, Will Bailey, a fictional character on The West Wing, a US television drama series, claimed to have been a "former president of the Cambridge Union on a Marshall Scholarship", as well as MacKenzie McHale, a fictional character in the hit US series The Newsroom.

=== Constitution ===
The Cambridge Union was famous within the university for having a very long and complicated constitution; it is a common rumour that the constitution is longer than the entire Constitution of Canada. This was in fact untrue, but only just: a quick count puts the old Union constitution in question at 31,309 words while the complete Constitution of Canada is 31,575 words long. If the university's rules on single transferable voting are included, then this Constitution was indeed longer than that of Canada. These rules are referenced within this old constitution, but are not contained.

== Recordings and streaming ==
=== YouTube ===
On 9 May 2011, the Union launched its online public video service CUS-Connect, whereby recordings of past events and interviews were uploaded for free viewing. These have since been transferred the Union's YouTube channel titled 'The Cambridge Union'. Before 2014, the Union only occasionally live-streamed popular events, with the first ever live stream held on 12 May 2011, in which Stephen Fry debated Radio 1 DJ Kissy Sell Out on the motion: "This House believes that classical music is irrelevant to today's youth".

=== Members' streaming service ===
As part of its bicentennial celebrations in 2015, the Union launched a permanent live streaming service, to be integrated with a new automatic multi-camera rig in the Main Chamber. The new service includes the ability for "virtual" attendees to contribute to debates via questions and comments to be read out on the floor of the Union. The streaming service is hosted on the Union's website and is available only to members.

== Controversy ==
=== Hosting of speakers ===
The Cambridge Union, like its Oxford counterpart, has faced controversy over its choice of speakers. Protests have been arranged by students against the appearance of Universities Minister David Willetts, Government Minister Eric Pickles, during which the building was broken into, former IMF chief Dominique Strauss-Kahn, French politician Marine Le Pen and Wikileaks Founder Julian Assange. In January 2015, the hosting of Germaine Greer caused a public row between the Union and the Cambridge Students' Union's LGBT+ group, due to Greer's alleged transmisogyny towards Rachael Padman. In June 2019, the hosting of Malaysian Prime Minister Mahathir Mohamad attracted criticism from the Union of Jewish Students, the Board of Deputies of British Jews, and several former Cambridge Union members including former President Adam Cannon due to the former's antisemitic remarks. In February 2022, the Union hosted the Israel ambassador Tzipi Hotovely in a high-security, balloted event, resulting in protests and minor vandalism of the premises. The hosting of technology entrepreneur Peter Thiel saw pro-Palestinian protestors gather outside the Union building and several interruptions during the talk.

Responding to these criticisms, the Union is often quoted as upholding the universal right to free speech, against the principles of No Platform passed by the National Union of Students and upheld by a few groups within Cambridge.

=== 2015 Counter-Terrorism Bill ===
Lobbying by former Union Presidents Lord Deben and Lord Lamont resulted in the specific exclusion of the Cambridge and Oxford Unions from the Government's counter-terrorism bill, amid fears it could restrict free debate. Deben argued that the provisions within the bill would have prevented the hosting of British Union of Fascists' leader Oswald Mosley in the 1950s, concluding that the bill threatened "an essential British value". The National Union of Students used the exclusion to argue that the passage of the Bill was too rapid and ill-thought out, whilst both the Oxford and Cambridge Union reaffirmed that they were not legally part of their respective Universities and thus were never subject to the bill in the first place.

Strong opposition to the bill from Liberal Democrats and senior Conservative peers eventually resulted in the shelving of provisions regarding universities until after the 2015 General Election. The Counter Terrorism and Security Act 2015 eventually clarified that higher education institutions must retain particular regard to the duty to ensure freedom of speech and the importance of academic freedom within university societies, although it is unclear whether this applies to the Union.

=== Referendum on Julian Assange ===
The union called a referendum on the hosting of Julian Assange on 22 October 2015, arguing that his residency in the Ecuadorian Embassy meant he was outside the jurisdiction of UK law, and thus required the consultation of its members considering a lack of past precedent. The referendum was more widely viewed as an opinion poll on the union's refusal to "no platform" speakers. It passed with 76.9% of the vote. Turnout was 1463.

== See also ==
- List of presidents of the Cambridge Union
- 1965 Baldwin/Buckley Debate
- Hawking Fellowship
- Oxford Union
- Durham Union
- Yale Political Union
- York Dialectic Union
