= Baldwin–Buckley debate =

1965 debate between James Baldwin and William F. Buckley

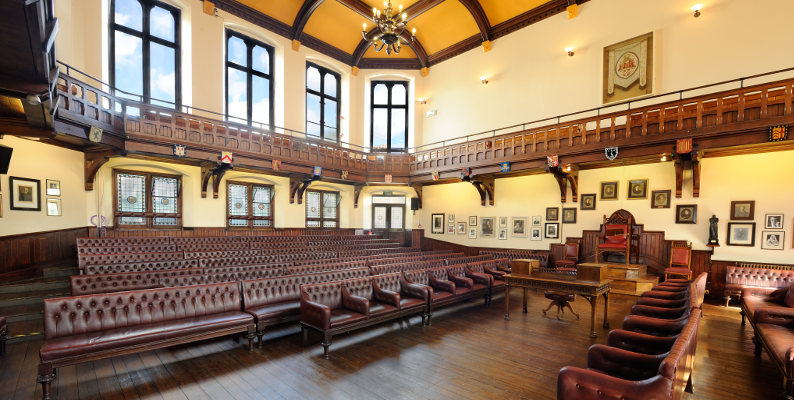
The Cambridge Union Chamber

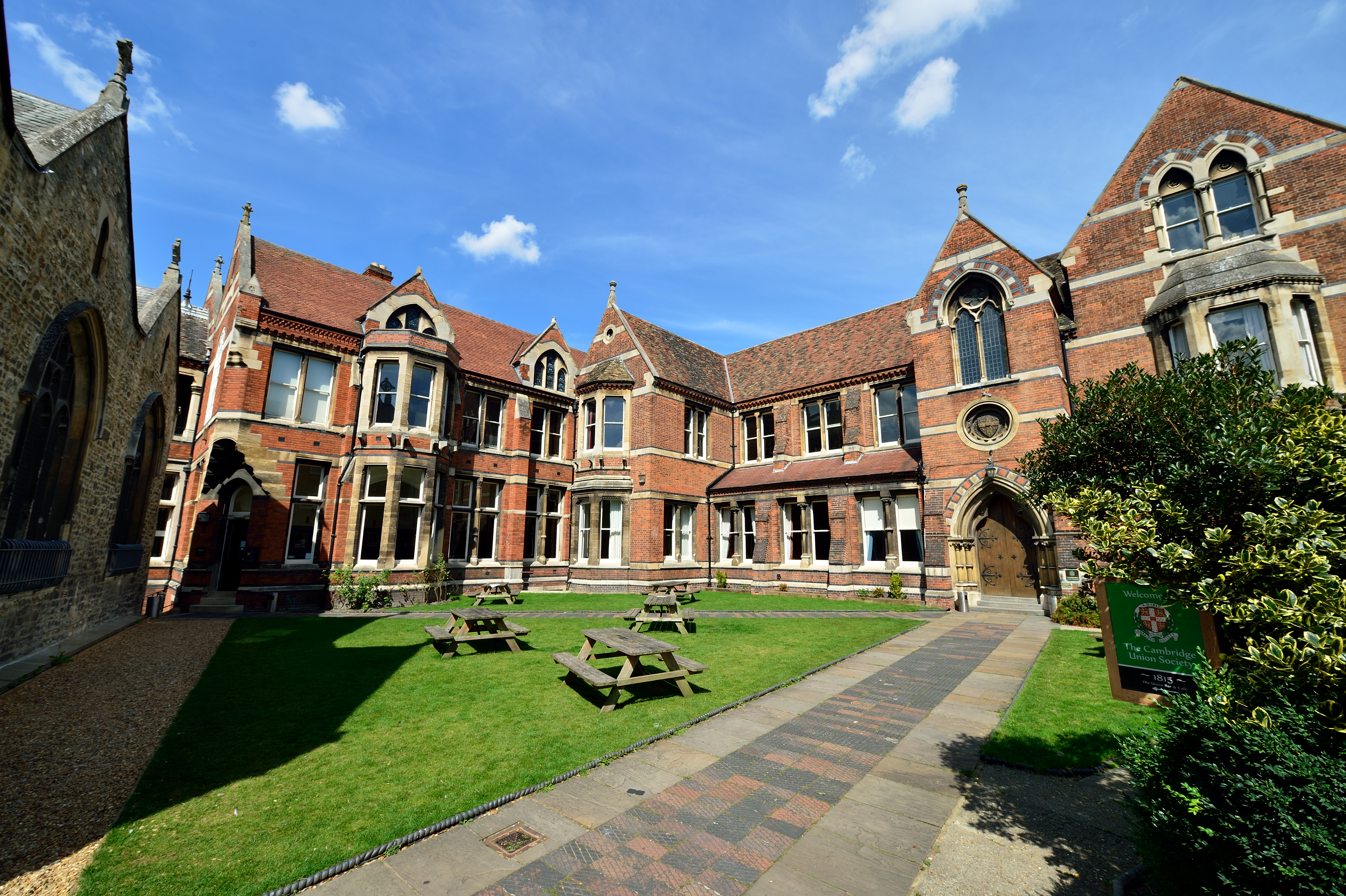
The Cambridge Union Society

The Baldwin–Buckley debate was a televised debate of The Cambridge Union Society held on 18 February 1965 in Cambridge, England, which has since come to be seen as one of the most historic and influential intellectual debates on race relations in America. James Baldwin, an influential African-American writer and activist, and William F. Buckley, a leading conservative intellectual, debated the motion "The American dream is at the expense of the American Negro."

The proposition, led by Baldwin, won by a landslide majority of 380, with the "Ayes" receiving 544 votes to the "Noes" 164.

The debate came at a time of significant social change, with the Voting Rights Act being passed just months later in the US. Broadcast at the time live on the BBC, it was later rebroadcast on stations across America. In the years since several books and dramatic reproductions, along with countless articles, both academic and media, have been produced about the debate and its impact.

== Background ==
In the early 1960s, Baldwin and Buckley were both firmly entrenched on the American intellectual and political scene, frequently appearing in all forms of media.

Buckley founded and edited the National Review, a conservative editorial magazine (sometimes described as the originator of modern American conservatism), and was a leading spokesperson for the American conservative voice. He opposed the Civil Rights Act of 1964 and the Voting Rights Act of 1965. Baldwin, already well known in the US, rose to international fame in 1962 with the publication of his 20,000-word essay called "Down At the Cross: Letter from a Region in My Mind," and by mid-1963, with the publication of The Fire Next Time, he was second only to Martin Luther King Jr. as "the face" of the Civil Rights Movement.

In the years preceding the debate, both were engaged in "intellectual combat." For example, in 1962 Baldwin appeared in a televised debate on segregation opposite the National Review's lead on civil rights, James Jackson Kilpatrick. For his part, Buckley saw himself as having a duty to warn the country to resist the ideas of someone he saw as an "eloquent menace".

Baldwin was visiting the UK to promote his third novel, Another Country, and his publicist Corgi Books contacted the Union to ask if they would be interested in him addressing the chamber. The President replied saying that he would be welcome to participate in a debate, an offer to which he agreed. To find a suitable opponent, the committee spent a week contacting various notable segregationist Senators, before learning that conveniently Buckley was on a skiing holiday in Switzerland. Buckley quickly agreed to participate in the debate, and the 40 guineas (42 £) paid by the BBC to broadcast the debate paid for the cost of flying Buckley and his companions in from Switzerland.

== The debate ==
As is traditional at the Cambridge Union, an institution described as "the world's oldest and most prestigious debating society", the debate took place on a Thursday evening after dinner. An over-capacity crowd of more than 700 students and guests of the Union were packed into the debating chamber, which is modelled after the British House of Commons. A further 500 additional people filled the other rooms on the Union premises, which received a live broadcast organised by the BBC.

The debate was chaired by Lent 1965 President Peter Fullerton of Gonville & Caius College. On the recorded program, the debate was introduced from inside the chamber by past Union President and then MP, Norman St John-Stevas (later Baron St John of Fawsley).

The motion presented was that "The American dream is at the expense of the American Negro." While there were five speakers for the motion and five against, the most notable were James Baldwin and William F. Buckley, giving the debate its popular moniker. As is standard for Union debates, the speaker order alternated between those speaking in proposition and opposition to the motion. All speakers other than Baldwin and Buckley were student members of the society.

Those who spoke in proposition were:

- David Heycock, Pembroke (Who proposed the motion and spoke first)
- James Baldwin
- Robert Lacey, Selwyn
- Sheena Malhosa, Girton
- Michael Horoietz, Pembroke

Those who spoke in opposition were:

- Jeremy Burford, Emmanuel (who opposed the motion and spoke second)
- William F. Buckley, (recorded as a member of "Yale," whose Political Union is a sister society of the Cambridge Union)
- Michael Tugendhat, Caius
- Adrian Vinson, Caius
- Michael De Navarro, Trinity

In the BBC recording, only the speeches of the student proposer and opposer, along with those of Baldwin and Buckley, were included.

There exists in the Cambridge Union archives books recording the minutes of debates stretching back to the origins of the society in 1815, meaning the exact timings of the debate are known. The debate began at 20:45. Baldwin spoke for 24 minutes between 21:17 and 21:41, with Buckley following, speaking for 29 minutes between 21:43 and 22:12. The debate ended upon reaching the length agreed with the BBC, with the house dividing with the ringing of the division bell at 22:41. The results were announced by the President at 22:59.

The proposition, led by Baldwin, won by a landslide majority of 380, with the "Ayes" receiving 544 votes to the "Noes" 164.

== Baldwin's speech ==
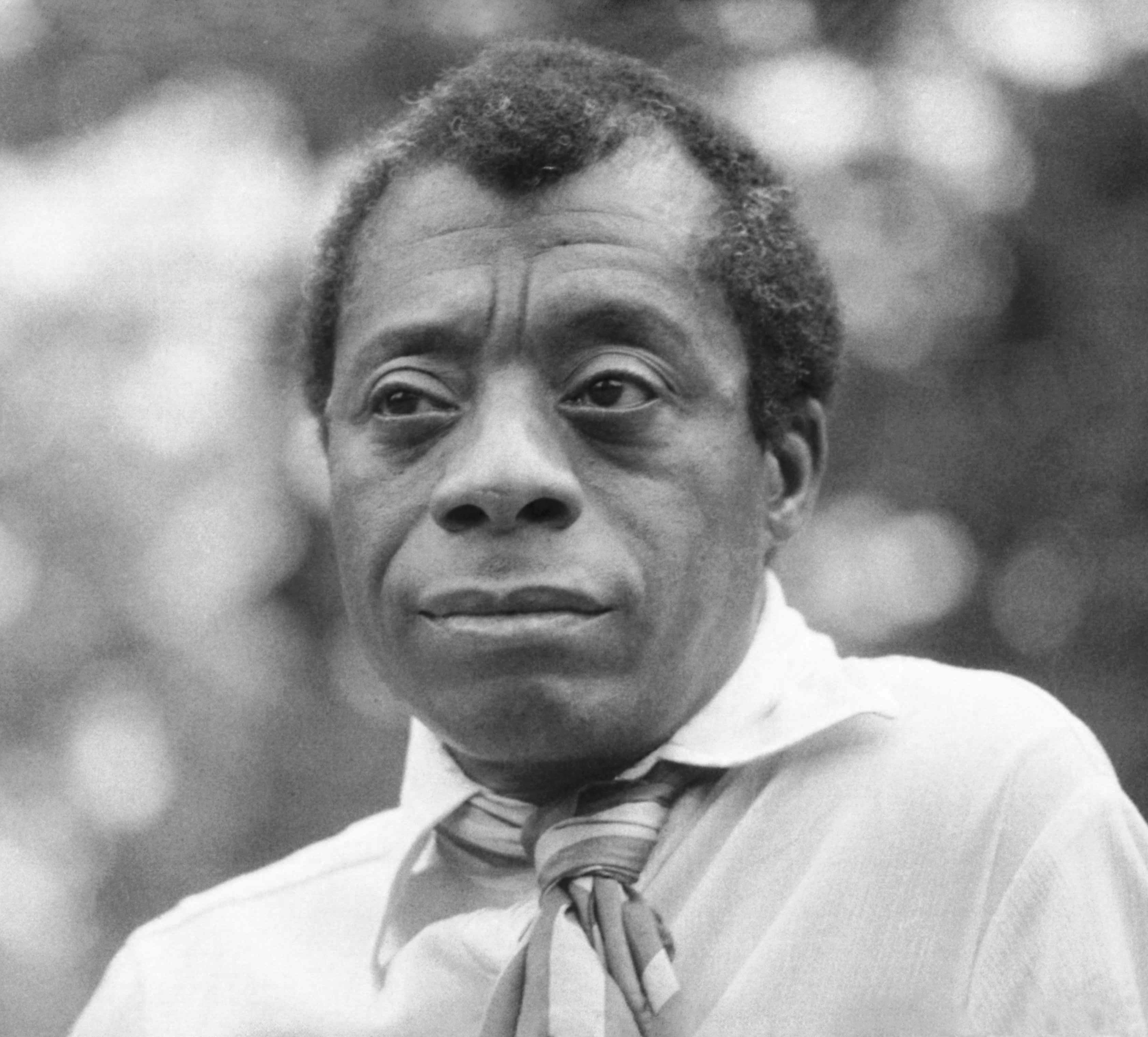
James Baldwin

"There is scarcely any hope for the American dream, because the people who are denied participation in it, by their very presence, will wreck it."

Rather than a traditional Union speech, something that often combines the art of intellect with wit, Baldwin delivered a sermon on the dangers of white supremacy to both the "subjugators" and "subjugated". As a work of rhetoric, it is widely seen as among his best, some going so far as to say it "surpasses even the best of Martin Luther King or JFK".

Baldwin's central arguments were about the systemic exploitation of African Americans and the deep-seated racism within American society. His impassioned plea for understanding, empathy, and justice can be broken down into five themes as follows:

1. Systemic racism: Baldwin contended that the social, economic, and political systems in the United States were built on the exploitation of African Americans. This oppression had occurred from the time of slavery until the 1960s and was a fundamental part of the American dream's foundation.

"The American Dream is at the expense of the American Negro. I picked the cotton, and I carried it to the market, and I built the railroads under someone else's whip for nothing."

2. Dehumanization: He posited that the oppression of African Americans had not only harmed those oppressed but also dehumanized the oppressors. This dehumanization manifests in the denial of the humanity of African Americans, which Baldwin argued, was a necessary precondition to justify their mistreatment.

"The real question is really a kind of apathy and ignorance, which is the price we pay for segregation. That's what segregation means. You don't know what's happening on the other side of the wall because you don't want to know."

3. Individual versus collective responsibility: Baldwin insisted that the responsibility for addressing systemic racism doesn't lie with African Americans but with the whole American society. It was the moral duty of all Americans to challenge and change the system.

I am not a ward of America. I am not an object of missionary charity. I am one of the people who built the country. Until this moment, there is scarcely any hope for the American Dream."

4. Reality of the American Dream: Baldwin challenged the idea of the American Dream, stating that it wasn't a reality for many African Americans who had been denied the same opportunities as their white counterparts. This, he argued, was the fundamental contradiction at the heart of the American Dream.

It comes as a great shock around the age of 5, 6, or 7 to discover that the flag to which you have pledged allegiance, along with everybody else, has not pledged allegiance to you."

5. Call to consciousness: Baldwin closed with a call to consciousness, urging people, especially white Americans, to confront the ugly realities of racism and the need for change. He maintained that America would never realize its dream until it faced its nightmare – the legacy of racism and exploitation.

The future of the Negro in this country is precisely as bright or as dark as the future of the country. It is entirely up to the American people whether or not they are going to try to find out in their own hearts why it was necessary for them to have a nigger in the first place."

Upon resuming his seat at the end of his speech, Baldwin received a standing ovation lasting over a minute from the gathered members, an endorsement unprecedented in Union history at the time.

== Buckley's reply ==
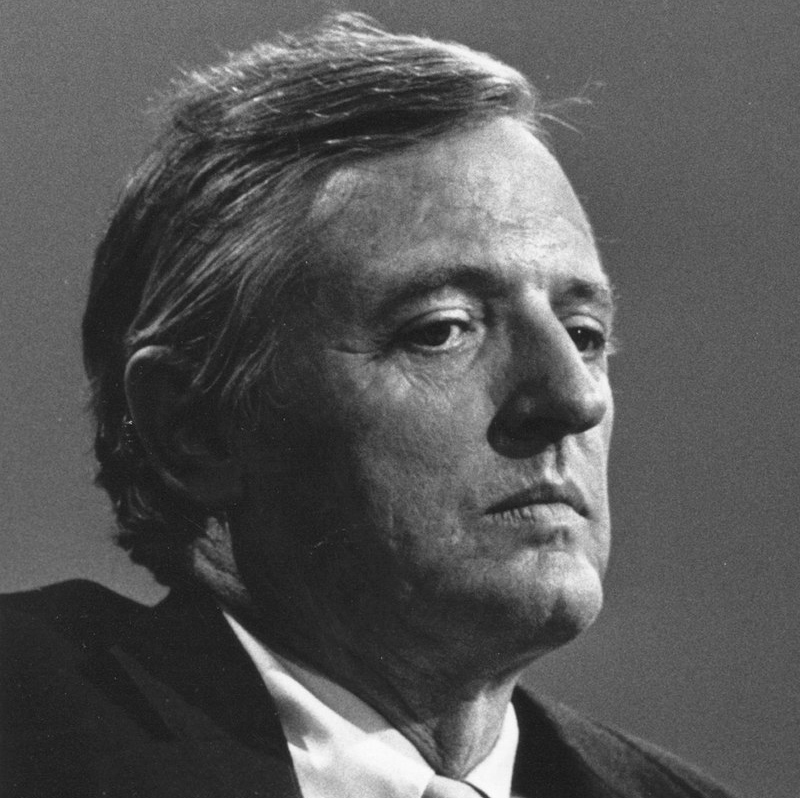
William F. Buckley Jr.

Although throughout the 1950s and early 1960s, Buckley opposed federal civil rights legislation and expressed support for continued racial segregation in the South, in the years preceding the debate, and potentially as a result of the 16th Street Baptist Church bombing, Buckley had grown more accommodating of the Civil Rights movement.

Nevertheless, Buckley fundamentally disagreed with the concept of structural racism and placed a large amount of blame for lack of economic growth on the black community itself. This formed the core of Buckley's argument in the debate. His speech can be broken down into 6 themes as follows:

1. Individual responsibility: Buckley placed a strong emphasis on individual responsibility rather than systemic factors. He argued that the challenges faced by African Americans were largely due to cultural and behavioral factors, not systemic racism.

"We must also reach through to the Negro people and tell them that their best chances are in a mobile society. The most mobile society in the world is the United States of America. And it is precisely that mobility which will give opportunities to the Negroes which they must be encouraged to take."

2. Progress over time: Buckley contended that the conditions for African Americans had been improving over time, citing advancements in economic conditions, educational opportunities, and civil rights.

"I profoundly believe that the American Negro has made and is making extraordinary and heroic efforts to rid himself of the heritage that was inflicted on him, it seems to me, not by the American community, but by nature and by certain specific historical circumstances."

3. Distinction between North and South: He suggested that the egregious racial issues were primarily in the Southern states, rather than a national issue. By making this point, he aimed to underscore that racism was not an intrinsic part of the American dream.

4. American Dream for All: Buckley argued that the American dream was not inherently at the expense of the American Negro. Rather, he claimed that the American dream could and should be attainable for everyone, including African Americans.

"There are individual Negroes, who are among those in the world who are most eloquent. The problem that concerns us here tonight is the disparity in the civilization of the Negro community and the white community."

5. Communism critique: Buckley also criticized what he perceived to be communist influences within the Civil Rights Movement. He associated these elements with attempts to destabilize the American system rather than genuinely seeking racial equality.

"The fact of the matter is that the animadversions against America... by Mr. Baldwin come out in a long and predictable continuum of such complaints, most of them unjustified."

6. Critique of Baldwin: Buckley critiqued Baldwin's position as being overly emotional and not acknowledging the progress made toward racial equality. While Baldwin spoke before Buckley, meaning he could not address Buckley's arguments directly, Buckley made Baldwin the centrepiece of his speech. Brian Balogh states that one of Buckley's key points was that the audience's own reaction to Baldwin is demonstrative of the fact that some African Americans are treated equally, that African Americans were not uniformly discriminated against.

"It is quite impossible in my judgment to deal with the indictment of Mr. Baldwin unless one is prepared to deal with him as a white man, unless one is prepared to say to him the fact that your skin is black is utterly irrelevant to the arguments that you raise."

Buckley was repeatedly interrupted during his speech by points of information (to an extent a standard practise during Union debates), by contrast Baldwin had spoken without interruption.

== Contemporary response, impact and legacy ==
=== Aftermath ===
Broadcast live on the BBC that evening, it was later re-broadcast across America repeatedly on several networks. The New York Times carried a piece on the "wild applause" received by Baldwin the following day.

The debate occurred at a time of critical importance to the Civil Rights movement, taking place just three days before the assassination of Malcolm X, a week before the murder of Baldwin's friend Jimmie Lee Jackson, and a few weeks before the "Bloody Sunday" events of the Selma to Montgomery March.

During this time, Buckley was attempting to explain away his loss in Cambridge as an "orgy of anti-Americanism," that precluded any meaningful exchange of ideas. Buckley would say later that he had never lost a debate by such a wide margin, but nevertheless that it was the debate about which he had the most pride because he refused to "give them one goddam inch."

=== Rematch ===
Almost immediately on their arrival back to the United States, David Susskind invited both Baldwin and Buckley onto his program, Open End for a rematch of the same debate. Without the formal debate structure provided by the Union to allow him to develop his argument fully, Baldwin did not perform as well this time round. Instead Buckley irritated Baldwin to the extent that Baldwin "tuned out", something he later said was "to his eternal dishonour". Some days after this, Buckley would go on to launch his third bid to become New York's mayor, running a populist campaign.

=== Legacy ===
In the following years the debate has come to be seen as a significant moment in both Baldwin's and Buckley's careers, as well as more broadly the American Civil Rights Movement, and it and its impact have been intensely studied across the English-speaking world, especially in the USA.

It has been argued that the debate "anticipated" the ways in which the US would address racial inequality in the aftermath of the civil rights movement and into the dawn of the era of neoliberalism in the 1970s.

Buckley recounted the story of the 1965 debate throughout his life, once calling it "the most satisfying debate I ever had." Yet Buckley himself later changed his stance from that presented in the debate, stating he wished National Review had been more supportive of civil rights legislation in the 1960s. He further said he believed an African American President would be elected "within decades" and believed such an event would be a "welcome tonic for the American soul" Despite his claims of anti-Americanism, Buckley went on to debate twice more in Cambridge, notably in 1973 on Women's Liberation against Germaine Greer.

Little is known of what Baldwin thought of the debate.

In his piece on the debate, historian Brian Balogh noted how the contemporary political divide seemed to have changed its position with respect to this question. While the conservative position in 1965 was that African Americans were in a better position than the majority of the world's population, in the 2016 United States presidential election, the conservatives messaging was that "life is hell" for them. This contrasted with Clinton's messaging which stressed themes of empowerment, improvement, and the work left to be done.

The debate was viewed by millions on its original broadcast, and continues to receive millions of views online.

=== The Fire is Upon Us ===
In 2019 Nicholas Buccola, an American writer and lecturer in political thought who holds the Chair in Political Science at Linfield University in McMinnville, Oregon, wrote a much lauded history and analysis of the debate. His book The Fire is Upon Us won the Francis Fuller award for non-fiction writing. The work focuses on the clash of ideas seen in the debate and looks at the personal histories of both Baldwin and Buckley as exemplifying the wider Civil Rights debate in America, in particular how their arguments still resonate today.

=== In theatre ===
The debate has frequently been reenacted theatrically, often in an educational setting, but also professionally - recently by the "American Vicarious" theatre company, who toured throughout the US and UK, as well as by the "Elevator Repair Company" in 2022.

=== Modern reimaginings ===
As part of the 55th anniversary celebrations of the March on Washington, Harvard Professor Khalil Gibran Muhammad and Canadian-American political commentator/speechwriter David Frum debated an updated motion inspired by the original, that "The American Dream Is Still at the Expense of African Americans."

This reimagining came in the context of the George Floyd Protests of 2020, with Muhammad arguing for the continued relevance of Baldwin's arguments in the debate:

"Baldwin's voice as a novelist, as an essayist, as a critic of the hypocrisies of the nation and its core contradictions, speaks to this moment in ways that few other writers can."

== Media ==
- Baldwin, James; Buckley, William F. (October 26, 1965). "Video: Debate: Baldwin vs Buckley". Cambridge Union Society (University of Cambridge). New York, NY: National Educational Television and Radio Center – via UC Berkeley Library, University of California, Berkeley. "'Has the American dream been achieved at the expense of the American negro?' (streaming video file, 58 min.)"
- The Cambridge Union Society (1965) James Baldwin Debates William F. Buckley. — via YouTube
- The Cambridge Union Society (2020) Panel Discussion on the legacy of Baldwin/Buckley. — via YouTube
- Aeon Video (13 August 2019). "James Baldwin Debates William F Buckley". vimeo.

== Transcripts ==
- Buccola, Nicholas, Appendix. Transcript of the Baldwin versus Buckley Debate at the Cambridge Union. (Princeton University Press, 2019).
- Stevas, Norman St. John; Baldwin, James; Buckley, William F., Jr. "Debate: Baldwin vs. Buckley". American Archive of Public Broadcasting. British Broadcasting Corporation. "This transcript was received from a third party"
- James Baldwin and William F. Buckley (1965) Debate in Union Hall, Cambridge University in The American Dream and the American Negro, The New York Times; March 7, 1965; pg. SM32 — via National Constitution Center — "A transcript, slightly condensed"

- Baldwin, James (March 7, 1965). "The American Dream and the American Negro". archive.nytimes.com. Archived from the original on November 28, 2018.
