= Natalie Ceeney =

English businesswoman and civil servant

- Born: 22 August 1971 (age 55); Epping Forest, Essex
- Other name: Anna
- Education: Forest School, Walthamstow; Newnham College, Cambridge
- Occupations: Civil servant, businessperson
- Employer(s): National Health Service; Northwick Park Hospital; Hertfordshire Health Agency; Great Ormond Street Hospital; British Library
- Known for: Chief executive, The National Archives; Chief executive and chief ombudsman, Financial Ombudsman Service; Head of customer standards, HSBC; Chief executive, Her Majesty's Courts and Tribunals Service
- Spouse: Simon Chaplin
- Honours: Commander of the Order of the British Empire

Natalie Anna Ceeney CBE (born 22 August 1971) is a British civil servant and businessperson who has filled several senior roles in both the public and private sectors in the United Kingdom. She was chief executive of The National Archives from 2005 to 2010; chief executive and chief ombudsman of the Financial Ombudsman Service from 2010 to 2013; head of customer standards at HSBC bank from February to December 2014; and chief executive of Her Majesty's Courts and Tribunals Service from 2015 to 2016.

== Early life ==
Natalie Ceeney was born in Epping Forest, Essex. She attended the independent Forest School in Walthamstow. She took her A-levels when she was 16, then went to the University of Cambridge in 1988, one year early. She attended Newnham College, Cambridge, initially studying Mathematics, where she gained a first-class degree. From 1990 to 1991 she was the President of Cambridge University Students' Union.

== Career ==
Ceeney began her career at the National Health Service in 1991, becoming a manager from 1992 to 1994 at Northwick Park Hospital, later working from 1992 to 1994 at Hertfordshire Health Agency (in Welwyn Garden City), and from to 1996 to 1998 at Great Ormond Street Hospital. She led strategic consultancy projects across a range of industries at McKinsey & Company. She worked at the British Library from 2001 to 2005 as chief operating officer.

=== The National Archives ===
From 2005 to 2010 Ceeney was chief executive (styled Keeper of Public Records and Historic Manuscripts Commissioner) at The National Archives. Her appointment was announced in August 2005, and she took up the post in October of the same year.

=== Financial Ombudsman Service ===
She became chief ombudsman of the Financial Ombudsman Service in March 2010. Her appointment was announced on 11 January 2010. She left the Financial Ombudsman Service in November 2013.

=== HSBC ===
In February 2014 she became head of customer standards at HSBC.

=== Her Majesty's Courts and Tribunal Service ===
Ceeney was chief executive of Her Majesty's Courts and Tribunals Service (HMCTS) from 5 January 2015 until 30 May 2016.

=== Innovate Finance ===
In May 2017 it was announced that Ceeney would be joining the Board of Innovate Finance as non-executive chair.

=== Access to Cash Review ===
In August 2018, Ceeney was appointed as the independent chair of the Access to Cash Review. Working with several experts from across the consumer affairs, charitable, banking and payment sector, the review assessed whether the UK was ready to go cashless and what recommendations would be required to support vulnerable customers and manage the costs of the cash infrastructure. The final report was published in March 2019.

=== Today ===
Ceeney remains Chair of Innovate Finance. She is a non-executive director of Countrywide PLC, a property services group in the UK. She is also a non-executive director of Ford Credit Europe, Anglian Water and Sport England. She heads a strategy consulting boutique practice.

== Personal life ==
Ceeney married Dr Simon Chaplin, a medical historian, in 2007. She was appointed a Commander of the Order of the British Empire in the 2010 New Year Honours.

Political offices
Preceded by Kathryn Robinson	President of the Cambridge University Students' Union; 1990–1991	Succeeded by Bridget Martindale
