= Godfrey Barker =

British journalist and author

Godfrey Barker (born 14 April 1945) is a British journalist and author.

He was the arts correspondent for The Evening Standard and a contributing editor of ES Magazine. His articles have also appeared in The Daily Telegraph, The Times, The Guardian, The Sunday Times, The Sunday Telegraph, The Daily Mail, The Economist, Tatler and The Field in the UK, in Die Welt in Germany, in the Neue Zürcher Zeitung in Switzerland, and in ARTnews, Art and Auction, Forbes, and The Wall Street Journal in the United States.

Barker broadcasts for BBC Radio 4 Front Row and Today, for BBC Radio 3 Night Waves, for BBC TV and for the BBC World Service. He lectures on the history of the art market at Sotheby's in London, on the MA in the History and Business of Art and Collecting run by IESA at the Wallace Collection and at sea on the cruise ships of Noble Caledonia.

== Early life ==
Barker was educated at Dulwich College. He went up to Gonville and Caius College, Cambridge in 1963, serving as Chairman of the Cambridge University Conservative Association in 1966. After a year at Cornell University he read a DPhil at St John's College, Oxford.

He started his career in journalism on ITN News at Ten. He moved to The Daily Telegraph in 1972 where he served as Parliamentary Sketchwriter, Arts Editor and leader writer on political and home affairs until 1997.

Barker also served as an art market advisor to successive Conservative arts ministers from 1982 to 1997.

== Books ==
- Visions of Europe with Margaret Thatcher and others was published by Gerald Duckworth and Company in 1993.
- Vanity Fair: The Rich and The Price of Art was published by Constable in 2008. ISBN 9781845295011
