= Cambridge Mafia =

Pejorative term

The "Cambridge Mafia" is a pejorative term denoting a group of British Conservative Party politicians, front-rank members of their party during the 1980s and 1990s, who attended the University of Cambridge at roughly the same time in the early 1960s. Many of them served as Chairman of the Cambridge University Conservative Association, or President of the Cambridge Union Society, and several of them held both offices. Apart from Leon Brittan, none of them attained great academic distinction at university. The group's contemporaries at Cambridge included satirist and journalist David Frost and comedian Peter Cook, Canadian Supreme Court justice Ian Binnie, historian Angus Calder, Liberal Democrat politician Vince Cable, and Jonathan Lynn, co-writer of Yes Minister, who was inspired to satirise politicians after encountering the group at the Cambridge Union Society.

The period of prominence of the "Mafia" was something of an aberration for the Conservative Party, which traditionally has closer links to Oxford than Cambridge. Between 1955 and 1990 the party had been led by five consecutive Oxford graduates (Anthony Eden, Harold Macmillan, Alec Douglas-Home, Edward Heath and Margaret Thatcher). In turn, the "Mafia" has been succeeded by a newer generation of Conservative politicians, again led by Oxford graduates (including David Cameron, William Hague, George Osborne, Philip Hammond, Theresa May, Boris Johnson, Michael Gove, Liz Truss, Jeremy Hunt and Rishi Sunak).

The "Mafia" were of relatively modest social background: Norman Fowler, Michael Howard and Kenneth Clarke had attended grammar school rather than fee-paying schools. In his memoirs, Fowler records that during his National Service, although he became a commissioned officer, it was in an ordinary county regiment (in his case, the Essex Regiment) rather than the fashionable Guards or cavalry regiments favoured by young men from upper-class backgrounds. (Most members of the "Cambridge Mafia" just missed having to serve, because National Service was abolished in 1960.)

They included:

Name	Cambridge			Political career (in Government; in Opposition; CONSERVATIVE PARTY POSITION)			
Name	College (Subject)	Grad.	Offices	Chancellor	Foreign Sec.	Home Sec.	Other
Norman Fowler (Lord Fowler of Sutton Coldfield, 2001)	Trinity Hall (Economics and Law)	1961	CUCA Chairman Mich. 1960			1998–99	Minister/Sec.S. for Transport 1979–81; Sec.S. for Social Services 1981–87; Sec.S. for Employment 1987–90; PARTY CHAIRMAN 1992–94; Shadow Sec.S. for the Environment, Transport and the Regions 1997-98; Shadow Home Sec. 1998-99
Michael Howard (Lord Howard of Lympne, 2010)	Peterhouse (Economics and Law)	1962	Union President Easter 1962	2001–03	1997–99	1993–97	Sec.S. for Employment 1990–92; Sec.S. for the Environment 1992–93; Home Sec. 1993–97; Shadow Foreign Sec. 1997–99; Shadow Chancellor of the Exchequer 2001–03; PARTY LEADER 2003–05
John Gummer (Lord Deben, 2010)	Selwyn (History)	1962	CUCA Chairman Easter 1961; Union President Lent 1962				PARTY CHAIRMAN 1983–85; Minister of Agriculture, Fisheries and Food 1989–93; Sec.S. for the Environment 1993–97; Sec.S. for the Environment, Transport and the Regions 1997
Kenneth Clarke (Lord Clarke of Nottingham, 2020)	Gonville & Caius (Law)	1964	CUCA Chairman Mich. 1961; Union President Easter 1963	1993–97		1992–93	Paymaster General 1985–87; Chancellor of the Duchy of Lancaster 1987–88; Sec.S. for Health 1988–90; Sec.S. for Education & Science 1990–92; Home Sec. 1992–93; Chancellor of the Exchequer 1993–97; Shadow Sec.S. for Business 2009–10; PARTY LEADERSHIP CANDIDATE 1997, 2001, 2005; Sec.S. for Justice & Lord Chancellor 2010–12; Minister without Portfolio 2012–2014
Leon Brittan (Lord Brittan of Spennithorne, 2000)	Trinity (English and Law)	1961	Union President Mich. 1960			1983–85	Chief Sec. to the Treasury 1981–83; Sec.S. for the Home Department 1983–85; Sec.S. for Trade & Industry 1985–86; European Commissioner 1989–99
Norman Lamont (Lord Lamont of Lerwick, 1998)	Fitzwilliam (Economics)	1965	CUCA Chairman Easter 1963; Union President Lent 1964	1990–93			Financial Sec. to the Treasury 1986–89; Chief Sec. to the Treasury 1989–90; Chancellor of the Exchequer 1990–93
Peter Lilley (Lord Lilley, 2018)	Clare (Economics and Physics)	1965		1997–98			Economic Sec. to the Treasury 1987–89; Financial Sec. to the Treasury 1989–90; Sec.S. for Trade & Industry 1990–92; Sec.S. for Social Security 1992–97; Shadow Chancellor of the Exchequer 1997–98; PARTY LEADERSHIP CANDIDATE 1997; DEPUTY PARTY LEADER 1998–99

A famous photograph, reproduced in a number of biographies of Clarke and Howard, shows Brittan and Gummer as ushers at Clarke's wedding shortly after his graduation, with Fowler, Howard and Lamont also present.

It should not be assumed that these men all operated as a cohesive unit throughout their careers. Brittan and Fowler—who were slightly older—were Cabinet Ministers in the 1980s, earlier than the others. Howard entered Parliament in 1983, much later than his contemporaries, having first had a successful career as a barrister. Clarke and Howard were rivals for the party leadership in 1997, and almost again in 2003—although in the event Clarke did not stand, and Howard was elected unopposed. (Howard had not been a candidate in the 2001 contest, in which Iain Duncan Smith had defeated Clarke.)

Howard was the only member of the group to become party leader, and none became prime minister. By the time the Conservatives returned to government in 2010, Clarke and Lilley were the only members of the group who remained in the House of Commons; Clarke was appointed Secretary of State for Justice and Lord Chancellor.
