= University of Cambridge Graduate Union =

Students' union in the UK

- Location: Cambridge, England
- Established: 1955
- Website: www.gradunion.cam.ac.uk

The University of Cambridge Graduate Union was the official graduate students' union at the University of Cambridge, England. Until 2020, it was responsible for supporting graduate students and advocating issues at the University of Cambridge via University committees and beyond. In November 2019, students voted by referendum to dissolve both the Graduate Union and Cambridge University Students' Union to form one student union, Cambridge SU. The Union dissolved in July 2020.

The University of Cambridge Graduate Union was the first students' union in Britain catering mostly to graduates. It published an annual Handbook with useful information on adjusting to life as a Cambridge graduate student, an online 'Alternative Prospectus' of the University of Cambridge (mostly for new members arriving in Michaelmas Term) and a weekly bulletin circulated to members throughout the year.
