= Tim Kevan =

English writer, blogger and barrister

Tim Kevan is an English writer, blogger and barrister, responsible for the Baby Barista series of books published by Bloomsbury, and the Baby Barista blog, which for a time was hosted by The Guardian newspaper. Tim is also the co-founder of Law Brief Publishing and The Barrister Blog, which has gained popularity among practicing lawyers.

== Biography ==
Tim Kevan was raised in Minehead, Somerset. Educated at Sedbergh School and then at Magdalene College, Cambridge, where he was the Chairman of the Cambridge University Conservative Association (CUCA), he practised as a barrister in London for about ten years, during which time he wrote or co-wrote ten law books. He makes regular appearances on television and radio broadcasts, and lives in Braunton in North Devon.

Kevan is responsible for the Baby Barista blog which, begun anonymously in 2007, was originally hosted by The Times. Kevan left The Times after a paywall was erected in May 2010 and the blog was subsequently hosted by The Guardian. He has also published series of books based on the Baby Barista character.

=== Reviews ===
The first Baby Barista book, Baby Barista and the Art of War, was published in the United Kingdom by Bloomsbury in 2009. The book was fairly widely reviewed, most reviews being generally positive. On 6 August 2009 The Times described the book as being "...a cross between The Talented Mr Ripley, Rumpole and Bridget Jones's Diary...The plot burns up the pages and the characters that range within are all highly observed and coloured with Kevan's acerbic wit...Ultimately, the book is a gallop of a read. It is a clever legal romp, a comedy mixed with ruminations about life, liberally peppered with black humour and layered in farce." The book is also known as ‘Law and Disorder: Confessions of a Pupil Barrister’ and covers the good and bad times that trainee barrister goes through during his law career. It asserts the battle lines that are not only drawn in the courtroom but also with the barristers who are his neighbors during the next year of continual assessment.

A second Baby Barista book, titled Law and Peace, was published by Bloomsbury in May 2011.

== Bibliography ==
- Why Lawyers Should Surf (with Dr Michelle Tempest), XPL Publishing (2007)
- Baby Barista and the Art of War, aka Law and Disorder, Bloomsbury (2009)
- Law and Peace, Bloomsbury (May 2011)

== See also ==
- List of authors published by Bloomsbury Publishing
