= Cambridge Students' Union =

Representative body for students at the University of Cambridge

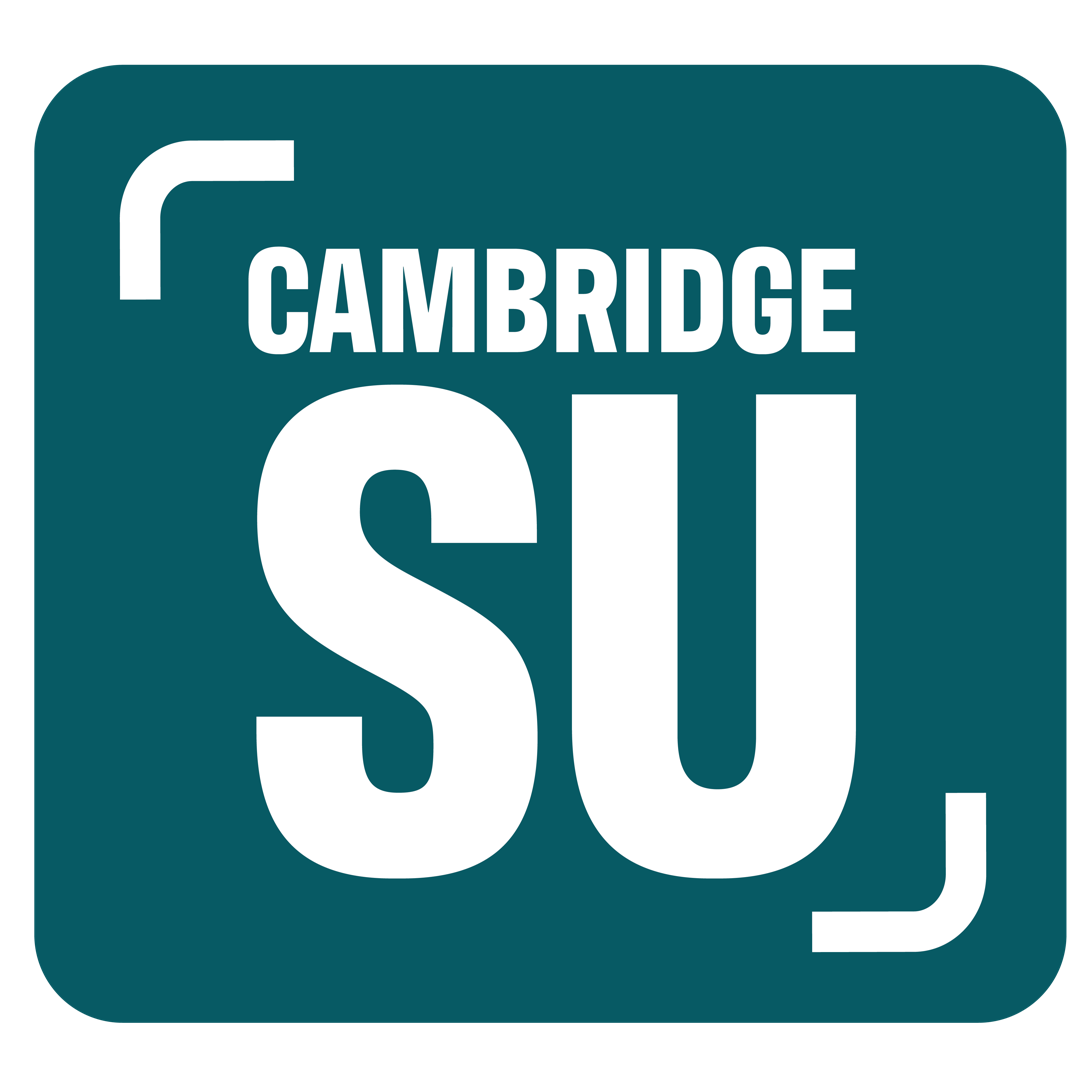
- Institution: University of Cambridge
- Location: 3rd Floor University Centre, Granta Pl, Mill Lane, Cambridge, CB2 1RU
- Established: 1971 (as CSU, later CUSU); 2020 (as Cambridge SU)
- Sabbatical officers: President (UG): Matthew Copeman (Fitzwilliam); President (PG): Augustin Denis (Wolfson); Vice-President (Student Community & Societies): Olivia Ledger (St John's); Vice-President (Education & Widening Participation): Jessica Asiedu-Kwatchey (Christ's); Vice-President (Liberation & Welfare): Melanie Benedict (Magdalene)
- Affiliations: National Union of Students, Aldwych Group
- Website: cambridgesu.co.uk

The Cambridge Students' Union, known as Cambridge SU, is the students' union of the University of Cambridge. Its predecessor union was known as Cambridge University Students' Union or CUSU until its dissolution in July 2020.

Cambridge SU should not be confused with the Cambridge Union Society (often referred to as simply 'the Union'); membership of both is open to all students at Cambridge, but the Cambridge Union Society is a debating society, whereas all students at the University of Cambridge are automatically members of Cambridge SU (although they can opt-out), and Cambridge SU is partially funded by grants from the university.

Until 2020, graduate students at the University of Cambridge were eligible for membership of CUSU as well as the University of Cambridge Graduate Union, specifically for graduate student affairs. In November 2019, students voted by referendum to dissolve both CUSU and the Graduate Union to form one student union, Cambridge SU. The new single Students' Union was established on 13 July 2020.

== History ==
CUSU was founded as the Cambridge Students' Union (CSU) in 1971 to represent all higher education students studying in Cambridge, that is students attending the University of Cambridge plus undergraduates at CCAT (the then Cambridgeshire College of Arts and Technology, which in 1993 became Anglia Polytechnic University, Cambridge, renamed to Anglia Ruskin University in 2005). CSU also represented students at Homerton College, then a separate teacher training college in the city.

CSU during its early years from 1971 to 1974 received support from CCAT Students' Union as CCATSU was from the 1960s the only large NUS-affiliated, and conventionally funded, students' union in Cambridge. CSU in turn supported CCATSU in its campaigns to get more student housing provided for CCAT degree students, a serious issue for the college by the early 1970s. CCATSU and CSU went their separate ways after 1974.

CSU was formally recognised by the University of Cambridge authorities on 25 May 1984 and renamed, following a student referendum in March 1985, as CUSU – Cambridge University Students Union. CSU's second president, in 1972, was Charles Clarke, later a Labour MP, Secretary of State for Education and Home Secretary.

There had been previous university-wide groups, such as CAMNUS (Cambridge NUS), which was founded in 1964 by Gordon Heald, John Bibby and others. CAMNUS arranged certain university-wide student facilities, such as 'CAMNUS Coaches' (an end-of-term bus service to all parts of the country), and an inter-collegiate mail service.

Following a referendum of members of CUSU and the University of Cambridge Graduate Union in 2019, the two agreed to merge. The new union, Cambridge SU, was established in July 2020.

Between 2020 and 2024, Cambridge SU had seven SU Campaigns, which were free to differ from the central SU on policy matters, with six of which representing a particular subset of students. They were:

- LGBT+ (Lesbian, Gay, Bisexual, Transgender and Queer)
- International Students' Campaign: International students
- Black and Minority Ethnic (BME) Campaign: Black and minority ethnic students
- Women's Campaign, known as "WomCam"
- Disabled Students' Campaign: Disabled students
- Class Act, representing students from working-class and disadvantaged educational backgrounds
- Ethical Affairs Campaign, which leads Cambridge SU's work on ethical and environmental issues in the university and wider society

The Campaigns were dissolved in the 2024 Governance Review.

== Officers ==
Cambridge SU holds elections annually for 5 full-time officers.

The full-time officers take a one-year sabbatical from their studies (or directly after they have graduated) and are:

- President (PG)
- President (UG)
- Vice-President for Education and Widening Participation
- Vice-President for Liberation and Welfare
- Vice-President for Student Community and Societies

Previously Cambridge SU had 8 full time sabbatical roles, with this number placing it at the highest end of all UK students' unions in terms of number of full-time, elected officers. This was reduced to five for 2025-26 onwards as part of the 2024 Governance Review.

== Controversy ==
In March 2006, the largest Cambridge college students' union, Trinity College Students' Union voted to disaffiliate from CUSU for the academic year 2006/2007. Several other colleges were reported to be also considering the option. Trinity College Students' Union reaffiliated in early 2007, following re-engagement work by the incumbent sabbatical officers. On 14 November 2010, both the JCR and MCR of Corpus Christi College disaffiliated, following a college-wide ballot in which 71% of undergraduates and 86% of postgraduates voted in favour of disaffiliation. Also, in November 2013 Gonville and Caius College unaffiliated following a referendum which saw a result of 213 votes for disaffiliation and 91 votes against.

In 2015 the university had to give CUSU a £100,000 bailout, but incumbent president Priscilla Mensah denied that this was due to financial mismanagement.

In 2019, CUSU presented a surplus budget, ending what the Union described as “a few difficult years in recent history” with regards to its financial situation.

== Former officers ==
Notable former officers and sabbaticals include:

- Charles Clarke (King's), former Labour Member of Parliament (MP) for Norwich South and Home Secretary, President 1971–72
- Mike Gapes (Fitzwilliam), former Labour and Co-operative and, subsequently, Change UK Member of Parliament (MP) for Ilford South, Secretary 1973
- Tom Hayhoe (Corpus Christi), Chairman of West London NHS Trust, President 1977–78
- David Lidington (Sidney Sussex), former Conservative Member of Parliament (MP) for Aylesbury and Chancellor of the Duchy of Lancaster, Deputy President 1977–78
- Natalie Ceeney (Newnham), senior civil servant and businessperson, President 1990–91
- Paul Lewis (King's), journalist at The Guardian, President 2002–03
- Wes Streeting (Selwyn), Labour Member of Parliament (MP) for Ilford North and former President of the National Union of Students (NUS), President 2004–05
- Mark Fletcher (Jesus), Conservative Member of Parliament (MP) for Bolsover, President 2007–09

== Sabbatical Officers ==
Between 2020-21 and 2024-25, the 8 Sabbatical Officer roles elected at Cambridge SU were: President (UG), President (PG), Access, Education and Participation Officer (UG), Access, Education and Participation Officer (PG), BME Officer, Disabled Students' Officer, Welfare and Community Officer, and Women's Officer.

Cambridge SU Sabbatical Officers
Year	President (UG)	President (PG)	Access, Education and Participation Officer (UG)	Education and Participation Officer (PG)	BME Officer	Disabled Students' Officer	Welfare and Community Officer	Women's Officer
2020-21	Ben Margolis	Aastha Dahal	Esme Cavendish	Siyang Wei	Howard Chae	Kerensa Gaunt	Alice Gilderdale	Chloe Newbold
2021-22	Zak Coleman	Anjum Nahar	Zaynab Ahmed	Amelia Jabry	Tara Choudhury	Anna Ward	Ben Dalitz	Milo Eyre-Morgan
2022-23	Zaynab Ahmed	Amelia Jabry	Neve Atkinson	Savannah Phillips	Kefeshe Bernard	Elia Chitwa	Daisy Thomas	Eseosa Akojie
2023-24	Fergus Kirman	Vareesh Pratap	Caredig ap Tomos	Ani Perysinakis	Maroof Rafique	Ell Gardner-Thomas	Harvey Brown	Rosie Freeman
2024-25	Sarah Anderson	Sumouli Bhattacharjee	Katie Clarke	Neela Maadhuree	Maroof Rafique	Chalo Waya	Elleni Eshete	Nowsha Farha

In 2025, for the first time, 5 Sabbatical Officers were elected to serve (in 2025-26) in the new roles created in the 2024 Governance Review. These roles were: President (UG), President (PG), Vice-President (Education & Widening Participation), Vice-President (Liberation & Welfare), Vice-President (Student Community & Societies).

Cambridge SU Sabbatical Officers
Year	President (UG)	President (PG)	Vice-President (Education & Widening Participation)	Vice-President (Liberation & Welfare)	Vice-President (Student Community & Societies)
2025-26	Matthew Copeman	Augustin Denis	Jessica Asiedu-Kwatchey	Melanie Benedict	Olivia Ledger
2026-27	Melanie Benedict	Jeeves Rohilla	Sarah Misraoui	Tallula Harris	Stella Wilkinson
