= Kind of Blue (disambiguation) =

Kind of Blue is a 1959 album by Miles Davis.

Kind of Blue may also refer to:

- Kind of Blue (TQ album), 2010
- Kind of Blue (book), a book by Kenneth Clarke

== See also ==
- Different Kind of Blue (disambiguation)
