= Florence Paton =

British politician (1891–1976)

Member of Parliament for Rushcliffe
- In office 5 July 1945 – 3 February 1950
- Preceded by: Ralph Assheton
- Succeeded by: Martin Redmayne

Personal details
- Born: Florence Beatrice Widdowson; 1 June 1891 Taunton, Somerset
- Died: 12 October 1976 (aged 85) Wolverhampton
- Party: Labour
- Spouse: John Paton

Florence Beatrice Paton (née Widdowson; 1 June 1891 – 12 October 1976) was a Labour Party politician in the United Kingdom, and a Member of Parliament (MP) from 1945 to 1950.

== Early life ==
She was born in Taunton, Somerset, where her father was a railway guard. The family moved to Wolverhampton, where she later became a schoolteacher. A Methodist lay preacher, she was initially a Liberal, but joined the Independent Labour Party (ILP) in 1917.

== Electoral history ==
Under her maiden name of Florence Widdowson, she first stood for Parliament at the Cheltenham by-election in 1928, and at the 1929 general election, she contested the Rushcliffe constituency in Nottinghamshire. After her marriage in 1930 to the future Labour MP John Paton, she stood again in Rushcliffe in 1931. When the ILP split from Labour in 1932, John and Florence Paton stayed with the ILP. They left the following year, and rejoined the Labour Party, but by then the Rushcliffe Constituency Labour Party had selected H. J. Cadogan as its prospective parliamentary candidate. She was reselected as candidate only after Cadogan had been defeated in the 1934 by-election and at the 1935 general election.

She won the Rushcliffe seat at the 1945 general election, but after boundary changes in 1950, she stood at the 1950 general election in the new Carlton constituency. She lost by only 395 votes to the Conservative Party candidate Kenneth Pickthorn, and although she stood again in 1951 and 1955, Pickthorn increased his majority on each occasion.

== In Parliament ==
At the start of the 1946-47 session of Parliament, she was nominated by the Speaker to the Chairmen's Panel of Members to act as temporary chairmen of committees of the whole House and chairmen of standing committees. During a supply day debate on Scottish civil aviation estimates on 31 May 1948, she became the first woman to preside over the whole House of Commons. She did not, however, sit in the Speaker's Chair.

When the House is in committee, the chairman sits at the table, rather than in the Speaker's Chair; the first woman to occupy the Speaker's Chair was the Conservative Party MP Betty Harvie Anderson (Conservative), on 2 July 1970, who took the Chair during the debate on the Queen's Speech.

In 1947, she was a British delegate to the United Nations.

== After Parliament ==
From 1955 to 1958, Paton was a member of the Royal Commission on common land.

She died in Wolverhampton on 12 October 1976. Her husband John, who had held his parliamentary seat until 1964, died two months later.

== See also ==
- List of political families in the United Kingdom

Parliament of the United Kingdom
Preceded by Ralph Assheton	Member of Parliament for Rushcliffe; 1945–1950	Succeeded by Martin Redmayne
