= Redmayne baronets =

Baronetcy in the Baronetage of the United Kingdom

The Redmayne Baronetcy of Rushcliffe in the County of Nottingham, is a title in the Baronetage of the United Kingdom. It was created on 29 December 1964 for the Conservative politician Martin Redmayne. In 1966 he was created a life peer as Baron Redmayne, of Rushcliffe in the County of Nottingham, in the Peerage of the United Kingdom. The life peerage became extinct on his death in 1983 while he was succeeded in the baronetcy by his son, the second Baronet. As of 2010 the title is held by the latter's son, the third Baronet, who succeeded in 2008.

== Redmayne baronets, of Rushcliffe (1964) ==
Escutcheon of the Redmayne baronets of Rushcliffe

- Sir Martin Redmayne, 1st Baronet (1910–1983) (in 1966 created a life peer as Baron Redmayne)
- Sir Nicholas John Redmayne, 2nd Baronet (1938–2008)
- Sir Giles Martin Redmayne, 3rd Baronet (born 1968)

The heir apparent is the present baronet's eldest son, George Martin John Redmayne (born 2001).

== Notes ==
Baronetage of the United Kingdom
Preceded by Dodds baronets	Redmayne baronets of Rushcliffe; 29 December 1964	Succeeded by Finlay baronets
