= 66th Infantry Brigade (United Kingdom) =

Military unit

The 66th Infantry Brigade was an infantry brigade of the British Army that was originally raised, as the 66th Brigade, in 1914 during the First World War as part of Kitchener's New Armies and served with the 22nd Division. With the division, the brigade was sent to France in September 1915 to reinforce the British Army on the Western Front but was instead sent to Greece and served in the campaign in the Balkans for the rest of the war.

The brigade was reformed, as the 66th Infantry Brigade, in the Second World War in Italy on 20 July 1944. The brigade was formed at a camp 8 miles (13 km) outside of Naples from the 1st battalion of the Hertfordshire Regiment and the 2nd Battalion, Royal Scots, who had travelled together from the Gibraltar garrison and from the 11th Battalion, Lancashire Fusiliers, who had been posted from Malta. The unit's first commander was Brigadier Martin Redmayne.

The brigaded was originally attached to the 1st Armoured Division, recently arrived from Tunisia, but with manpower short as American divisions were withdrawn to serve in France the brigade joined the 1st Infantry Division. The brigade captured Monte Ceceri and Fiesole in September 1944 and went on to make the first breakthrough of the Gothic Line.

The brigade was sent to Palestine in January 1945, arriving at Haifa on 31 January. It was ordered to rest at Pardes Hanna-Karkur before deploying to Syria for training in April. It ended the war in camp near Beirut.

== Orders of battle ==
=== First World War ===
- 9th (Service) Battalion, Border Regiment
- 9th (Service) Battalion, South Lancashire Regiment
- 8th (Service) Battalion, King's Shropshire Light Infantry
- 13th (Service) Battalion, Manchester Regiment
- 12th (Service) Battalion, Cheshire Regiment

=== Second World War ===
- 2nd Battalion, Royal Scots
- 11th Battalion, Lancashire Fusiliers
- 1st Battalion, Hertfordshire Regiment

== Second World War Commanders ==
- Brig. M. Redmayne
