= Kenneth Clarke =

British politician (born 1940)

The Right Honourable The Lord Clarke of Nottingham CH KC PC
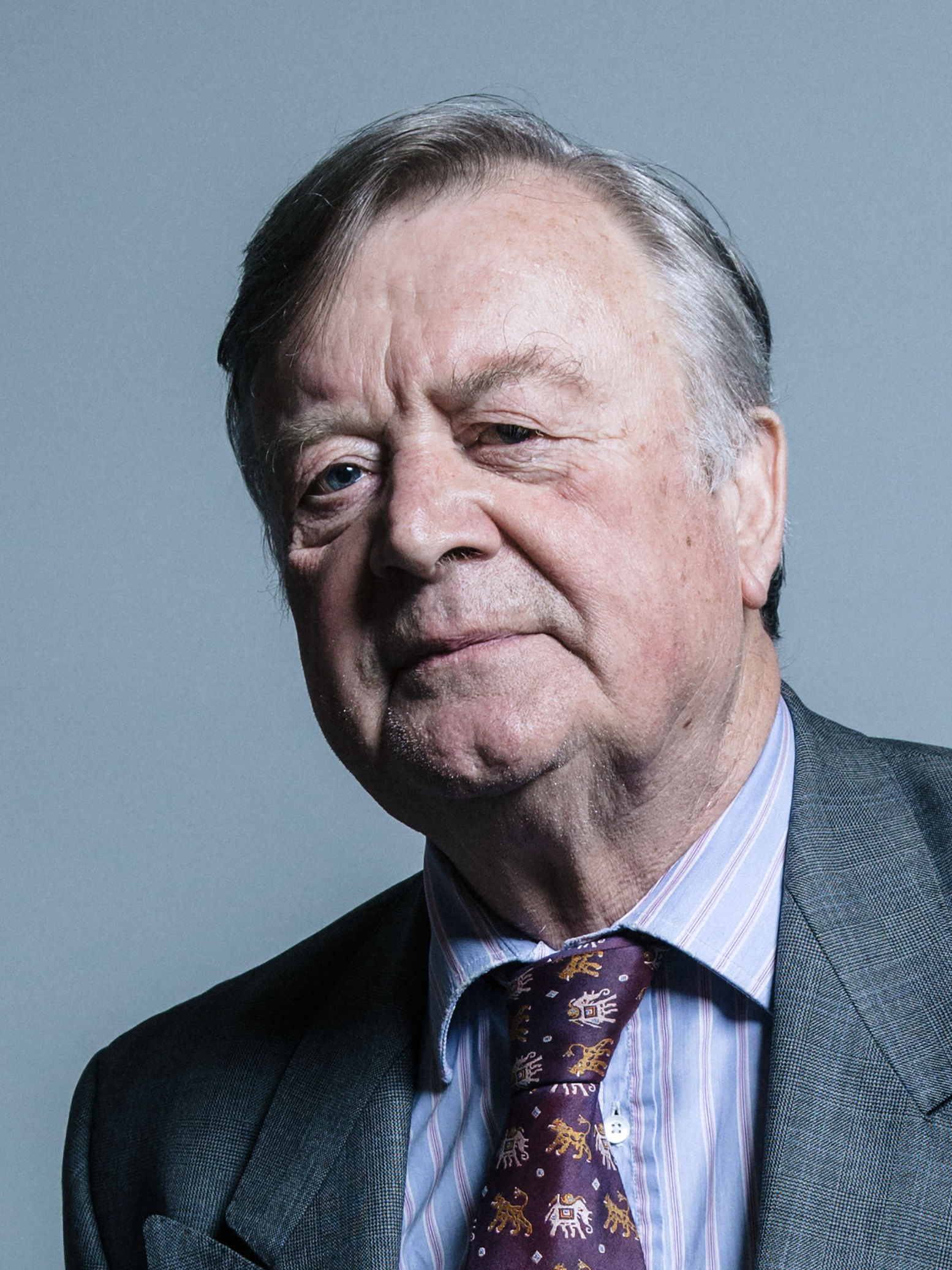
- Official portrait, 2017

Secretary of State for Justice; Lord Chancellor
- In office 12 May 2010 – 4 September 2012
- Prime Minister: David Cameron
- Preceded by: Jack Straw
- Succeeded by: Chris Grayling

Minister without Portfolio
- In office 4 September 2012 – 14 July 2014
- Prime Minister: David Cameron
- Preceded by: The Baroness Warsi
- Succeeded by: Robert Halfon (2015)

Chancellor of the Exchequer
- In office 27 May 1993 – 2 May 1997
- Prime Minister: John Major
- Preceded by: Norman Lamont
- Succeeded by: Gordon Brown

Home Secretary
- In office 10 April 1992 – 27 May 1993
- Prime Minister: John Major
- Preceded by: Kenneth Baker
- Succeeded by: Michael Howard
Ministerial offices 1987–1992
Secretary of State for Education and Science
In office 2 November 1990 – 10 April 1992
Prime Minister	Margaret Thatcher; John Major
Preceded by	John MacGregor
Succeeded by	John Patten (Education)
Secretary of State for Health
In office 25 July 1988 – 2 November 1990
Prime Minister	Margaret Thatcher
Preceded by	John Moore (Social Services)
Succeeded by	William Waldegrave
Chancellor of the Duchy of Lancaster
In office 13 July 1987 – 25 July 1988
Prime Minister	Margaret Thatcher
Preceded by	Norman Tebbit
Succeeded by	Tony Newton
Ministerial offices 1974–1987
Minister of State for Trade and Industry
In office 13 July 1987 – 25 July 1988
Prime Minister	Margaret Thatcher
Preceded by	Giles Shaw
Succeeded by	Eric Forth
Paymaster General
In office 2 September 1985 – 13 July 1987
Prime Minister	Margaret Thatcher
Preceded by	John Gummer
Succeeded by	Peter Brooke
Minister of State for Employment
In office 2 September 1985 – 13 July 1987
Prime Minister	Margaret Thatcher
Preceded by	Peter Morrison
Succeeded by	John Cope
Minister of State for Health
In office 5 March 1982 – 2 September 1985
Prime Minister	Margaret Thatcher
Preceded by	Gerard Vaughan
Succeeded by	Barney Hayhoe
Parliamentary Under-Secretary of State for Transport (Note: Parliamentary Secretary (1979–81))
In office 7 May 1979 – 5 March 1982
Prime Minister	Margaret Thatcher
Preceded by	John Horam
Succeeded by	Lynda Chalker
Lord Commissioner of the Treasury
In office 8 January 1974 – 4 March 1974
Prime Minister	Edward Heath
Preceded by	Hugh Rossi
Succeeded by	Donald Coleman
Shadow cabinet posts
Shadow Secretary of State for Business, Innovation and Skills
In office 19 January 2009 – 11 May 2010
Leader	David Cameron
Preceded by	Alan Duncan (Business, Enterprise and Regulatory Reform)
Succeeded by	Pat McFadden
Shadow Chancellor of the Exchequer
In office 2 May 1997 – 11 June 1997
Leader	John Major
Preceded by	Gordon Brown
Succeeded by	Peter Lilley
Parliamentary offices
Father of the House of Commons
In office 26 February 2017 – 6 November 2019
Speaker	John Bercow; Lindsay Hoyle
Preceded by	Gerald Kaufman
Succeeded by	Peter Bottomley
Member of the House of Lords
Lord Temporal
Life peerage 4 September 2020
Member of Parliament for Rushcliffe
In office 18 June 1970 – 6 November 2019
Preceded by	Antony Gardner
Succeeded by	Ruth Edwards

Personal details
- Born: Kenneth Harry Clarke; 2 July 1940 (age 86) Nottingham, England
- Party: Conservative (Note: The whip was suspended from him from 4 September 2019 until the dissolution of Parliament on 6 November 2019; he rejoined the Conservative parliamentary party as a peer on 4 September 2020.)
- Spouse: Gillian Edwards (m. 1964; died 2015)
- Children: 2
- Education: Nottingham High School; Gonville and Caius College, Cambridge (BA, LLB)

Kenneth Harry Clarke, Baron Clarke of Nottingham (born 2 July 1940), is a British politician who served in two of the Great Offices of State, as Home Secretary from 1992 to 1993 and Chancellor of the Exchequer from 1993 to 1997. A member of the Conservative Party, he was Member of Parliament (MP) for Rushcliffe from 1970 to 2019, serving as Father of the House of Commons between 2017 and 2019. Clarke served in the Cabinets of Margaret Thatcher and John Major as Chancellor of the Duchy of Lancaster from 1987 to 1988, Health Secretary from 1988 to 1990, and Education Secretary from 1990 to 1992.

President of the Tory Reform Group since 1997, Clarke is a one-nation conservative who identifies with economically and socially liberal views. He contested the Conservative Party leadership three times—in 1997, 2001 and 2005—being defeated each time. Opinion polls indicated he was more popular with the general public than with his party, whose generally Eurosceptic stance did not chime with his pro-European views. Under the coalition government of David Cameron, Clarke returned to the Cabinet as Justice Secretary and Lord Chancellor from 2010 to 2012 and Minister without Portfolio from 2012 to 2014. He was also the United Kingdom Anti-Corruption Champion from 2010 to 2014.

The Conservative Whip was withdrawn from him in September 2019 because he and 20 other MPs voted with the Opposition on a motion; for the remainder of his time in Parliament he sat as an independent, though still on the government benches. He stood down as an MP at the 2019 general election and was thereafter made a Conservative life peer in the House of Lords in 2020.

Clarke is a patron of the Conservative European Forum, co-president of the pro-EU body British Influence, and vice-president of the European Movement UK. Described by the press as a 'Big Beast' of British politics, his total time as a minister is the fifth-longest in the modern era. He has spent over 20 years serving under Prime Ministers Edward Heath, Margaret Thatcher, John Major and David Cameron. He was one of only five ministers (Tony Newton, Malcolm Rifkind, Patrick Mayhew and Lynda Chalker are the others) to serve throughout the whole 18 years of the Thatcher and Major governments, which represents the longest uninterrupted ministerial service in Britain since Lord Palmerston in the early 19th century.

== Early life and education ==
Kenneth Harry Clarke was born in Nottingham and was christened with the same name as his father, Kenneth Clarke, a mining electrician. The younger Clarke spent his early years in Langley Mill, Derbyshire. He won a scholarship to the independent Nottingham High School before going up to read law at Gonville and Caius College, Cambridge, where he graduated with an upper second honours degree. Clarke initially held Labour sympathies, and his grandfather was a Communist, but while at Cambridge he joined the Conservative Party.

As Chairman of the Cambridge University Conservative Association (CUCA), Clarke invited former British Fascist leader Sir Oswald Mosley to speak for two years in succession, prompting some Jewish students (including his future successor at the Home Office, Michael Howard) to resign from CUCA in protest. Howard then defeated Clarke in one election for the presidency of the Cambridge Union, but Clarke became President of the Cambridge Union a year later, being elected on 6 March 1963 by a majority of 56 votes. Clarke opposed the admission of women to the Union, and is quoted as saying upon his election, "The fact that Oxford has admitted them does not impress me at all. Cambridge should wait a year to see what happens before any decision is taken on admitting them."

In an early-1990s documentary, journalist Michael Cockerell played to Clarke some tape recordings of him speaking at the Cambridge Union as an undergraduate, and he displayed amusement at hearing his then-stereotypical upper class accent. Clarke is deemed one of the Cambridge Mafia, a group of prominent Conservative politicians who were educated at Cambridge in the early 1960s. After graduation, Clarke was called to the Bar in 1963 at Gray's Inn, being appointed Queen's Counsel in 1980.

== Parliamentary career ==
Clarke sought election to the House of Commons almost immediately after Cambridge. His political career began by contesting the Labour stronghold of Mansfield at the 1964 and 1966 elections. In June 1970, just before his 30th birthday, he won the East Midlands constituency of Rushcliffe in Nottinghamshire, south of Nottingham, from Labour MP Tony Gardner.

Clarke was soon appointed a Government Whip, and served as such from 1972 to 1974; he, with the assistance of Labour rebels, helped ensure Edward Heath's government won key votes on British entry into the European Communities (which later evolved into the European Union). Even though Clarke opposed the election of Margaret Thatcher as Conservative Party Leader in 1975, he was appointed as her Industry Spokesman from 1976 to 1979, and then occupied a range of ministerial positions during her premiership.

From 2017 to 2019, Clarke served as Father of the House. Following his expulsion from the Conservative Party in September 2019, he became the first Independent MP to hold the position of Father of the House since Clement Tudway, who died in office as MP for Wells in 1815.

Lord Clarke is the subject of a portrait in oil commissioned by Parliament.

=== Early ministerial positions ===
Clarke first served in the government of Margaret Thatcher as Parliamentary secretary for Transport (1979–81) and Parliamentary under-secretary of state for Transport (1981–82), and then Minister of State for Health (1982–85).

Clarke joined the Cabinet as Paymaster General and Employment Minister (1985–87) (his Secretary of State, Lord Young of Graffham, sat in the Lords), and served as Chancellor of the Duchy of Lancaster and Minister of the DTI (1987–88) with responsibility for Inner Cities. Whilst in that position, Clarke announced the sale to British Aerospace of the Rover Group, a new name for British Leyland, which had been nationalised in 1975 by the government of Harold Wilson.

=== Health Secretary (and aftermath) ===
Clarke was appointed the first Secretary of State for Health when the department was created out of the former Department of Health and Social Security in July 1988. Clarke, with backing from John Major, persuaded Thatcher to accept the controversial "internal market" concept to the NHS. Clarke claimed that he had persuaded Thatcher to introduce internal competition in the NHS as an alternative to her preference for introducing a system of compulsory health insurance, which he opposed.

He told his biographer Malcolm Balen: "John Moore was pursuing a line which Margaret [Thatcher] was very keen on, which made everything compulsory medical insurance. I was bitterly opposed to that...The American system is...the world's worst health service – expensive, inadequate and with a lot of rich doctors". In her memoirs, Thatcher claimed that Clarke, although "a firm believer in state provision", was "an extremely effective Health minister – tough in dealing with vested interests and trade unions, direct and persuasive in his exposition of government policy".

In January 1989, Clarke's White Paper Working for Patients appeared; this advocated giving hospitals the right to become self-governing NHS Trusts, taxpayer-funded but with control over their budgets and independent of the regional health authorities. It also proposed that doctors be given the option to become "GP fundholders". This would grant doctors control of their own budgets in the belief that they would purchase the most effective services for their patients. Instead of doctors automatically sending patients to the nearest hospital, they would be able to choose where they were treated. In this way, money would follow the patient and the most efficient hospitals would receive the greatest funding.

This was not well received by doctors and their trade union, the British Medical Association, launched a poster campaign against Clarke's reforms, claiming that the NHS was "underfunded, undermined and under threat". They also called the new GP contracts "Stalinist". A March 1990 opinion poll commissioned by the BMA showed that 73% believed that the NHS was not safe in Conservative hands. Clarke later claimed that the BMA was "the most unscrupulous trade union I have ever dealt with and I've dealt with every trade union across the board". Although Thatcher tried to halt the reforms just before they were introduced, Clarke successfully argued that they were necessary to demonstrate the government's commitment to the NHS. Thatcher told Clarke: "It is you I'm holding responsible if my NHS reforms don't work".

By 1994 almost all hospitals had opted to become trusts but GP fundholding was much less popular. There were allegations that fundholders received more funding than non-fundholders, creating a two-tier system. GP fundholding was abolished by Labour in 1997 and replaced by Primary Care Groups. According to John Campbell, by "the mid-1990s the NHS was treating more patients, more efficiently than in the 1980s...the system was arguably better managed and more accountable than before". Studies suggest that while the competition introduced in the "internal market" system resulted in shorter waiting times, it also caused a reduction in the quality of care for patients.

Clarke has been the subject of criticism over the decades for his responsibility for the contaminated blood scandal. It was the largest loss-of-life disaster in Britain since the 1950s and claimed the lives of thousands of haemophiliacs. Theresa May ordered a public inquiry into the contaminated blood scandal in July 2017. In July 2021, Clarke gave oral evidence to the inquiry with his demeanour being widely branded "arrogant, pompous and contemptuous" by the press. It was reported that he argued with inquiry counsel, refused to apologise and at one point even walked out while the chairman, Sir Brian Langstaff, was speaking.

The MSF trade union claimed that Clarke's exclusion of NHS medical laboratory staff from the pay review body in 1984 led to massive staff shortages and a crisis in medical laboratory testing by 1999.

=== Later ministerial positions ===
Just over two years later he was appointed Secretary of State for Education and Science in the final weeks of Thatcher's Government, following Norman Tebbit's unwillingness to return to Cabinet following the resignation of Geoffrey Howe. Clarke was the first Cabinet Minister to advise Thatcher to resign after her victory in the first round of the November 1990 leadership contest was less than the 15% winning margin required to prevent a second ballot; she referred to him in her memoirs as a candid friend: "his manner was robust in the brutalist style he has cultivated: the candid friend".

Clarke came to work with John Major very closely, and quickly emerged as a central figure in his government. After continuing as Education Secretary (1990–92), where he introduced a number of reforms, he was appointed as Home Secretary in the wake of the Conservatives' victory at the 1992 general election. In May 1993, seven months after the impact of "Black Wednesday" had damaged Norman Lamont's credibility as Chancellor of the Exchequer, Major sacked Lamont and appointed Clarke in his place.

=== Chancellor of the Exchequer ===
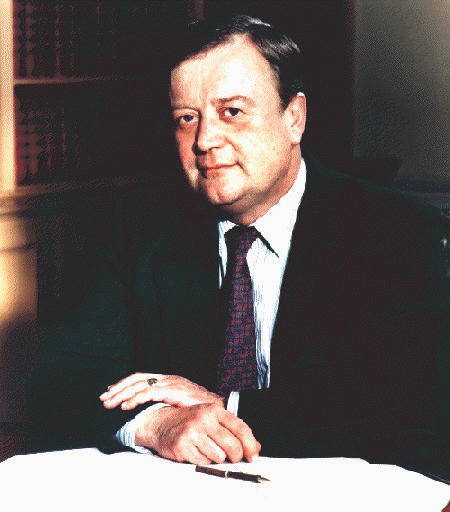
Clarke as Chancellor of the Exchequer

At first, Clarke was seen as the dominant figure in Cabinet, and at the October 1993 Conservative Party Conference he defended Major from his critics by pronouncing "any enemy of John Major is an enemy of mine."

In the party leadership contest of 1995, when John Major beat John Redwood, Clarke kept faith in Major and commented: "I don't think the Conservative Party could win an election in 1,000 years on this ultra right-wing programme".

Clarke enjoyed an increasingly successful record as Chancellor, as the economy recovered from the recession of the early 1990s and a new monetary policy was put into effect after Black Wednesday. He reduced the basic rate of income tax from 25% to 23%, reduced UK Government spending as a percentage of GDP, and reduced the budget deficit from £50.8 billion in 1993 to £15.5 billion in 1997. Clarke's successor, the Labour Chancellor Gordon Brown, continued these policies, which eliminated the deficit by 1998 and allowed Brown to record a budget surplus for the following four years. Interest rates, inflation and unemployment all fell during Clarke's tenure at HM Treasury. Clarke's success was such that Brown felt he had to pledge to keep to Clarke's spending plans and these limits remained in place for the first two years of the Labour Government that was elected in 1997.

=== Single Currency: free-hand and referendum pledge ===
The matter of a referendum on Britain joining the planned euro – first raised by Margaret Thatcher in 1990 – was, after much press speculation, raised again at Cabinet by Douglas Hogg in the spring of 1996, very likely (in Clarke's view) with Major's approval; Clarke records that Heseltine spoke "with passionate intensity" at Cabinet against a referendum, believing both that referendums were pernicious and that no concession would be enough to please the Eurosceptics. Clarke, who had already threatened resignation over the issue, also opposed the measure and, although Clarke and Heseltine were in a small minority in Cabinet, Major once again deferred a decision.

Major, Heseltine and Clarke eventually reached agreement in April 1996, in what Clarke describes as "a tense meeting ... rather like a treaty session", that there would be a commitment to a referendum before joining the euro, but that the pledge would be valid for one Parliament only (i.e. until the general election after next), with the Government's long-term options remaining completely open; Clarke threatened to resign if this formula were departed from.

Clarke, writing in 2016 after the Brexit Referendum, comments that he and Heseltine later agreed that they had separately decided to give way because of the pressure Major was under, and that the referendum pledge "was the biggest single mistake" of their careers, giving "legitimacy" to such a device.

In December 1996, after Foreign Secretary Malcolm Rifkind had commented that it was unlikely that the government would join the euro, Clarke and Heseltine took to the airwaves – in apparent unison – to insist that the government retained a free choice as to whether or not to join, angering Eurosceptics. When Tory Party Chairman, Brian Mawhinney, was understood to have briefed against him, Clarke declared: "tell your kids to get their scooters off my lawn" – an allusion to Harold Wilson's rebuke of Trades Union leader Hugh Scanlon in the late 1960s.

=== Role as a backbencher ===
After the Conservatives entered opposition in 1997, Clarke contested the leadership of the Party for the first time. In 1997, the electorate being solely Tory Members of Parliament, he topped the poll in the first and second rounds. In the third and final round he formed an alliance with Eurosceptic John Redwood, who would have become Shadow Chancellor and Clarke's deputy, were he to have won the contest. However, Thatcher endorsed Clarke's rival William Hague, who proceeded to win the election comfortably. The contest was criticised for not involving the rank-and-file members of the Party, where surveys showed Clarke to be more popular. Clarke rejected the offer from Hague of a Shadow Cabinet role, opting instead to return to the backbenches.

Clarke contested the party leadership for a second time in 2001. Despite opinion polls again showing he was the most popular Conservative politician with the British public, he lost in a final round among the rank-and-file membership, a new procedure introduced by Hague, to a much less experienced, but strongly Eurosceptic rival, Iain Duncan Smith. This loss, by a margin of 62% to 38%, was attributed to the former Chancellor's strong pro-European views being increasingly out-of-step with the party members' Euroscepticism. His campaign was managed by Andrew Tyrie.

Clarke opposed the 2003 invasion of Iraq. After choosing not to stand for the leadership after Duncan Smith departed in 2003 in the interests of party unity, he returned to fight the 2005 leadership election. He still retained huge popularity among voters, with 40% of the public believing he would be the best leader. He was accused by Norman Tebbit of being "lazy" whilst leadership rival Malcolm Rifkind suggested that Clarke's pro-European views could have divided the Conservative Party had Clarke won. In the event, Clarke was eliminated in the first round of voting by Conservative MPs. Eventual winner David Cameron appointed Clarke to head a Democracy Task Force as part of his extensive 18-month policy review in December 2005, exploring issues such as the reform of the House of Lords and party funding. Clarke is President of the Tory Reform Group, a liberal, pro-European ginger group within the Conservative Party.

Clarke became known as "an economic and social liberal, an internationalist and a strong supporter of the European idea".

In 2006, he described Cameron's plans for a British Bill of Rights as "xenophobic and legal nonsense".

=== Parliamentary expenses scandal ===
On 12 May 2009, The Daily Telegraph reported that Clarke had "flipped" his Council Tax. He had told the Parliamentary authorities that his main home was in the Rushcliffe constituency, enabling him to claim a second-home allowance on his London residence, leaving the taxpayer to foot the bill for Council Tax due on that property. However, he told Rushcliffe Borough Council in Nottinghamshire that he spent so little time at his constituency address that his wife Gillian should qualify for a 25% Council Tax (single person's) discount, saving the former Chancellor around £650 per year. Land Registry records showed that Clarke no longer had a mortgage on his Nottinghamshire home where he has lived since 1987. Instead he held a mortgage on his London property, which was being charged to the taxpayer at £480 per month.

=== Return to the frontbench ===
In 2009, Clarke became Shadow Business Secretary in Opposition to the then Business Secretary, Peter Mandelson. David Cameron flattered Clarke as about the only one able to challenge Mandelson and Brown's economic credibility. Two days later it emerged that Clarke had warned in a speech a month earlier that President Barack Obama could see David Cameron as a "right-wing nationalist" if the Conservatives maintained Eurosceptic policies and that Obama would "start looking at whoever is in Germany or France if we start being isolationist". The Financial Times said "Clarke has in effect agreed to disagree with the Tories' official Eurosceptic line".

=== Lord Chancellor and Justice Secretary ===
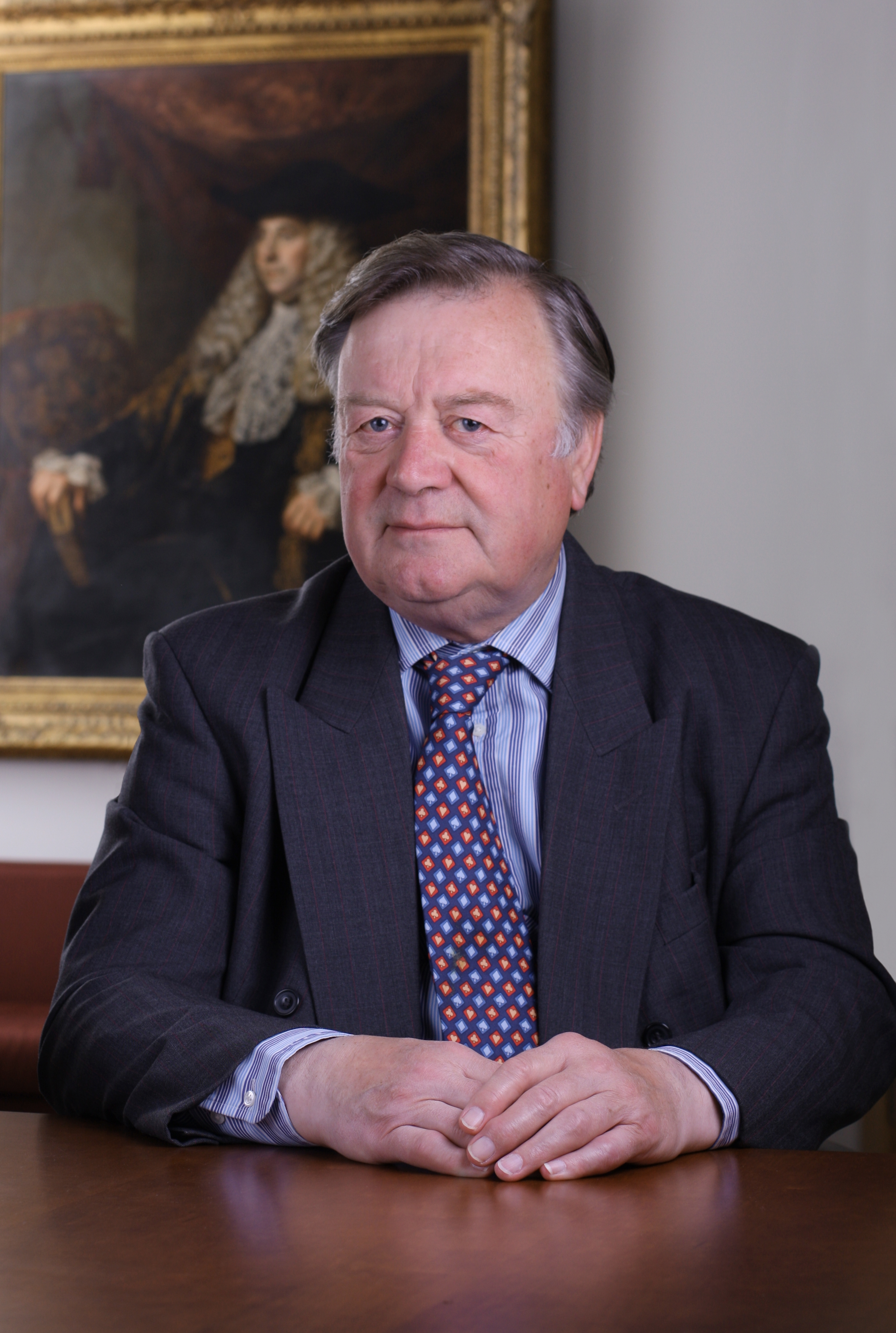
Clarke as Lord Chancellor, 2011

On 12 May 2010, Clarke's appointment as Secretary of State for Justice and Lord Chancellor was announced by Prime Minister David Cameron in the Coalition Government formed between the Conservative and Liberal Democrat parties. James Macintyre, political editor of Prospect, argued that in this ministerial role he had instigated a process of radical reform.

In June 2010, Clarke signalled an end to short prison sentences after warning it was "virtually impossible" to rehabilitate any inmate in less than 12 months. In his first major speech after taking office, he described the current prison population of 85,000 as "astonishing" and said that prison was not effective in many cases. He indicated a major shift in penal policy that could result in more offenders being handed community sentences, and received immediate criticism from some colleagues in a party renowned for its tough stance on law and order. He signalled that fathers who fail to pay child maintenance, disqualified drivers and criminals fighting asylum refusals could be among the first to benefit and should not be sent to prison.

Clarke announced in February 2011 that the Government intended to scrutinise the relationship between the European Court of Human Rights and national parliaments.

In May 2011, controversy related to Clarke's reported views on sentencing for those convicted of rape resurfaced after an interview on the radio station BBC Radio 5 Live, in which he discussed a proposal to increase the reduction of sentences for those criminals (including rapists) who pleaded guilty pre-trial, from a third to a half. In the interview he incorrectly asserted that the reason for the low average sentence of those convicted of rape was that legal definition of "rape" in England and Wales included such less serious offences as consensual sex between a 17 year old and a 15 year old.

In 2011 and 2012, Clarke faced criticism for his Justice and Security Bill, in particular those aspects of it that allow secret trials when "national security" is at stake. The Economist stated: "the origins of the proposed legislation lie in civil cases brought by former Guantánamo detainees, the best-known of whom was Binyam Mohamed, alleging that government intelligence and security agencies (MI6 and MI5) were complicit in their rendition and torture". Prominent civil liberties and human rights campaigners argued: "the worst excesses of the war on terror have been revealed by open courts and a free media. Yet the Justice and Security Green Paper seeks to place Government above the law and would undermine such crucial scrutiny."

=== Minister without Portfolio ===
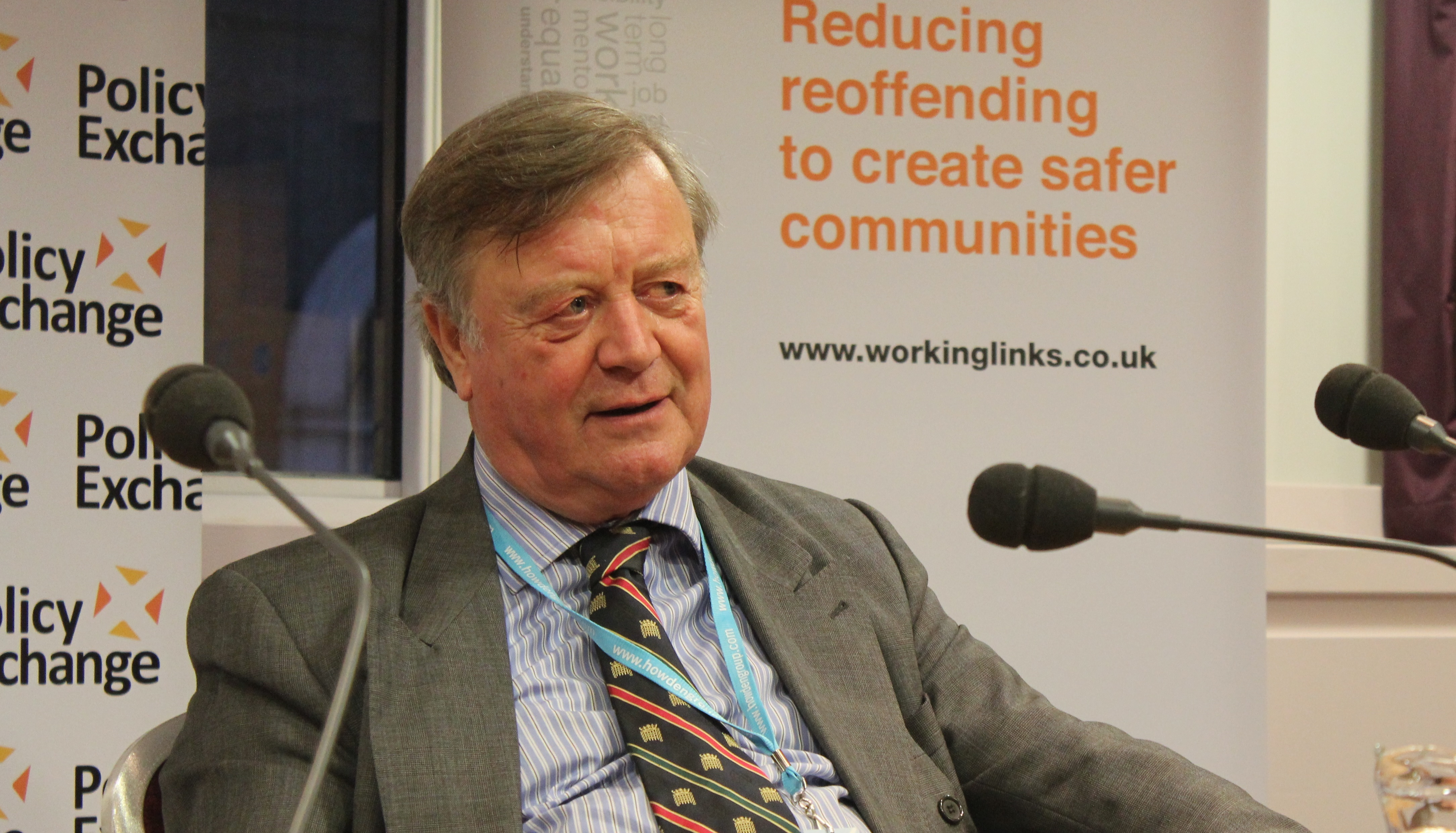
Rt Hon. Kenneth Clarke MP in 2012

In the 2012 Cabinet reshuffle, Clarke was moved from Justice Secretary to Minister without Portfolio. It was also announced that he would assume the role of roving Trade Envoy with responsibility for promoting British business and trade interests abroad, a position which he enjoyed.

In the 2014 Cabinet reshuffle, after more than 20 years serving as a Minister, it was announced that Clarke had stepped down from government, to return to the backbenches. Clarke was honoured as a Companion of Honour, upon the Prime Minister's recommendation, in July 2014. His total time as a government minister is the fifth-longest in the modern era after Winston Churchill, Arthur Balfour, Rab Butler, and the Duke of Devonshire.

=== Return to the backbenches ===
Clarke was opposed to Brexit during the 2016 referendum on the United Kingdom's continued membership of the European Union, and opposed the holding of the referendum in the first place. He was the sole Conservative MP to vote against the triggering of Article 50.

During the 2016 Conservative leadership election, Clarke was interviewed by Sky News on 5 July 2016 and made negative comments to Sir Malcolm Rifkind, about the "fiasco" (leadership contest) and about three of the candidates. In a widely circulated video clip, he referred to Theresa May as a "bloody difficult woman", joked that Michael Gove, who was "wild", would "go to war with at least three countries at once" and characterised some of the utterances of Andrea Leadsom as "extremely stupid". Clarke added that Gove "did us all a favour by getting rid of Boris. The idea of Boris as prime minister is ridiculous."

In February 2017, following the death of Gerald Kaufman, Clarke succeeded as Father of the House, continuing after his re-election as an MP at the 2017 general election.

In December 2017, Clarke voted along with fellow Conservative Dominic Grieve and nine other Conservative MPs against the government, and in favour of guaranteeing Parliament a "meaningful vote" on any Brexit deal Britain agrees with the European Union.

Clarke endorsed Rory Stewart during the 2019 Conservative leadership election.

In September 2019, after Conservative Prime Minister Boris Johnson lost a number of key votes in the House of Commons, Clarke stated that it would be "not inconceivable" for him to become Prime Minister leading a government of national unity in order to revoke Article 50 and prevent Brexit. Other politicians who were suggested for such a role at the time included Harriet Harman, his female counterpart as Mother of the House of Commons. Lib Dem leader Jo Swinson supported the proposal, though Boris Johnson and Jeremy Corbyn, the Leader of the Opposition, both dismissed the suggestion. As it turned out, a vote of no-confidence was not in fact tabled against Boris Johnson's government and no such government of national unity was formed or took office.

=== Sitting as an independent ===
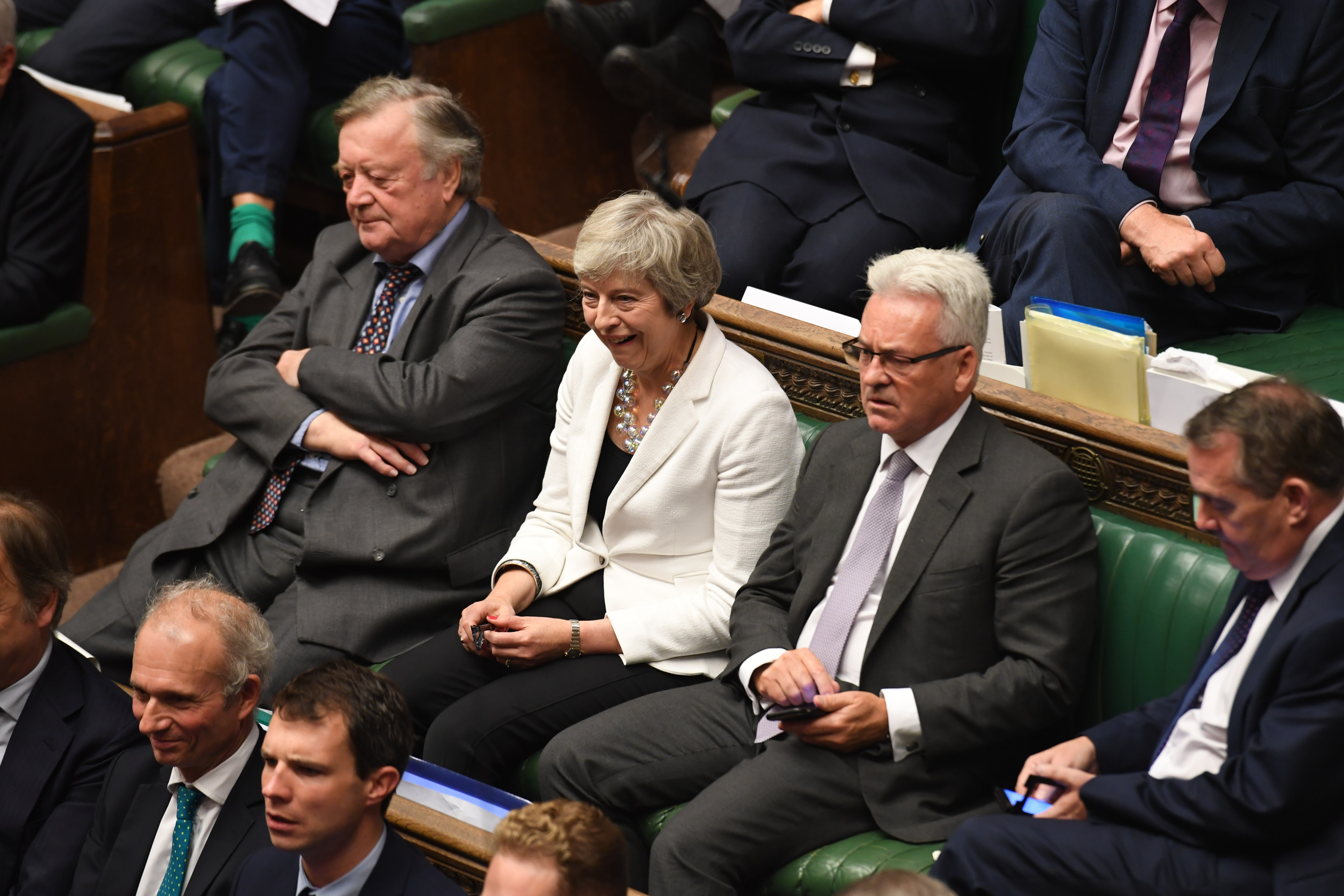
Clarke sitting on the backbenches alongside Theresa May, Sir Alan Duncan and Liam Fox, 19 October 2019

On 3 September 2019, Clarke joined 20 other rebel Conservative MPs to vote against the Conservative government of Boris Johnson. The rebel MPs voted against a Conservative motion which subsequently failed. Effectively, they helped block Johnson's no-deal Brexit plan from proceeding on 31 October. Subsequently, all 21 were advised that they had lost the Conservative whip and were expelled as Conservative MPs, requiring them to sit as independents. If they decided to run for re-election in a future election, the party would block their selection as Conservative candidates, though Clarke opted not to do so.

On the edition of 3 September of BBC's Newsnight, Clarke discussed the situation, saying that he no longer recognised the Conservative Party, referring to it as "the Brexit Party, rebadged". His rationale was "It's been taken over by a rather knockabout sort of character, who's got this bizarre crash-it-through philosophy... a Cabinet which is the most right-wing Cabinet any Conservative Party has ever produced." In an interview on 7 September, Clarke rejected the suggestion that, like other former Conservative MPs, he could join the Liberal Democrats, but noted that, if he were to cast "a protest vote", he would "follow the Conservative tradition of voting Lib Dem."

In his capacity as Father of the House, Clarke presided over the House of Commons' 2019 Speakership election. He then retired from the House of Commons at the 2019 general election. Given that Dennis Skinner too left the House (having lost his seat in the election) at that time, Peter Bottomley succeeded as Father of the House.

=== House of Lords ===
Nominated in early 2020 for elevation to the peerage by Boris Johnson, on 4 September he was created Baron Clarke of Nottingham, of West Bridgford in the County of Nottinghamshire. Taking the Conservative Whip, Lord Clarke made his maiden speech on 28 September 2020.

== Corporate, media and other work ==
Whilst serving as a backbench MP and as a Shadow Cabinet Minister, Clarke accepted several non-executive directorships:

- Deputy Chairman and a director of British American Tobacco (BAT) (1998–2007), for which Clarke faced allegations relating to activities of BAT in lobbying the developing world to reject stronger health warnings on cigarette packets.
- Chairman (non-executive) of Unichem
- Director of Foreign & Colonial Investment Trust
- Member from June 2007 of the Advisory Board of Centaurus Capital, a London-based hedge fund management company.
- Clarke is a member of the advisory board of Agcapita Farmland Investment Partnership, a Canadian farmland investment fund.
- Director (non-executive) of Independent News and Media (UK).
- Participant at the annual meeting of the Bilderberg Group in 1993, 1998–2000, 2003–04, 2006–08 and 2012–13.

Also as a backbencher, Clarke declared engagement in non-political media work:

- presented several series of jazz programmes on BBC Radio Four, including one on his namesake, bebop drummer Kenny Clarke
- wrote a monthly column for Financial Mail on Sunday (£10,001–15,000)
- wrote a weekly commentary or interview for Bloomberg Television (£10,001–15,000)
- undertook occasional lecturing, on a self-employed basis.

== Personal life ==
In 1964, Clarke married Gillian Edwards, a Cambridge contemporary; they had a son and a daughter. She died of cancer in July 2015.

Clarke's enthusiasm for cigars, jazz and motor racing is well known, and he enjoys birdwatching as well as reading political history. He is also popularly recognised for his affection for suede Hush Puppies, a brand of shoe, which became a "trademark" of his during his early ministerial days. His autobiography denies he wore Hush Puppies and says these suede shoes were hand-made by Crockett & Jones.

Clarke is a sports enthusiast, being a supporter of both local football clubs Notts County and Nottingham Forest, who offered him a chair, and a former President of Nottinghamshire County Cricket Club. He is President of both Radcliffe Olympic and the Radcliffe on Trent Male Voice Choir, and a keen follower of Formula One motorsport. He was involved with tobacco giant British American Tobacco's Formula One team British American Racing (BAR) and has attended Grands Prix in support of the BAR team. BAR was sold to Honda in 2005. He also appeared on the podium of the 2012 British Grand Prix to present the first-place trophy to Mark Webber.

Clarke attended the 1966 FIFA World Cup Final and jokingly claims to have been influential in persuading the linesman, Tofiq Bahramov, to award a goal to Geoff Hurst when the England striker had seen his shot hit the crossbar of opponents West Germany, leaving doubt as to whether the ball had crossed the line. Clarke's position in the Wembley crowd was right behind the linesman at the time and he shouted at the official to award a goal.

Lord Clarke is a lover of real ale and has been an active member of the Campaign for Real Ale (CAMRA).

His memoir, Kind of Blue, was published in October 2016.

== Honours and awards ==
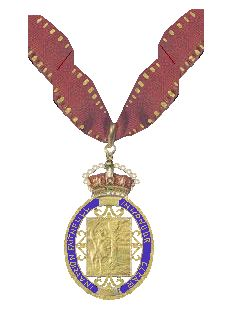
CH insignia

- UK Baron, cr. 2020
- Companion of Honour (CH), 2014
- Privy Counsellor (PC), 1985
- Queen's Counsel (now KC), 1980
  - Honorary Bencher of Gray's Inn, 1989; elected Full Bencher, 1997
  - Honorary doctorate of Laws (Hon. LLD), Nottingham, 1989
  - Honorary doctorate of Laws (Hon. LLD), Huddersfield, 1993
  - Honorary doctorate of the University (Hon. DUniv), Nottingham Trent, 1996
  - Honorary doctorate of the University (Hon. DUniv), Derby, 2017
  - Honorary Fellowship of Gonville and Caius College, Cambridge, 2013
  - Honorary Fellowship of the Chartered Institute of Taxation (Hon. FTI), 2016.

== Sources ==
- Kenneth Clarke, Kind of Blue, Macmillan, 2016, ISBN 1-509-83719-1
- Michael Crick, Michael Heseltine: A Biography, Hamish Hamilton, 1997, ISBN 0-241-13691-1

Parliament of the United Kingdom
Preceded by Antony Gardner	Member of Parliament for Rushcliffe; 1970–2019	Succeeded by Ruth Edwards
Political offices
Preceded by John Gummer	Paymaster General; 1985–1987	Succeeded by Peter Brooke
Preceded by Norman Tebbit	Chancellor of the Duchy of Lancaster; 1987–1988	Succeeded by Tony Newton
Preceded by John Moore	Secretary of State for Health; 1988–1990	Succeeded by William Waldegrave
Preceded by John MacGregor	Secretary of State for Education and Science; 1990–1992	Succeeded by John Patten
Preceded by Kenneth Baker	Home Secretary; 1992–1993	Succeeded by Michael Howard
Preceded by Norman Lamont	Chancellor of the Exchequer; 1993–1997	Succeeded by Gordon Brown
Preceded by Norman Lamont	Second Lord of the Treasury; 1993–1997	Succeeded by Gordon Brown
Preceded by Gordon Brown	Shadow Chancellor of the Exchequer; 1997	Succeeded by Peter Lilley
Preceded by Alan Duncan as Shadow Secretary of State for Business, Enterprise and Regulatory Reform	Shadow Secretary of State for Business, Innovation and Skills; 2009–2010	Succeeded by Peter Mandelson
Preceded by Jack Straw	Secretary of State for Justice; 2010–2012	Succeeded by Chris Grayling
Preceded by Jack Straw	Lord Chancellor; 2010–2012	Succeeded by Chris Grayling
Honorary titles
Preceded by Gerald Kaufman	Father of the House of Commons; 2017–2019	Succeeded by Peter Bottomley
Orders of precedence in the United Kingdom
Preceded by The Lord Walney	Gentlemen; Baron Clarke of Nottingham	Followed by The Lord Sarfraz
