= Nicholas Redmayne =

English stockbroker

The Hon. Sir Nicholas Redmayne Bt
- Born: February 1, 1938; United Kingdom
- Died: October 18, 2008 (aged 70); London, United Kingdom
- Education: Radley College and Royal Military Academy Sandhurst
- Occupation: Stockbroker
- Known for: A director of Kleinwort Benson
- Spouse(s): Ann Saunders (m. 1963–1976), Christine Diane Wood Fazakerley (m. 1978)
- Children: 2, Camilla Jane and Giles Martin
- Parent(s): Martin Redmayne and Anne Griffiths
- Military career
- Allegiance: United Kingdom
- Branch: British Army
- Service years: 1958–1962
- Rank: Officer
- Unit: Grenadier Guards

The Hon. Sir Nicholas John Redmayne, 2nd Baronet (1 February 1938 – 18 October 2008), was an English stockbroker and investment banker, who became a director of Kleinwort Benson.

In his early life he was a Grenadier Guards officer.

== Early life ==
He was the son of Martin Redmayne and his wife Anne Griffiths. His father was a Conservative politician who became Parliamentary Secretary to the Treasury.

The young Redmayne was educated at Radley College in Oxfordshire and at the Royal Military Academy Sandhurst. He was then commissioned into the Grenadier Guards, serving from 1958 to 1962.

== Career ==
In 1963, Redmayne entered the London Stock Exchange and between then and 1996 was with Grieveson Grant and Kleinwort Benson. In the 1980s he played a large part in developing Kleinwort Benson as a leading investment bank. By the early 1990s he was a director and Joint Head of Equity Securities. In 1994, Redmayne and D. C. Clementi were appointed as Joint Chief Executives of Investment Banking. In 1995, his last appointment was as chairman of KBIM, while continuing as joint chief executive.

In 1964, Redmayne's father was created the first Redmayne baronet of Rushcliffe, Nottinghamshire. On the death of his father in 1983, he succeeded as the second baronet.

== Personal life ==
On 7 September 1963, at Stratford-on-Avon, Redmayne married Ann Saunders, a daughter of Frank Saunders. Before divorcing in 1976, they had two children: Camilla Jane (1966) and Giles Martin (1968), later 3rd baronet. On 25 May 1978, Redmayne married secondly Christine Diane Wood Fazakerley, daughter of Thomas Wood Fazakerley.

In 1968, Redmayne was living at 39 Hans Place, Knightsbridge, and was a member of the Carlton Club. In 2003 he was living at Walcote Lodge, Walcote, Leicestershire.

== Notes ==
Baronetage of the United Kingdom
Preceded by Martin Redmayne	Baronet (of Rushcliffe); 1983–2008	Succeeded by Giles Martin Redmayne
