= Martin Redmayne, Baron Redmayne =

British Conservative politician

The Right Honourable The Lord Redmayne DSO TD PC

Government Chief Whip in the House of Commons Parliamentary Secretary to the Treasury
- In office 14 October 1959 – 16 October 1964
- Prime Minister: Harold Macmillan; Alec Douglas-Home
- Preceded by: Edward Heath
- Succeeded by: Edward Short
Shadow Cabinet posts
Shadow Minister of Transport
In office 4 August 1965 – 19 April 1966
Leader	Edward Heath
Preceded by	Enoch Powell
Succeeded by	Peter Walker
Shadow Minister of Agriculture, Fisheries and Food
In office 16 February 1965 – 4 August 1965
Leader	Alec Douglas-Home
Preceded by	Christopher Soames
Succeeded by	Joseph Godber
Shadow Postmaster General
In office 27 November 1964 – 16 February 1965
Leader	Alec Douglas-Home
Preceded by	Mervyn Pike
Succeeded by	David Gibson-Watt
Opposition Chief Whip of the House of Commons
In office 16 October 1964 – 27 November 1964
Leader	Alec Douglas-Home
Preceded by	Herbert Bowden
Succeeded by	William Whitelaw
Junior ministerial offices
Government Deputy Chief Whip in the House of Commons
In office 25 January 1956 – 14 October 1959
Prime Minister	Anthony Eden; Harold Macmillan
Preceded by	Edward Heath
Succeeded by	Peter Legh
Lord Commissioner of the Treasury
In office 4 July 1953 – 14 October 1959
Prime Minister	Anthony Eden; Harold Macmillan
Preceded by	Herbert Butcher
Succeeded by	David Gibson-Watt

Member of Parliament for Rushcliffe
- In office 23 February 1950 – 10 March 1966
- Preceded by: Florence Paton
- Succeeded by: Antony Gardner

Personal details
- Born: 16 November 1910 Nottingham, England
- Died: 28 April 1983 (aged 72) London, England
- Party: Conservative
- Spouse: Ann Griffiths (m. 1932)
- Children: Nicholas

Martin Redmayne, Baron Redmayne, DSO, TD, PC (16 November 1910 – 28 April 1983) was a British Conservative politician.

== Background ==
Redmayne was born in Nottingham, the second son of civil engineer and farmer, Leonard Redmayne and his wife Mildred. He was educated at Radley College. He served in World War II, commanding the 14th Battalion of the Sherwood Foresters (Nottinghamshire and Derbyshire Regiment) in Italy in 1943 and the 66th Infantry Brigade from 1944 to 1945. He was awarded the DSO in February 1945, Mentioned in Despatches on 11 January 1945 and made an Honorary Brigadier in 1945.

== Political career ==
In 1950, Redmayne entered the Commons as Conservative MP for Rushcliffe. He was a Government Whip a year later, a Lord Commissioner of the Treasury from 1953 to 1959, Deputy Chief Whip from 1955 to 1959 and Parliamentary Secretary to the Treasury and Government Chief Whip from 1959 to 1964. He was the Chief Whip during the Profumo affair. Admitted to the Privy Council in 1959, he was made a baronet on 29 December 1964 and after leaving the Commons, was created a life peer as Baron Redmayne, of Rushcliffe in the County of Nottinghamshire on 10 June 1966.

== Personal life and death ==
In 1932, Redmayne married Ann Griffiths, and they had a son, Nicholas. Lord Redmayne died at King Edward VII's Hospital in London on 28 April 1983, aged 72, and Nicholas inherited the baronetcy.

== Coat of arms ==
Coat of arms of Martin Redmayne, Baron Redmayne

Crest
In front of a cushion as in the arms fesswise a horse's head Argent maned Gules.
Escutcheon
Gules two chevronels between three cushions Ermine tasseled Or a bordure engrailed Argent.
Supporters
Dexter a Herdwick ram Proper poll Gules, sinister a lion Or maned Gules.
Motto
Without Blood No Victory

== Sources ==
- Burke's Peerage & Gentry

Parliament of the United Kingdom
Preceded by Florence Paton	Member of Parliament for Rushcliffe; 1950–1966	Succeeded by Antony Gardner
Government offices
Preceded by Edward Heath	Government Deputy Chief Whip in the House of Commons; 1956–1959	Succeeded by Peter Legh
Preceded by Edward Heath	Government Chief Whip in the House of Commons; Parliamentary Secretary to the Treasury; 1959–1964	Succeeded by Edward Short
Political offices
Preceded by Christopher Soames	Shadow Minister of Agriculture, Fisheries and Food; 1965	Succeeded by Joseph Godber
Preceded by Enoch Powell	Shadow Minister of Transport; 1965–1966	Succeeded by Peter Walker
Party political offices
Preceded by Edward Heath	Conservative Deputy Chief Whip in the House of Commons; 1956–1959	Succeeded by Peter Legh
Preceded by Edward Heath	Chief Whip of the Conservative Party; 1959–1964	Succeeded by William Whitelaw
Baronetage of the United Kingdom
New creation	Baronet (of Rushcliffe); 1964–1983	Succeeded by Nicholas Redmayne
