= Kind of Blue (book) =

Book by Kenneth Clarke

- First edition cover
- Author: Kenneth Clarke
- Language: English
- Genre: Memoir
- Published: 6 October 2016
- Publisher: Macmillan Publishers
- Publication place: United Kingdom
- Pages: 525
- ISBN: 9781509837199

Kind of Blue: A Political Memoir is a memoir by British Conservative politician Kenneth Clarke. The book was published on 6 October 2016 by Macmillan Publishers. It accounts for Clarke's forty-six years as the MP for Rushcliffe and the various Cabinets he served during that time, under various Prime Ministers. The book received mostly negative reviews from critics.

== Background ==
Clarke was a member of the Conservative Party who served under multiple Prime Ministers including Margaret Thatcher, John Major and David Cameron. He was considered a "political maverick" who opposed the more right leaning members of his party. In 2014, Clarke stepped down from his role as Minister without portfolio.

The book was named after the album Kind of Blue by jazz musician Miles Davis. Clarke recorded the book using a dictaphone which was later editorialized by others.

== Release ==
Kind of Blue was released on 6 October 2016 by Macmillan Publishers. Macmillan paid £430,000 for the publishing rights to the book. With the exception of those written by Prime Ministers, 430,000 was the highest amount for a book by a British politician.

== Reception ==
John Kampfner, writing for The Observer, felt that the book was "captivating" and compared the experience to listing to an audiobook. Writing for The Guardian described the book as "boring" and "shallow" noting that the epilogue felt rushed and acted on. Writing for The Times, John Preston felt the book was repetitive and generic.

The decision to use dictation was met with negative reception, with some critics finding it disappointing.
