= Antony Gardner =

British politician

Member of Parliament for Rushcliffe
- In office 31 March 1966 – 29 May 1970
- Preceded by: Martin Redmayne
- Succeeded by: Kenneth Clarke

Personal details
- Born: 27 December 1927
- Died: 16 October 2011 (aged 83)
- Party: Labour
- Spouse: Eveline Burden (m. 1956; died 2003)

Antony (Tony) John Gardner (27 December 1927 – 16 October 2011) was a British Labour Party politician. He sat in the House of Commons from 1966 to 1970.

A son of a gardener who worked in Dorset, Gardner was educated at an elementary school and then at Co-operative College and the University of Southampton.

He worked in the engineering industry, then did national service, after which he worked in the building trade until 1953. He was President of the Southampton University Union from 1958 to 1959, and worked as an education officer for the Co-operative Union from 1959 to 1966.

He unsuccessfully contested Wolverhampton South West at the 1964 general election, and was elected at the 1966 general election as the Member of Parliament (MP) for Rushcliffe. He was defeated at the 1970 general election by Kenneth Clarke of the Conservative Party. After his defeat, he became the principal information officer of the Central Council for Education and Training in Social Work.

At the February 1974 and October 1974 general elections, Gardner stood unsuccessfully in the Beeston constituency.

He moved to the south coast and at the 1994 European Parliament election stood for Labour in Dorset and East Devon. He died on 16 October 2011.

Parliament of the United Kingdom
Preceded by Martin Redmayne	Member of Parliament for Rushcliffe; 1966–1970	Succeeded by Ken Clarke
