= Henry Betterton, 1st Baron Rushcliffe =

British politician

The Right Honourable The Lord Rushcliffe GBE PC
- by Walter Stoneman, 1930

Minister of Labour
- In office 25 August 1931 – 29 June 1934
- Monarch: George V
- Prime Minister: Ramsay MacDonald
- Preceded by: Margaret Bondfield
- Succeeded by: Hon. Oliver Stanley

Personal details
- Born: 15 August 1872
- Died: 18 November 1949 (aged 77)
- Party: Conservative
- Spouse(s): (1) Violet Gilliat (d. 1947) (2) Inez Lubbock (d. 1955)
- Education: Christ Church, Oxford

Henry Bucknall Betterton, 1st Baron Rushcliffe (15 August 1872 – 18 November 1949), known as Sir Henry Betterton, Bt between 1929 and 1935, was a British barrister and Conservative politician. He served as Minister of Labour under Ramsay MacDonald between 1931 and 1934.

== Background and education ==
Betterton was the son of Henry Inman Betterton, of Woodville, Leicestershire, and Agnes, daughter of Samuel Bucknall. He was educated at Rugby and Christ Church, Oxford, and was called to the Bar, Inner Temple, in 1896. He practiced for some years at the Chancery Bar.

== Political career ==
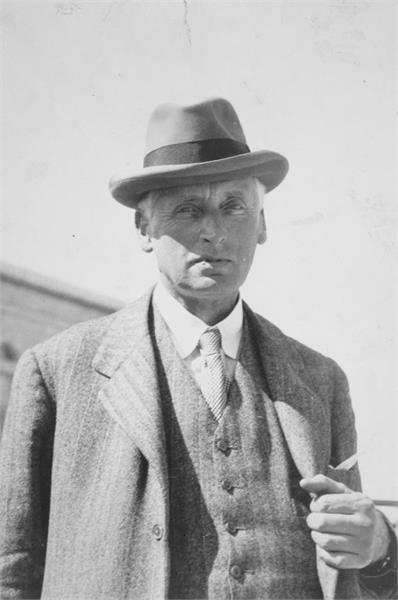
Henry Betterton 1929

Betterton was elected Member of Parliament for Rushcliffe in Nottingham in 1918. He served under Stanley Baldwin as Parliamentary Secretary to the Ministry of Labour between 1923 and 1924 and again between 1924 and 1929. When the National Government was formed in 1931 he was sworn of the Privy Council and made Minister of Labour under Ramsay MacDonald, a post he held until 1934, when he left the House of Commons after appointment as the chair of the Unemployment Assistance Board.

Betterton was appointed an Officer of the Order of the British Empire (OBE) in 1918 and a Commander of the Order of the British Empire (CBE) in 1920. He was made a Baronet, of Blackfordby in the County of Leicester, in 1929 and raised to the peerage as Baron Rushcliffe, of Blackfordby in the County of Leicester, in 1935. In 1941 he was appointed a Knight Grand Cross of the Order of the British Empire.

== Nurses Salaries Committee ==
Rushcliffe, as he was now known, chaired the Nurses Salaries Committee which was established in October 1941. It was the first official body to fix salary scales and conditions for nursing in England.

The Committee consisted of two panels, each of twenty members, one panel representing employers, the other employees. The committee published two reports in 1943.

== Family ==
Lord Rushcliffe was twice married. He married firstly Violet, daughter of J. G. Gilliat, in 1912. They had two daughters. After her death in October 1947 he married secondly Inez Alfreda, daughter of Alfred Lubbock and widow of Sir Harold Edward Snagge, in 1948. Rushcliffe died in November 1949, aged 77, when the baronetcy and barony became extinct. His second wife died in May 1955.

== Arms ==
Coat of arms of Henry Betterton, 1st Baron Rushcliffe
Notes Granted livery badge: A cinquefoil slipped ermine between two ears of wheat in saltire proper enfiled by a circlet Or. Crest Between the attires of a stag Or a pheon Sable. Escutcheon Argent three pheons Sable on a chief Gules a portcullis chained Or between two cinquefoils ermine. Motto Constantia Et Labore

== See also ==
- Report of the Commission on the Palestine Disturbances of August, 1929, Cmd. 3530

Parliament of the United Kingdom
Preceded by Leif Jones	Member of Parliament for Rushcliffe; 1918 – 1934	Succeeded by Ralph Assheton
Political offices
Preceded by Archibald Boyd-Carpenter	Parliamentary Secretary to the Ministry of Labour; 1923–1924	Succeeded by Margaret Bondfield
Preceded by Margaret Bondfield	Parliamentary Secretary to the Ministry of Labour; 1924–1929	Succeeded by Jack Lawson
Preceded by Margaret Bondfield	Minister of Labour; 1931–1934	Succeeded by Hon. Oliver Stanley
Baronetage of the United Kingdom
New creation	Baronet (of Blackfordby); 1929–1949	Extinct
Peerage of the United Kingdom
New creation	Baron Rushcliffe; 1935–1949	Extinct
