= Monte Ceceri =

Mountain in Italy

Coordinates: 43°48′03″N 11°18′25″E

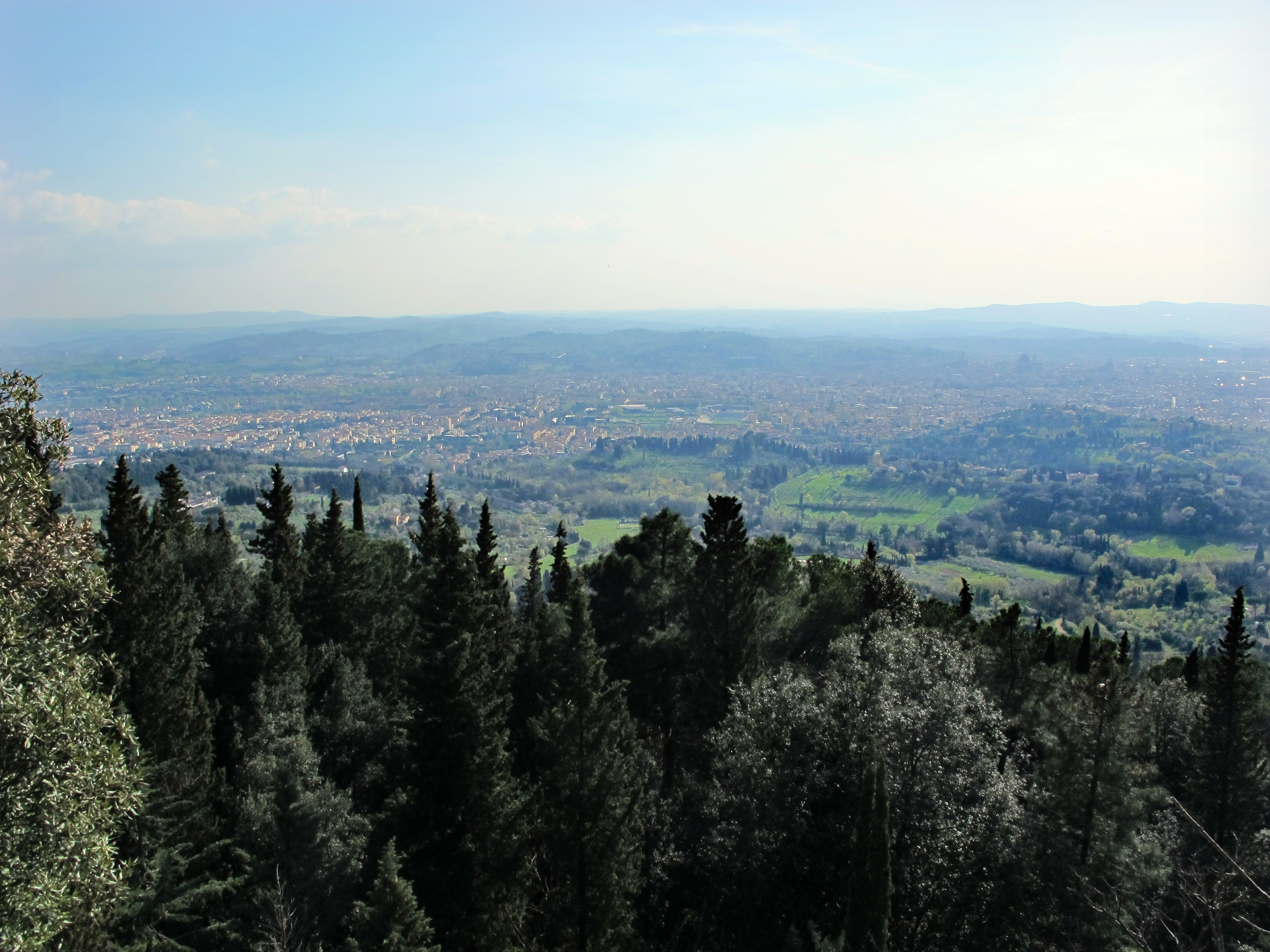
View of Florence from Monte Ceceri

Monte Ceceri is a hill near Fiesole, Tuscany. It is part of a 44-hectare (110-acre) nature reserve to the northeast of the city of Florence, within the Metropolitan City of Florence.

== History ==
Monte Ceceri was named for the swans that would once frequent the area, whose outgrowth on the beak, to the local Florentines, looked like chickpeas (the word for which is ceceri in Florentine dialect, and ceci in Italian). Since antiquity, the hill was quarried for construction of settlements in Florence and Fiesole. The ruins of some of the miners' huts are still present today along with several surviving necropoleis.

From the top of the hill, one can have a panoramic view of the city of Florence and the surrounding hills of the Arno Valley. The hill is currently part of a park called the Protected Natural Area of Local Interest Montececeri, or simply Montececeri Park.

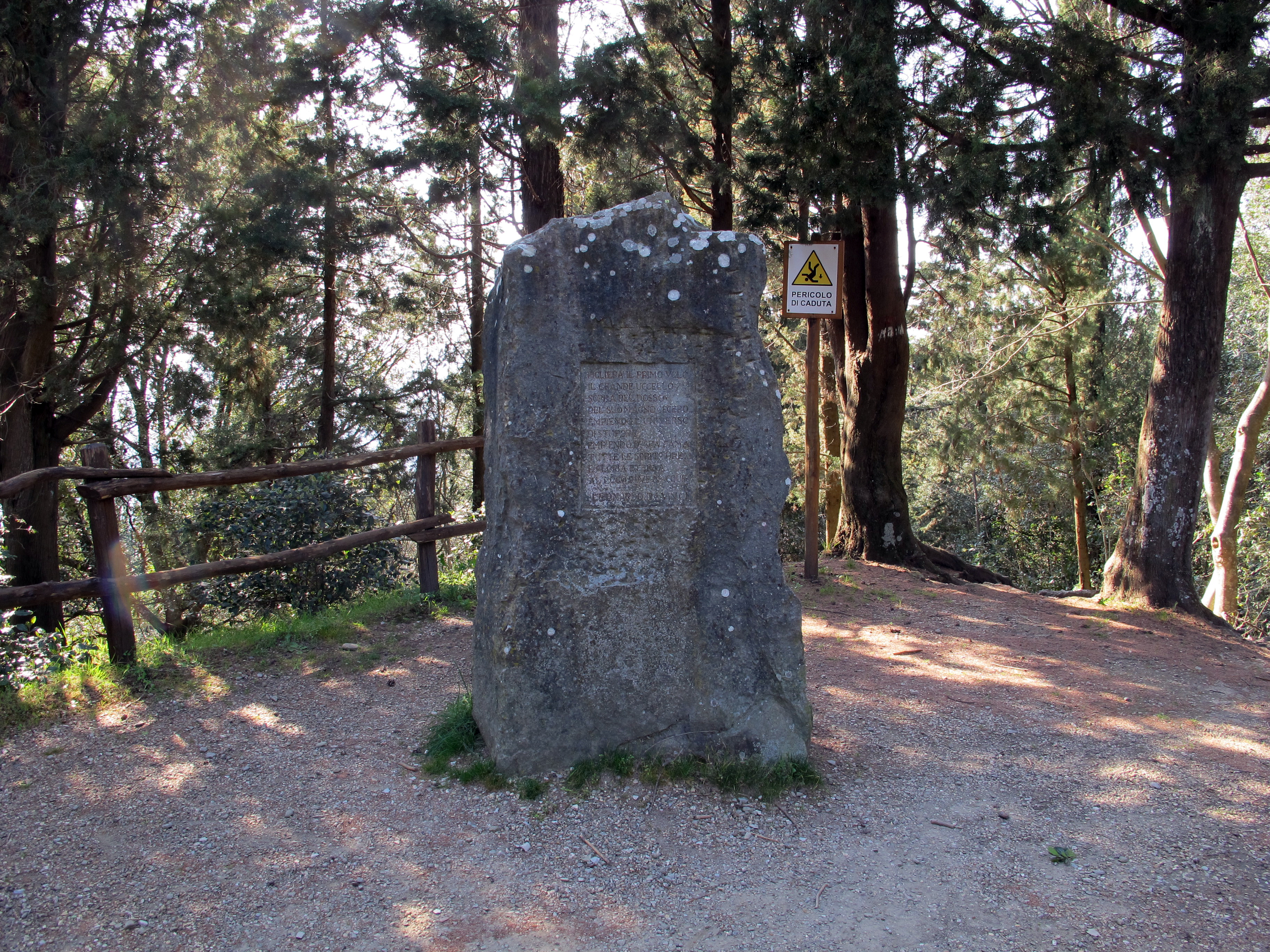
Memorial stone on Monte Ceceri commemorating da Vinci's flight experiment

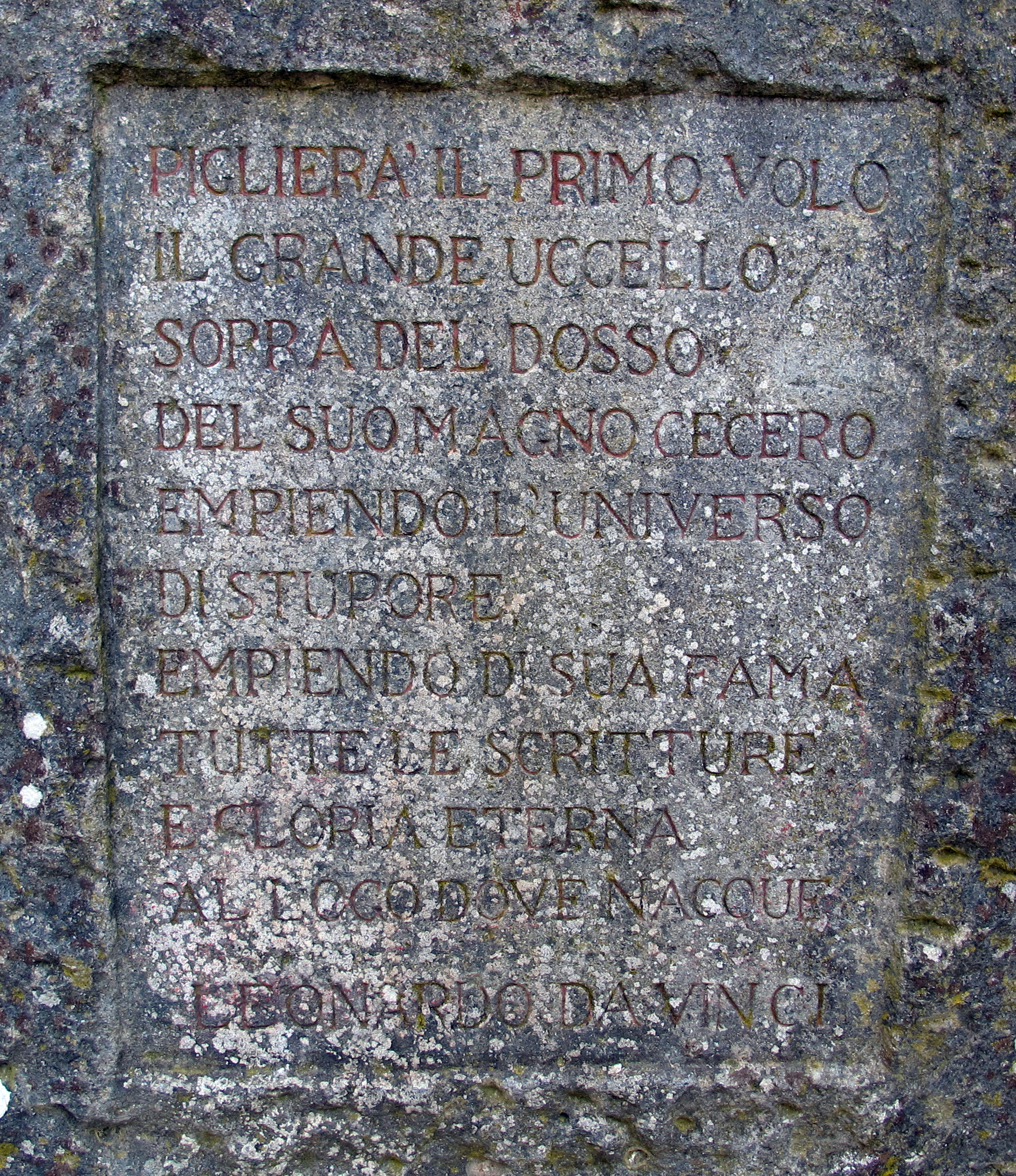
Closeup of memorial inscription

In the highest part of the park, a stele shows a famous phrase with which Leonardo da Vinci celebrates the grandeur of the idea of flight.

The hill is today of archeological interest due to its quarry caves and ruins and is also visited by tourists.

== The alleged flight of Leonardo da Vinci's machine ==
Mount Ceceri is the location where one of the most famous myths about Leonardo da Vinci takes place: from here Leonardo in 1506 would have tested one of his flying machines. In this narration the pilot would have been Tommaso Masini, known as Zoroastro da Peretola, one of Leonardo's collaborators.

The myth is the result of the union of two distinct literary episodes. The author of the first is Dmitrij Sergeevič Merežkovskij, a Russian writer who in his novel Leonardo, or the Resurrection of the Gods of 1900, puts Masini to pilot a flying machine conceived by Leonardo with which he launches into the void and then falls, breaking a leg and becoming permanently demented; in the novel the fact occurs in Milan. The novelist inspiration for this anecdote was probably a note by Leonardo from the Milanese period, contained in Codex Atlanticus, in which he recommends keeping a model - presumably of a flying machine - well protected from the eyes of the workers of the yard for the construction of the Duomo. Leonardo's Milanese studio-laboratory was in fact facing the building site.

Close with planks the hall above and make the model large and tall, and would be located on the roof above, and it is the best suited than any other in Italy in all respects. (a small drawing of a flying machine follows within a rectangle) And if you are on the roof beside the tower, the ones of the lantern can't see you.

The author of the second text is Leonardo himself, who in the Code on the Flight of Birds tries to find a way to celebrate the grandeur of the idea of flight, which he speaks of as a future possibility. In two separate pages of the Code Leonardo tries to find the right words. In sheet f. 18v writes:

From the mountain, which bears the name of the great bird, the famous bird will take flight, filling the world of his great fame.

On the second cover of the Code, on the front, he elaborates the text, here in the most famous form:

The great bird will take the first flight, above the back of his great Cècero, filling the universe with amazement, filling all writings with his fame, and eternal glory to the nest where he was born.

These two elements, once joined, explain how what configures itself as a myth was born, one of many on the figure of Leonardo.

There is a plaque on the wall of Villa Il Glicine, near Fiesole, which would attest to the actual completion of the flight. Even the Municipality of Florence in 2006 placed a plaque in Peretola that would commemorate the event; on the top of Monte Ceceri, instead, another plaque contains Leonardo's famous phrase from the Codex on the Flight of Birds.

There are also cases of authors of assured scientific profile who report the fact in books for dissemination purposes, without however citing any source.

To date, no other document or testimony is known, other than those cited above, in which the event is mentioned.

== Modern references ==
Monte Ceceri is mentioned in the theme song for the video game Civilization VI, "Sogno di Volare" ("The Dream of Flight") by Christopher Tin.

== Gallery ==
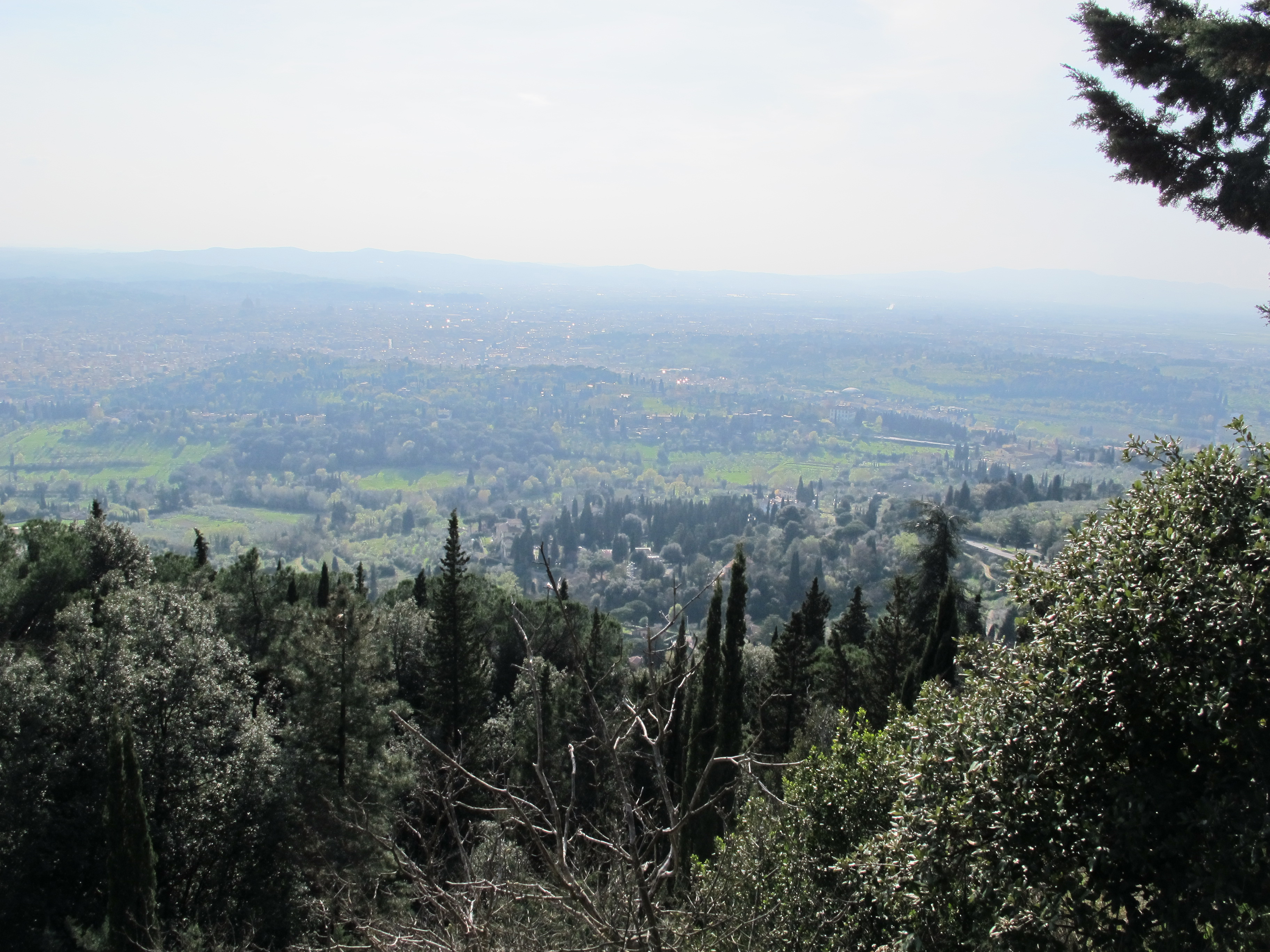
View of the city of Florence

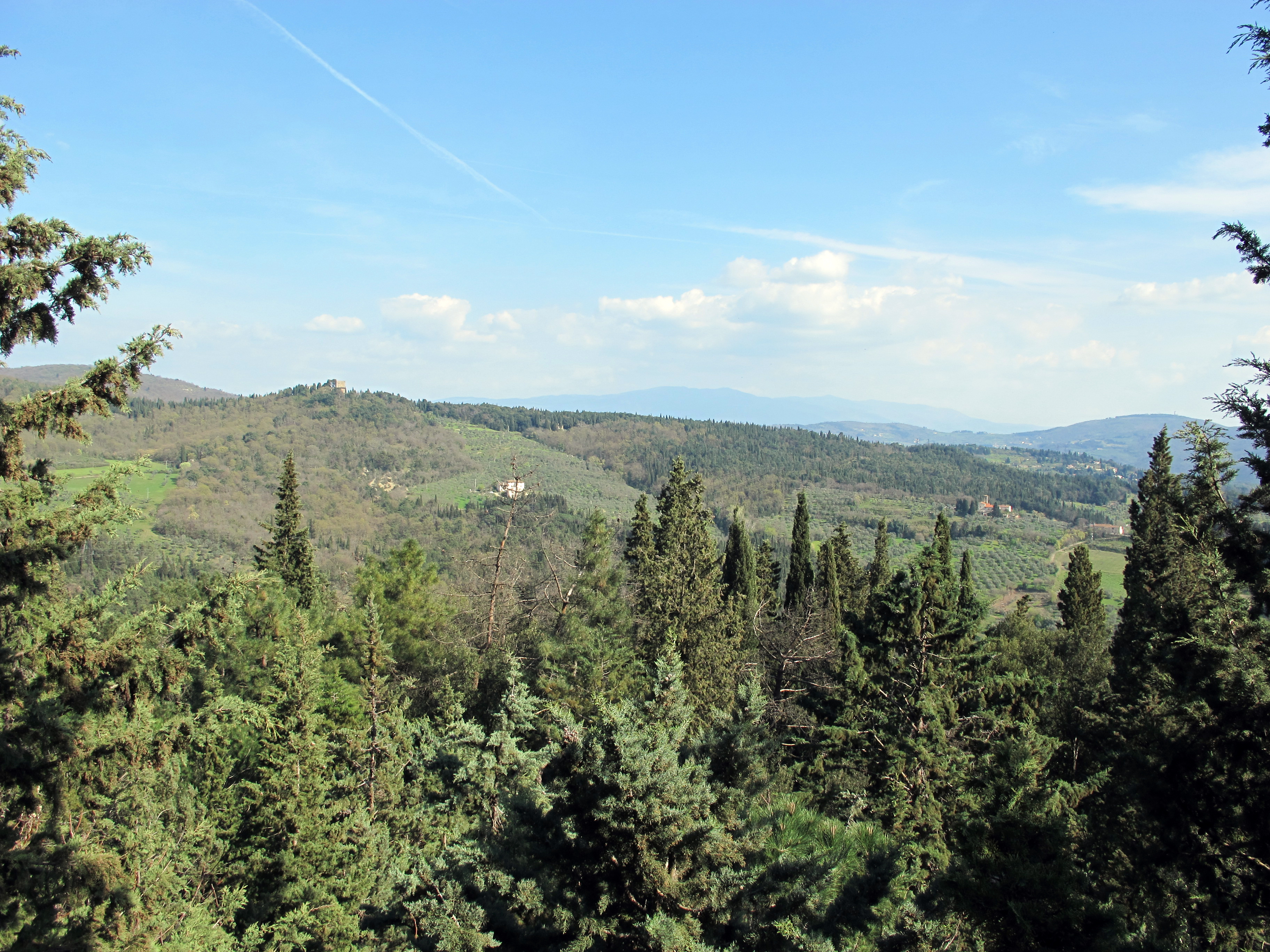
View of the surrounding natural landscape

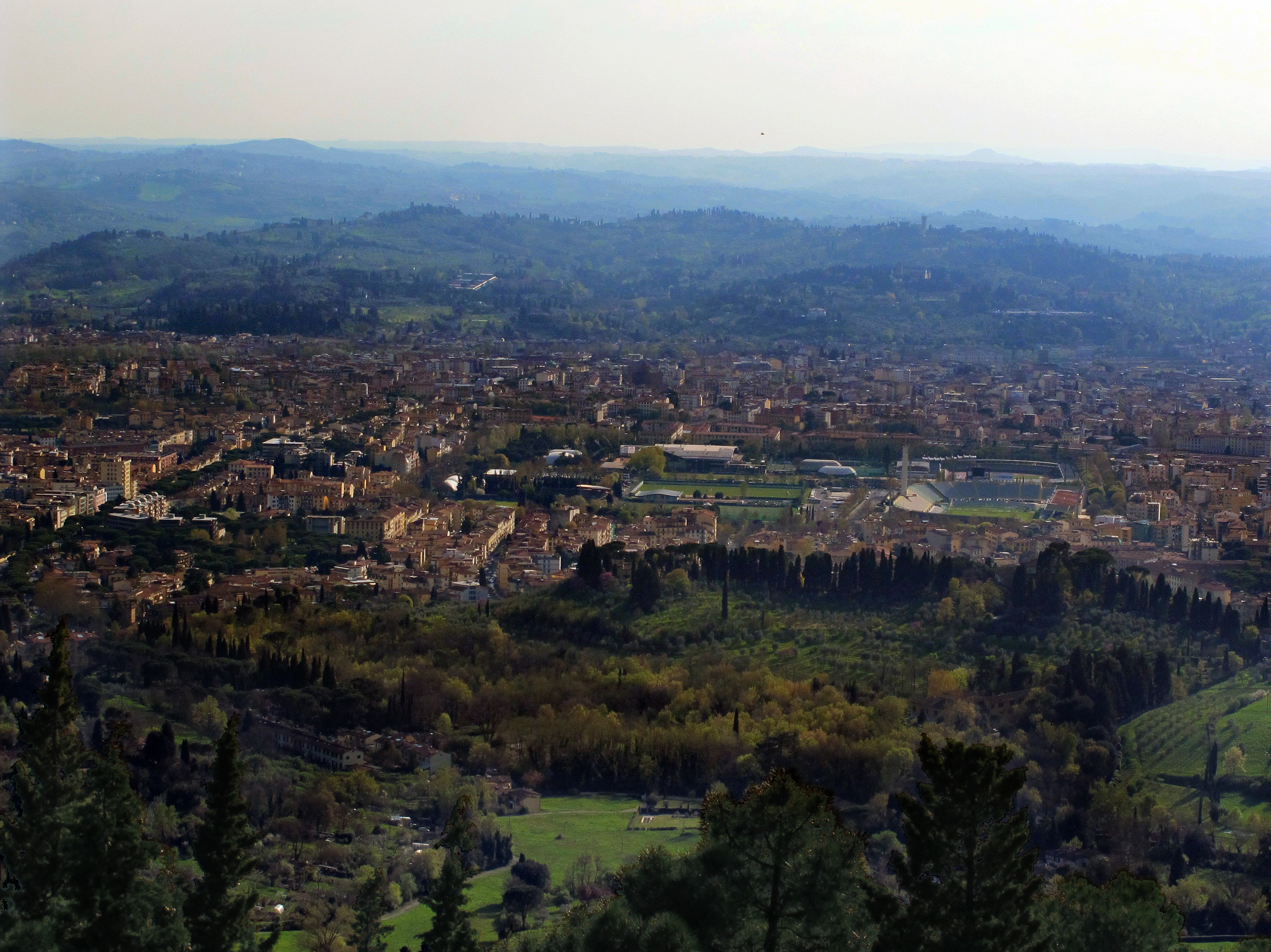
City of Florence from the peak

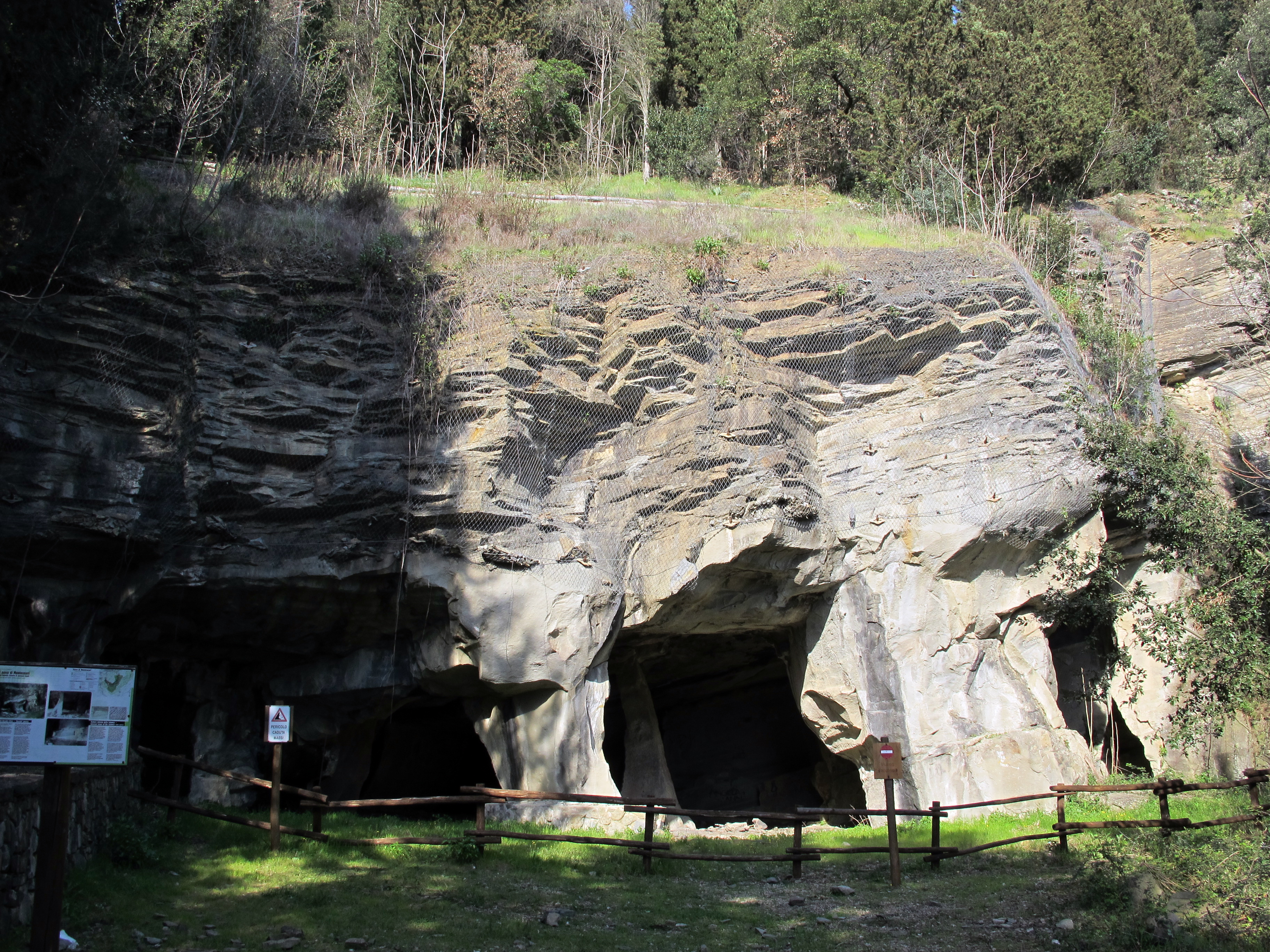
Quarry cave called Cava Fratelli Braschi

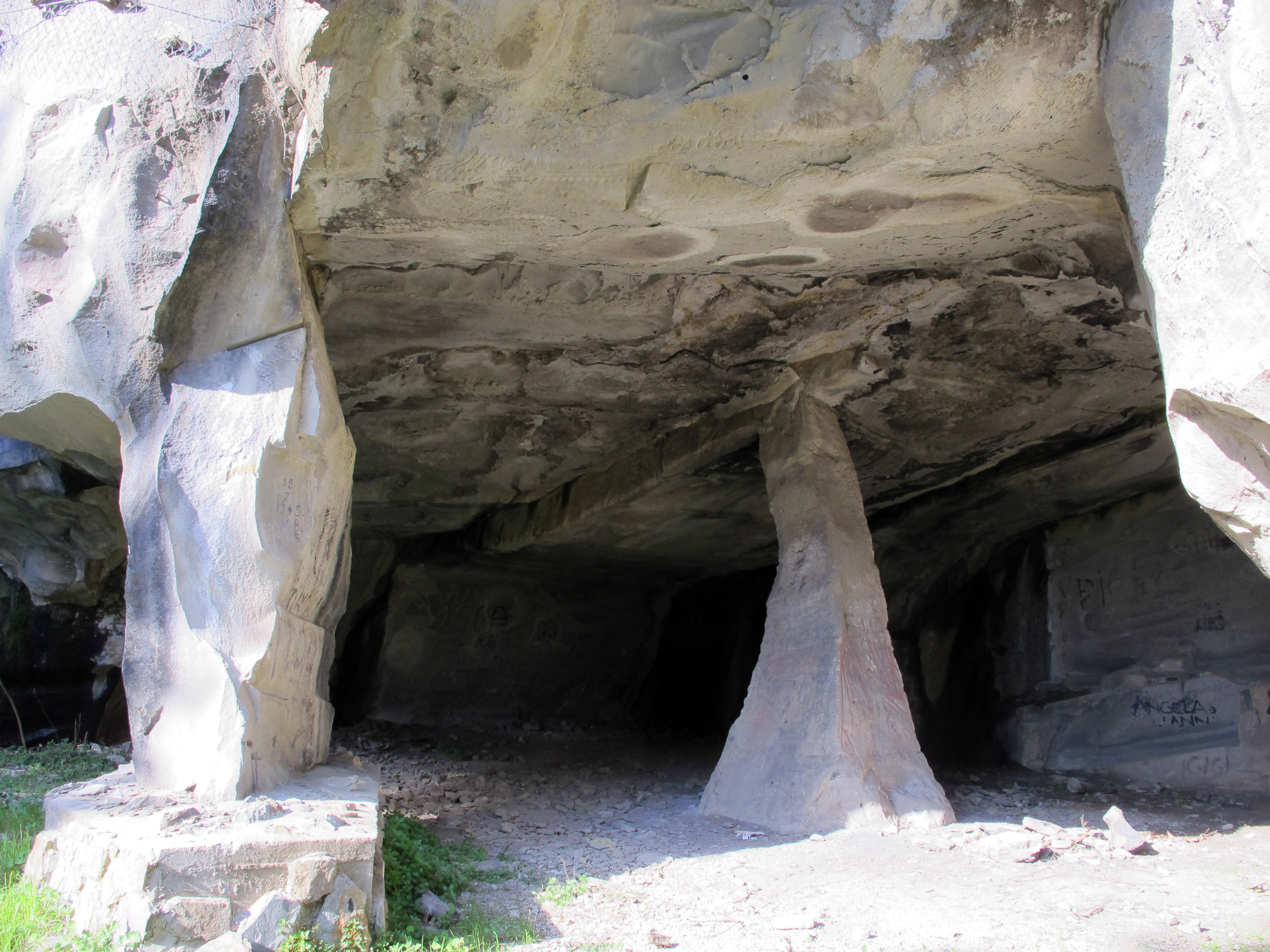
Interior of cave

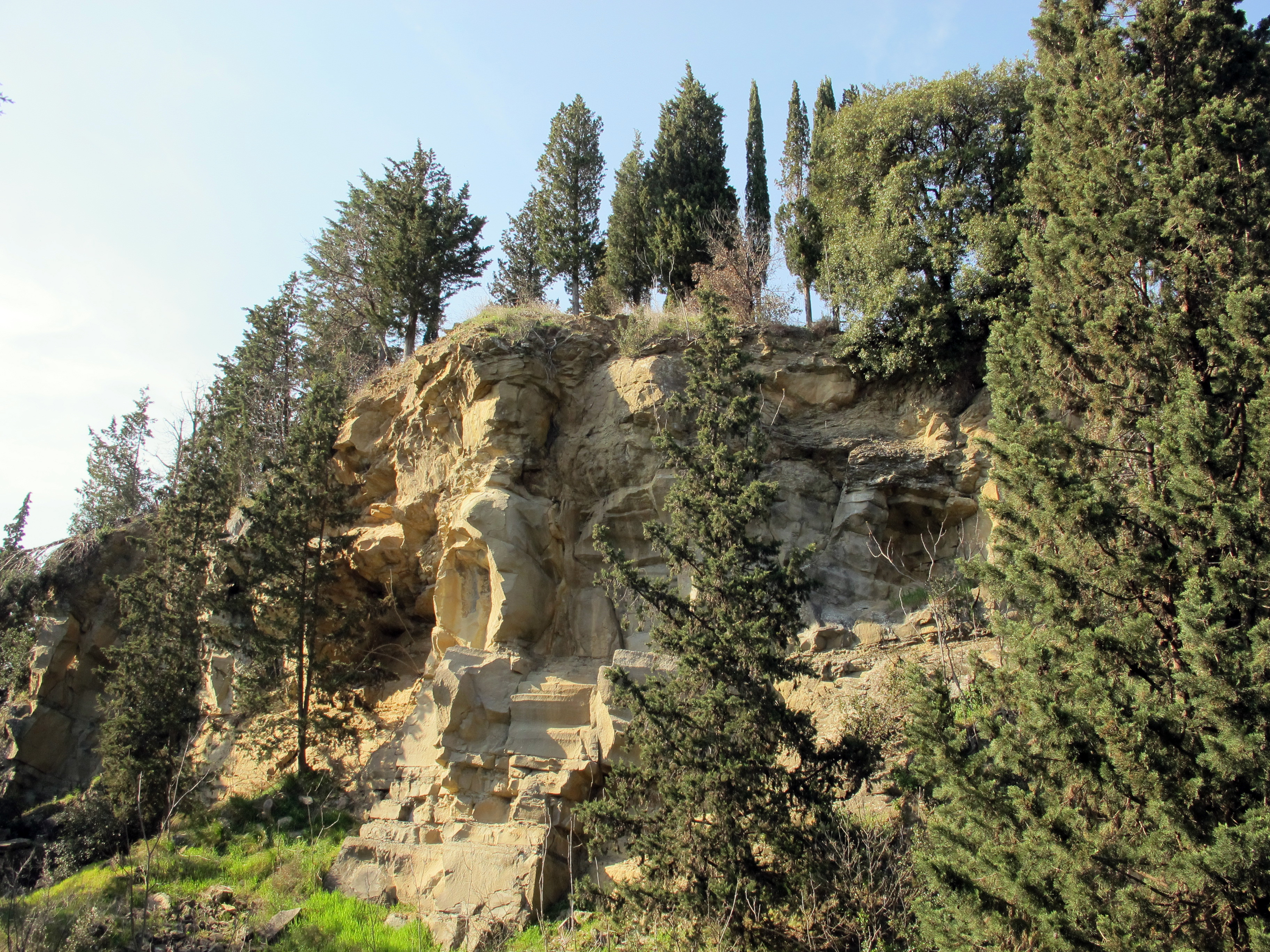
Open quarry portion of the hill

== Bibliography ==
- Domenico Laurenza, Leonardo il Volo - Giunti, Firenze
- Dmitrij Sergeevič Merežkovskij, Leonardo, o la Resurrezione degli Dei (secondo volume della Trilogia del Cristo e dell'Anticristo, 1900). ISBN 4-87187-839-2
- Licia Brescia, Luca Tomio, Tommaso di Giovanni Masini da Peretola detto Zoroastro, in Raccolta Vinciana, 1999
- Documentario Leonardo il Volo di Fiesole (DVD)- Mediaframe, Firenze
- Michael Müller: Toscana. Eigenverlag, Erlangen 2010, S. 172
- Wolfgang Heitzmann/Renate Gabriel: Toskana Nord: Florenz – Apennin – Apuanische Alpen. Die schönsten Tal- und Höhenwanderungen. 50 Touren. Bergverlag Rother 2010, S. 54–55M
