= 1934 Rushcliffe by-election =

UK Parliamentary by-election

The 1934 Rushcliffe by-election was held on 26 July 1934. The by-election was held due to the resignation of the incumbent Conservative MP, Henry Betterton. It was won by the Conservative candidate Ralph Assheton.

== Candidates ==
The Liberal Party selected Arthur Thomas Marwood, who had been their candidate in the 1929 general election. He was a commercial traveller in the grocery trade. He lived locally, in Carlton. He had run a Baptist church.

== Result ==
Rushcliffe by-election, 1934
Party	Candidate	Votes	%	±%
Conservative	Ralph Assheton	19,374	48.8	−23.3
Labour	HJ Cadogan	15,081	38.0	+2.1
Liberal	Arthur Thomas Marwood	5,251	13.2	New
Majority		4,293	10.8	−33.6
Turnout		39,706	56.5	−21.3
Conservative hold		Swing		

== Aftermath ==
Marwood contested Derbyshire North East at the 1935 general election.
