= Different Kind of Blue =

Different Kind of Blue may refer to:

- A Different Kind of Blue, a Miles Davis live DVD
- "Different Kind of Blue", a song by Nick Lowe on the album The Convincer
- "Different Kind of Blue", a song by Gay Dad on the album Leisure Noise
