= Rushcliffe (constituency) =

Parliamentary constituency in the United Kingdom, 1885 onwards

Coordinates: 52.87°N 1.09°W

- County constituency for the House of Commons
- Interactive map of boundaries from 2024
- Location within the East Midlands
- County: Nottinghamshire
- Electorate: 79,160 (March 2020)
- Major settlements: West Bridgford, Cotgrave, Radcliffe-on-Trent, Keyworth, East Leake

Current constituency
- Created: 1885
- Member of Parliament: James Naish (Labour)
- Seats: One
- Created from: South Nottinghamshire

Rushcliffe is a constituency (Note: A county constituency (for the purposes of election expenses and type of returning officer)) in Nottinghamshire represented in the House of Commons of the UK Parliament from 2024 by James Naish, a Labour MP. (Note: As with all constituencies, the constituency elects one Member of Parliament (MP) by the first past the post system of election at least every five years.)

From 1970 until 2019, it was represented by Kenneth Clarke who was Father of the House of Commons for his last two years as an MP. He was appointed to the executive in the governments of Margaret Thatcher, John Major and David Cameron – one of five ministers to serve the whole 18 years of the Thatcher and Major governments. His political career is the fifth-longest in the modern era; he remains a notable figure in British politics.

== Constituency profile ==
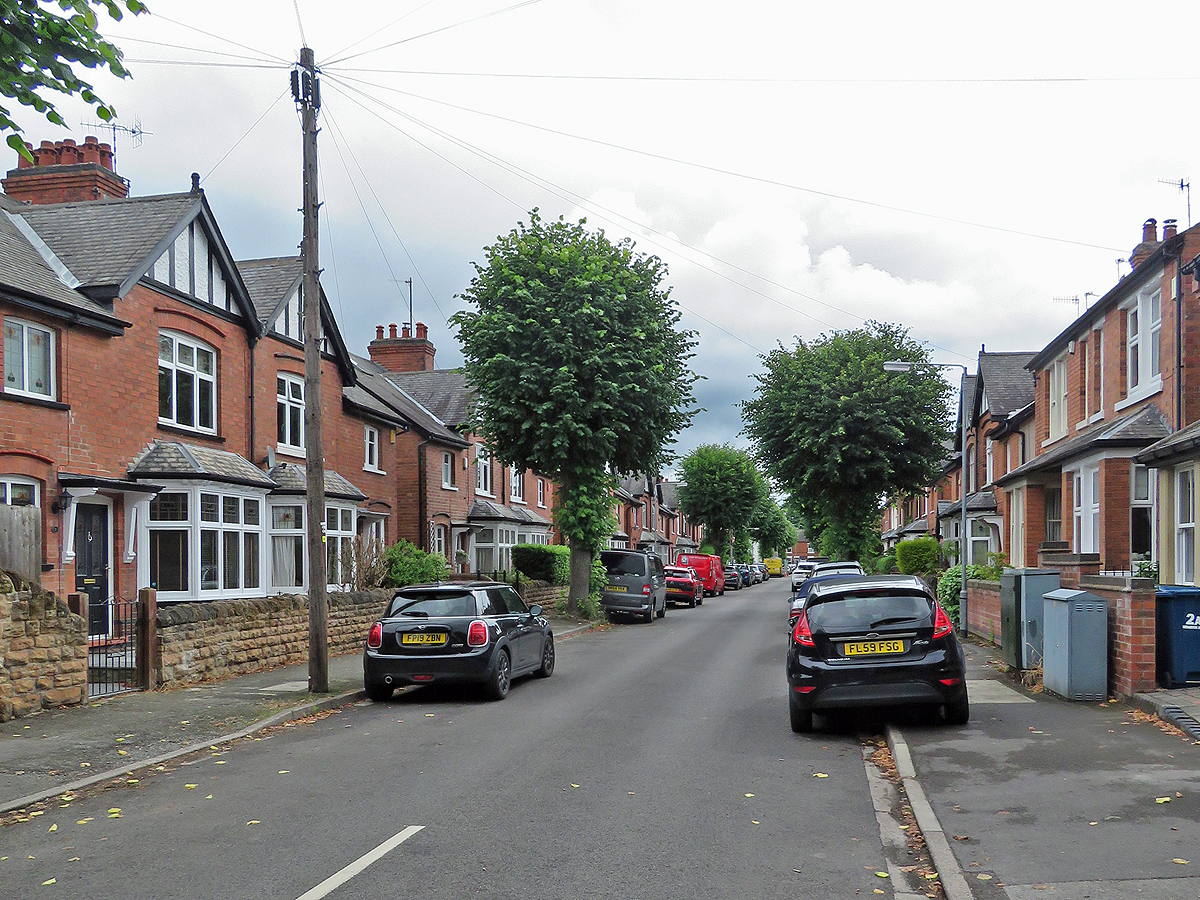
Carnarvon Road, West Bridgford

Rushcliffe is a constituency in Nottinghamshire in the East Midlands of England, taking up most of the borough of the same name. Its largest town is West Bridgford, which has a population of around 46,000 when taken together with its contiguous villages of Edwalton and Gamston. Other settlements include the town of Cotgrave and the villages of East Leake, Ruddington, Keyworth and Radcliffe-on-Trent.

Rushcliffe is one of the country's most affluent constituencies and covers the towns and villages south of Nottingham. West Bridgford is a wealthy, suburban town which is separated from Nottingham by the River Trent and forms part of the city's wider urban area. The town contains Trent Bridge cricket ground and the City Ground, the home of Nottingham Forest F.C. Many West Bridgford residents live in large, expensive detached houses, especially so in Edwalton. The rest of the constituency outside West Bridgford is largely rural with many small villages and also has very low levels of deprivation. House prices across the constituency are generally higher than the UK average and considerably higher than the rest of the East Midlands.

Rushcliffe has a low proportion of young adults and a large retired population. Residents have high levels of income and homeownership and the child poverty rate is less than half the UK-wide rate. They are very well-educated and a high proportion work in the science, technology and arts sectors. The percentage of residents claiming unemployment benefits is around half the nationwide figure. White people made up 89% of the population at the 2021 census.

Most of the constituency is represented by Conservatives at the local council level, with some Labour Party councillors elected in West Bridgford town centre and in Ruddington. An estimated 59% of voters in Rushcliffe supported remaining in the European Union in the 2016 referendum, higher than the UK-wide figure of 48%.

== History ==
The constituency was formed by the Redistribution of Seats Act 1885 (for first use during the election that year).

Between 1950 and 2019, it was considered to have been a safe seat for the Conservative Party, whose members have held it without marginal majorities, except for a four-year period from 1966 when it was held by Labour, coinciding with the first Wilson ministry. Unlike other constituencies nearby, such as Broxtowe and Gedling, which were previously held by the Conservatives, they retained Rushcliffe in the 1997 New Labour landslide; however, it would eventually be won by Labour in another Labour landslide in 2024.

In the 2016 European Union membership referendum, it was the only constituency in the Nottinghamshire and overall East Midlands region to vote Remain (57.6% to 42.4%), even as neighbouring city of Nottingham voted to Leave (50.8% to 49.2%). This can be attributed to the constituency's affluence, as well as then-MP Kenneth Clarke's pro-EU political leanings (he would be the only Conservative MP to vote against triggering Article 50 in 2017.)

== Boundaries ==
=== Historic ===
1885–1918: Part of the Sessional Division of Nottingham.

1918–1950: The Urban Districts of Beeston, Carlton, and West Bridgford, the Rural Districts of Leake and Stapleford, the Rural District which consisted of the parishes of Kingston-on-Soar and Ratcliffe-on-Soar, and in the Rural District of Basford the parishes of Awsworth, Barton-in-Fabis, Bilborough, Bradmore, Bunny, Burton Joyce, Clifton-with-Glapton, Colwick, Cossall, Gamston, Gedling, Gotham, Nuthall, Ruddington, South Wilford, Stoke Bardolph, Strelley, Thrumpton, Trowell, and Wollaton.

1950–1955: The Urban Districts of Beeston and Stapleford, and West Bridgford, and in the Rural District of Basford the parishes of Barton-in-Fabis, Bilborough, Bradmore, Bunny, Clifton with Glapton, Colwick, Costock, East Leake, Gedling, Gotham, Kingston-on-Soar, Normanton-on-Soar, Ratcliffe-on-Soar, Rempstone, Ruddington, Stanford-on-Soar, Sutton Bonington, Thorpe-in-the-Glebe, Thrumpton, West Leake, Willoughby-on-the-Wolds, and Wysall.

1955–1974: The Urban District of Beeston and Stapleford, and in the Rural District of Basford the parishes of Barton-in-Fabis, Bilborough, Bradmore, Bunny, Colwick, Costock, East Leake, Gedling, Gotham, Kingston-on-Soar, Normanton-on-Soar, Ratcliffe-on-Soar, Rempstone, Ruddington, Stanford-on-Soar, Sutton Bonington, Thorpe-in-the-Glebe, Thrumpton, West Leake, Willoughby-on-the-Wolds, and Wysall.

Constituency boundaries 2010-2024

1974–1983: The Urban District of West Bridgford, the Rural District of Bingham, and in the Rural District of Basford the parishes of Barton-in-Fabis, Bradmore, Bunny, Costock, East Leake, Gotham, Kingston on Soar, Normanton on Soar, Ratcliffe on Soar, Rempstone, Ruddington, Stanford on Soar, Sutton Bonington, Thorpe in the Glebe, Thrumpton, West Leake, Willoughby-on-the-Wolds, and Wysall.

1983–2010: The Borough of Rushcliffe.

2010–2024: The Borough of Rushcliffe wards of Abbey, Bunny, Compton Acres, Cotgrave, Cropwell, Edwalton, Gamston, Gotham, Keyworth and the Wolds, Lady Bay, Leake, Lutterell, Musters, Nevile and Langar, Newton, Radcliffe-on-Trent, Ruddington, Soar Valley, Tollerton, and Trent Bridge.

=== Current ===
Further to the 2023 review of Westminster constituencies, which came into effect for the 2024 general election, the composition of the constituency was defined as follows (as they existed on 1 December 2020):

- The Borough of Rushcliffe wards of: Abbey; Bunny; Compton Acres; Cotgrave; Cropwell; Edwalton; Gamston North; Gamston South; Gotham; Keyworth & Wolds; Lady Bay; Leake; Lutterell; Musters; Nevile & Langar; Radcliffe on Trent; Ruddington; Sutton Bonington; Tollerton; Trent Bridge.

The constituency saw minor boundary changes due to the redrawing of local authority ward boundaries.

Following a further local government boundary review in which came into effect in May 2023, the constituency now comprises the following wards of the Borough of Rushcliffe from the 2024 general election:

- Abbey; Bunny; Compton Acres; Cotgrave; Cropwell; Edwalton; Gamston; Gotham; Keyworth & Wolds; Lady Bay; Leake; Lutterell; Musters; Nevile & Langar (nearly all); Newton (part); Radcliffe on Trent; Ruddington; Soar Valley; Tollerton; Trent Bridge.

== Members of Parliament ==
South Nottinghamshire prior to 1885

Election	Member	Party
1885	John Ellis	Liberal
December 1910	Leif Jones	Liberal
1918	Henry Betterton	Coalition Conservative
1922	Henry Betterton	Conservative
1934 by-election	Ralph Assheton	Conservative
1945	Florence Paton	Labour
1950	Martin Redmayne	Conservative
1966	Antony Gardner	Labour
1970	Kenneth Clarke	Conservative
2019	Kenneth Clarke	Independent
2019	Ruth Edwards	Conservative
2024	James Naish	Labour

== Elections ==
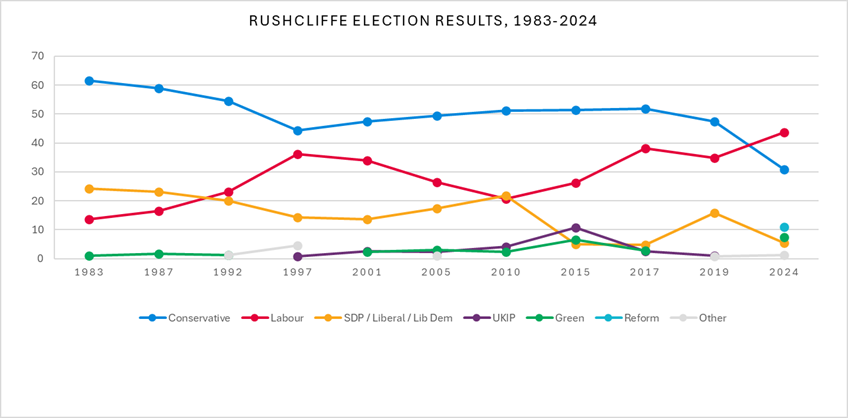
Rushcliffe election results 1983-2024

=== Elections in the 2020s ===
General election 2024: Rushcliffe
Party	Candidate	Votes	%	±%
Labour	James Naish	25,291	43.6	+8.8
Conservative	Ruth Edwards	17,865	30.8	−16.4
Reform	James Grice	6,353	11.0	N/A
Green	Richard Mallender	4,367	7.5	N/A
Liberal Democrats	Greg Webb	3,133	5.4	−10.6
Independent	Lynn Irving	549	1.0	N/A
Independent	Harbant Sehra	186	0.3	N/A
Majority		7,426	12.8	N/A
Turnout		57,744	72.9	−5.2
Registered electors		79,160		
Labour gain from Conservative		Swing	+12.6	

=== Elections in the 2010s ===
General election 2019: Rushcliffe
Party	Candidate	Votes	%	±%
Conservative	Ruth Edwards	28,765	47.5	–4.3
Labour	Cheryl Pidgeon	21,122	34.9	–3.2
Liberal Democrats	Jason Billin	9,600	15.9	+11.2
UKIP	Matthew Faithfull	591	1.0	–1.6
Independent	John Kirby	427	0.7	New
Majority		7,643	12.6	–0.9
Turnout		60,505	78.5	+0.5
Conservative hold		Swing	–0.6	

General election 2017: Rushcliffe
Party	Candidate	Votes	%	±%
Conservative	Kenneth Clarke	30,223	51.8	+0.4
Labour	David Mellen	22,213	38.1	+11.8
Liberal Democrats	Jayne Phoenix	2,759	4.7	–0.3
Green	Richard Mallender	1,626	2.8	–3.7
UKIP	Matthew Faithfull	1,490	2.6	–8.2
Majority		8,010	13.7	–11.4
Turnout		58,311	78.0	+2.7
Conservative hold		Swing	–5.7	

General election 2015: Rushcliffe
Party	Candidate	Votes	%	±%
Conservative	Kenneth Clarke	28,354	51.4	+0.2
Labour	David Mellen	14,525	26.3	+5.6
UKIP	Matthew Faithfull	5,943	10.8	+6.7
Green	Richard Mallender	3,559	6.5	+4.2
Liberal Democrats	Robert Johnston	2,783	5.0	–16.7
Majority		13,829	25.1	–4.4
Turnout		55,164	75.3	+1.7
Conservative hold		Swing	+2.7	

General election 2010: Rushcliffe
Party	Candidate	Votes	%	±%
Conservative	Kenneth Clarke	27,470	51.2	+3.1
Liberal Democrats	Karrar Khan	11,659	21.7	+4.4
Labour	Andrew Clayworth	11,128	20.7	–6.7
UKIP	Matthew Faithfull	2,179	4.1	+1.6
Green	Richard Mallender	1,251	2.3	–1.2
Majority		15,811	29.5	
Turnout		53,687	73.6	
Conservative win (new boundaries)				

=== Elections in the 2000s ===
General election 2005: Rushcliffe
Party	Candidate	Votes	%	±%
Conservative	Kenneth Clarke	27,899	49.5	+2.0
Labour	Edward Gamble	14,925	26.5	−7.5
Liberal Democrats	Karrar Khan	9,813	17.4	+3.8
Green	Simon Anthony	1,692	3.0	+0.7
UKIP	Matthew Faithfull	1,358	2.4	−0.2
Veritas	Daniel Moss	624	1.1	New
Majority		12,974	23.0	+9.5
Turnout		56,311	70.5	+4.0
Conservative hold		Swing	+4.8	

General election 2001: Rushcliffe
Party	Candidate	Votes	%	±%
Conservative	Kenneth Clarke	25,869	47.5	+3.1
Labour	Paul Fallon	18,512	34.0	−2.2
Liberal Democrats	Jeremy Hargreaves	7,395	13.6	−0.7
UKIP	John Brown	1,434	2.6	+1.9
Green	Ashley Baxter	1,236	2.3	New
Majority		7,357	13.5	+5.3
Turnout		54,446	66.5	−12.3
Conservative hold		Swing	+2.6	

=== Elections in the 1990s ===
General election 1997: Rushcliffe
Party	Candidate	Votes	%	±%
Conservative	Kenneth Clarke	27,558	44.4	−10.0
Labour	Jocelyn Pettitt	22,503	36.2	+13.0
Liberal Democrats	Sam Boote	8,851	14.3	−5.7
Referendum	Catherine Chadd	2,682	4.3	New
UKIP	Joseph Moore	403	0.7	New
Natural Law	Anna Miszewska	115	0.2	0.0
Majority		5,055	8.2	−23.0
Turnout		62,112	78.8	−4.2
Conservative hold		Swing	−11.5	

General election 1992: Rushcliffe
Party	Candidate	Votes	%	±%
Conservative	Kenneth Clarke	34,448	54.4	−4.4
Labour	Alan D. Chewings	14,682	23.2	+6.7
Liberal Democrats	Andrew M. Wood	12,660	20.0	−3.0
Green	Simon R. Anthony	775	1.2	−0.5
Ind. Conservative	Morgan Maelor-Jones	611	1.0	New
Natural Law	David Richards	150	0.2	New
Majority		19,766	31.2	−4.6
Turnout		63,326	83.0	+3.0
Conservative hold		Swing	−5.5	

=== Elections in the 1980s ===
General election 1987: Rushcliffe
Party	Candidate	Votes	%	±%
Conservative	Kenneth Clarke	34,214	58.8	−2.7
SDP	Laurence George	13,375	23.0	−1.1
Labour	Paddy Tipping	9,631	16.5	+3.0
Green	Heather Wright	991	1.7	+0.7
Majority		20,839	35.8	−1.6
Turnout		72,797	80.0	+3.1
Conservative hold		Swing		

General election 1983: Rushcliffe
Party	Candidate	Votes	%	±%
Conservative	Kenneth Clarke	33,253	61.5	
Liberal	Julian Hamilton	13,033	24.1	
Labour	Vernon Coaker	7,290	13.5	
Ecology	Maureen Pooks	518	0.9	
Majority		20,220	37.4	
Turnout		54,094	76.9	−4.8
Conservative hold		Swing		

=== Elections in the 1970s ===
General election 1979: Rushcliffe
Party	Candidate	Votes	%	±%
Conservative	Kenneth Clarke	34,196	62.21	
Labour	CIE Atkins	11,712	21.31	
Liberal	Julian Hamilton	9,060	16.48	
Majority		22,484	40.90	
Turnout		54,968	81.69	
Conservative hold		Swing		

General election October 1974: Rushcliffe
Party	Candidate	Votes	%	±%
Conservative	Kenneth Clarke	27,074	54.69	
Labour	V Bell	12,131	24.50	
Liberal	Julian Hamilton	10,300	20.81	
Majority		14,943	30.19	
Turnout		49,505	77.38	
Conservative hold		Swing		

General election February 1974: Rushcliffe
Party	Candidate	Votes	%	±%
Conservative	Kenneth Clarke	29,828	55.58	
Labour	Michael Gallagher	12,119	22.58	
Liberal	Julian Hamilton	11,719	21.84	
Majority		17,709	33.00	
Turnout		53,666	84.57	
Conservative hold		Swing		

General election 1970: Rushcliffe
Party	Candidate	Votes	%	±%
Conservative	Kenneth Clarke	30,966	51.66	
Labour	Antony Gardner	24,798	41.37	
Liberal	Paul M Browne	4,180	6.97	
Majority		6,168	10.29	N/A
Turnout		59,944	79.64	
Conservative gain from Labour		Swing		

=== Elections in the 1960s ===
General election 1966: Rushcliffe
Party	Candidate	Votes	%	±%
Labour	Antony Gardner	25,623	45.80	
Conservative	Martin Redmayne	25,243	45.12	
Liberal	Malcolm J Smith	5,085	9.09	New
Majority		380	0.68	N/A
Turnout		50,866	85.43	
Labour gain from Conservative		Swing		

General election 1964: Rushcliffe
Party	Candidate	Votes	%	±%
Conservative	Martin Redmayne	27,936	52.64	
Labour	Arthur Latham	25,137	47.36	
Majority		2,799	5.28	
Turnout		53,073	83.44	
Conservative hold		Swing		

=== Elections in the 1950s ===
General election 1959: Rushcliffe
Party	Candidate	Votes	%	±%
Conservative	Martin Redmayne	27,392	54.41	
Labour	Neville Sandelson	22,952	44.59	
Majority		4,440	8.82	
Turnout		50,344	85.37	
Conservative hold		Swing		

General election 1955: Rushcliffe
Party	Candidate	Votes	%	±%
Conservative	Martin Redmayne	23,509	51.81	
Labour	David Hardman	21,866	48.19	
Majority		1,643	3.62	
Turnout		45,375	82.86	
Conservative hold		Swing		

General election 1951: Rushcliffe
Party	Candidate	Votes	%	±%
Conservative	Martin Redmayne	30,972	57.92	
Labour	Ron Ledger	22,506	42.08	
Majority		8,466	15.83	
Turnout		53,478	85.95	
Conservative hold		Swing		

General election 1950: Rushcliffe
Party	Candidate	Votes	%	±%
Conservative	Martin Redmayne	27,497	51.47	
Labour	Hugh Lawson	20,860	39.05	
Liberal	Erica Margaret Stallabrass	5,064	9.48	New
Majority		6,637	12.42	N/A
Turnout		53,421	87.77	
Conservative gain from Labour		Swing		

=== Election in the 1940s ===
General election 1945: Rushcliffe
Party	Candidate	Votes	%	±%
Labour	Florence Paton	43,303	54.23	
Conservative	Ralph Assheton	36,544	45.77	
Majority		6,759	8.46	N/A
Turnout		79,847	77.00	
Labour gain from Conservative		Swing		

=== Elections in the 1930s ===
General election 1935: Rushcliffe
Party	Candidate	Votes	%	±%
Conservative	Ralph Assheton	32,320	62.55	
Labour	HJ Cadogan	19,349	37.45	
Majority		12,971	25.10	
Turnout		51,669	67.92	
Conservative hold		Swing		

1934 Rushcliffe by-election
Party	Candidate	Votes	%	±%
Conservative	Ralph Assheton	19,374	48.8	−23.3
Labour	HJ Cadogan	15,081	38.0	+2.1
Liberal	Arthur Thomas Marwood	5,251	13.2	New
Majority		4,293	10.8	−33.6
Turnout		39,706	56.5	−21.3
Conservative hold		Swing		

General election 1931: Rushcliffe
Party	Candidate	Votes	%	±%
Conservative	Henry Betterton	36,670	72.12	
Labour	Florence Paton	14,176	27.88	
Majority		22,494	44.24	
Turnout		50,846	77.79	
Conservative hold		Swing		

=== Elections in the 1920s ===
General election 1929: Rushcliffe
Party	Candidate	Votes	%	±%
Unionist	Henry Betterton	19,145	41.7	−23.3
Labour	Florence Widdowson	16,069	35.0	0.0
Liberal	Arthur Thomas Marwood	10,724	23.3	New
Majority		3,076	6.7	−23.3
Turnout		45,938	79.5	+10.2
Registered electors		57,758		
Unionist hold		Swing	−11.7	

General election 1924: Rushcliffe
Party	Candidate	Votes	%	±%
Unionist	Henry Betterton	17,733	65.0	+20.5
Labour	J.O. Whitwham	9,548	35.0	+10.3
Majority		8,185	30.0	+16.3
Turnout		27,281	69.3	−4.0
Registered electors		39,360		
Unionist hold		Swing	+5.1	

General election 1923: Rushcliffe
Party	Candidate	Votes	%	±%
Unionist	Henry Betterton	12,427	44.5	−12.3
Liberal	John Lewin	8,581	30.8	New
Labour	James Wilson	6,882	24.7	−18.5
Majority		3,846	13.7	+0.1
Turnout		27,890	73.3	+3.4
Registered electors		38,068		
Unionist hold		Swing	+3.1	

General election 1922: Rushcliffe
Party	Candidate	Votes	%	±%
Unionist	Henry Betterton	14,822	56.8	+3.4
Labour	Norman Angell	11,261	43.2	+13.3
Majority		3,561	13.6	−9.1
Turnout		26,083	69.9	+10.7
Registered electors		37,293		
Unionist hold		Swing	−4.8	

=== Elections in the 1910s ===
General election 1918: Rushcliffe
Party		Candidate	Votes	%	±%
C	Unionist	Henry Betterton	10,848	52.4	+10.7
	Labour	Charles Harris	6,180	29.9	New
	Liberal	Leif Jones	3,673	17.7	−40.6
Majority			4,668	22.5	N/A
Turnout			20,701	59.2	−21.1
Registered electors			34,974		
	Unionist gain from Liberal		Swing	+25.7	
C indicates candidate endorsed by the coalition government.

General election December 1910: Rushcliffe
Party	Candidate	Votes	%	±%
Liberal	Leif Jones	9,186	58.3	0.0
Conservative	Coningsby Disraeli	6,580	41.7	0.0
Majority		2,606	16.6	0.0
Turnout		15,766	80.3	−6.5
Registered electors		19,640		
Liberal hold		Swing	0.0	

General election January 1910: Rushcliffe
Party	Candidate	Votes	%	±%
Liberal	John Ellis	9,942	58.3	−4.2
Conservative	Coningsby Disraeli	7,098	41.7	+4.2
Majority		2,844	16.6	−8.4
Turnout		17,040	86.8	+5.4
Registered electors		19,640		
Liberal hold		Swing	−4.2	

=== Elections in the 1900s ===
General election 1906: Rushcliffe
Party	Candidate	Votes	%	±%
Liberal	John Ellis	9,094	62.5	+10.7
Liberal Unionist	H. F. Wyatt	5,460	37.5	−10.7
Majority		3,634	25.0	+21.4
Turnout		14,554	81.4	−0.9
Registered electors		17,883		
Liberal hold		Swing	+10.7	

General election 1900: Rushcliffe
Party	Candidate	Votes	%	±%
Liberal	John Ellis	6,359	51.8	−1.1
Conservative	J. Robinson	5,913	48.2	+1.1
Majority		446	3.6	−2.2
Turnout		12,272	82.3	−2.6
Registered electors		14,906		
Liberal hold		Swing	−1.1	

=== Elections in the 1890s ===
General election 1895: Rushcliffe
Party	Candidate	Votes	%	±%
Liberal	John Ellis	5,752	52.9	−1.1
Liberal Unionist	George Murray Smith	5,119	47.1	+1.1
Majority		633	5.8	−2.2
Turnout		10,871	84.9	+1.5
Registered electors		12,808		
Liberal hold		Swing	−1.1	

General election 1892: Rushcliffe
Party	Candidate	Votes	%	±%
Liberal	John Ellis	5,380	54.0	−4.9
Liberal Unionist	Charles Seely	4,588	46.0	+4.9
Majority		792	8.0	−9.8
Turnout		9,968	83.4	+10.4
Registered electors		11,946		
Liberal hold		Swing	−4.9	

=== Elections in the 1880s ===
General election 1886: Rushcliffe
Party	Candidate	Votes	%	±%
Liberal	John Ellis	4,784	58.9	−5.3
Liberal Unionist	George Savile Foljambe	3,337	41.1	+5.3
Majority		1,447	17.8	−10.6
Turnout		8,121	73.0	−10.1
Registered electors		11,132		
Liberal hold		Swing	−5.3	

General election 1885: Rushcliffe
Party	Candidate	Votes	%	±%
Liberal	John Ellis	5,944	64.2	
Conservative	John Henry Boyer Warner	3,308	35.8	
Majority		2,636	28.4	
Turnout		9,252	83.1	
Registered electors		11,132		
Liberal win (new seat)				

== See also ==
- Parliamentary constituencies in Nottinghamshire

== Notes ==
Parliament of the United Kingdom
Preceded by Kingston-upon-Thames	Constituency represented by the chancellor of the Exchequer; 1993–1997	Succeeded by Dunfermline East
Preceded by Manchester Gorton	Constituency represented by the father of the House; 2017–2019	Succeeded by Worthing West
