= The Guilty Feminist =

Comedy podcast

- Genre: Comedy, Feminism
- Language: English

Creative team
- Created by: Deborah Frances-White; Sofie Hagen (2015-September 2016)

Cast and voices
- Hosted by: Deborah Frances-White + guest co-host
- Starring: e.g. Aisling Bea, Rachel Parris, Felicity Ward, Sindhu Vee

Music
- Theme music composed by: Mark Hodge

Production
- Production: The Spontaneity Shop

Publication
- No. of episodes: 477
- Original release: 15 December 2015

Related
- Website: http://guiltyfeminist.com/

The Guilty Feminist is a feminist comedy podcast hosted by Deborah Frances-White. Created by Frances-White and Sofie Hagen in 2015, the podcast features guests on a panel to discuss topics on and related to feminism, and is recorded in front of a live audience.

== Overview ==
The podcast was created by Deborah Frances-White and Sofie Hagen in December 2015. The idea for the podcast came from the pair having lunch together and often sharing their hypocrisies and double standards with each other. Hagen and Frances-White co-hosted the podcast until September 2016 when Hagen left. Since then a range of guests have co-hosted each episode. The podcast is recorded in front of a live audience and each episode lasts approximately 45 minutes.

Each episode begins with short stories starting with the words "I'm a feminist, but...", with the episode's hosts admitting to moments where they have done or thought something that an ideal feminist wouldn't. Episodes are based around a theme, and topics of discussion have included stereotypes, hair removal, periods, not having children, or purchase of cosmetics. The presenters set themselves weekly challenges, and at the end of each episode audience members are invited to ask the panel questions.

The show has featured guests such as Shappi Khorsandi, Gemma Arterton, Dawn O'Porter, and Aisling Bea. Frances-White aims to create diverse and inclusive panels of guests. In 2023, the house of The Guilty Feminist also launched Media Storm, a news podcast hosted by journalists Mathilda Mallinson and Helena Wadia, featuring underrepresented individuals who are rarely given a chance to voice their lived experience.

In October 2025, Frances-White launched a new series called "The Road to Gilead" to address the rise of American “Christian Nationalism” in the UK. Guests include Jessica Fostekew, Russell T Davies, and Grace Petrie.

== Reception ==
The podcast was shortlisted for an Internet Award in the 2017 Chortle Awards and nominated for Best Podcast in the 2017 Audio & Radio Industry Awards. In The Guardian's 2017 list of best podcasts, Kathryn Bromwich listed The Guilty Feminist as one of her six favourite podcasts in the 'sex, life and relationships' category.
