= Sofie Hagen =

Danish comedian

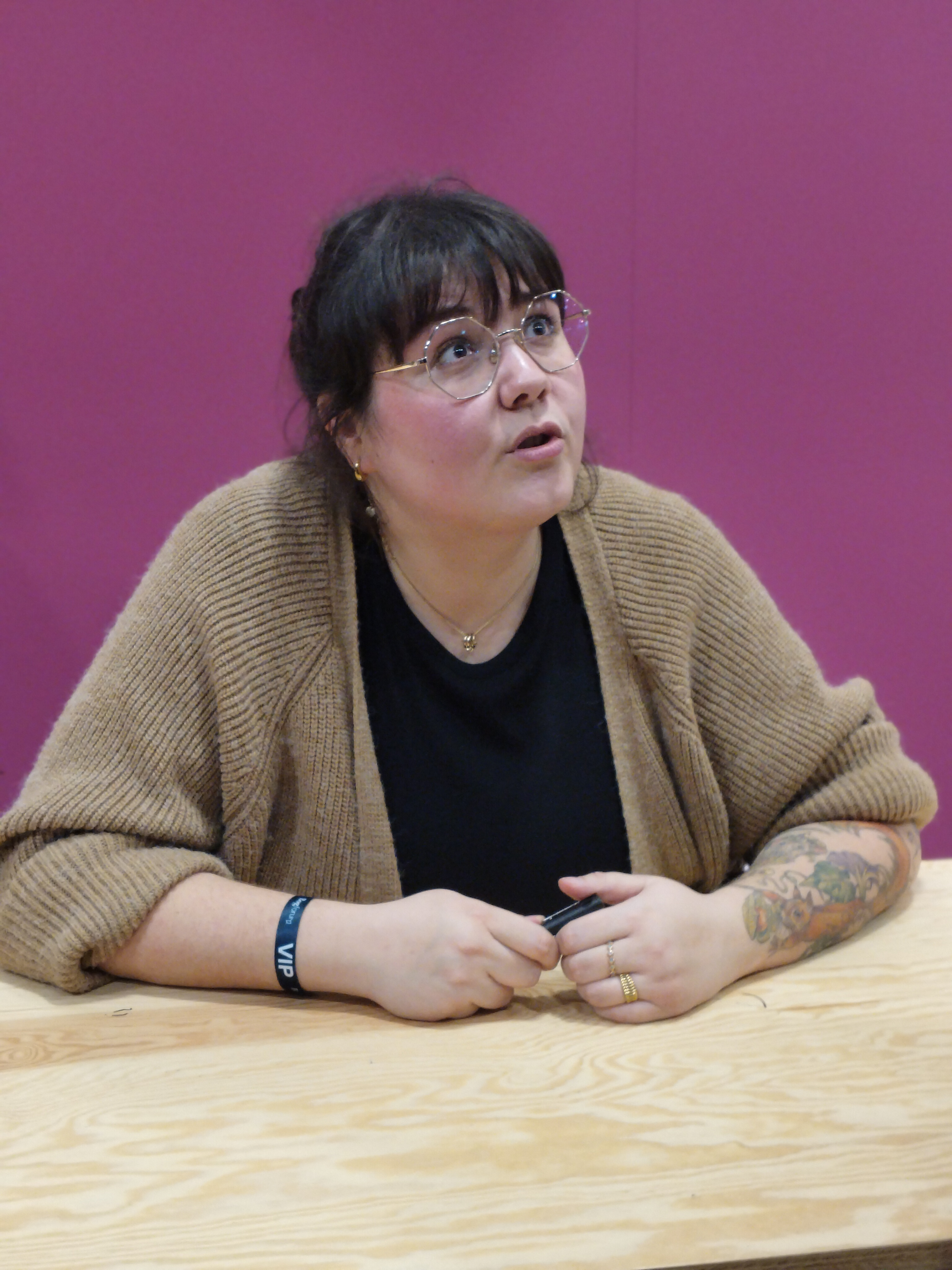
- Hagen in 2025
- Born: November 10, 1988 (age 37); Denmark

Comedy career
- Years active: 2010 - Present
- Medium: Stand-up
- Website: sofiehagen.com

Sofie Hagen (born November 10, 1988) is a Danish comedian, author, podcaster and fat acceptance campaigner. She has toured comedy shows, published two books and hosted and co-hosted several podcasts. She has also written, spoken and campaigned against fatphobia and the body positivity movement.

== Early life and education ==
Hagen was born in Copenhagen, Denmark, on 10 November 1988.

Hagen was raised by her mother in Søndersø. From 2005 to 2008, Hagen attended Allerød Gymnasium, studying the STX, Spanish and Political Science. Hagen watched comedy for the first time aged 15.

Hagen went to university in Copenhagen, where she studied Russian. She studied to become an international social worker. When she started doing comedy she was working for the Danish Refugee Council and Red Cross Youth Denmark.

== Stand-up ==
=== Early career ===
After doing some volunteering work at an open mic night in Copenhagen in 2010, Hagen started doing stand-up in Danish in the same year, also in Copenhagen.

Describing Copenhagen's comedy scene as "insular and limited...with very few women on the circuit.", Hagen moved to London in September 2012 to perform regular comedy. When she moved, she began performing in English. In 2015, Hagen said she enjoyed performing in English more than in Danish because "You have four times as many words as we do in Danish, so the possibility of making ‘the perfect sentence’ for ‘the perfect joke’ is bigger."

In 2013, Hagen attended her first Edinburgh Festival Fringe where she featured in a few shows. She appeared at Rap Battles at Bannermans. The Skinny gave the show a five-star review, describing Hagen as "hilarious". Hagen also featured in Damn Danes with Valdemar Pustelnik. Three weeks, giving the show a 4-star review, described Hagen in the show as "cheerfully downbeat... [with] a wonderful knack for building audience sympathy, then crushing it for a laugh."

In 2013, Time Out identified Hagen as "One to Watch". Hagen won the Laughing Horse New Act of the Year the same year.

In 2014, Hagen won the Chortle Best Newcomer Award for which she was nominated alongside Pierre Novellie, Tim Renkow and Jonny Pelham.

=== 2015: Bubblewrap ===
In August 2015, Hagen took the debut hour show, Bubblewrap, to the Edinburgh Festival Fringe. The show featured stories and anecdotes about her life.

Hagen's show received a last-minute venue change, changing from a 70-seat to a 500-seat venue.

The show won the Foster's Edinburgh Comedy Award (now the Edinburgh Comedy Award) for Best Newcomer. She was also given the ThreeWeeks Editors' Awards.

The show received 5-star reviews from

- ThreeWeeks
- The Skinny who also voted her one of the "Three Top Newcomers"
- The Daily Mirror who described her as "a really interesting new voice with something to say and a great way of saying it"

4-star reviews from:

- Chortle
- Time Out, (who elsewhere described her show as one of "12 newcomers to see at the 2015 Edinburgh Festival Fringe") who described it as "candid" and "cunningly crafted"
- Beyond the Joke, who described it as "hugely entertaining"
- The Herald, who described it as "bursting with new ideas"
- The Sunday Times
- Fest Magazine

Other reception:

- The Guardian described Hagen as one of the "fringe's funniest newcomers", describing her show as "triumphant...in itself and in its message"
- The Independent included the show in an article of "The best comedy shows to book now"
- Broadway Baby gave the show a mixed review, both describing it as "charming", but also saying that "There’s an uneasy balance between the serious issues and her comedy set"
- Broadway Baby described the show as "the most authentic and the most of human of any stand up...at Fringe".

Hagen took the show to Soho Theatre after the Fringe. The show featured a new story about something that had occurred after her show at the Fringe.

=== 2016: Shimmer Shatter ===
In August 2016, Hagen took her second solo show, Shimmer Shatter, to the Edinburgh Festival Fringe. The show explored stories from Hagen's past and current life.

Hagen attempted to make the tour welcoming for fans with anxiety by allowing them to make contact before shows to let her know their needs. She also asked the majority of venues on the tour to provide gender-neutral toilets.

The show received 5-star reviews from:

- Three Weeks

4-star reviews from:

- Beyond the Joke, who named Hagen's show one of the "Ten Must See Edinburgh Fringe Shows"
- The Skinny, who said it was "a warm, subtly empowering hour".
- One4Review, who said "This won’t be the show that makes you laugh the most this Fringe, but it will make you think, make you feel better about the world, and will make you really like Sofie Hagen."

3-star reviews from:

- The Guardian, having named it as one of "the shows we recommend", gave the show a 3-star review, saying that it lacked the "bulletproof set pieces" and "raucous" laughs of her debut show, but that it "confirms her skill at structuring autobiographical comedy"

Other reception:

- Time Out named the show one of "Seven must-see comedy shows at the Edinburgh Fringe".

After the Fringe, Hagen took the show to London's Soho Theatre. The London show changed focus onto different autobiographical stories.

=== 2017: Dead Baby Frog ===
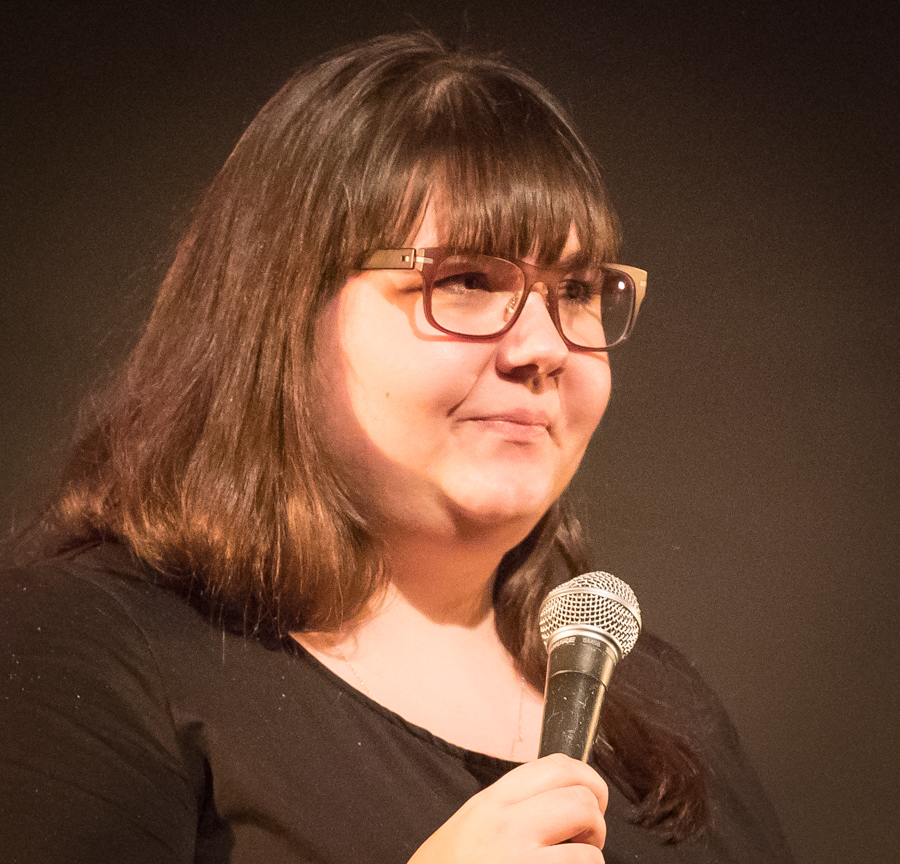
Hagen at Parkteatret in Oslo, Norway, in 2017

In August 2017, Hagen took her third solo show Dead Baby Frog to the Edinburgh Festival Fringe. This was Hagen's first paid show at the Fringe.

The title references the boiled frogs experiment, first conducted by Friedrich Goltz in 1869, that "“proved” frogs make no resistance if slowly boiled alive, and Hagen used this as a metaphor for some autobiographical stories. She also returned to the issue of fatphobia in her set, responding to another comic's dismissal of the idea at the last year's Fringe. On entry, Hagen provided audience members a flyer with a trigger warning for the show.

The show received a 4-star review from To Do List, who called it "a pretty personal show in which she does not hold back" It received a 3.5-star review from Chortle, who described the show as "a speedy, feelgood hour, which might be surprising" given the content. It received 3-star reviews from: The Skinny, who said that Hagen "manages to tackle a tricky subject matter delicately without pushing it too heavily on to the audience"; andThe Wee Review, who said that "Hagen comes across as a thoroughly delightful person whom everyone is rooting for", but "the weighty themes of the show means that it’s more cathartic confession than comedy."

Other reception:

- The show received a mixed review from The Guardian, who described it as "urgent, raw and confessional" yet "her jokes burn at a low flame, and can feel dutiful."
- The List described it as "a compelling tale of resistance and breaking free from the shackles of tyranny"
- The Skinny named it their number one pick for comedy at the Fringe 2017

=== 2018 ===
In 2018, Hagen took her work-in-progress show to the Edinburgh Festival Fringe.

=== 2019: The Bumswing ===
In 2019, Hagen took her fourth solo show The Bumswing to the Edinburgh Festival Fringe. The name comes from Swansea, i.e. Shame town, twinned with Skamby in Denmark, which is Hagen's home town. Hagen wanted to create a lighter show, saying that it was "a complete step away from any activism and it’s just pure me doing stand-up again."

Hagen won the Audience Award in the Comedy Poster Awards for her poster for The Bumswing. The photographer for the poster was Matt Crockett. The designer was Haiminh Le and the designer of the jumpsuit was Jazmin Lee from Plus Equals. Hagen said that the idea for the poster was for it to be like a Magic Eye poster.

The show received 4-star reviews from:

- One4review, who described the show as "minimal" and a "Great show from a great comedian."
- Broadway World, who said it was "a sweet comedy show with lots of laughs throughout and a great twist"

Other reception:

- The List wrote "everything has a purpose in this beautifully created narrative with an apparently deliciously unreliable narrator." about the show.

After the Edinburgh Fringe, Hagen took The Bumswing on a UK tour.

In 2019, Hagen also participated, alongside other comedians, in a benefit gig in aid of mental health charities, Mind and SAMH (Scottish Association for Mental Health) on the anniversary of the death of Robin Williams. She hosted the show alongside Nish Kumar.

On 15 August, Hagen also participated in Werewolf: Live - Charity Spectacular!, a charity show raising money for Kidney Research UK, hosted by Jon Gracey.

=== 2021 ===
In 2021, Hagen took her work-in-progress show Optimistically Working On A New Show, In Case The World Doesn't End to the Edinburgh Festival Fringe. She attended the Fringe without a preconceived concept or plan of what the show would be. The Fringe took place in light of the covid-19 pandemic, having been cancelled the previous year and held with social distancing guidelines in 2021.

Hagen has said that the pandemic changed the way she thought about her audience. Previously, she had found it hard to manage the amount of people who told them about their struggles in response to her shows. During the pandemic, her fans kept her afloat financially and with support, and she realised she had created a community.

=== 2022: Fat Jokes ===
In 2022, Hagen took her solo show Fat Jokes to the Edinburgh Festival Fringe. The show explored several themes, particularly fatphobia. She discusses "society's 'deeply ingrained' anti-fat bias and the way it marginalises people, particularly women."

The show received a 5-star review from One4Review, who described it as "is a brilliantly crafted hour of Jokes about some of the everyday absurdities of being a fat person in the world." It received a 3.5-star review from Chortle, who said that "the individual elements of Fat Jokes work well, there’s not a strong enough narrative arc". It received a 3-star review from The List, who describes it as a "Mixed bag of a show which both challenges and comforts her audience" Broadway Baby called it "a highlight of this year's festival" highlighting Hagen's "awkward...relatable, cringeworthy" stories and "physical humour"

=== 2023: Banglord ===
In 2023, Hagen took her show Banglord to the Edinburgh Festival Fringe.

The show was about personal anecdotes from Hagen's life. Hagen started the show with showing the audience a breakdown of what would be discussed within the hour.

The show was named in the British Comedy Guide's Best reviewed Edinburgh Fringe shows 2023.

The show received 5-star reviews from:

- Funny Women, who said that "this show is a departure where the Danish comedian shares their love of gossip" and, in this show "Self-exploration has been replaced with sheer glee and it makes for an incredibly fun show where you will leave wishing Sofie was your leader."
- The Wee Review
- Entertainment Now

4-star reviews from:

- Broadway World, describing it as "a solid hour that tackles topics that aren't really being discussed with sensitivity but also provides big laughs."
- Fest Magazine, who describes it as "Frivolous in the present and often dark in its reaches into the past, Banglord roams just about everywhere tonally."
- The i Paper (who also listed the show as one of "The best shows to see" at the Edinburgh Fringe 2023), calling it "an enjoyable and intriguing hour."
- One4review, who said "the show probably shouldn’t cohere as well as it did, but Ms Hagen is an excellent writer as well as performer, and so her narrative skill and her delivery make it work."

=== 2026: I Think Some of This Is My Fault ===
After work-in-progress shows in 2025, Hagen took her show I Think Some of This Is My Fault to the Melbourne International Comedy Festival in Spring 2026 and the Edinburgh Festival Fringe in August 2026.

Broadway World named the show in their "EDINBURGH 2026: Pick of the Programme – Comedy". The i Paper named the show one of "The 29 best shows to see at Edinburgh Fringe 2026".

== Television ==
In July 2016, Hagen appeared in the Channel 4 miniseries Outsiders. It was first made as part of Channel 4's Comedy Blaps scheme for new comedy talent. The premise was about foreign young people moving to the fringes of London to share a flat. The script came out of improvisation from the comic actors. The Guardian described it as, in light of Brexit, speaking "to the weird sense of isolation that young remainers are feeling, adrift in a backwards, xenophobic world."

== Writing ==
In November 2015, Virago Press Hagen published an essay in the collection I Call Myself a Feminist.

=== 2019: Happy Fat ===
On 2 May 2019, Hagen published her debut book Happy Fat – Taking Up Space in a World That Wants to Shrink You published by 4th Estate. The book documents her experiences of being fat, and fatphobia. It mixes this with political commentary, statistics, scientific studies and interviews with activists.

Key to the book is the idea that "fatphobia is a product of capitalism – designed to keep us consuming diet products and miracle foods; and patriarchy – which demands women exert an impossible level of self-discipline around their looks” and so, to "challenge fatphobia is to challenge capitalism and to see fat people in the context of other marginalised groups". These ideas come from the fat liberation movement in 1960s New York.

As part of her 2019 tour of her show Bubblewrap, she read from the book and gave a Q&A.

The Wee Review gave Happy Fat a three-star review, saying that the "constant change of styles is quite jarring on the reader and certainly doesn’t make for a seamless read as we are jumped back and forth from an interview to a childhood experience and then onto a reference to a medical research report."

=== 2024: Will I Ever Have Sex Again? ===
Hagen published a questionnaire online saying: "“If you do not have sex, but you wish you were, why do you think that is?” Thinking she would receive few replies, she closed the link within two days as she was receiving too many responses. Because of this she decided to write a book about the subject. Her book, Will I Ever Have Sex Again? was published by Blink in May 2024.

In her book, Hagen provides "a guide to how societal norms have shaped our understanding and experiences of sex, and sometimes prevented us from having it." Through this, she discusses her own experiences, pulls from the experiences in her survey, and ideas from experts. In writing about her own experiences, Hagen was inspired by Rebecca Humphries' memoir Why Did You Stay? She also discusses how systems of oppression are barriers to sex.

In the book, Hagen lays out "the four stages of 'no'":

1. "you have to trust your ability to feel if you want sex"
2. "you have to trust your ability to say no"
3. "you have to trust that your partner can hear or interpret your no"
4. "You have to trust that they will stop if you say no."

=== Prospective third book ===
Hagen has said she is working on a third book.

== Podcasts ==
Hagen has a long history of making podcasts.

=== 2013–2016: Comedians Telling Stuff ===
Hagen hosted Comedians Telling Stuff, a podcast series where she asks six questions of six comedians. The show began in August 2013 and ran for nine seasons before ending in 2016. Guests have included Susan Calman, Nick Helm, Richard Herring, Michael Legge, Josie Long, Colin Mochrie, Pappy's, Katherine Ryan, Ian Boldsworth, Shappi Khorsandi and Arthur Smith, as well as younger comedians and comedians from Denmark.

The Guardian, discussing the podcast, called Hagen "the funny face of Generation Overshare", noting that the podcast "has harnessed an army of similarly socially awkward followers".

=== 2015–2016: The Guilty Feminist ===
In 2015, Hagen co-founded the The Guilty Feminist podcast with Deborah Frances-White. To quote the show, the podcast explores "our novel goals as 21st-century feminists and our hypocrisies and insecurities which undermine them". Hagen was a co-host from December 2015 to December 2016.

In 2016, Hagen and Frances-White took the podcast to the Edinburgh Fringe Festival with special guest Susan Calman. The show was given a 5-star review by One4Review, who said they'd "never heard an audience so absorbed or concentrate so hard at a Fringe show – or even in a university lecture – as this audience did to the issues presented."

=== 2016–2021: Made of Human Podcast/Who Hurt You? ===
In 2016, Hagen created the Made of Human podcast (also known as MohPod), in which she interviewed various comedians, activists and notable people. The podcast was about "how people who are 'socially awkward and introvert' cope with life." In April 2021, Hagen changed the podcast name to Who Hurt You? After the name change, Hagen described the podcast as being about "why we are the way we are. Who and what shaped us? What role did society play? Our families and childhoods? Our role models and friends?"

Hagen interviewed many guests for the podcast including Cameron Esposito, Aisling Bea, Mark Watson, Lolly Adefope, Hari Kondabolu, Nish Kumar, Katherine Ryan, Josie Long, Katy Brand, Felicity Ward, Richard Gadd, Sara Pascoe, Gwen Adshead, Rabia Chaudry, Tigress Osborn and Aubrey Gordon.

The podcast had its own Facebook page where fans would connect on Saturday nights on Facebook Live.

In 2018, Hagen took the podcast to the Machynlleth Comedy Festival.

The New Statesman named Made of Human one of their top ten podcasts in 2017. The Blurt Foundation named Made of Human one of their top 10 podcasts in 2018. Hannah Parkinson from The Guardian interviewed Hagen about Made of Human when she visited Edinburgh and named it a top podcast from the Edinburgh Fringe Festival. The Skinny said the podcast guests are "great cross-section of interesting perspectives" and described the show as both cheery and intimate.

In 2020, Hagen changed the name of the Made of Human Podcast to Who Hurt You?.

=== 2018: Secret Dinosaur Cult ===
In 2018, Hagen created the Secret Dinosaur Cult podcast with fellow comedian and drag king Jodie Mitchell (who was part of Edinburgh University's Improverts troupe). The first episode was released on 15 October. The podcast is about secrets and human behaviour, using dinosaur behaviour as a metaphor. It covered themes such as queerness, trauma and body positivity. Their episodes were recorded in front of a live audience at their so-called "cult meetings".

The podcast began when Hagen had planned to start a new podcast with a presenter who did not show up to the live recording at the Edinburgh Fringe, and Mitchell was in the audience and they created an improvised podcast show together.

In 2019, Hagen and Mitchell took the podcast to the 2019 Edinburgh Festival Fringe.

The Irish Times named the podcast "Podcast of the week" in December 2018, calling it "funny...atmospheric and intimate and genuinely unusual." as well as "feminist, queer and extremely refreshing." The Guardian also named it one of the "podcasts of the week", as their "Producer pick", saying that "it feels like catching up with your best mate and sharing all your worst secrets." Curve magazine described the podcast as "hilarious, whimsical, relatable, cathartic and T-Rexcellent." A negative review was given by The Mancunion, about their performance at the Manchester Podcast Festival, who said that "There is no doubt that they are funny comedians. However, to expect an audience to sit (for over an hour) listening to what was essentially just a random, generic conversation about life, is a little disappointing."

The podcast ended on April 11, 2020, after 48 episodes, due to COVID-19.

=== 2020–2023: Bad People ===
From 2020 to 2023, Hagen co-hosted the BBC Sounds/BBC Radio 4 true crime podcast Bad People with criminal psychologist Dr Julia Shaw. The Guardian described the two hosts as "loquacious and funny", with Shaw sharing "some fascinating information between their bants".

=== 2022–Present: Help Hole ===
Hagen created and presents Help Hole with comedian Abby Wambaugh. The podcast started after Hagen and Wambaugh met in 2022 and Wambaugh was opening Hagen's shows in Denmark, followed by a long road trip. The podcast's premise is "Comedians Read Self Help Books So You Don’t Have To?" They have read books including Four Thousand Weeks, The Body Keeps the Score and War of Art.

At first, in addition to the main podcast, two bonus episodes were released on Patreon for subscribers, where they also discussed films, documentaries and apps. After releasing an episode on The Artist's Way, they did a 12-week program of the book on Patreon.

From May 2025, the podcast now only posts bi-weekly episodes on Patreon.

=== 2026–Present: Sofieland: The Bunker ===
Hagen started her podcast Sofieland: The Bunker in 2026.

== Awards ==
Year	Status	Award	Awarding Body	Ref
2012	Finalist	Funny Women Awards		
2012	3rd	New Comedian of the Year	Leicester Square Theatre	
2013	Winner	New Act of the Year	Laughing Horse	
2014	Winner	Best Newcomer	Chortle Awards	
2015	Winner	Best Newcomer	Fosters Award (now the Edinburgh Comedy Award)	
2015	Winner (of 10)	Editors' Awards	ThreeWeeks	
2016	Nominee	Danish Comedian of the Year		
2019	Winner	Audience Award	Comedy Poster Awards	
2019	Shortlist	Panel Award	Comedy Poster Awards	

Hagen has also hosted awards including:

- 2022 – 12th Annual Lovie Awards, presented by The Webbys

== Politics ==
=== Feminism ===
Hagen says she was not a feminist when she lived in Denmark because she did not understand it at the time and said that "In Denmark, feminism is an active choice you have to make, and when you do it you will probably lose friends. People will not want to talk to you at parties because you are known as The Feminist." It was when she moved to London that she understood more and became a feminist.

=== Fat and fatphobia ===
Hagen has spoken openly about her experience of being fat. The List describes her as "on a mission to proudly reclaim fatness as an identity that needs not only accepted but embraced, and she wants fat people to feel safe in her audience." She disagrees with the body positivity movement, saying that it "is just another way of asking women to smile" and is tied to consumerism. She rejects the idea that we should all love our bodies (which often leads to feeling like a failure), and prioritises "body neutrality", which "focuses on respect and acceptance of your body". For this reason, she decides to use the word "fat" to describe herself, seeing it as a neutral descriptive word, contrasting with "overweight" and other terms that see being fat as something negative and needing to be changed.

In 2017, Hagen chaired Stylist's discussion of body-positivity for Stylist Live, which also featured Megan Jayne Crabbe (AKA Body Posi Panda) and Harnaam Kaur.

In January 2018, Hagen wrote an article in The Guardian calling for people to stop dieting, labelling it as "boring", "triggering", and "neither feminist – nor healthy". She also stated she is part of the fat acceptance movement.

In 2018, Hagen commented on a campaign by Cancer Research stating that obesity is the second biggest cause of cancer after smoking saying that it was "damaging and fatshaming" and would increase the stigma fat people face. Cancer Research replied saying that they did not intend to fatshame anyone, but have a "duty to inform" people of the links between obesity and cancer. Linda Bauld, Cancer Research UK's prevention expert also commented: "This is not about fat-shaming. It is based on scientific evidence and designed to give important information to the public."

In 2018, Hagen performedYou can be fat and happy for TEDxLondonWomen. In the talk she argues that fatphobia, including dieting culture, is a product of and maintains capitalism and the patriarchy. She provides points of advice for other fat people to help them embrace body positivity:

1. "You're allowed to love your body. It's okay to be fat. You can be fat and happy."
2. Affirmations
3. Unfollow social media accounts that make you feel bad about yourself
4. "Look at fat bodies" – follow social media accounts that portray fat bodies
5. Fight the people, organisations, societal standards who make fat people feel bad about themselves

Also in 2018, Hagen wrote an article for The Guardian about fatphobia on TV, with specific reference to Netflix's Insatiable. Also in 2018, Hagen judged "Hamburger Queen", a plus-sized beauty pageant curated and hosted by Scottee at Shoreditch Town Hall.

In 2019, Hagen recorded the programme Sofie Hagen: How To Love Your Fat for BBC Radio 4. It covered fatphobia, and what it means to love your body.

In 2023, Hagen published an article in The Guardian providing guidance to venues to inform them how to accommodate fat people. This included:

1. Put seat measurements on your website
2. Provide alternatives to normal seating
3. Educate staff on this issue

In 2023, Hagen was also lobbying venues to publish seat sizes.

== Live performances ==
=== Tours ===
Year	Title	Locations	Countries	Ref
2016	Shimmer Shatter			
2017	Dead Baby Frog		UK, Denmark	
2019	Bubblewrap, Happy Fat	12 venues	UK	
2019 - 2020	The Bumswing		UK	
2022	Fat Jokes			
2026	I Think Some of This Is My Fault			

=== Festivals and shows ===
Year	Title	Venue	Festival	Notes	Ref
2013	Damn Danes	The Counting House	Edinburgh Fringe Festival	With Valdemar Pustelnik	
2013	Crying Duck Crash Lands...	Bar 50	Edinburgh Fringe Festival	With Amir Khoshsokhan, Matthew Comras, George Colebrook	
2013	Rap Battles	Bannermans	Edinburgh Fringe Festival		
2015	Bubblewrap (Preview)		Balham Free Fringe Festival		
2015	Bubblewrap	Liquid Rooms	Edinburgh Fringe Festival		
2015	For Robin Williams: A Benefit Gig in aid of Mind and SAMH	Liquid Rooms	Edinburgh Fringe Festival	Cabaret	
2018	For Robin Williams: A Benefit Gig in aid of Mind and SAMH	Assembly	Edinburgh Fringe Festival	Cabaret	
2019	For Robin Williams: A Benefit Gig in aid of Mind and SAMH	Assembly	Edinburgh Fringe Festival	Cabaret	
2015	Bubblewrap	Soho Theatre			
2016	Bubblewrap	Copenhagen			
2016	Bubblewrap		Leicester Comedy Festival		
2016	Work-in-progress	Anglers (Teddington)			
2016	The Guilty Feminist With Sofie Hagen and Deborah Frances-White	Gilded Balloon	Edinburgh Fringe Festival	With Deborah Frances-White	
2016	Shimmer Shatter	Liquid Rooms	Edinburgh Fringe Festival		
2016	Shimmer Shatter	Soho Theatre			
2017	Dead Baby Frog	Bedlam Theatre			
2018	Made of Human	The Sixth Form	Machynlleth Comedy Festival		
2018	Sofie Hagen Tries Something (Preview)		Berlin Fringe		
2018		The Counting House	Edinburgh Fringe Festival		
2019	The Bumswing	Pleasance Dome	Edinburgh Fringe Festival		
2019	Werewolf: Live - Charity Spectacular!	Underbelly	Edinburgh Fringe Festival	Cabaret	
2019	Secret Dinosaur Cult Live	Bedlam Theatre	Edinburgh Fringe Festival	With Jodie Mitchell	
2019	Mark Watson and Sofie Hagen will each do 30 minutes of not-really-jokes-yet	Monkey Barrel	Edinburgh Fringe Festival	With Mark Watson	
2020			Vault Festival (London)		
2020			Glasgow International Comedy Festival		
2021	Optimistically Working On A New Show, In Case The World Doesn't End	Monkey Barrel	Edinburgh Fringe Festival		
2022	Fat Jokes	Monkey Barrel	Edinburgh Fringe Festival		
2022			Leamington Spa Comedy Festival		
2022			Harrogate Comedy Festival		
2022		The Lemon Tree	Aberdeen Comedy Festival		
2023	Banglord	Monkey Barrel	Edinburgh Fringe Festival		
2023			Hay Festival		
2024	Sofie Hagen Does Something Old, Something New, Nothing Borrowed, Lots of Blue	Monkey Barrel	Edinburgh Fringe Festival		
2025	Sofie Hagen Tries To Write A New Show (And Needs You To Be There)	The Bill Murray			
2026	I Think Some of This Is My Fault	The Greek	Melbourne International Comedy Festival		
2026	I Think Some of This Is My Fault	Monkey Barrel	Edinburgh Fringe Festival		

== Audiography ==
=== Podcasts ===
Year	Title	Notes	Ref
2013–2016	Comedians Telling Stuff		
2015–2016	The Guilty Feminist		
2016–2020	Made of Human Podcast/Who Hurt You?		
2018	Secret Dinosaur Cult		
2020–2023	Bad People		
2022–Present	Help Hole		
2026–Present	Sofieland: The Bunker		

Hagen has also featured on other podcasts including:

- 2019 – Food Psych: #195: Why Fatphobia Hurts All of Us with Sofie Hagen
- 2024 – We Can Be Weirdos: #53 "I’m With Batsh*t —>: Sofie Hagen and the Troll of Shametown"

=== Radio ===
Year	Title	Role	Other Role	Channel	Notes	Ref
2013	BBC New Comedy Award	Self		BBC Radio 4	Episodes 1: "Heat 1", 9: "Wildcard Vote 2013"	
2014	BBC New Comedy Award	Self		BBC Radio 4	Episode 8: "London Heat 2"	
2014	Britain Versus The World	Guest		BBC Radio 4	Series 1, Episode 2	
2015	Fresh From The Fringe	Guest		BBC Radio 4	Episode 2	
2015	The Now Show	Self	Writer	BBC Radio 4	Series 47, Episode 4	
2017	The Museum Of Curiosity	Guest		BBC Radio 4	Gallery 10, Episode 4: "Meeting Fifty-Nine"	
2019	Sofie Hagen: How To Love Your Fat	Presenter	Writer	BBC Radio 4		
2019	The Arts Hour Holiday Comedy	Self		BBC World Service	Stand-up	
2019	Free Thinking: Anxiety	Self		BBC Radio 3		
2020	Mark Watson Talks A Bit About Life	Guest	Writer	BBC Radio 4	Episode 2: "Summer"	
2021	My Teenage Diary	Guest		BBC Radio 4	Series 10, Episode 5	
2024	Kiri's Comedy Club	Guest		BBC Radio Wales	Series 2, Episode 2; Series 3, Episode 3	

== Filmography ==
=== Television ===
Year	Title	Role	Other Role	Channel	Notes	Ref
2014	Alan Davies Après-Ski	Guest		BBC Two	Episode 1	
2015	Stand Up Central	Guest		Comedy Central	Series 1, Episode 3	
2016	Live From The BBC	Self		BBC Three	Series 1, Episode 5	
2016	Outsiders	Sofie	Writer (additional material)	Online	3 episodes	
2017	The Nightly Show	Guest		ITV	Episode 34	
2017	Ouch Storytelling Live XL: Awkward Moments	Host		BBC iPlayer		
2018	Roast Battle	Self		Comedy Central	Series 1, Episode 4	
2018	Comedy Central At The Comedy Store	Guest		Comedy Central	Series 5, Episode 4	
2018	Dave's Advent Calendar	Self		U&Dave	Episode 23	
2018	Sofie's Sex Stories	Host		Comedy Central (Online)	Never made	
2019	Comedy Central Live	Self	Writer	Comedy Central	Episode 3	
2020	Fat Chat	Guest		Comedy Central (Online)	Episode 3	
2023	OnlyFans Creative Fund: Comedy Edition	Host		Online	Episodes 1–3	

== Personal life ==
In December 2024, Hagen moved back to Denmark.

Hagen is also nonbinary, stating "My pronouns are whatever. She/they/he, whatever you want."
