= Varsity (Cambridge) =

Student newspaper at the University of Cambridge

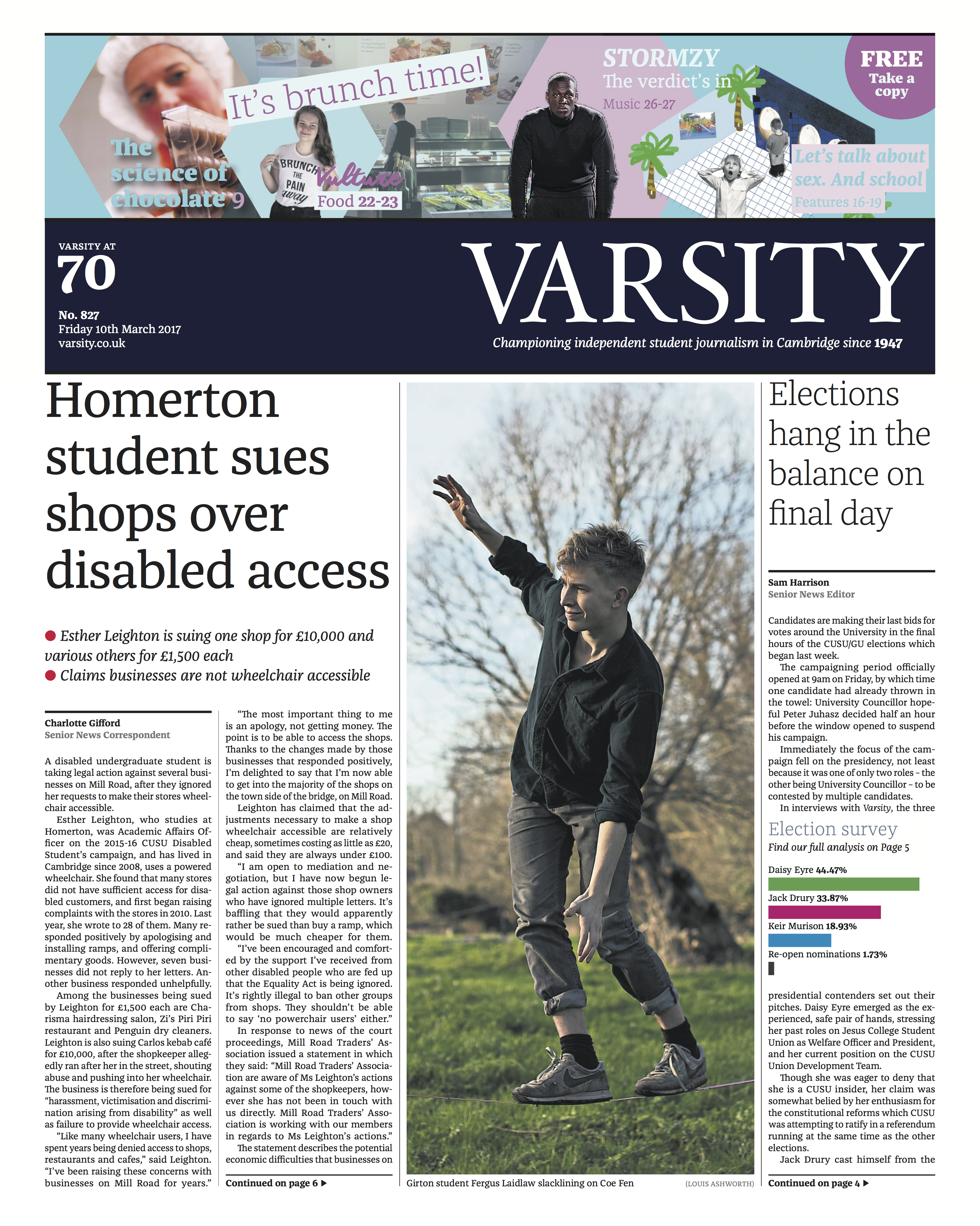
- Varsity issue 827
- Type: Weekly newspaper
- Format: Compact
- Owner: Varsity Publications Ltd
- Editor: Catherine Lally and Vivienne Hopley-Jones
- Founded: 1931; 95 years ago
- Headquarters: 16 Mill Lane, Cambridge, CB2 1RX
- Circulation: Up to 10,000
- ISSN: 1758-4442
- Website: www.varsity.co.uk

Varsity is the oldest of Cambridge University's main student newspapers. It has been published continuously since 1947 and is one of only three fully independent student newspapers in the UK. It moved back to being a weekly publication in Michaelmas 2015, and is published every Friday during term time.

Varsity has received recognition at the now defunct Guardian Student Media Awards.

== History ==
Varsity is one of Britain's oldest student newspapers. Its first edition was published on 17 January 1931, as Varsity: the Cambridge University Illustrated (later The Varsity Weekly, and then the Cambridge Varsity Post. However, the first few years saw Varsity get off to a shaky start. In 1932, a controversy about some of its stories resulted in the editor being challenged to a duel, and the following year the paper went bankrupt (having lost £100).

=== Revival ===
A variety of attempts to revive Varsity led to the paper resurfacing periodically over the following decade, but it was not until 1947 that the paper was re-established permanently in its current form. Harry Newman Jr (1921–2001), a graduate of Harvard University and Harvard Business School, then studying for a postgraduate degree at St John's College, Cambridge, decided that Cambridge needed a proper American-style campus newspaper modelled on The Harvard Crimson. With the post-war rationing of newsprint, only publications that had existed before the War could be allocated paper, and so the obsolete publication name Varsity was used.

In a letter published in Varsity at the end of the year 1971–1972, Harry Newman wrote,

Varsity began over a bottle of sherry in John's, matured over a bottle of port in Caius and blossomed with a firkin of ale over the Victoria Cinema, where we pecked out the first issue on trestle tables (without chairs). / Several of us—Bill Watson (Professor of Social Anthropology), David Widdicombe (distinguished Q.C.), John Noonan (American Professor of Canon Law), Dave Reece (Canadian Diplomat), Bill Howell (prominent architect), and Geoffrey Neame, among others—felt that what the University needed, in addition to its latest organisation, Y.A.S. (Yet Another Society), was an American-style college newspaper. ... It was truly an international effort, British (all three), Canadian, American, Hungarian, and Indian.

Varsity's headquarters in 1947 was above the Scotch Hoose, "a restaurant at the corner of the Market and Market Street". Newman goes on to note that Geoffrey Neame, "a leading light among the Nightclimbers of Cambridge and the Gentlemen of Caius", was the first post-1947 layout editor. The first managing editor was the Scotsman "Wee Willie Watson", a former fighter pilot. On 19 April 1947, Varsity reappeared, its first issue headlining the coming visit of the then Princess Elizabeth to the university (a visit that ultimately would be cancelled). Its first print run was of 5,000 copies.

=== 1950s–1960s ===
In the 1950s, Varsity's offices were in a former shop in St Edward's Passage, next door to the Arts Theatre. The second editor (after Newman) was David Widdicombe, a Queens' College student who was also chairman of the Labour Club. In 1955, a one-off Oxford edition of the paper was produced by the then editor Michael Winner. Since then the paper has concentrated on the Cambridge audience.

In 1956, the staff, worried about debts, questioned Varsity's legal status. Solicitors were consulted, who advised that any debts arising from its considerable turnover (advertising income, printing costs etc.) or damages awarded for libel etc. would be the personal responsibility of the current editor. Varsity was promptly converted into a limited liability company – "Varsity Publications Ltd", with a share capital of £100. 50% of the shares were taken by the printers, 20% by the Don who was the senior treasurer and the rest, at £1 per head, by the staff at that time.

=== 1970s–1980s ===
In the mid-1970s, Varsity merged with the radical campaigning student paper Stop Press. Thereafter, it was known as Stop Press with Varsity for several years, before reverting to its original title in the late 1980s.

=== 1990s–present ===
Varsity moved back to being a weekly publication in Michaelmas 2015, after having been a fortnightly publication since Michaelmas 2012. Varsity is published every Friday during the University of Cambridge's term time, so there are 21 issues a year.

The Lent term editor also edits a single edition at the start of Easter term, and a separate editor controls a special edition May Week issue (or, in some years, daily May Week issues) at the end of the academic year.

== Famous contributions ==
=== Notable contributors ===
Many of those who wrote for the paper during their student days have since gone on to achieve distinction in later life. Famous ex-editors include the former BBC news presenters Jeremy Paxman and David Frost, film director Michael Winner, the television presenter Richard Whiteley, former Financial Times editor Andrew Gowers, Independent editor Amol Rajan, i editor Oliver Duff, novelist Robert Harris, novelist and biographer Graham Lord, historian Jonathan Spence, Factory Records founder Tony Wilson and BBC1's EastEnders executive producer Matthew Robinson. International Herald Tribune fashion writer and author Suzy Menkes was the newspaper's first female editor. Some of Sylvia Plath's earliest poems and J. G. Ballard's first published story were written for the paper. Plath also posed in a bathing suit for an article she wrote about summer fashion-wear for the ladies. Meanwhile, comic Peter Cook met his first wife while posing for a Varsity May Ball photo shoot.

The paper has also launched the careers of many news journalists, including in recent times former Observer Political Editor Gaby Hinsliff, Guardian New York correspondent Oliver Burkeman, Guardian music critic Alexis Petridis, author and columnist Iain Hollingshead, Guardian columnist Archie Bland, Sunday Times columnist Charlotte Ivers, the Independent's New York business correspondent Stephen Foley, The Sunday Times News Review Editor Martin Hemming, as well as former Independent columnist Johann Hari. The BBC and Evening Standard reporter Andrew Gilligan was once a news editor. Other notable contributors who have had later success in other fields include Michael Frayn, Germaine Greer, Clive James, Gavin Lyall, Robert Jenrick and Charles III.

Some notable editors of the Varsity include Andrew Rawnsley (1983–4), Archie Bland (Michaelmas 2004), Amol Rajan (Lent 2005), Laura-Jane Foley (Lent 2004), and James Dacre (Michaelmas 2005).

Recent editors

Year	Term	Editor(s)
2026	Michaelmas	Daisy Bates and Bibi Boyce
2026	Easter	Ell Heeps
2026	Lent	Daisy Bates (Issue 1), Calum Murray (Issues 1-5), and Ellie Buckley (Issues 2-5)
2025	Michaelmas	Ben Curtis and Charlie Rowan
2025	Easter	Sophie Ennis and Anuk Weerawardana
2025	Lent	Sophie Denny and Wilf Vall
2024	Michaelmas	Alice Mainwood and Grace Cobb
2024	Easter	Alice Mainwood and Felix Armstrong
2024	Lent	Daniel Hilton and Michael Hennessey
2023	Michaelmas	Isabel Dempsey and Taneesha Datta
2023	Easter	Hannah Gillott and Erik Olsson
2023	Lent	Megan Byrom and Famke Veenstra-Ashmore
2022	Michaelmas	Fergal Jeffreys and Jacob Freedland
2022	Easter	Juliette Guéron-Gabrielle and Lotte Brundle
2022	Lent	Emaan Ullah and Bethan Moss
2021	Michaelmas	Nick Bartlett and Isabel Sebode
2021	Easter	Meike Leonard and Elizabeth Hagh
2021	Lent	Gaby Vides and Georgina Buckle
2020	Michaelmas	Rich Bartlett
2020	Easter	Caterina Bragoli and Gabriel Humphreys
2020	Lent	Lottie Reeder and Jess Ma
2019	Michaelmas	Maia Wyn Davies and Stephanie Stacey
2019	Easter	Isobel Bickersteth
2019	Lent	Vivienne Hopley-Jones and Catherine Lally
2018	Michaelmas	Noella Chye
2018	Easter	Anna Jennings
2018	Lent	Daniel Gayne
2017	Michaelmas	Elizabeth Howcroft and Patrick Wernham
2017	Easter	Patrick Wernham
2017	Lent	Millie Brierley
2016	Michaelmas	Louis Ashworth and Callum Hale-Thomson
2016	Easter	Eleanor Deeley
2016	Lent	James Sutton
2015	Michaelmas	Tom Freeman
2015	Lent	Talia Zybutz
2014	Michaelmas	Amy Hawkins
2014	Lent	Emily Chan
2013	Michaelmas	Alice Udale-Smith
2013	Lent	Salome Wagaine and Aliya Ram
2012	Michaelmas	Charlotte Keith
2012	Lent	Louise Benson and Madeleine Morley
2011	Michaelmas	Rhys Treharne and Laurie Martin
2011	Lent	Alice Hancock and Lara Prendergast
2010	Michaelmas	Joe Pitt-Rashid
2010	Lent	Emma Mustich and Laurie Tuffrey
2009	Michaelmas	Robert Peal and Anna Trench
2009	Lent	Hugo Gye and Michael Stothard
2008	Michaelmas	Patrick Kingsley
2008	Lent	Tom Bird and George Grist
2007	Michaelmas	Lizzie Mitchell and Elliot Ross
2007	Lent	Joseph Gosden and Hermione Buckland-Hoby (Issue 1), Joseph Gosden and Natalie Woolman (Issue 2–9)
2006	Michaelmas	Emily Stokes (Issues 1–2), Mary Bowers and Jonny Ensall (Issue 3–9)
2006	Lent	Jon Swaine and Amy Goodwin
2005	Michaelmas	James Dacre
2005	Lent	Amol Rajan
2004	Michaelmas	Archie Bland
2004	Lent	Reji Vettasseri and Laura-Jane Foley
2003	Michaelmas	Tom Ebbutt
2003	Lent	Oliver Duff and Luke Layfield
2002	Michaelmas	Katy Long
2002	Lent	Rob Sharp
2001	Michaelmas	Adam Joseph and Julian Blake
2001	Lent	Tom Royston and Sarah Brealey
2000	Michaelmas	Ed Hall
2000	Lent	Jonti Small
1999	Michaelmas	David Peter

=== Stories broken ===
==== Early years ====
Stories first revealed in Varsity have often gone on to receive coverage in the UK's national press. In May 1953, Varsity was only the third newspaper in the world to carry a report on James Watson and Francis Crick's discovery of the structure of DNA, after the News Chronicle and The New York Times. The discovery was made in Cambridge on 28 February 1953; the first Watson/Crick paper appeared in Nature on 25 April 1953. Sir Lawrence Bragg, the director of the Cavendish Laboratory, where Watson and Crick worked, gave a talk at Guy's Hospital Medical School in London on 14 May 1953 which resulted in an article by Ritchie Calder in the News Chronicle of London, on 15 May 1953, entitled "Why You Are You. Nearer Secret of Life." The news reached readers of The New York Times the next day; Victor K. McElheny, in researching his biography, "Watson and DNA: Making a Scientific Revolution", found a clipping of a six-paragraph New York Times article written from London and dated 16 May 1953 with the headline "Form of 'Life Unit' in Cell Is Scanned." The article only ran in an early edition and was then pulled to make space for news deemed more important. Varsity ran its own 130-word front-page article on the discovery on 30 May 1953 under the headline "X-Ray Discovery".

==== Recent years ====
In recent years, reports to capture wider attention have included the leak of the name of Cambridge's latest vice-Chancellor, news about student protests concerning higher education funding, and a host of lighter reports about undergraduate excesses. In 2014 Varsity collaborated with Cambridge's Students' Union to survey the rate of sexual assault at the university; the findings of the survey, attracted widespread attention from the national press.

In July 2021, Varsity broke a national story regarding the university's proposed £400m deal with the United Arab Emirates. Varsity journalists were then credited when the story was covered by The Times. The news was later broken that the deal had been called off following revelations around the UAE's links to Pegasus spyware through an interview with Vice-Chancellor Stephen Toope. The story appeared on the front cover of The Guardian, with Varsity journalists receiving writing credits.

== Current organisation ==
Varsity is published by Varsity Publications Ltd, a not-for-profit company which directly funds The Varsity Trust, a UK registered charity with the principal object of furthering the education of students in journalism. The company also produces a number of other student publications such as The Mays—a collection of short stories and poems by Cambridge and Oxford students. The Mays have been published annually since 1992, and are most famous for launching the career of novelist Zadie Smith. Her work appears in the 1996 and 1997 short-story editions. These attracted the attention of a publisher, who offered her a contract for her first novel. Smith decided to contact a literary agent and was taken on by A. P. Watt. Smith returned to guest-edit the anthology in 2001.

Advertising in Varsity has traditionally been seen as highly useful by graduate recruiters hoping to attract Cambridge students. As a result, the newspaper is able to distribute free copies to members of the university (without relying on student union funding), and was the first student newspaper in the UK to produce a colour section. Hence, Varsity's management and funding structure means that it is independent from both the university and Cambridge University Students' Union. In this respect it is unlike the vast majority of similar publications in other UK universities; the only other student newspapers to operate similarly are Oxford's Cherwell and The Oxford Blue, as well as The Saint of the University of St Andrews.

Unlike most student newspapers, the design of the newspaper is allowed to change radically with the arrival of new student editors.

== Awards ==
=== 20th century ===
For several consecutive years in the 1950s and 1960s the paper won the award for Britain's best student newspaper. (In the mid-1950s it was temporarily banned from entering for the award on grounds that it was "too professional" and other publications should be given a chance to win.)

=== 21st century ===
In the 2001 Guardian Student Media Awards it was shortlisted in two categories for best feature writer (Rend Shakir) and best student critic (Alex Marshall) It was successful in the 2004 Guardian Student Media Awards where it won the prize for best columnist (Archie Bland) and came runner-up in best sports writer category (Sam Richardson). In 2005 Varsity writer Sam Richardson won the Guardian's Student Diversity Writer of the Year award.

In 2006, Sophie Pickford was the runner-up for best sports writer of the year.

In 2007, Varsity won the Guardian Student Media Awards' Student Publication Design of the Year.

Varsity won six prizes at the Guardian Student Media Awards in November 2009, over a third of the prizes in session, was nominated for a further two, and former editor Patrick Kingsley was named Student Journalist of the Year. Michael Stothard won in the Best Reporter category; Zing Tsjeng was the Best Feature Writer; Ben Riley-Smith was Best Sports Reporter; while Charlotte Runcie was awarded Best Columnist, with Rob Peal runner-up.

== Current board and staff ==
Varsity has a board of directors made up of university academics, long-term associates of the newspaper, and student members. As of March 2022, the chairman is Mike Franklin.

Varsity's editors are not paid, but their work is supported by a full-time business manager and company secretary (responsible for sourcing advertising to fund the publications, running the office on a day-to-day basis, finance, accounts, tax and administration). The current business manager and company secretary is Mark Curtis.

Varsity is now based at the Old Examination Hall on the New Museums Site in the former Godwin Laboratory. Previously, Varsity was based at 11–12 Trumpington Street. The newspaper's move from this "temporary" home, to the new offices, occurred in August 2007, after a 16-year tenancy.
