= Oliver Burkeman =

British journalist (born 1975)

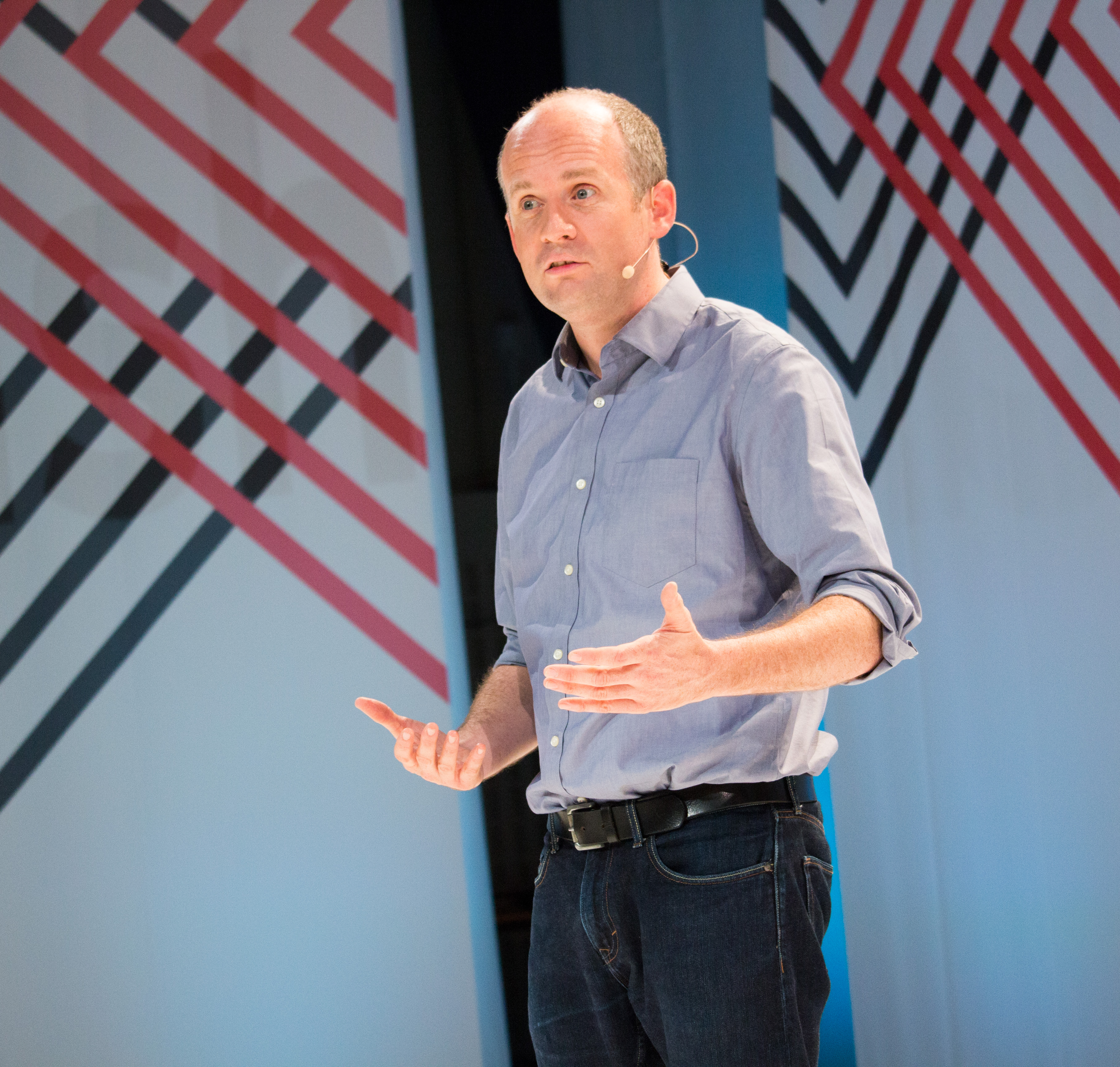
- Burkeman in 2015
- Born: 1975 (age 50–51); Liverpool, England
- Education: Huntington School, York
- Alma mater: University of Cambridge
- Occupations: Author and journalist
- Employer: The Guardian
- Known for: Four Thousand Weeks: Time Management for Mortals
- Website: www.oliverburkeman.com

Oliver Burkeman (born 1975) is a British author and journalist, formerly writing the weekly column This Column Will Change Your Life for the newspaper The Guardian. In 2021, he published Four Thousand Weeks: Time Management for Mortals, a self-help book on the philosophy and psychology of time management and happiness.

== Early life and education ==
Burkeman was educated at Huntington School, York, and the University of Cambridge. He was an undergraduate student at Christ’s College, Cambridge, and served as editor of the student newspaper Varsity. He graduated in 1994 with a degree in social and political sciences. While still in primary school, Burkeman wrote and distributed homemade one-page newsletters to his classmates.

== Career ==
Between 2006 and 2020, Burkeman wrote a popular weekly column on psychology, titled "This Column Will Change Your Life". He has reported from London, Washington and New York. Burkeman now produces the Imperfectionist newsletter.

=== Publications ===
Burkeman's published books include:

- HELP!: How to Become Slightly Happier and Get a Bit More Done
- The Antidote: Happiness for People Who Can't Stand Positive Thinking
- Four Thousand Weeks: Time Management for Mortals
- Meditations for Mortals: Four Weeks to Embrace Your Limitations and Make Time for What Counts

=== Awards and honours ===
Burkeman was shortlisted for the Orwell Prize in 2006. He won the "Young journalist of the year" award of the Foreign Press Association (FPA). In 2015, he won the Foreign Press Association's science story of the year for a piece on the mystery of consciousness.
