= David Widdicombe (barrister) =

British Queen's Counsel and political activist (1924–2019)

David Graham Widdicombe (7 January 1924 – 27 November 2019) was a British Queen's Counsel and political activist.

== Biography ==
Born in St Albans, Widdicombe attended St Albans School and then Queens' College, Cambridge. After one year at university, he was called up to serve in the British Army for the remainder of World War II.

At the 1945 UK general election, Widdicombe stood for the Labour Party in Hythe, aged just 21, taking 35.2% of the vote and second place. In 1946, he was demobbed and returned to Queens', where in 1947 he was a founder of the Varsity student newspaper, becoming its editor the following year. He also served as president of the Cambridge University Labour Club.

Widdicombe stood in Totnes, Devon, at the 1950 UK general election, taking 29.6% of the vote. One of his supporters during the campaign was Lee Kuan Yew, a friend of his from Cambridge, who would go on to become the first prime minister of Singapore, and a founding father of modern Singapore; for Lee, it was his first political campaign.

After graduation, Widdicombe qualified as a barrister with the Inner Temple, specialising in government administration. He became a Queen's Counsel, a recorder and a deputy High Court judge. He represented the London Borough of Bromley in the Fares Fair case, and chaired the enquiry that followed the homes for votes scandal.
