= Deborah Frances-White =

Australian-British comedian

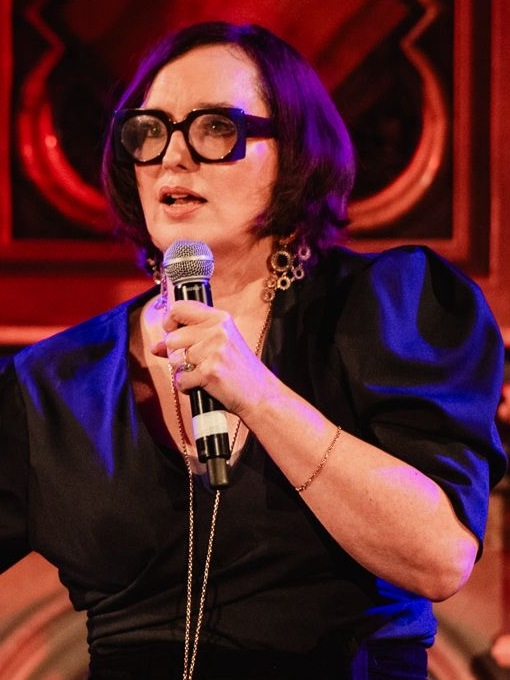
- Frances-White performing at a live recording of The Guilty Feminist at the Union Chapel, Islington on March 5, 2026
- Born: 10 December 1967 (age 58); Redcliffe, Queensland, Australia
- Education: Harris Manchester College, Oxford
- Notable work: The Guilty Feminist
- Spouse: Tom Salinsky

Comedy career
- Years active: 2007–present
- Medium: Stand-up, improvisation, Podcast
- Genres: Observational humour, Self-help, storytelling
- Subjects: Feminism, religion
- Website: www.guiltyfeminist.com

Deborah Frances-White (born 10 December 1967) is a London-based comedian, author and screenwriter. She has both British and Australian citizenship. She hosts the podcasts Global Pillage and The Guilty Feminist. She wrote the 2018 comedy film Say My Name.

== Early life ==
Frances-White was born in Australia and adopted at ten days old. She grew up in Brisbane, Queensland. Her family converted to Jehovah’s Witnesses when she was a teenager; Frances-White has since left the community and describes herself as an atheist. Her years in the denomination and how she left it were the focus of her 2012 Edinburgh Fringe stand-up comedy show and two of the episodes of her BBC Radio 4 show Deborah Frances-White Rolls the Dice.

During her gap year, she moved to London and later studied English at Oxford University.

== Career ==
Frances-White is one of three directors at the improv theatre company The Spontaneity Shop, which she co-founded with Tom Salinsky in 1996. After developing a number of improvisation formats at The Spontaneity Shop (including the improvised romantic comedy DreamDate which had a pilot made for ITV), Frances-White turned to stand-up comedy. Her first significant solo show was How to Get Almost Anyone to Want to Sleep With You which she performed at The Edinburgh Festival Fringe in 2007 and at The Melbourne International Comedy Festival in 2008 where she also hosted The Melbourne International Comedy Festival Roadshow.

Frances-White's recent shows have been more personal. Cult Following (2012) dealt with her experiences as a teenage Jehovah's Witness, Half a Can of Worms (2013) was about tracking down her biological family and Friend of a Friend of Dorothy (2015) was about feminism, sexism and homophobia.

Frances-White has continued to develop new improvisation formats. Voices in Your Head is a show which allows comedians, improvisers and actors to create comedy characters while the audience watches. Guests have included Phill Jupitus, Sara Pascoe, Russell Tovey, Mike McShane and Hannibal Buress. In 2015 she created The Beau Zeaux a long-form improvised comedy featuring a rotating cast including Marcus Brigstocke, Thom Tuck, Rachel Parris, Brendan Murphy, Ed Coleman, Milly Thomas and Pippa Evans. Guests have included Russell Tovey and Dan Starkey.

Her BBC Radio 4 series Deborah Frances-White Rolls the Dice was first broadcast in spring 2015 and featured stories about her adoption, green card marriage, and the quest to find her biological family. The episodes were titled "Half a Can of Worms", "Cult Following", "Visa Issues" and "Who's Your Daddy"? In January 2016, the show won Frances-White the Writers' Guild of Great Britain award for "Best Radio Comedy". A second series was first broadcast in autumn 2016.

On television, Frances-White has appeared as a guest on Mock the Week, Politics Live and Tonight With Vladimir Putin.

With Sofie Hagen, she created the podcast The Guilty Feminist. She is also the creator and host of the podcast Global Pillage, a long running comedy panel show that blends comedy, intersectional feminism and politics. In 2019, The Guilty Feminist and Amnesty International joined forces for the Secret Policeman’s Tour, consisting of three shows with comedy, music and discussion, all in support of human rights. In 2023, The Guilty Feminist also launched Media Storm, a news podcast hosted by journalists Mathilda Mallinson and Helena Wadia. Deborah also created and hosted the intersectional comedy panel show Global Pillage, which pits teams of comedians and commentators against each other and the hive mind of the audience.

== Corporate work ==
Frances-White regularly appears at corporate events speaking about confidence, charisma, diversity and sexism. Her TEDx talk on Charisma vs Stage-Fright was cited by James Caan as the secret of his presenting skills.

== Writing ==
With her writing partner Philippa Waller, Frances-White contributed two episodes of Young Dracula in 2014. She has co-written two books: The Improv Handbook with Tom Salinsky and Off the Mic with Marsha Shandur, both published by Bloomsbury. She writes for Standard Issue Magazine. In 2018, Virago Press published The Guilty Feminist, a spin-off from her podcast. Her debut feature film, the comedy thriller Say My Name, premiered on 19 March 2019. In April, 2025 her book Six Conversations We're Scared To Have came out.
