= Say My Name (film) =

2018 comedy film

- Film poster
- Directed by: Jay Stern
- Written by: Deborah Frances-White
- Starring: Lisa Brenner; Nick Blood; Mark Bonnar
- Release date: 14 October 2018

Say My Name is a 2018 comedy film directed by Jay Stern and written by Deborah Frances-White. It starred Lisa Brenner, Nick Blood and Mark Bonnar and was released on 14 October 2018 at the Liverpool International Film Festival.

== Cast ==
- Lisa Brenner as Mary Page
- Nick Blood as Statton Taylor
- Celyn Jones as Kipper Jones
- Mark Bonnar as Dec
- Alan Cox as Father Donald Davies
- Peter Davison as Rich Herbig
- Jamie de Courcey as Officer Sedgwick

== Release ==
The film was released on 14 October 2018 at the Liverpool International Film Festival.
