= Charlotte Ivers =

British journalist (born 1995)

- Born: 1 March 1995 (age 31); England
- Education: Pembroke College, Cambridge
- Occupation: Journalist
- Years active: 2013–present
- Employer: The Sunday Times

Charlotte Ivers (born 1 March 1995) is a British journalist. She was the restaurant critic for The Sunday Times until she was replaced by Camilla Long on 8 February 2026, having previously been a political correspondent at Times Radio.

== Early life ==
Born in 1995, Ivers sees herself as both English and Scottish:

I was born in England. I was educated in England. I have an English accent. To any impartial observer, I am English. However, my family live in a small town just outside of Glasgow. I have four sisters and a stepmother who are all indisputably Scottish. My father has an English accent, but has lived on the west coast of Scotland for as long as I can remember. When I talk about visiting them, I talk about going home.

She attended Dean Close School, a private boarding school in Gloucestershire. She was head of school and commanded the RAF section of the school's Combined Cadet Force.

She studied philosophy at Pembroke College, Cambridge. While there, she wrote for Varsity and The Tab, and was elected president of the Cambridge Union.

== Career ==
Ivers worked as a special adviser for Theresa May's government.

She was a political correspondent at Times Radio and is currently a columnist for The Sunday Times.

Ivers has made television appearances on Question Time and Have I Got News for You.

== Personal life ==
She was formerly in a relationship with Conservative MP Richard Holden; they started dating in November 2016 when both were working as special advisers. She subsequently partnered with Sunday Times colleague Josh Glancy. Charlotte Ivers married Josh Glancy on 12 February 2026 at Islington Town Hall. The wedding was announced in The Times on 13 February. https://x.com/i/status/2022306902315569487
