= The Spontaneity Shop =

The Spontaneity Shop is an improvisational comedy company formed in London in 1996. They base their work around the teachings of Keith Johnstone and have developed several original improvisation forms.

== History ==
The Spontaneity Shop, then known as The Old Spontaneity Shop was formed in 1996 by Tom Salinsky and Deborah Frances-White. Their first shows were at the Troubadour Coffee House in Earl's Court, and they moved to the Canal Cafe in 1999. From 1998-2000 they also ran shows and workshops at Oxford University.

In 1999 they presented a benefit concert at The Hackney Empire, directed by Keith Johnstone and Improbable theatre's Phelim McDermott. Joining the Spontaneity Shop cast were Tony Slattery, Jonathan Pryce, Lee Simpson, Neil Mullarkey and a number of other special guests. The money raised went to the Royal Court Theatre where Keith had once worked as a director.

In 2000 the company created DreamDate, the improvised romantic comedy which was a hit at the Edinburgh Fringe. Hat Trick Productions, producer Dan Patterson and most recently Pozzitive Television have all attempted to get TV versions made but none has yet got past the pilot stage. Recently, the company sold the international rights to FremantleMedia who are currently trying to launch it in the United States.

The company also developed the long form structure Tell Tales which presents a complete improvised play entirely in monologues.
