= Cambridge University Labour Club =

Student political society

- Abbreviation: CULC
- Predecessor: Cambridge University Fabian Society
- Formation: 1900
- Type: Student political society
- Location: Cambridge
- Co-Chairs: Oscar Paulson, Caius and Martha Lucas, Queens
- Parent organisation: Labour Party
- Website: Official website
- Formerly called: Cambridge University Fabian Society

The Cambridge University Labour Club (CULC), formerly known as Cambridge Universities Labour Club, is a student political society, first founded as the Cambridge University Fabian Society, intended to provide a voice for the British Labour Party at the University of Cambridge. Serving as the largest student Labour society in Britain, it has gained recognition as an active campaigning force in the labour movement. Its fellow political societies are the Cambridge University Liberal Association and the Cambridge University Conservative Association.

In recent years, the club has hosted a number of high-profile figures including former leaders Ed Miliband, Neil Kinnock and Gordon Brown, as well as former Welsh first minister, Mark Drakeford. Other speakers have included Angela Eagle, Harriet Harman, Hazel Blears, David Miliband, Margaret Hodge, Ed Balls, John Prescott, Tristram Hunt, Alan Johnson, Andy Burnham, Iain McNicol, David Lammy, Hilary Benn, Axelle Lemaire and Ken Livingstone.

== History ==
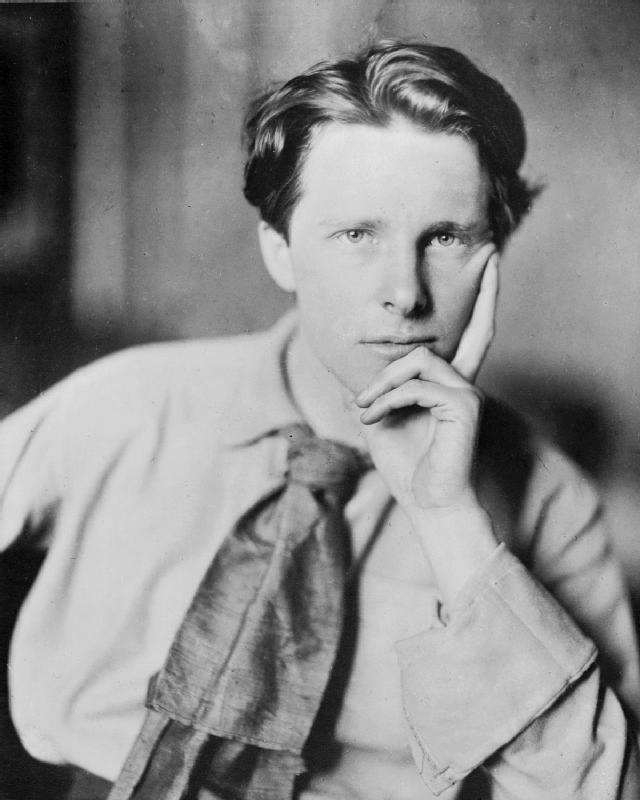
English Poet, Rupert Brooke, was President of the society from 1909 to 1910.

CULC has gone through several name changes. The society it began as an offshoot of was founded as the Cambridge University Fabian Society in 1900, and then changed its name in June 1915 to Cambridge University Socialist Society (which retained a separate Fabian Society within it), dedicated to "complete political and industrial democracy... [and] supersession of the capitalist system". It then changed its name to Cambridge University Labour Club in the late 1910s, before reverting to being the C.U. Socialist Society at the end of the decade.

=== Cambridge University Socialist Society (1915–1920) ===
Between 1918 and 1920 CUSS was the only society in which socialists could meet. Through study circles, investigations, speakers, and joint action with the Cambridge Labour Party, CUSS sought 'the realisation of complete political and industrial democracy' and 'the supersession of the capitalist system by a co-operative commonwealth' using common ownership if land and industry. Its key concerns were the Labour Party programme, the land question, the Russian Revolution, German socialism, syndicalism, and American socialism. It continued to debate with the local party and invited such speakers as G. D. H. Cole, Bertrand Russell, George Bernard Shaw, and J. C. Squire.

Most importantly, CUSS was pacifist. Affiliated to the No-Conscription Fellowship, it vehemently opposed military training in schools. But such activity was dangerous. On 7 March 1919 a meeting was broken up and three members were forced to stand on a table and sing the national anthem before being dunked in the river by a group of veterans. Maurice Dobb, the socialist economist, would experience the same treatment, and in 1922 CULC would be forced to relocate its premises due to its landlord's fear of attacks. A proposed meeting with the local party in March 1919 had to be cancelled as a crowd of hostile demonstrators occupied the Friends' Meeting House and began to sing. The result was that the university's Liberals and Conservatives refused to co-operate with their socialist counterparts throughout the 1920s.

=== Cambridge University Labour Club (1920–1973) ===
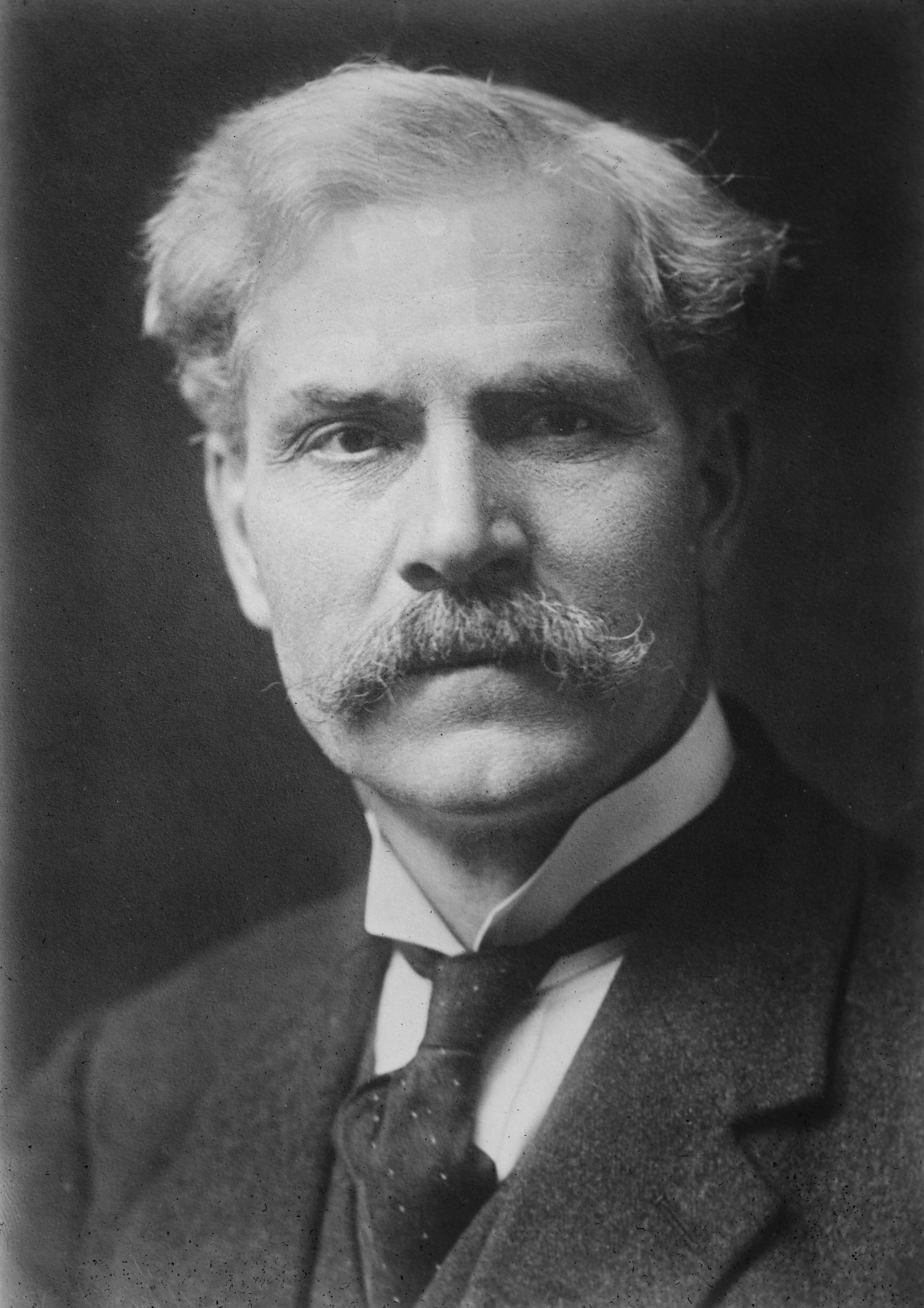
Ramsay MacDonald addressed the society in May 1925.

==== 1920s–1940s ====
The national rise of the Labour Party seems to have provoked undergraduates to create their own Labour Club at the end of the 1910s. This was partly motivated by 'a considerable number of the present associates, who were not satisfied with the extremism' of CUSS and by a decline in the attendance and frequency of meetings, perhaps owing to the widespread intimidation of socialists.

On 14 April 1920 CULC was duly formed. As a direct result members of CUSS resolved to become a study circle within the Labour Club. To maintain its distinctive identity Maurice Dobb proposed that CUSS 'should hold meetings with speakers too "red" for the Labour Club, but, by some strange jugglery, under Labour Club auspices – particularly financial auspices'. It certainly retained a more radical position than most CULC members, remaining committed to 'common ownership', 'workers' control', and building a 'revolutionary working-class movement'. Of all the 'red' speakers it invited, the most prominent was Leonid Krasin of the USSR, the People's Commissar of Foreign Trade, who could not attend in 1922 owing to the Geneva Conference. Nonetheless, they were addressed by Hugh Dalton on foreign policy, Harold Laski, Dobb, and Russell.

But with no meetings held at all between November 1923 and January 1925, it seems that the reasons for the formation of CULC had resonated with University socialists. Indeed, on 8 May 1925 Dobb proposed that CUSS be organised as a society which supported the Labour Research Department, or perhaps trained teachers for the Plebs League or the Labour Colleges, or worked with local minority movements: as 'a body doing definite work', it might then retain some popularity and relevance.

CULC attracted a wide array of prominent speakers. Beginning in 1920 with Fred Bramley, Assistant General Secretary of the TUC, it was soon visited by the MPs J. C. Wedgwood, Margaret Bondfield, Ramsay MacDonald, and Ellen Wilkinson; and the academics Raymond Postgate, Joseph Needham, Harold Laski, Bertrand Russell, R. H. Tawney, and many others. From MacDonald's visit in 1925, half of all profits (equating to nearly £15) were sent to the strikers in Shepreth. CULC was also close to the Cambridge Labour Party, gaining the attendance of Cllr William Briggs, Hugh Dalton, Cllr Clara Rackham, and Alec Firth. More broadly, the Club organised summer schools with the University Labour Federation (ULF), ran a library, held Sunday teas, and ran research committees. Perhaps CULC was a little too assiduous in its political education and canvassing: in January 1922 it was forced to move its premises as the landlord refused to renew the club's lease 'on the grounds that the Club did not drink enough beer'.

Despite its exposed left flank CULC grew rapidly and became the largest student political society by the late 1920s. By 1924 there were around 100 paying members and in 1925 David Hardman was elected as the first ever socialist President of the Cambridge Union Society; two CULC members, A L Hutchinson and the future educationalist Lionel Elvin, would succeed him. CULC would play an important role in campaigning in the town. They participated in the campaigns for the parliamentary elections in 1922, 1923, and 1924. The last of those elections saw CULC make a special effort in the county Labour Party. But it was the selection of Hardman which truly motivated members. They began canvassing for Hardman in 1927 and organising socials with college workers and trade union gatherings for him. They were also entrusted to organise the entire campaign in Castle, a ward which covered most of the areas of the present-day Newnham and Castle wards.

However, CULC would soon run into its own political difficulties. The political divisions among members were made clear as the club changed its name to Cambridge University Labour Society in 1927 and Cambridge University Labour and Socialist Club in 1928. As the national party confronted the divide created by the leadership's response to the financial crisis in 1929, CULC 'feeling unwilling to tie itself officially to an apology for a Labour Government whose record it did not greatly admire', changed its name to Cambridge University Socialist Society and disaffiliated from the national Labour Party in 1930. But it had a home in Cambridge; its economic position was shared by most members of the local party and, crucially, Alex Wood. CULC thus continued to campaign for local Labour candidates. But its new rules allowed Communists and other socialists to join and it soon fell under the control of the former.

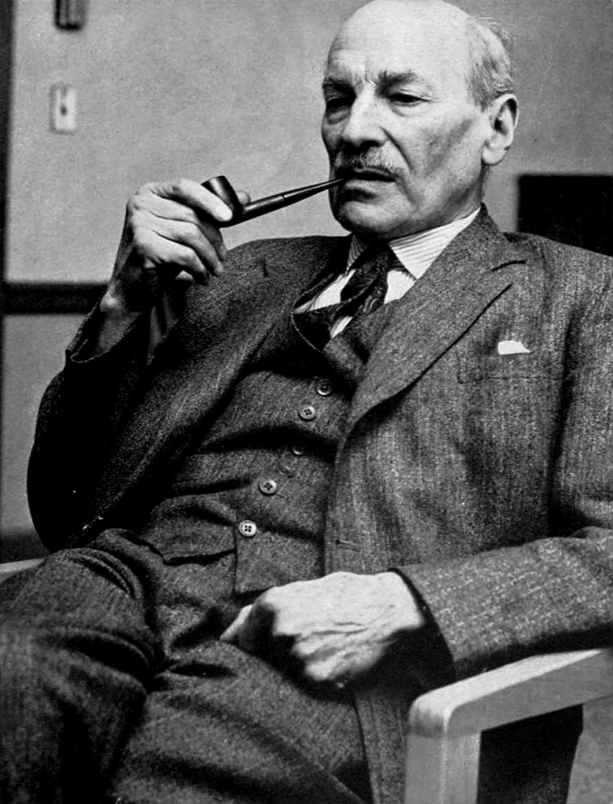
Clement Attlee addressed the society on numerous occasions throughout the 1930s and 40s.

In the 1930s, the club now known as CUSC (Cambridge University Socialist Club) took the pacifist case extremely seriously, producing a pamphlet entitled "Conscription for Britain?" in 1938 which attacked the government for abandoning collective security. It was on this basis that CUSC also opposed the policy of appeasement. Their commitment to pacifism brought danger to the university's socialists: in March 1938 their rooms were raided and slogans in support of Franco were scratched on the walls of one room, while a speech by Clement Attlee to CUSC in the Corn Exchange was interrupted by fireworks. In December 1939, a new form of CULC was founded for those whose opinions sat closer to the national Labour Party than CUSC with regard to war.

During the war, the ongoing activity of CULC seemed to have failed to inspire an undergraduate population whose enthusiasm for socialism was mostly lukewarm. In October 1941 CULC began a periodical entitled the Labour Club Review. One edition from November 1941 carried an editorial which praised socialism as 'a faith to fight for'. 'Successful and well-established movements always tend to lose their early fire', the editor commented. 'Now parents no longer protest when their elder sons join the Labour Party. The Party has become "His Majesty's Government." As its numbers have grown, its belief has weakened and almost all former fervour has been lost'. It seemed that the combination of the party's long period of opposition during the 1930s following the crippling divide of the financial crisis, combined with the need to focus on the war over and above ideological concerns, had dampened undergraduate enthusiasm for the Labour Party during the early 1940s. Although CULC organised speakers' events, dance classes, grand balls, and training classes, it seemed that in the Labour Party, 'official leadership, rigid party organisation, and the difficulties of coalition government' had 'done much to dampen enthusiasm'.

==== Post-WWII period ====
During the late 1940s CULC then suffered from declining public confidence in the government. One member, David Widdicombe, wrote an article entitled 'Against Ignorance' in the Labour Review in which he argued that the government was failing to explain its programme to the people. He suggested that party members and MPs should 'give the flesh of ideal to the bare bones of legislation, to show towards what type of community we are progressing' and to replace 'doctrinaire socialist economic theory' with arguments based on 'efficiency and the common good'. Practising as he preached, he proposed to set up special Sunday discussion groups open to all; they would be informal and, crucially, he was 'in favour of tea and buns'. For Widdicombe, the view that CULC was 'an instrument of research is overemphasised and founded on the fallacy that we know something others don't'.

As it had always done, CULC took an active role in politics outside of the university. One such instance was a sympathy strike in 1946 held in Cambridge in support of lorry drivers in Smithfield. Although only five workers turned out in Cambridge, CULC members argued successfully that the press had exaggerated how much lorry drivers in Smithfield were paid. On another occasion a young Peter Shore, the future cabinet minister, led a protest against the Cambridge Conservatives as they held their gala evening with the parliamentary candidate Hamilton Kerr and R. A. "Rab" Butler. Their greatest achievement that evening was to drown out the Conservatives' chorus of the first verse of the national anthem.

In the late 1960s, the club was split among a number of factions. CULC was seen as an umbrella organisation for the Left, including within it a Socialist Society and a Marxist Society. Members of the committee, however, were usually Labour Party members. The Right of the Labour Party, which was largely associated with the Fabian Society, broke off in Easter Term 1967 and formed the Democratic Labour Club, which forbade its members to be part of any other political society. The Cambridge Democratic Labour Club was immediately recognised by the national Labour Party at Transport House, with the Labour Club no longer recognised by the national party. Accusations of electoral malpractice were traded between the two, in what CULC's Senior Treasurer Prof Bernard Williams described as "a disagreeable and seedy affair." Also active until at least the 1960s was 'SocSoc' or the Cambridge University Socialist Society.

Ultimately, the Cambridge Organisation of Labour Students (COLS) was formed in the summer of 1973 as a replacement for the faction-ridden CULC. It readopted the name Cambridge University Labour Club around 2000 and changed to its current name again in 2007 to Cambridge Universities Labour Club to reflect the opening up of membership. The Club reverted to Cambridge University Labour Club in 2018 following the establishment of Anglia Ruskin University's own Labour Society.

== Constitution and organisation ==
CULC is run by an elected executive committee. The current co-chairs are Ophelia Wye and Ben Cartwright, of Clare and Christ's College respectively. The club also has Professor Nick Gay, of Christ's College, as its Senior Treasurer. The club also holds Annual General Meetings and Termly General Meetings at which its members can pass policy in the form of motions (such as supporting the Living Wage Campaign), and hear reports from the executive officers.

=== Membership ===
Historically membership of the society had been open only to students of the University of Cambridge. In 2007 a constitutional amendment was made, opening up membership to students of Anglia Ruskin University also. In recognition of this fact, the name of the society was changed to Cambridge Universities Labour Club. In 2012 CULC elected its first Anglia Ruskin member to the executive committee. The membership is now exclusive to members of the University of Cambridge following the establishment of Anglia Ruskin University's own Labour Society

=== Acronym ===
The acronym CULC had historically belonged to the Cambridge University Liberal Club, before they became the Cambridge Student Liberal Democrats in 1988, and the acronym is still shared to this day with the Cambridge University Lacrosse Club.

== Criticisms ==
The Cambridge Universities Labour Club is independent from, but affiliated to the national Labour Party. It has caused controversy at times by making criticisms of the Cambridge University Conservative Association (CUCA) and Cambridge University for being excessively elitist and dedicated to preserving the image of antiquated class distinctions. CUCA has responded denying these claims, arguing that CULC has misconceived CUCA.

== Notable former members ==
CULC and its other various manifestations have produced a number of notable alumni.

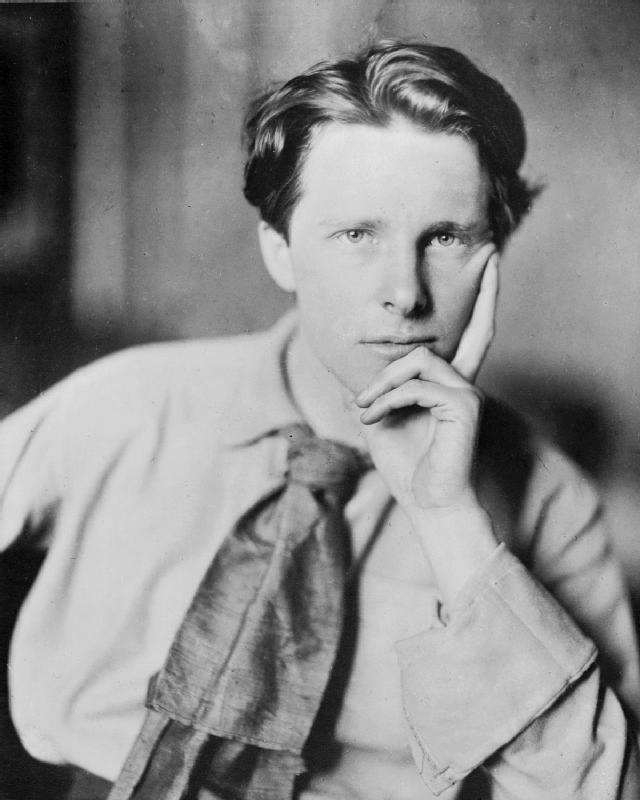
Rupert Brooke, English poet

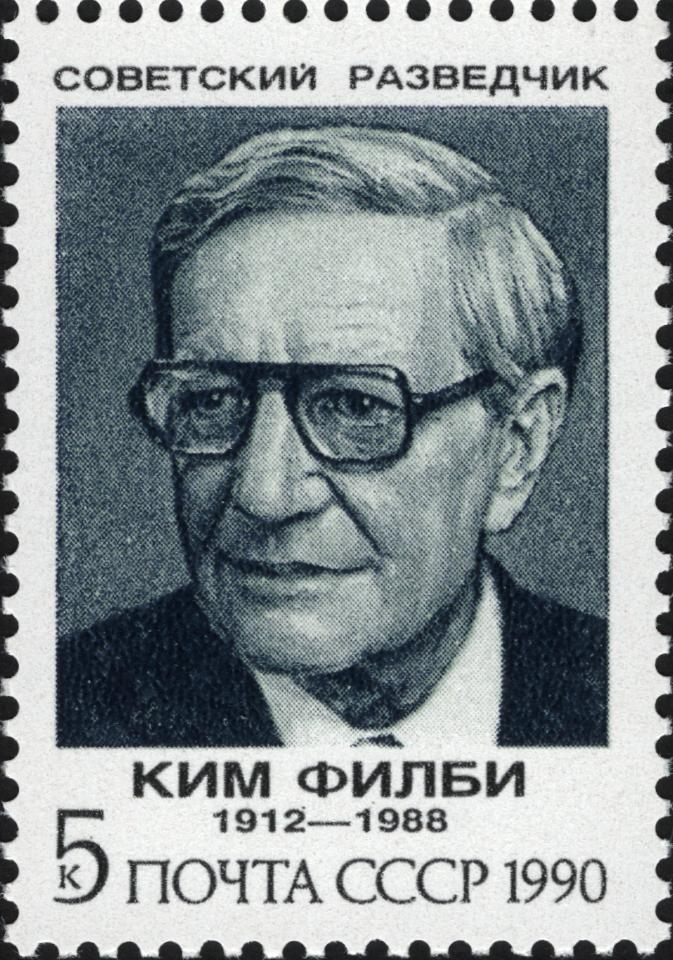
Kim Philby, Soviet spy

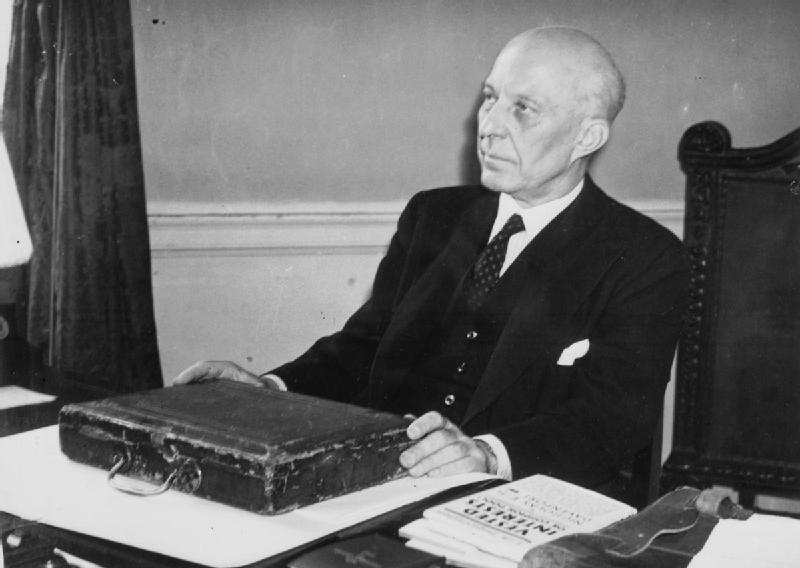
Lord Dalton, Chancellor of the Exchequer.

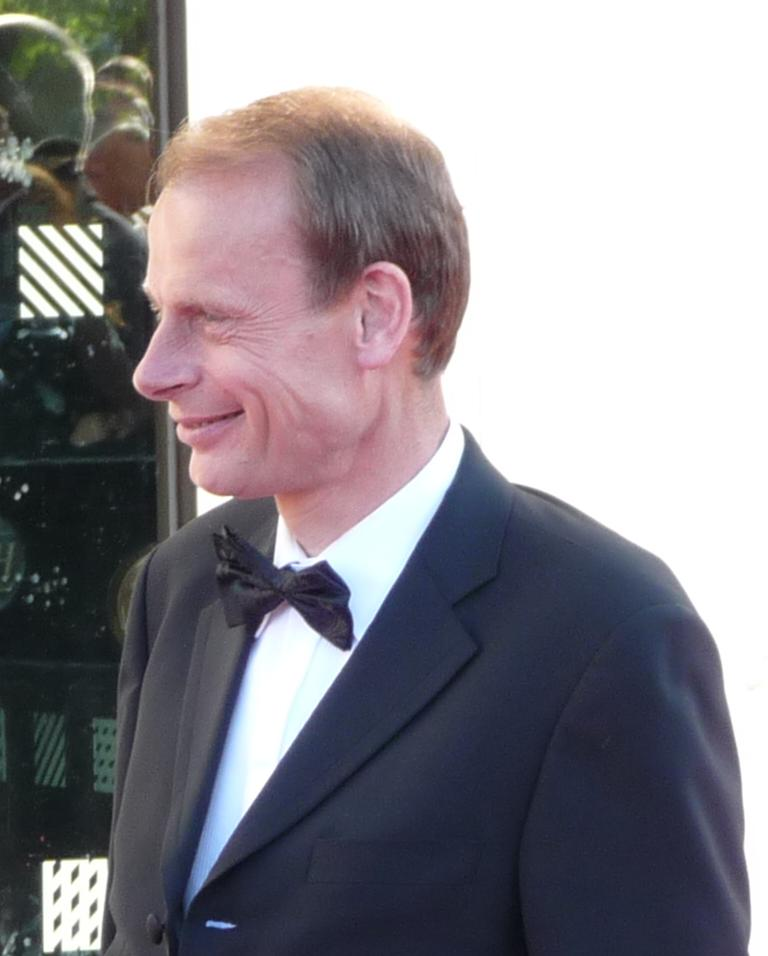
Andrew Marr, BBC journalist

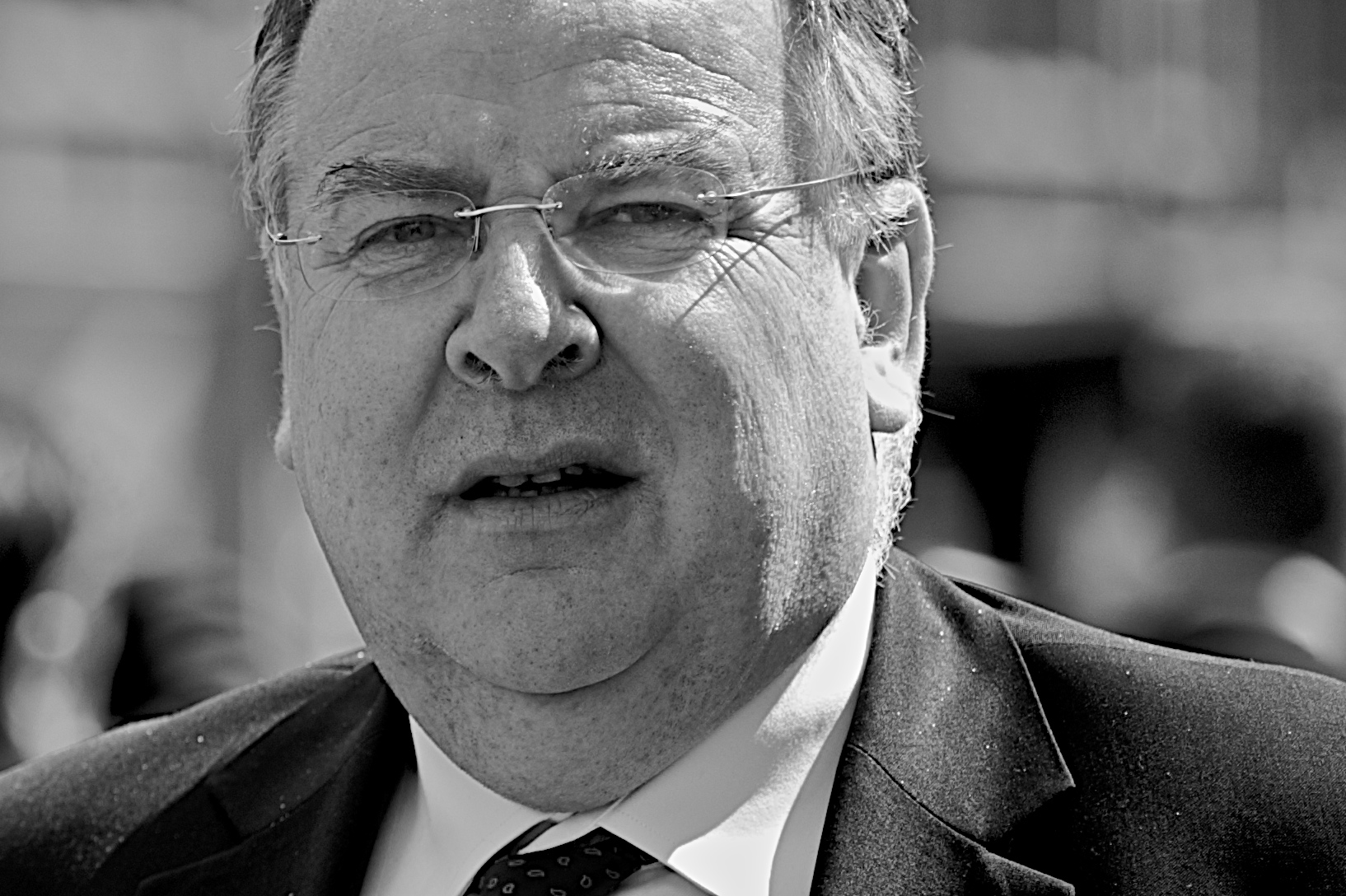
Charles Falconer, Lord Chancellor

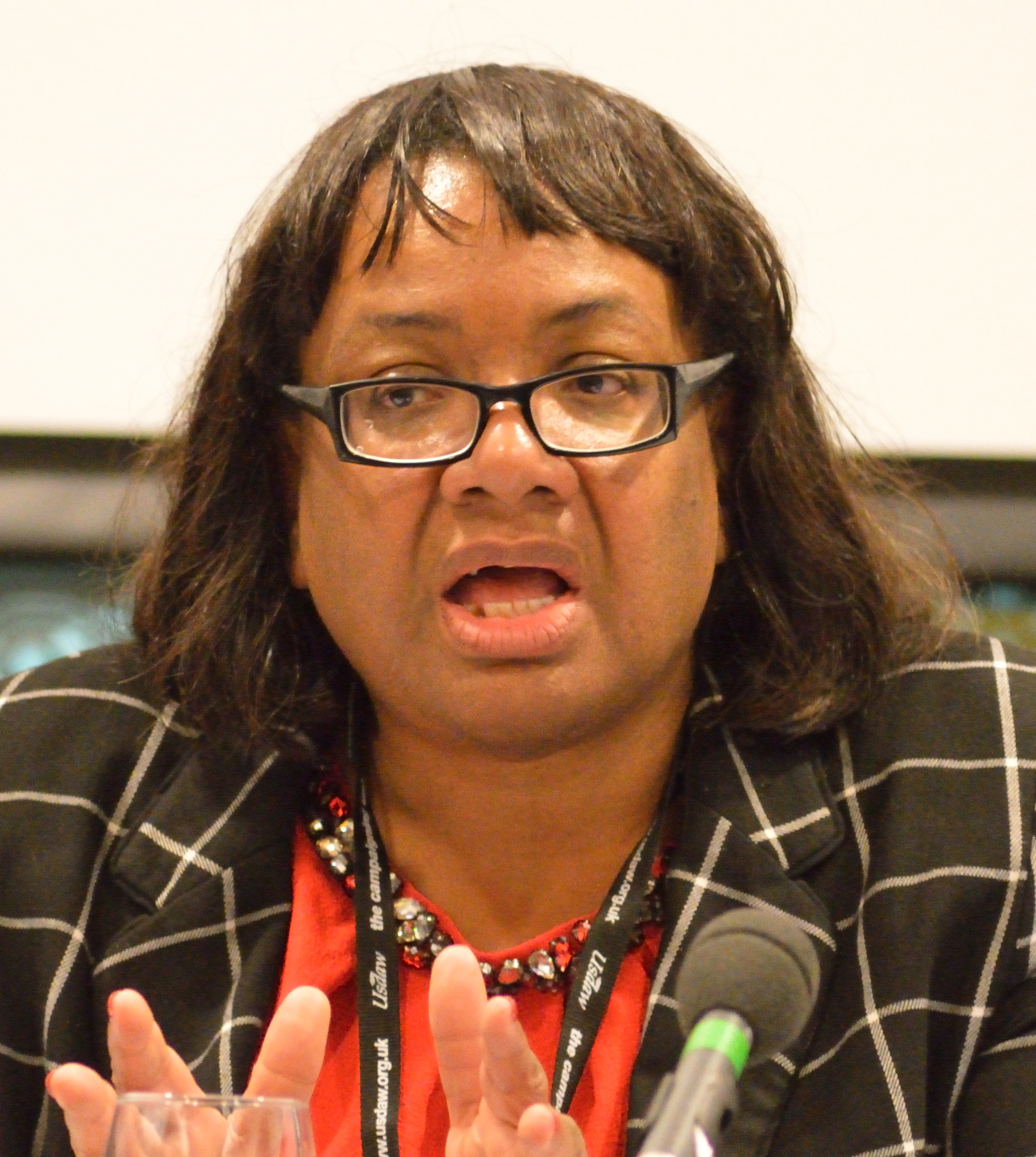
Diane Abbott, MP and former Shadow Home Secretary

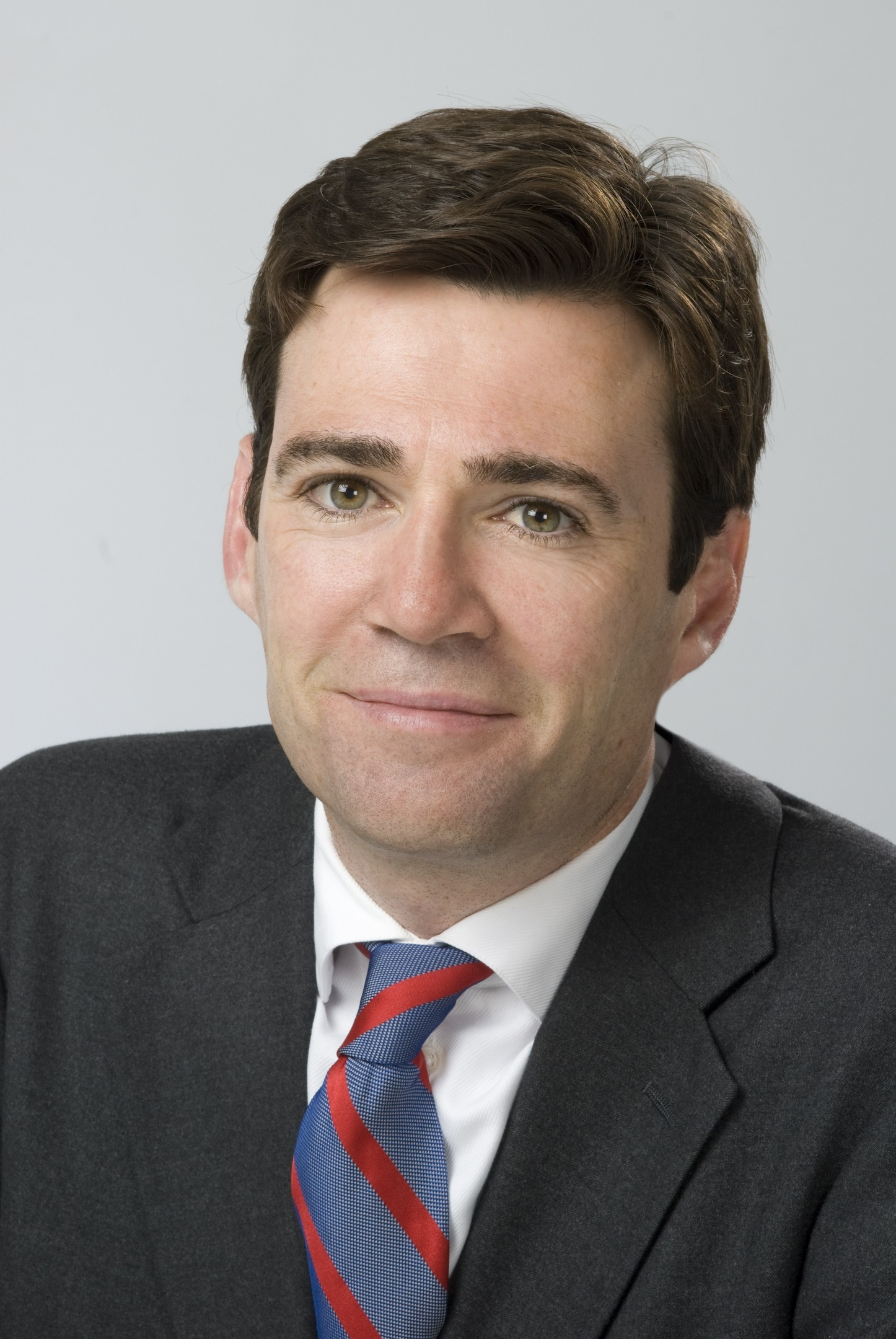
Andy Burnham, Prime Minister and former Mayor of Greater Manchester

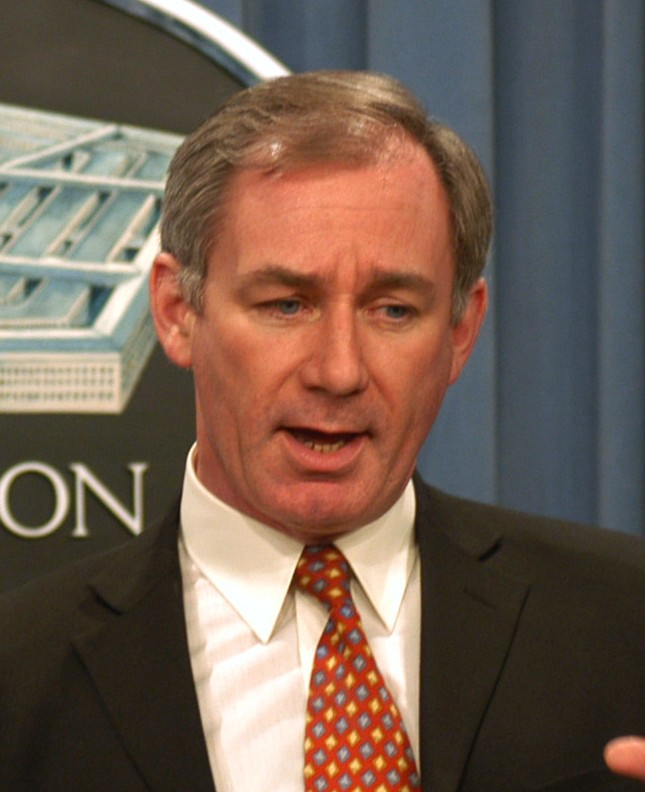
Geoff Hoon, Secretary of State for Defence

=== Academics ===
- Mary Beard, Professor of Classics
- Cyril Bibby, biologist and sexologist
- Andrew Gamble, Professor of Politics
- Stephen Mennell, Professor of Sociology
- Vernon Henry Mottram, CU Fabian Society founding President 1905, physiologist and nutritionist
- John Skorupski, noted academic famous for his work on John Stuart Mill

=== Civil servants ===
- Brian Barder, former diplomat.

=== Journalists ===
- Andrew Gilligan
- Simon Hoggart, wrote for CULC's magazine Spartacus
- Paul Lewis, The Guardian journalist
- Andrew Marr, BBC political correspondent

=== Lords ===
- Lord Allen, CU Fabian Society Chairman 1910
- Professor Lord Eatwell, special advisor to Neil Kinnock and Ed Miliband and President of Queens' College
- Charles Falconer, Lord Chancellor and QC
- Derry Irvine, Lord Chancellor

=== MPs ===
- Diane Abbott, MP and Shadow Home Secretary
- Clive Betts, MP
- Richard Burgon, MP
- Andy Burnham, MP, Prime Minister of the United Kingdom, former Mayor of Greater Manchester and former Secretary of State for Health
- Charles Clarke, former MP and Home Secretary; elected President of the Cambridge Students' Union on a Labour party slate
- Stella Creasy, MP
- Hugh Dalton, MP, Chancellor of the Exchequer, 1947–50
- George Darling, MP, Minister of State at the Board of Trade, 1964–68, and later Lord Darling of Hillsborough
- Mike Gapes, MP
- David Hardman, first Labour President of the Cambridge Union in 1925, MP
- Arthur Henderson, Baron Rowley, MP, peer, son of Labour Party leader Arthur Henderson
- Patricia Hewitt, MP, former Secretary of State for Health
- Geoff Hoon, MP, Secretary of State for Defence
- Tristram Hunt, MP, historian
- Greville Janner, MP and President of the Board of Deputies of British Jews
- Francis Noel-Baker, MP
- Peter Shore, CULC Chairman, MP and cabinet minister
- Angela Smith, MP
- Chris Smith MP, Secretary of State for Culture, Media and Sport.
- Leslie Symonds, the first Labour MP for Cambridge (1945–50)
- Sam Carling, MP and Baby of the House
- Chris Hinchliff, MP

=== Poets and writers ===
- Rupert Brooke, CU Fabian Society President 1909, poet
- F. M. Cornford, CU Fabian Society committee member 1910, classical scholar
- Carey Harrison, novelist and dramatist
- Sylvia Plath, poet and novelist
- Amber Reeves, CU Fabian Society committee member 1907, feminist writer
- J. C. Squire, CU Fabian Society founding committee member 1905, poet, writer, historian
- Alan Watkins, political columnist

=== Other ===
- Kim Philby, Soviet spy
- Andrew Harrop, incumbent Chair of the Fabian Society

It has been reported that when the young Charles III was a student at Trinity College, Cambridge in the 1960s, he attempted to join the Labour Club, but was warned against doing so by the Master of Trinity, former Conservative politician R. A. Butler.

== See also ==
- Cambridge University Conservative Association
- Cambridge University Liberal Association
- Oxford University Labour Club
