= Four Thousand Weeks: Time Management for Mortals =

2021 self-help book about time management by Oliver Burkeman

- Author: Oliver Burkeman
- Audio read by: Oliver Burkeman
- Language: English
- Subject: Time management; Philosophy; Self-help; Happiness
- Genre: Self-help
- Publisher: Farrar, Straus and Giroux
- Publication date: 10 August 2021
- Publication place: U.S.
- Media type: Print (hardcover, softcover), audio
- Pages: 288
- ISBN: 978-0-3741-5912-2
- OCLC: 1182580330
- Website: www.oliverburkeman.com/books

Four Thousand Weeks: Time Management for Mortals is a 2021 non-fiction book written by English author Oliver Burkeman.

The title draws from the premise that "the average human lifespan is absurdly, terrifyingly, insultingly short... Assuming you live to be eighty, you’ll have had about four thousand weeks."Four Thousand Weeks is a philosophical exploration of the modern relationship with time, along with how humans can make the most of a finite existence.

The book was a New York Times bestseller.

== Summary ==
=== Part I: Choosing to Live ===
The book starts by exploring the concept of time. Burkeman juxtaposes existence in the modern world to life before the invention of clocks. For the medieval farmer, work was infinite and life revolved around "task orientation": "the rhythms of life emerge organically from the tasks themselves". According to Burkeman, clocks were invented as a way to coordinate the actions of multiple people; people then started treating time as a resource to be used, bought, and sold. In turn, this creates pressure to be more efficient: "The trouble with attempting to master your time... is that time ends up mastering you." Burkeman suggests "a limit-embracing attitude to time... organizing your days with the understanding that you definitely won’t have time for everything you want to do"

The book then turns to the pitfalls of modern life. It mentions "the efficiency trap"—"rendering yourself more efficient... won’t generally result in the feeling of having "enough time," because... the demands will increase to offset any benefits". Convenience culture is another pitfall: "freeing up time... backfires in terms of quantity, because the freed-up time just fills with more things you feel you have to do... accidentally... eliminating things we didn’t realize we valued until they were gone".

Burkeman explores Heidegger’s idea that every moment of human existence deals with the constraints of finitude; any decision made closes off the possibility of countless other choices. Burkeman encourages embracing "the joy of missing out"—"the thrilling recognition that... if you didn’t have to decide what to miss out on, your choices couldn’t truly mean everything".

According to Burkeman, a crucial problem of time management is knowing "what to do when far too many things feel at least somewhat important". He suggests that in addition to acknowledging the limits of not being able to accomplish everything, people should decide which tasks to focus on and which to neglect. Similarly, Burkeman argues that to live life to the fullest, people must choose to settle.

On the topics of boredom and distraction, Burkeman argues that distractions—"motivated by the desire to try to flee something painful about our experience of the present"—are a way of seeking relief from the discomfort of confronting limitation. Instead of going against such discomfort, Burkeman's advice is to acknowledge and accept such feelings, drawing parallels with Zen Buddhism.

=== Part II: Beyond Control ===
In the next section of the book, Burkeman tackles the issues of not having enough time, along with anxiety about the future. He begins with Hofstadter's law, the concept that tasks often take longer than people expect, even when factoring in Hofstadter's law itself. Burkeman asserts that although planning is essential for a meaningful life, the future is both unpredictable and uncontrollable; by not demanding certainty that things will go as planned, one can begin to let go of anxiety.

According to Burkeman, even leisure time may become a means to an end in which activities for fun become additional todo list items. He brings up philosopher Kieran Setiya’s concept of an "atelic activity", an activity for which "its value isn’t derived from its telos, or ultimate aim". In a world that revolves around busyness and hurrying, patience is a virtue—the book posits that sticking with something allows for meaningful accomplishments. Burkeman also discusses how people's lives have become increasingly uncoordinated, resulting in less meaningful social interaction. He recommends prioritizing activities in the physical world over the digital one, as well as choosing to spend more time with family, friends, and community.

Burkeman champions what he calls "cosmic insignificance therapy": "what you do with your life doesn’t matter all that much—and when it comes to how you’re using your finite time, the universe absolutely could not care less". Instead of holding oneself to unreasonable standards of a "well spent" life, by embracing "cosmic insignificance", "you get to spend your finite time focused on a few things that matter to you, in themselves, right now, in this moment".

=== Appendix ===
The appendix, "Ten Tools for Embracing Your Finitude", offers ten further suggestions for living according to this "limit-embracing philosophy". By accepting the truth about limited time, one can be more intentional about accomplishing the things that matter.

1. Adopt a "fixed volume" approach to productivity. Establish predetermined time boundaries for daily work.
2. Serialize: focus on one big project at a time.
3. Decide in advance what to fail at.
4. Focus on what you’ve already completed, not just on what’s left to complete. Keep a "done" list.
5. Consolidate your caring. Consciously choose which causes to support.
6. Embrace boring and single-purpose technology.
7. Seek out novelty in the mundane. Pay more attention to every moment.
8. Be a "researcher" in relationships; deliberately adopt an attitude of curiosity with others.
9. Cultivate instantaneous generosity. Whenever a generous impulse arises, act on the impulse immediately.
10. Practice doing nothing.

== Reception ==
Four Thousand Weeks has been featured in The New York Times, NPR, The Guardian, and The Atlantic. Following release, the book was on the New York Times Best Seller list for three weeks. Time listed the book in its "100 Must-Read Books of 2021": "Filled with levity and gentle wisdom, Burkeman’s book helps shift readers’ focus and values to encourage us to make the most of our time alive".
